= Sikkim National People's Party =

Indian political party

- Abbreviation: SNPP
- President: Biraj Adhikari > Delay Namgyal Barfungpa
- Founder: Biraj Adhikari
- Founded: 10 October 2008 (16 years ago)
- Dissolved: 22 March 2022 (3 years ago)
- Merged into: Sikkim Krantikari Morcha
- Headquarters: Gangtok, Sikkim, India.
- Ideology: Localism
- Colours: White and Red
- ECI Status: Registered-Unrecognized State Party (Sikkim) (2019–22)
- Alliance: Sikkim Progressive Alliance (2019)

The Sikkim National People's Party (SNPP) was a regional political party (State Party (Unrecognized)) in the Indian state of Sikkim. The election symbol of the party was a pen nib. SNPP didn't have any relationship with Sikkim National Party (SNP) in same state or National People's Party (NPP) in the state of Meghalaya.

== History ==
=== Pre-SNPP history ===
Biraj Adhikari and Delay Namgyal Barfungpa were members of the Sikkim Pradesh Congress Committee (SPCC, Sikkim branch of Indian National Congress (INC)) which was led by Nar Bahadur Bhandari. In 2004, as the candidates of INC, Adhikari contested the sole Lok Sabha seat from Sikkim, Barfungpa contested the Sikkim Legislative seat from Rumtek Constituency. Both were defeated by candidates of the ruling party Sikkim Democratic Front (SDF).

In May 2006, because of discontent with Bhandari's leadership, Biraji Adhikari seceded from SPCC. He joined Sikkim Himali Rajya Parishad (SHRP) as the spokesperson of it. Meanwhile, there is not much information on the movement of Delay Namgyal Barfungpa from 2004 to 2008, but he also seceded from SPCC at some point.

=== Establishment of SNPP ===
On 10 October 2008, Adhikari seceded from SHRP, and established the new party, Sikkim National People's Party (SNPP) for fighting with SDF. Adhikari was elected to the president, Tseten Dorjee Lepcha was elected as the working president, and Delay Namgyal Barfungpa was elected to the treasurer.

In the Sikkim Legislative Assembly election of 2009, Adhikari contested from 2 constituencies (Rhenock and Chujachen), Tseten Dorjee Lepcha contested from Djongu constituency and Barfungpa contested from Gangtok constituency. SNPP formed the electoral alliance, United Sikkimese Alliance (USA) with Sikkim Jan-Ekta Party (SJEP). With the exception of SJEP, SNPP didn't affiliate with SPCC or other opposition parties.

However, SNPP couldn't be registered in the List of Political Parties of Election Commission of India (ECI) before the election period, so they had to run as independent candidates. As a result, they received 6.26% votes (Tseten Dorjee Lepcha in Djongu) or less in each constituency.

=== Secession of Adhikari ===
Delay Namgyal Barfungpa was promoted to the vice president of SNPP at some point from 2009 to 2012. In the Sikkim Legislative Assembly election of 2014 SNPP didn't contest and appealed to voters to be politically conscious, pointing out the "None of the Above" (NOTA) option.

In January 2018 SNPP announced that it would contest the Sikkim Legislative Assembly Election 2019. However, in August 2018 Adhikari resigned from the president and seceded from SNPP. He transferred to Hamro Sikkim Party (HSP) which is led by Bhaichung Bhutia, and Adhikari was appointed to the spokesperson of the party. Barfungpa didn't follow Adhikari, and Barfungpa was elected to the SNPP president by party members.

=== Barfungpa’s leaderships ===
In March 2019 SNPP participated in the election alliance, Sikkim Progressive Alliance (SPA) which was formed by Sikkim Sangram Parishad (SSP), Sikkim Rajya Manch Party (SRMP) and Sikkim United Front Party (SUFP). SPA sent 8 candidates for 2019 Sikkim Legislative Assembly election, 1 candidate for 2019 Sikkim Lok Sabah election, and 3 of 9 were SNPP candidates.

But SNPP had not been registered in the List of Political Parties of ECI by the election date. Barfungpa and another 2 SNPP candidates had to run as independent candidates, again. Barfungpa received only 97 votes (1.31%, 4th position of 6 candidates) in Gangtok constituency.

Before the October same year By-Election of Sikkim Legislative Assembly (3 constituencies), the candidate of HSP from Gangtok constituency, Bhaichung Bhutia proposed a pre-poll alliance to Barfungpa, but Barfungpa didn't accept it. SNPP was planning to participate in this By-Election, and sent only Barfungpa to contest from Gangtok constituency as an independent candidate for a third time.

Just at that time, SNPP had finally been registered to the List of the Political Parties of ECI as the State Party (Unrecognized) on September 25, 2019. As the result, this was the first and final election that SNPP could contest by using its own party's name.

In this By-Election from Gangtok constituency, the candidate of Bharatiya Janata Party (BJP), Yong Tshering Lepcha was elected by 2,508 (40.88%) votes. At the same time, Barfungpa became a runner-up candidate by 1,498 (24.42%) votes, and he could refund his deposit of candidacy.

=== SNPP merged into SKM ===
In March 2022 Delay Namgyal Barfungpa joined the ruling Sikkim Krantikari Morcha (SKM) and merged SNPP with SKM. SNPP executive members and party supporters also officially merged with it.

== Ideology and political positions ==
SNPP advocated the safeguarding of interests of Sikkimese people and the special status for the state of Sikkim. It insisted that the protection of the Constitution of India's Article 371F and the reintroduction of the Sikkim Tax Manual. SNPP demanded that Government of Sikkim has to provide free electricity & medicines for the people of Sikkim.

SNPP also demanded that the Nepali seats in the Sikkim Legislative Assembly should be reinstated. At the same time, it opposed the merger of Darjeeling hills with Sikkim.

In December 2012 Delay Namgyal Barfungpa petitioned the Supreme Court with corruption allegations against the ruling political party (1994-2019) SDF Government. In May 2019 Barfungpa attended the swearing-in ceremony for the Chief Minister of Sikkim, Prem Singh Tamang (P.S. Golay) who is the president of Sikkim Krantikari Morcha (SKM). Conversely, the former Chief Minister and president of SDF, Pawan Kumar Chamling had boycotted it. In the by-election 2019 Barfungpa criticized that the BJP-SKM alliance is a kind of backdoor politics.

== Electoral records ==
Sikkim Legislative Assembly election

Year	Total Seats	Seats Contested	Seats Won	Forfeited Deposits	% Votes Contested	Source
2019 (by-election)	3	1	0	0	24.42	

== Presidents ==
- 1st Biraj Adhikari (10 October 2008 - 4 August 2018)
- 2nd Delay Namgyal Barfungpa (13 August 2018 - 22 March 2022)

== Organisation ==
- SNPP Youth
