= List of female members of the Sikkim Legislative Assembly =

This is a list of women who have been elected as members of the legislative assembly (MLAs) to the Sikkim Legislative Assembly.

== List ==
Party	Portrait	Name	Constituency	Year elected	Year left	Reason
SNC		Hemlata Chettri	Geyzing	1975	1979	Retired
SDF		Chandra Maya Subba	Maneybong–Dentam	2009	2014	Retired
SDF		Tulshi Devi Rai	Melli	2009	2019	Retired
SDF		Tilu Gurung	Namthang–Rateypani	2009	2019	Retired
SDF		Neeru Sewa	West Pendam	2009	2014	Retired
SDF		Chandra Maya Limboo	Yangthang	2014	2019	Retired
SKM		Sunita Gajmer	Salghari–Zoom	2019	2024	Retired
SDF		Farwanti Tamang	Melli	2019	2024	Retired
SDF		Raj Kumari Thapa	Rangang–Yangang	2019	2024	Switched from SDF to BJP
SKM		Raj Kumari Thapa	Rangang–Yangang	2024		Serving
SKM		Krishna Kumari Rai	Namchi–Singhithang	2024	2024	Resigned
SKM		Pamin Lepcha	Gnathang–Machong	2024		Serving
SKM		Kala Rai	Upper Burtuk	2024		Serving
