= Biraj Adhikari =

Indian politician (1961–2024)

- Adhikari in 2019

President of the SNPP
- In office 10 October 2008 – 6 August 2018
- Succeeded by: Delay Namgyal Barfungpa

Personal details
- Born: 12 June 1961
- Died: 7 March 2024 (aged 62) Gangtok, Sikkim, India
- Party: INC (SPCC, until 2006); SHRP (2006–2008); SNPP (2008–2018); HSP (from 2018)

Biraj Adhikari (12 June 1961 – 7 March 2024) was an Indian politician. Born in Sikkim, Adhikari first became the general secretary of the Sikkim Pradesh Congress Committee, a branch of the Indian National Congress. Adhikari then joined the Sikkim Himali Rajya Parishad, followed by forming and becoming president of the Sikkim National People's Party. He also took part in several elections in the state of Sikkim as part of these parties and the Hamro Sikkim Party, before retiring from active politics a few months prior to his death in March 2024.

== Political career ==
Adhikari was the general secretary of the Sikkim Pradesh Congress Committee (SPCC), the Sikkim branch of the Indian National Congress (INC) led by Nar Bahadur Bhandari. In 2004, as the candidate of the INC, Adhikari contested the sole Lok Sabha seat from Sikkim, but was defeated by a candidate from the ruling party Sikkim Democratic Front (SDF).

In May 2006, because of discontent with Bhandari's leadership, Adhikari left the SPCC. Thereafter, he joined and served as the spokesperson of the Sikkim Himali Rajya Parishad (SHRP). Adhikari was then removed from the SHRP in October 2008, and on 10 October, he established and was elected president of the Sikkim National People's Party (SNPP).

Adhikari took part in the Sikkim Legislative Assembly election of 2009, contesting from two constituencies, Rhenock and Chujachen. However, SNPP could not be registered in the List of Political Parties of Election Commission of India (ECI) before the election period, as a result, Adhikari and other SNPP candidates ran as independent candidates. They received 6.26% votes or less in each constituency.

In 2014 Sikkim Legislative Assembly election, Adhikari and the SNPP did not contest the election, though in January 2018, Adhikari announced that SNPP would contest the Sikkim Legislative Assembly Election 2019. However, in August that year, Adhikari transferred and was appointed as spokesperson of the Hamro Sikkim Party (HSP) which was led by Bhaichung Bhutia. Delay Namgyal Barfungpa did not follow Adhikari, and Barfungpa was elected to the new SNPP president by party members.

In both 2019 Sikkim Lok Sabha Election and 2019 Sikkim Legislative Assembly election (Rhenock constituency), Adhikari stood as the candidate of HSP, losing in both elections.

On 30 August 2023, Adhikari resigned from HSP due to health issues, including cancer.

== Death ==
Biraj Adhikari died at a hospital in Manipal, Tadong, Gangtok on 7 March 2024, at the age of 62. He had been hospitalised since February 2024 and had retired from active politics due to health issues.

== Electoral record ==
Sikkim Legislative Assembly election

Year	Constituency	Political Party	Result	Position	Votes	% Votes	% Margin	Deposit	Source
2009	Rhenock	Independent	Lost	3rd/5	225	2.16	−51.56	forfeited	
2009	Chujachen	Independent	Lost	8th/8	71	0.66	−73.69	forfeited	
2019	Rhenock	HSP	Lost	6th/7	85	0.60	−55.84	forfeited	

Lok Sabah election, Sikkim

Year	Constituency	Political Party	Result	Position	Votes	% Votes	% Margin	Deposit	Source
2004	Sikkim	INC	Lost	2nd/4	60,258	27.43	−42.41	refunded	
2019	Sikkim	HSP	Lost	6th/10	1,998	0.57	−46.89	forfeited	
