= Delay Namgyal Barfungpa =

Indian politician

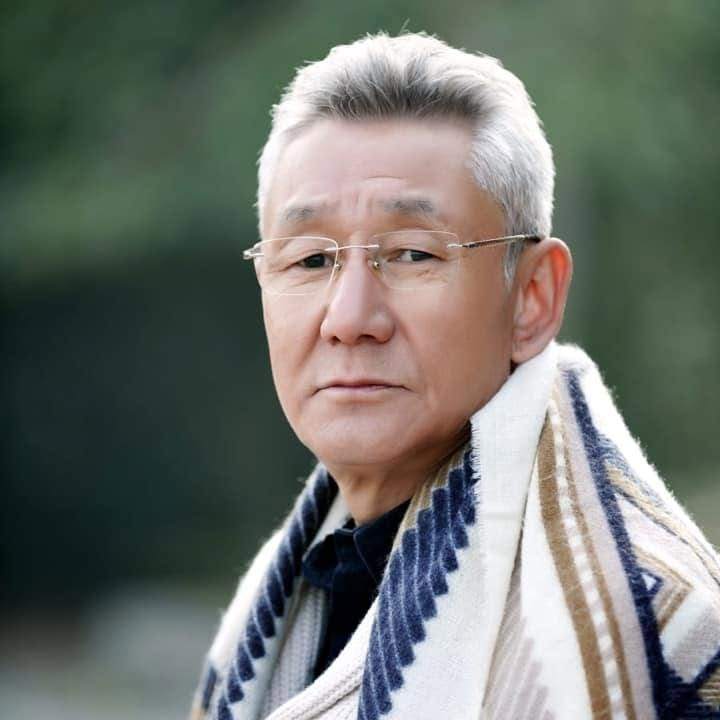

Member of Sikkim Legislative Assembly
- Incumbent
- Assumed office 12 June 2024
- Preceded by: Yong Tshering Lepcha
- Constituency: Gangtok

President of SNPP
- In office 13 August 2018 – 22 March 2022
- Preceded by: Biraj Adhikari
- Succeeded by: merged into SKM

Personal details
- Born: Delay Namgyal Barfungpa; 3 May 1965 (age 61)
- Party: SKM (2022–present); SPCC; INC; SNPP
- Children: Kilp Barfungpa; Naomi Barfungpa
- Profession: Politician /Social Worker/Businessman

Delay Namgyal Barfungpa (Delay Kazi Barfungpa) is an Indian politician.

He contested from 27 Gangtok constituency and won 2024 general elections. He is Member of Legislative Assembly from Sikkim. He joined politics from his youthful days and always served the people of Sikkim. He is advisor of Urban Development Department & Food and Civil services Department

== Political career ==
Delay Namgyal Barfungpa was former member of the Sikkim Pradesh Congress Committee (SPCC, Sikkim branch of Indian National Congress) which was led by Nar Bahadur Bhandari. Barfungpa contested the Sikkim Legislative seat from Rumtek Constituency, but he was defeated by the candidate of the ruling party Sikkim Democratic Front (SDF). After this election, he seceded from SPCC at some point from 2004 to 2008.

On 10 October 2008, Delay Namgyal Barfungpa joined Sikkim National People’s Party (SNPP), which was established by Biraj Adhikari (former general secretary of SPCC and spokesperson of Sikkim Himali Rajya Parishad (SHRP)) for fighting with SDF. Barfungpa was appointed to the treasurer of SNPP. In 2009 Sikkim Legislative Assembly election, Barfungpa changed his constituency from Rumtek to Gangtok. But SNPP had not been able to be registered in the List of Political Parties of Election Commission of India (ECI). Barfungpa had to run as an independent candidate, and lost by less than 3% votes.

Delay Namgyal Barfungpa was promoted to the vice president of SNPP at some point from 2009 to 2012. In December 2012 Barfungpa petitioned the Supreme Court with corruption allegations against the SDF Government. In August 2018 Adhikari resigned from the president and seceded from SNPP. Barfungpa didn't follow Adhikari, and Barfungpa was elected to the SNPP president by party members.

In 2019 Sikkim Legislative Assembly election, SNPP had not been able to be registered in the List of Political Parties of ECI before election period, Delay Namgyal Barfungpa and another 2 SNPP candidates had to run as independent candidates, again. Barfungpa lost and received only 1.31% in Gangtok constituency.

In the By-Election of Sikkim Legislative Assembly 2019 (3 constituencies), Delay Namgyal Barfungpa was planning to contest from Gangtok constituency as an independent candidate for a third time. Before this By-Election, the candidate of Hamro Sikkim Party (HSP) from Gangtok constituency, Bhaichung Bhutia proposed a pre-poll alliance to Barfungpa, but Barfungpa didn't accept it.

Just as that time, SNPP had finally been registered to the List of the Political Parties of ECI as the State Party (Unrecognized) on 25 September 2019. As the result, this was the first and final election that Delay Namgyal Barfungpa could contest as the candidate of SNPP.

In this By-Election from Gangtok constituency, the candidate of Bharatiya Janata Party (BJP), Yong Tshering Lepcha was elected by 2,508 (40.88%) votes. At the same time, Delay Namgyal Barfungpa became a runner-up candidate by 1,498 (24.42%) votes, and he could refund his deposit of candidacy.

Delay Namgyal Barfungpa is a candidate with the 2nd highest declared assets (Rs 57,79,62,986), contested in Sikkim Legislative Assembly Election 2019.

In March 2022, Delay Namgyal Barfungpa announced the SNPP's merger with Sikkim Krantikari Morcha (SKM). Barfungpa along with SNPP executive members and party supporters also joined SKM.

== Electoral record ==
Sikkim Legislative Assembly election

Year	Constituency	Political Party	Result	Position	Votes	% Votes	% Margin	Deposit	Source
2004	Rumtek	INC	Lost	2nd/2	4,323	43.39	-13.21	refunded	
2009	Gangtok	Independent	Lost	3rd/5	148	2.62	-58.56	forfeited	
2019	Gangtok	Independent	Lost	4th/6	97	1.31	-51.37	forfeited	
2019 (by-election)	Gangtok	SNPP	Lost	2nd/6	1,498	24.42	-16.46	refunded	
2024	Gangtok	SKM	Won						
