= Athup Lepcha =

Indian politician and environmental activist

Member of the Sikkim Legislative Assembly
- In office 1979–1985
- Constituency: Djongu

Minister of Forest and Environment, Government of Sikkim
- In office 1979–1984
- Constituency: Djongu

Personal details
- Born: Athup Lepcha; 1944 or 1945
- Party: HSP (SJP > SPCC (INC) >)
- Profession: Farmer, the President of Affected Citizens of Teesta (ACT)

Athup Lepcha is an Indian politician and environmental activist. He is the vice president of Hamro Sikkim Party (HSP) and the president of "Affected Citizens of Teesta" (ACT), Non-governmental organization for environment and biodiversity.

== Political career ==
In 1979 Sikkim Legislative Assembly election, Athup Lepcha stood as a candidate of Sikkim Janata Parishad (SJP) from Djongu Constituency. He won and beat the candidate of Janata Party, incumbent chief minister of Sikkim, Kazi Lhendup Dorjee. Athup Lepcha appointed to the State Minister for Forest and Environment in Nar Bahadur Bhandari ministry.

In 1984, Athup Lepcha became one of the leaders of anti-Bhandari, and denounced the corruption of Bhandari. Bhandari ousted Athup Lepcha from his political party. In 1985 Sikkim Legislative Assembly election, Athup Lepcha stood as a candidate of Indian National Congress (INC). However, he was beaten by Sonam Choda Lepcha who was the candidate of Sikkim Sangram Parishad (SSP) which was led by Bhandari.

In 1989 Sikkim Legislative Assembly election, Athup Lepcha stood as a candidate of INC and fought with Sonam Choda Lepcha again, but Athup lost and the margin with Sonam Choda was increased. In 1994 Sikkim Legislative Assembly election, Athup Lepcha couldn’t get any political parties’ ticket, and stood as an independent candidate. He received only 9 votes.

Athup Lepcha turned to the environmental protection movement, and he became the president of "Affected Citizens of Teesta" (ACT), Non-governmental organization for environment and biodiversity.

In May 2018, Athup Lepcha came back to political circle of Sikkim after 24 years, and joined Hamro Sikkim Party (HSP) which was led by Bhaichung Bhutia. Athup Lepcha was appointed one of the 9 vice presidents of HSP. In 2019 Sikkim Legislative Assembly election, he stood as a candidate of HSP from Djongu 5th times, he secured 88 votes (1.04%) with 4th position.

== Electoral records ==
Sikkim Legislative Assembly election

Year	Constituency	Political Party	Result	Position	Votes	% Votes	% Margin	Deposit	Source
1979	Djongu	SJP	Won	1st/4	865	45.79	+19.16	refunded	
1985	Djongu	INC	Lost	2nd/5	765	32.72	-30.11	refunded	
1989	Djongu	INC	Lost	2nd/3	810	25.47	-47.55	refunded	
1994	Djongu	IND	Lost	4th/4	9	0.23	-40.09	forfeited	
2019	Djongu	HSP	Lost	4th/4	88	1.04	-65.13	forfeited	
