= Kunga Nima Lepcha =

Indian politician

Member of Sikkim Legislative Assembly
- In office 2014–2024
- Preceded by: Karmatempo Namgyal Gyaltsen
- Succeeded by: Tenzing Norbu Lamtha
- Constituency: Shyari

Minister of Human Resource Development, Law, Legislative & Parliamentary affairs and Land, Revenue and Disaster Management
- In office 2019–2024
- Constituency: Shyari

President of SPCC
- In office 20 April 2013 – 9 March 2014
- Preceded by: Nar Bahadur Bhandari
- Succeeded by: Akar Dhoj Limbu (A. D. Subba)

Personal details
- Born: Kunga Nima Lepcha; 1947/48
- Party: Sikkim Krantikari Morcha (2014–Present)
- Other political affiliations: SPCC (2004–2014); Sikkim Democratic Front
- Education: Kalimpong College
- Profession: Government Employee, Social Worker

Kunga Nima Lepcha is an Indian politician in Sikkim. He is the acting president of Sikkim Krantikari Morcha (SKM), incumbent member of Sikkim Legislative Assembly and the state Minister of Prem Singh Tamang ministry.

== Political career ==
At first, Kunga Nima Lepcha was the member of the ruling party, Sikkim Democratic Front (SDF). In January 2004, he seceded from SDF and joined Sikkim Pradesh Congress Committee (SPCC: Sikkim branch of Indian National Congress (INC)). He became the spokesperson of SPCC at the later date. In 2004 and 2009 Sikkim Legislative Assembly election, he stood as the candidate of INC from Shyari constituency, but he lost and became a runner-up candidate in both elections.

In 20 April 2013, Kunga Nima Lepcha was elected to the president of SPCC after his predecessor, Nar Bahadur Bhandari's secession. However, in March 2014, Kunga Nima Lepcha seceded from SPCC and joined Sikkim Krantikari Morcha (SKM) which was led by Prem Singh Tamang (P. S. Golay). In 2014 Sikkim Legislative Assembly election, he stood as the SKM candidate from Shyari and won the seat.

In December 2015, 7 SKM Members of Sikkim Legislative Assembly defected to the ruling party SDF, but 2 other MLAs of SKM, Kunga Nima Lepcha and Sonam Lama stayed with their party.

In 2019 Sikkim Legislative Assembly election, he was nominated to 2 constituencies (Shyari and Gangtok). He won in both constituencies and SKM obtained the political power in Sikkim. He was appointed to the Minister of Human Resource Development, Law, Legislative & Parliamentary affairs and Land, Revenue and Disaster management in P. S. Golay Cabinet.

== Electoral records ==
Sikkim Legislative Assembly election

Year	Constituency	Political Party	Result	Position	Votes	% Votes	% Margin	Deposit	Source
2004	Shyari	INC	Lost	2nd/3	2,415	33.71	-31.07	refunded	
2009	Shyari	INC	Lost	2nd/4	2,753	34.54	-28.62	refunded	
2014	Shyari	SKM	Won	1st/3	5,324	52.23	+7.32	refunded	
2019	Shyari	SKM	Won	1st/3	6,638	54.31	+11.09	refunded	
2019	Gangtok	SKM	Won	1st/6	3,838	51.68	+11.96	refunded	
2024	Shyari	SKM	Lost						
