= Sikkim Rajya Manch =

Indian political party

Sikkim Rajya Manch Party
- Abbreviation: SRMP
- Leader: Rup Narayan Chamling
- Founder: Rup Narayan Chamling
- Founded: 7 December 2017 (8 years ago)
- Headquarters: Yangang, Sikkim, India.
- Ideology: Localism
- Colours: Light Blue , Green , White
- ECI status: Registered-Unrecognized State Party (Sikkim)
- Alliance: Sikkim Progressive Alliance (2019-present)
- Seats in Sikkim Legislative Assembly: 0 / 32

Sikkim Rajya Manch Party (SRMP) (English Translation: Sikkim State Forum Party) is a regional political party in the Indian state of Sikkim. The founder and incumbent President is Rup Narayan Chamling (R. N. Chamling) who is a younger brother of former Chief Minister of Sikkim and the president of Sikkim Democratic Front (SDF), Pawan Kumar Chamling.

== History ==
In spite of the objection of Pawan Kumar Chamling, R.N. Chamling stood as an independent candidate in the bye-election of Sikkim Legislative Assembly on 16 September 2014. R. N. Chamling won and beat the candidate of SDF, Kumari Manger in Yangang. Pawan Kumar Chamling did not forgive R. N. Chamling's behavior, and did not accept him as a Member of SDF. As the result, R. N. Chamling kept his position as an independent Member of Legislative Assembly.

On 7 December 2017, R. N. Chamling established a new party, Sikkim Rajya Manch Party (SRMP) in Sribadam in West Sikkim. He was elected President of SRMP, and declared to fight with SDF.

In March 2019, SRMP participated in the electoral alliance, Sikkim Progressive Alliance (SPA) which was formed by Sikkim Sangram Parishad (SSP), Sikkim National People’s Party (SNPP) and Sikkim United Front Party (SUFP). SPA sent 8 candidates for 2019 Sikkim Legislative Assembly election, 1 candidate for 2019 Sikkim Lok Sabah election, and 3 of 9 are SRMP candidates. But in this election, all SRMP candidates lost and secured only 3.85% (R. N. Chamling from Rangang-Yangang) or less votes in each constituency.

SRMP didn't participate in the Bye-Election of Sikkim Legislative Assembly on 21 October 2019.

== Electoral records ==
Sikkim Legislative Assembly election

Year	Total Seats	Seats Contested	Seats Won	Forfeited Deposits	% Votes Contested	Source
2019	32	3	0	3	1.77	
