= Bina Basnett =

Indian politician

- Constituency: Upper Tadong

President of HSP
- In office 24 January 2019 – 20 September 2022
- Succeeded by: Bhaichung Bhutia

Personal details
- Born: Bina Basnett; 1984 or 1985
- Party: HSP
- Profession: Doctor

Bina Basnett is an Indian politician in Sikkim and the president of Hamro Sikkim Party (HSP).

== Political career ==
Bina Basnett completed her schooling in 2003 from Gangtok Deorali Girls SSS, she pursued her MBBS from SMIMS Tadong (CRH). After completing MBBS in 2009, she continued her Doctor of Medicine at SMIMS Gangtok in 2013 and later practiced and worked as a lecturer in Lady Hardinge Medical College New Delhi.

On 31 May 2018, Bina Basnett joined Hamro Sikkim Party (HSP) which was led by Bhaichung Bhutia. On the launching ceremony of HSP, she was elected to one of the 9 vice presidents of HSP.

For about 8 months after the launching ceremony, the president of HSP was kept vacant. On January 24, 2019, vice president Bina Basnett was nominated to the 1st president of HSP. In 2019 Sikkim Legislative Assembly election, she stood as the candidate of HSP from Upper Tadong, but she lost and received only 1.63% votes.

In 20 September 2022 Bhaichung Bhutia was elected unanimously by party leaders and members as the new president of HSP. Bina Basnett completed her term.

== Electoral record ==
Sikkim Legislative Assembly election

| Year | Constituency | Political Party | Result | Position | Votes | % Votes | % Margin | Deposit | Source |
|---|---|---|---|---|---|---|---|---|---|
| 2019 | Upper Tadong | HSP | Lost | 3rd/5 | 123 | 1.63 | -49.38 | forfeited | |
