= Gangtok Assembly constituency =

Constituency of the Sikkim legislative assembly in India

Coordinates: 27.339°N 88.610°E

Gangtok
- Constituency No. 27 for the Sikkim Legislative Assembly

Constituency details
- Country: India
- Region: Northeast India
- State: Sikkim
- District: Gangtok
- Lok Sabha constituency: Sikkim
- Established: 1979
- Reservation: BL

Member of Legislative Assembly
- 11th Sikkim Legislative Assembly
- Incumbent Delay Namgyal Barfungpa
- Party: SKM
- Alliance: NDA
- Elected year: 2024

Gangtok Assembly constituency is one of the 32 assembly constituencies of Sikkim a north east state of India. Gangtok is part of Sikkim Lok Sabha constituency. This constituency has been reserved for Scheduled Tribes (ST: Bhutia, Lepcha and Sherpa) since 2009.

== Members of the Legislative Assembly ==
Election	Member	Party
1979	Lal Bahadur Basnet	Sikkim Janata Parishad
1985	Balchand Sarda	Independent politician
1989	Manita Pradhan	Sikkim Sangram Parishad
1994	Narendra Kumar Pradhan	Sikkim Sangram Parishad
1999	Narendra Kumar Pradhan	Sikkim Sangram Parishad
2004	Narendra Kumar Pradhan	Sikkim Democratic Front
2009	Dorjee Namgyal Bhutia	Sikkim Democratic Front
2014	Pintso Chopel	Sikkim Krantikari Morcha
2019	Kunga Nima Lepcha	Sikkim Krantikari Morcha
2019 by-election	Yong Tshering Lepcha	Bharatiya Janata Party
2024	Delay Namgyal Barfungpa	Sikkim Krantikari Morcha

== Electoral results ==
=== Assembly Election 2024 ===
2024 Sikkim Legislative Assembly election: Gangtok
Party	Candidate	Votes	%	±%
SKM	Delay Namgyal Barfungpa	4,440	57.44%	New
SDF	Pintso Chopel Lepcha	1,748	22.61%	▲8.13
BJP	Pema Wangyal Rinzing	1,230	15.91%	▼25.66
CAP–Sikkim	Dawcho Lepcha	206	2.66%	New
NOTA	None of the Above	62	0.80%	▼0.89
INC	Snumit Targain	44	0.57%	New
Margin of victory		2,692	34.83%	▲18.08
Turnout		7,730	65.06%	▲13.83
Registered electors		11,881		▲0.88
SKM gain from BJP		Swing	▲15.87	

=== Assembly by-election 2019 ===
In the 2019 Sikkim Legislative Assembly election, Kunga Nima Lepcha of SKM won in both Shyari and Gangtok constituencies, so he relinquished Gangtok seat.

In the by-election, ruling SKM didn't send their candidate to Gangtok, and supported opposition BJP. Former ruling SDF participated in the Sikkim Legislative Assembly election as the opposition for the first time in 25 years. Opposition SNPP and SRP sent their candidates to Gangtok for the first time. Opposition INC boycotted this by-election.

As the result, Yong Tshering Lepcha of BJP defeated his nearest rival Delay Namgyal Barfungpa of SNPP. Rinzing Ongmu Bhutia of SDF fell to the 3rd position.

2019 Sikkim Legislative Assembly by-election: Gangtok
Party	Candidate	Votes	%	±%
BJP	Yong Tshering Lepcha	2,508	41.57%	▲36.29
SNPP	Delay Namgyal Barfungpa	1,498	24.83%	New
SDF	Rinzing Ongmu Bhutia	874	14.49%	▼25.23
HSP	Bhaichung Bhutia	579	9.60%	▲8.65
Independent	Karma Yenten Chankapa	455	7.54%	New
SRP	Song Tshering Lepcha	119	1.97%	New
NOTA	None of the Above	102	1.69%	▲1.18
Margin of victory		1,010	16.74%	▲4.78
Turnout		6,033	51.23%	▼12.53
Registered electors		11,777		▲1.10
BJP gain from SKM		Swing	▼10.10	

=== Assembly election 2019 ===
2019 Sikkim Legislative Assembly election: Gangtok
Party	Candidate	Votes	%	±%
SKM	Kunga Nima Lepcha	3,838	51.68%	▼9.60
SDF	Pintso Chopel	2,950	39.72%	▲5.98
BJP	Yong Tshering Lepcha	392	5.28%	▲2.79
Independent	Delay Namgyal Barfungpa	97	1.31%	New
HSP	Bhaichung Bhutia	70	0.94%	New
Independent	Phurba Sherpa	42	0.57%	New
NOTA	None of the Above	38	0.51%	New
Margin of victory		888	11.96%	▼15.58
Turnout		7,427	63.76%	▼4.42
Registered electors		11,649		▲15.65
SKM hold		Swing	▼9.60	

=== Assembly election 2014 ===
2014 Sikkim Legislative Assembly election: Gangtok
Party	Candidate	Votes	%	±%
SKM	Pintso Chopel	4,208	61.28%	New
SDF	Hishey Lachungpa	2,317	33.74%	▼27.43
BJP	Norden Gyalpo Dorji	171	2.49%	New
INC	Tshering Gyatso Kaleon	72	1.05%	▼32.59
NOTA	None of the Above	62	0.90%	New
AITC	Tshering Wangchuk Lepcha	37	0.54%	New
Margin of victory		1,891	27.54%	▲0.00
Turnout		6,867	68.17%	▼2.21
Registered electors		10,073		
SKM gain from SDF		Swing	▲0.10	

=== Assembly election 2009 ===
2009 Sikkim Legislative Assembly election: Gangtok
Party	Candidate	Votes	%	±%
SDF	Dorjee Namgyal Bhutia	3,506	61.18%	▼5.51
INC	Tshering Gyatso Kaleon	1,928	33.64%	▲1.94
Independent	Delay Namgyal Barfungpa	150	2.62%	New
SHRP	Uttam Lepcha	123	2.15%	▲1.54
Margin of victory		1,578	27.53%	▼7.46
Turnout		5,731	70.38%	▲7.88
Registered electors		8,143		
SDF hold		Swing	▼5.51	

=== Assembly election 2004 ===
2004 Sikkim Legislative Assembly election: Gangtok
Party	Candidate	Votes	%	±%
SDF	Narendra Kumar Pradhan	5,952	66.69%	▲23.17
INC	Nar Bahadur Bhandari	2,829	31.70%	▲25.48
SSP	Devi Pd. Dahal	90	1.01%	▼47.88
SHRP	Bhim Chettri	54	0.61%	New
Margin of victory		3,123	34.99%	▲29.62
Turnout		8,925	62.50%	▼3.74
Registered electors		14,280		▲7.34
SDF gain from SSP		Swing	▲17.80	

=== Assembly election 1999 ===
1999 Sikkim Legislative Assembly election: Gangtok
Party	Candidate	Votes	%	±%
SSP	Narendra Kumar Pradhan	4,308	48.89%	▲9.33
SDF	K. B. Gurung	3,835	43.52%	▲25.81
INC	Anand Lama	548	6.22%	▼23.04
CPI(M)	Bhumerlall Sirohia	86	0.98%	New
Margin of victory		473	5.37%	▼4.92
Turnout		8,812	67.82%	▼4.78
Registered electors		13,303		▲33.56
SSP hold		Swing	▲9.33	

=== Assembly election 1994 ===
1994 Sikkim Legislative Assembly election: Gangtok
Party	Candidate	Votes	%	±%
SSP	Narendra Kumar Pradhan	2,798	39.55%	▼16.85
INC	Dilli Pd. Dhungel	2,070	29.26%	▼11.93
SDF	Sher Bahadur Subedi	1,253	17.71%	New
Independent	Balchand	617	8.72%	New
Independent	Penzo D. Namgyal	60	0.85%	New
Independent	Krishna S. Basneti	55	0.78%	New
Independent	Gokul Singh Cintury	52	0.74%	New
BJP	Kiran Chhetri	46	0.65%	New
Independent	Pren Prakash Goyal	42	0.59%	New
Margin of victory		728	10.29%	▼4.92
Turnout		7,074	72.54%	▲4.55
Registered electors		9,960		▲9.34
SSP hold		Swing	▼16.85	

=== Assembly election 1989 ===
1989 Sikkim Legislative Assembly election: Gangtok
Party	Candidate	Votes	%	±%
SSP	Manita Pradhan	3,415	56.40%	▲18.84
INC	Dilli Prasad Dhungel	2,494	41.19%	▲31.12
RIS	Lal Bahadur Basnet	129	2.13%	New
Margin of victory		921	15.21%	▲9.60
Turnout		6,055	68.31%	▲16.52
Registered electors		9,109		▼2.27
SSP gain from Independent		Swing		

=== Assembly election 1985 ===
1985 Sikkim Legislative Assembly election: Gangtok
Party	Candidate	Votes	%	±%
Independent	Balchand Sarda	2,010	43.17%	New
SSP	Dil Kumari Bhandari	1,749	37.56%	New
INC	M.K.Chetri	469	10.07%	New
Independent	Sonam Gyatso Trateng	208	4.47%	New
Independent	Passang Obed Pazo	72	1.55%	New
Independent	James Basnet	39	0.84%	New
Independent	Kiran Chetri	38	0.82%	New
SPC	Kalawati Subba	27	0.58%	▼5.89
JP	Chyangha Tamang	25	0.54%	▼26.21
Margin of victory		261	5.61%	▼6.54
Turnout		4,656	50.71%	▼5.55
Registered electors		9,321		▲17.87
Independent gain from SJP		Swing	▲4.28	

=== Assembly election 1979 ===
1979 Sikkim Legislative Assembly election: Gangtok
Party	Candidate	Votes	%	±%
SJP	Lal Bahadur Basnet	1,707	38.89%	New
JP	Dorjee Dadul	1,174	26.75%	New
Independent	D. P. Bhawanipuri	420	9.57%	New
Independent	Kharka Bahadur Chhetri	321	7.31%	New
SPC	Kaiser Bahadur Thapa	284	6.47%	New
Independent	Ganesan	107	2.44%	New
SC (R)	Jagat Bandhu Pradhan	89	2.03%	New
Independent	Ram Chandra Verma	77	1.75%	New
Independent	Bimal Kumar Rasaily	59	1.34%	New
Independent	K. B. Pradhan	46	1.05%	New
Independent	Gauri Shanker Bansal	24	0.55%	New
Margin of victory		533	12.14%	
Turnout		4,389	56.74%	
Registered electors		7,908		
SJP win (new seat)				

== See also ==
- Gangtok
- Gangtok district
- List of constituencies of Sikkim Legislative Assembly
