= Government of Sikkim =

Indian state government

- Emblem of Sikkim
- Seat of Government: Gangtok
- Website: sikkim.gov.in

Legislative branch
- Assembly: Sikkim Legislative Assembly
- Speaker: Mingma Narbu Sherpa
- Deputy Speaker: Raj Kumari Thapa
- Members in Assembly: 32

Executive branch
- Governor: Om Prakash Mathur
- Chief Minister: Prem Singh Tamang
- Deputy Chief Minister: Vacant
- Chief Secretary: Ravindra Telang

Judiciary
- High Court: Sikkim High Court
- Chief Justice: Biswanath Somadder

The Government of Sikkim also known as Sikkim Government or State Government of Sikkim, is the administrative executive authority of the Indian state of Sikkim and its 6 districts, created by the National Constitution as the legislative, executive and judicial authority to govern the state. The Governor acts as the head of state and is, nominally, the highest figure of executive authority. However it is the Chief Minister who is the de facto head of government and chief executive.

Gangtok is the capital of Sikkim, and houses the Vidhan Sabha (Legislative Assembly), the secretariat, and the Sikkim High Court.

The current Legislative Assembly of Sikkim is unicameral, consisting of 32 Member of the Legislative Assembly (M.L.A). Its term is 5 years, unless sooner dissolved.

== Council of Ministers ==
Source
S.No	Name	Constituency	Department	Party
1.	Prem Singh Tamang; Chief Minister	Rhenock	Home Department; Finance Department; Planning and Development Department; Department of Personnel; Power Department; Excise Department; Land Revenue and Disaster Management Department; Transport Department; Information and Public Relations Department; Information Technology Department; Skill Development Department; Other departments not allotted to other Ministers.	SKM
Cabinet Ministers
2.	Sonam Lama	Sangha	Public Health Engineering Department; Water Resources Department; Ecclesiastical Department	SKM
3.	Arun Kumar Upreti	Arithang	Rural Development Department; Cooperation Department	SKM
4.	Samdup Lepcha	Lachen-Mangan	Social Welfare Department; Women and Child Development Department; Printing and Stationery Department	SKM
5.	Bhim Hang Limboo	Yangthang	Buildings & Housing Department; Labour Department	SKM
6.	Bhoj Raj Rai	Poklok-Kamrang	Urban Development Department; Food & Civil Supplies Department	SKM
7.	G.T. Dhungel	Upper Tadong	Health & Family Welfare Department; Culture Department	SKM
8.	Puran Kumar Gurung	Chujachen	Agriculture Department; Horticulture Department; Animal Husbandry & Veterinary Services Department; Fisheries Development Department	SKM
9.	Pintso Namgyal Lepcha	Djongu	Forest & Environment Department; Mines and Geology Department; Science & Technology Department	SKM
10.	Nar Bahadur Dahal	Khamdong-Singtam	Roads & Bridges Department	SKM
11.	Raju Basnet	Namchaybong	Education Department; Sports & Youth Affairs Department; Law Department; Parliamentary Affairs Department	SKM
12.	Tshering Thendup Bhutia	Yoksam–Tashiding	Tourism and Civil Aviation Department; Commerce & Industries Department	SKM
