= Chief Minister of Sikkim =

Leader of the executive branch of Government of Sikkim

- सिक्किम के मुख्यमंत्री
- Emblem of Sikkim

- Flag of India

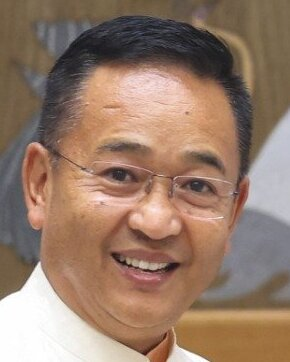
- Incumbent; Prem Singh Tamang since 27 May 2019
- Chief Minister; Government of Sikkim
- Style: The Honourable (formal); Mr. Chief Minister (informal)
- Type: Head of government
- Status: Leader of the Executive
- Abbreviation: CMoSikkim
- Member of: Legislative Assembly; State Cabinet
- Reports to: Governor of Sikkim; Sikkim Legislative Assembly
- Residence: Gangtok
- Seat: State Secretariat, Gangtok
- Nominator: MLAs of the majority party or alliance
- Appointer: Governor of Sikkim; by convention based on appointees ability to command confidence in the Legislative Assembly
- Term length: At the confidence of the assembly; Chief minister's term is for five years and is subject to no term limits.
- Formation: 16 May 1974 (52 years ago)
- First holder: Kazi Lhendup Dorjee
- Deputy: Deputy Chief Minister of Sikkim
- Salary: ₹187,000/month

The chief minister of Sikkim is the head of the executive branch of the Government of Sikkim, the subnational authority of the Indian state of Sikkim. As per the Constitution of India, the governor is the state's de jure head, but de facto executive authority rests with the chief minister. The chief minister has formal presidency over the Council of Ministers and governs with the confidence of a majority in the elected Sikkim Legislative Assembly.

Following elections to the Sikkim Legislative Assembly, the governor usually invites the party (or coalition) with a majority of seats to form the government. As such, the chief minister typically sits as a Member of the Legislative Assembly (MLA) and leads the largest party or a coalition of parties. The governor appoints the chief minister, whose council of ministers are collectively responsible to the assembly. Given that he has the confidence of the assembly, the chief minister's term is for five years and is subject to no term limits. The chief minister also serves as Leader of the House in the Legislative Assembly.

Since 1974, Sikkim has had five chief ministers. The first was Kazi Lhendup Dorjee of the Indian National Congress. Pawan Kumar Chamling of the Sikkim Democratic Front was the longest serving chief minister of Sikkim from 1994 to 2019. He occupied the office longer than all his predecessors put together and currently holds the record for longest serving CM in India. The 24 year old rule of Pawan Kumar Chamling ended in the 2019 Vidhan Sabha elections where Sikkim Krantikari Morcha emerged victorious. Prem Singh Tamang became chief minister on 27 May 2019.

== Oath as the state chief minister ==
The chief minister serves five years in the office. The following is the oath of the chief minister of state:

I, <Name of Chief Minister>, do swear in the name of God/solemnly affirm that I will bear true faith and allegiance to the Constitution of India as by law established, that I will uphold the sovereignty and integrity of India, that I will faithfully and conscientiously discharge my duties as a Minister for the State of () and that I will do right to all manner of people in accordance with the Constitution and the law without fear or favour, affection or ill-will.

Oath of Secrecy

"I, [Name], do swear in the name of God / solemnly affirm that I will not directly or indirectly communicate or reveal to any person or persons any matter which shall be brought under my consideration or shall become known to me as a Minister for the State of [Name of State] except as may be required for the due discharge of my duties as such Minister.A. Oath of Office (Karyalay ko Sapath) "Ma, [CM ko Naam], Ishwarka naam ma sapath khanchhu (or: dharma purwak pratigya garchhu) ki ma biddhi dwara sthapit Bharatko Sambidhan prati sacho shraddha ra nishtha rakhnechhu, ki ma Bharatko prabhusatta ra akhandatalaai akshunna rakhnechhu, ki ma [State ko Naam] rajyako mantri ko rupma aafno kartabyaharuko nishthapurwak ra bibechanasankalp dhangale nirbahan garnechhu ra ma bhaya ba pakshapat, anurag ba dwesh bina, sabai prakarka manisaharuko nimti Sambidhan ra kaanoon anusar nayaay garnechhu." B. Oath of Secrecy (Gopanityata ko Sapath) "Ma, [CM ko Naam], Ishwarka naam ma sapath khanchhu (or: dharma purwak pratigya garchhu) ki jo bishay [State ko Naam] rajyako mantri ko rupma mero bichardhin lyaeenechha ba malaai gyaat hunechha, tyaslaai ma kunai pani byakti ba byaktiharulaai, tyo mantri ko rupma aafno kartabyaharuko uchit nirbahan ko lagi aabsyak bhaeebahorba bahek, apratyakshya ba pratyakshya rupma sanchar ba prakat garnechhainu."

== Chief Ministers Of Sikkim (1975-present) ==
No	Portrait	Name	Constituency	Term of office			Elections	Party
No	Portrait	Name	Constituency	Took office	Left office	Time in office	Elections	Party
1		Kazi Lhendup Dorjee	Tashiding	16 May 1975	17 August 1979	4 years, 93 days	1974 (Sikkim National Elections)	Sikkim National Congress
1		Kazi Lhendup Dorjee	Tashiding	16 May 1975	17 August 1979	4 years, 93 days	1974 (Sikkim National Elections)	Indian National Congress
–		Vacant (Note: When President's rule is in force in a state, its council of ministers stands dissolved. The office of chief minister thus lies vacant. At times, the legislative assembly also stands dissolved.) (President's rule)	N/A	18 August 1979	17 October 1979	60 days	-	N/A
2		Nar Bahadur Bhandari	Soreong	18 October 1979	11 May 1984	4 years, 206 days	1979 (1st)	Sikkim Janata Parishad
3		Bhim Bahadur Gurung	Jorthang-Nayabazar	11 May 1984	25 May 1984	14 days	1979 (1st)	Indian National Congress
–		Vacant (President's rule)	N/A	25 May 1984	8 March 1985	287 days	-	N/A
(2)		Nar Bahadur Bhandari	Soreong	8 March 1985	25 November 1989	9 years, 70 days	1985 (2nd)	Sikkim Sangram Parishad
(2)		Nar Bahadur Bhandari	Soreong	26 November 1989	17 May 1994	9 years, 70 days	1989 (3rd)	Sikkim Sangram Parishad
4		Sanchaman Limboo		18 May 1994	12 December 1994	208 days	1989 (3rd)	Sikkim Sangram Parishad
5		Pawan Kumar Chamling	Damthang	13 December 1994	10 October 1999	24 years, 165 days	1994 (4th)	Sikkim Democratic Front
5		Pawan Kumar Chamling	Damthang	11 October 1999	21 May 2004	24 years, 165 days	1999 (5th)	Sikkim Democratic Front
5		Pawan Kumar Chamling	Damthang	21 May 2004	20 May 2009	24 years, 165 days	2004 (6th)	Sikkim Democratic Front
5		Pawan Kumar Chamling	Poklok-Kamrang	20 May 2009	21 May 2014	24 years, 165 days	2009 (7th)	Sikkim Democratic Front
5		Pawan Kumar Chamling	Namchi-Singhithang	21 May 2014	27 May 2019	24 years, 165 days	2014 (8th)	Sikkim Democratic Front
6		Prem Singh Tamang	Poklok-Kamrang	27 May 2019	10 June 2024	7 years, 129 days	2019 (9th)	Sikkim Krantikari Morcha
6		Prem Singh Tamang	Rhenock	10 June 2024	Incumbent	7 years, 129 days	2024 (10th)	Sikkim Krantikari Morcha

== Statistics ==
#	Chief Minister	Party	Term of office	
#	Chief Minister	Party	Longest continuous term	Total duration of chief ministership
1	Pawan Kumar Chamling	SDF	24 years, 165 days	24 years, 165 days
2	Nar Bahadur Bhandari	SJP/SSP	9 years, 70 days	13 years, 276 days
3	Prem Singh Tamang*	SKM*	7 years, 129 days*	7 years, 129 days*
4	Kazi Lhendup Dorjee	SNC/INC	4 years, 93 days	4 years, 93 days
5	Sanchaman Limboo	SSP	208 days	208 days
6	Bhim Bahadur Gurung	INC	14 days	14 days
