= Rangang–Yangang Assembly constituency =

Legislative Assembly constituency in Sikkim, India

Coordinates: 27.355°N 88.427°E

Rangang-Yangang
- Constituency No. 15 for the Sikkim Legislative Assembly

Constituency details
- Country: India
- Region: Northeast India
- State: Sikkim
- District: Namchi
- Lok Sabha constituency: Sikkim
- Established: 2008
- Total electors: 13,919
- Reservation: None

Member of Legislative Assembly
- 11th Sikkim Legislative Assembly
- Incumbent Raj Kumari Thapa
- Party: SKM
- Alliance: NDA
- Elected year: 2024

Rangang–Yangang is one of the 32 Legislative Assembly constituencies of Sikkim state in India.

It is part of Namchi district. As of 2019, it is represented by Raj Kumari Thapa of the Sikkim Democratic Front party.

== Members of the Legislative Assembly ==
Election	Member	Party
2009	Chandra Bdr Karki	Sikkim Democratic Front
2014	Pawan Kumar Chamling	Sikkim Democratic Front
2014^	Rup Narayan Chamling	Independent
2019	Raj Kumari Thapa	Sikkim Democratic Front
2024	Raj Kumari Thapa	Sikkim Krantikari Morcha

== Election results ==
=== Assembly Election 2024 ===
2024 Sikkim Legislative Assembly election: Rangang–Yangang
Party	Candidate	Votes	%	±%
SKM	Raj Kumari Thapa	6,514	50.74%	▲10.54
SDF	Mani Kumar Subba	5,313	41.38%	▼12.08
CAP–Sikkim	Anil Kumar Nepal	662	5.16%	New
BJP	Gopi Das Sharma (Pokhrel)	256	1.99%	New
NOTA	None of the Above	94	0.73%	▲0.12
Margin of victory		1,201	9.35%	▼3.91
Turnout		12,839	84.13%	▲1.54
Registered electors		15,261		▲9.64
SKM gain from SDF		Swing	▼2.73	

=== Assembly election 2019 ===
2019 Sikkim Legislative Assembly election: Rangang–Yangang
Party	Candidate	Votes	%	±%
SDF	Raj Kumari Thapa	6,146	53.47%	▼10.37
SKM	Raj Kumar Basnet	4,621	40.20%	▲7.98
Sikkim Rajya Manch	Rup Narayan Chamling	443	3.85%	New
INC	Tanka Nath Adhikari	105	0.91%	▼1.16
NOTA	None of the Above	70	0.61%	▼1.26
HSP	Kamala Rai	69	0.60%	New
Margin of victory		1,525	13.27%	▼18.36
Turnout		11,495	82.58%	▼1.89
Registered electors		13,919		▲18.34
SDF hold		Swing	▼10.37	

=== Assembly election 2014 ===
2014 Sikkim Legislative Assembly election: Rangang–Yangang
Party	Candidate	Votes	%	±%
SDF	Pawan Kumar Chamling	6,343	63.84%	▼4.40
SKM	Bikash Basnet	3,201	32.22%	New
INC	Om Prakash Bista	206	2.07%	▼26.91
NOTA	None of the Above	186	1.87%	New
Margin of victory		3,142	31.62%	▼7.63
Turnout		9,936	84.48%	▼0.96
Registered electors		11,762		▲23.38
SDF hold		Swing	▼4.40	

=== Assembly election 2009 ===
2009 Sikkim Legislative Assembly election: Rangang–Yangang
Party	Candidate	Votes	%	±%
SDF	Chandra Bdr Karki	5,558	68.24%	New
INC	Avinash Yakha	2,361	28.99%	New
Independent	Tika Ram Chettri	125	1.53%	New
Sikkim Gorkha Party	Keshav Prasad Bhattarai	101	1.24%	New
Margin of victory		3,197	39.25%	
Turnout		8,145	85.44%	
Registered electors		9,533		
SDF win (new seat)				

== See also ==
- List of constituencies of the Sikkim Legislative Assembly
- Namchi district
