= Shri Viswa Vinayaka Mandir Rhenock =

Hindu temple in Sikkim, India

Shri Viswa Vinayaka Mandir
- Shri Viswa Vinayaka Mandir
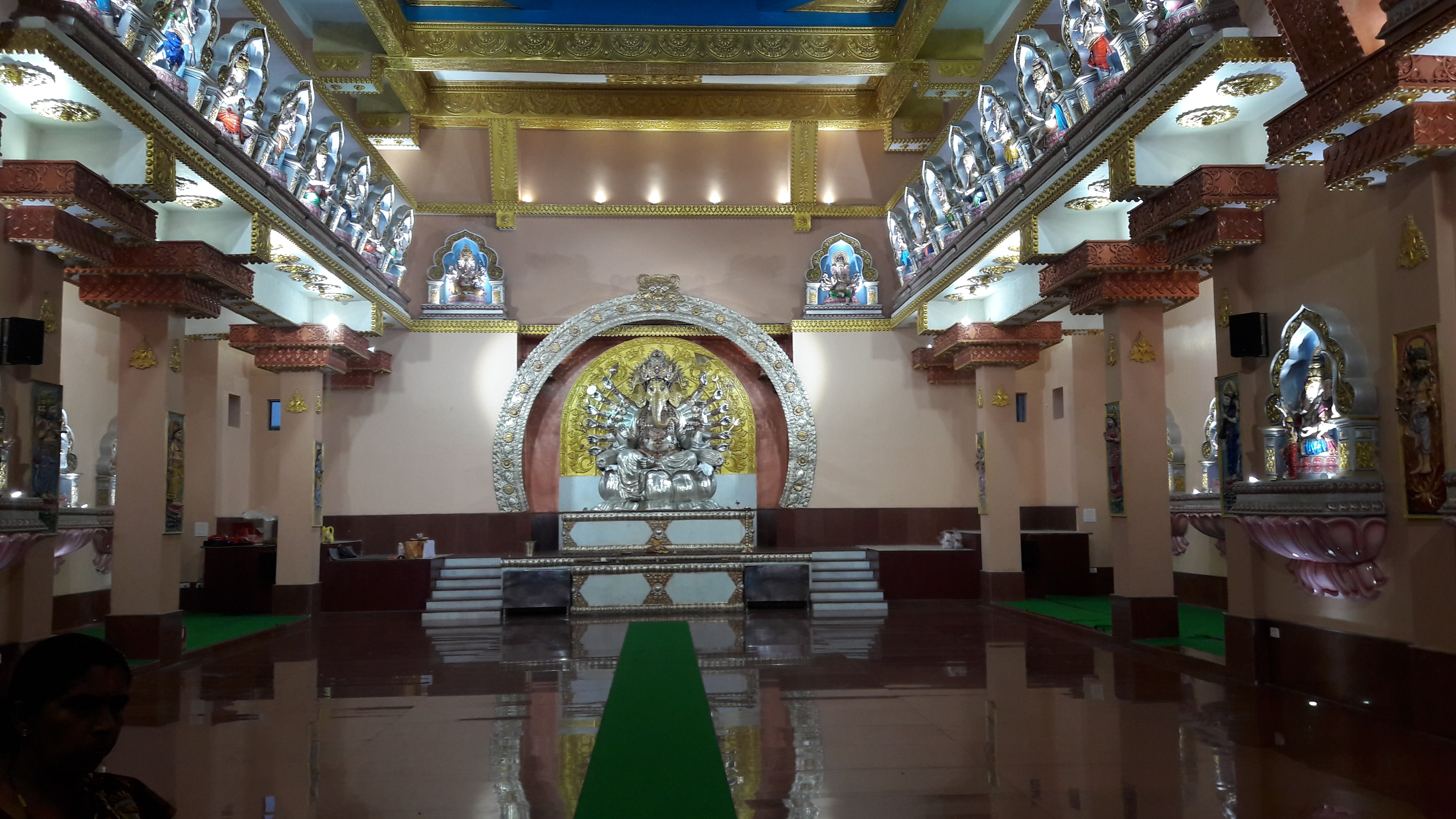
- Main entrance of Shri Viswa Vinayaka Mandir, Rhenock (Sikkim, India)

- Location in Sikkim

Religion
- Affiliation: Hinduism
- District: Pakyong district
- Deity: Ganesha

Location
- Location: Rhenock
- State: Sikkim
- Country: India
- Interactive map of Shri Viswa Vinayaka Mandir
- Coordinates: 27.17°N 88.64°E

Architecture
- Completed: 3 October 2016

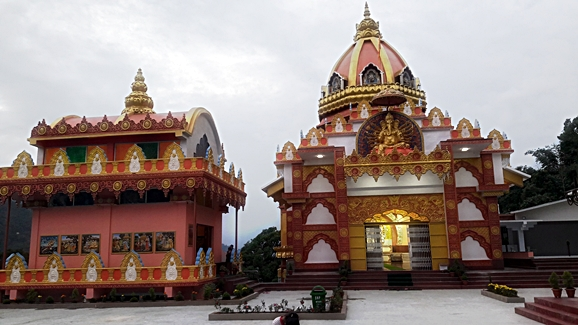
Shri Viswa Vinayaka Mandir, also called Ganesh Mandir, is a Hindu temple of Ganesha. It is located in Rhenock, Pakyong district, Sikkim, India. Sri Viswa Vinayaka Mandir was inaugurated by Shri Dinesh Chandra, general secretary of Vishva Hindu Parishad accompanied by the former chief minister, Shri Pawan Chamling, at a beautiful landscape of Rundung Village in Rhenock on 3 October 2016. This massive religious infrastructure of Hindu accords 51 faces of Lord Ganesha, with 12 feet each 16 of them placed at corridor towards temple's main entrance. Adding excitement is another attraction is the massive mythological Daemon vs Gods ‘Samudra Manthan’ statues. Shivling and statue of Hanuman is also present in Viswa Vinayak Temple.

== History ==
It was constructed on 3 October 2016. The four-storied temple stands 108 feet tall in a complex developed over a 2.56-acre plot. The mandir has been constructed on land where previously the Radha Krishna Mandir stood. Part of the land also belonged to a local resident, KB Adhikari. The temple will house 51 forms of Lord Ganesha, a first in the North East Region. While a lot of the construction material was imported from Thailand, expert artisans were brought in from Nepal and West Bengal for the construction. The main altar has a 12-foot tall statue of Lord Ganesha with 16 hands. It may be recalled that the chief minister had laid the foundation stone for the project on 20 April 2008 on the occasion of Hanuman Jayanti.

=== Architecture ===
The temple will house 51 forms of Lord Ganesha, a first in the North East Region. While a lot of the construction material was imported from Thailand, expert artisans were brought in from Nepal and West Bengal for the construction. The main altar has a 12-foot tall statue of Lord Ganesha with 16 hands.and very nice and beautiful statue of Samudra Mathan which is one of the best known episodes in Hindu mythology. The story appears in the Bhagavata Purana, the Mahabharata and the Vishnu Purana, and explains the origin of amrita, the drink of immortality.

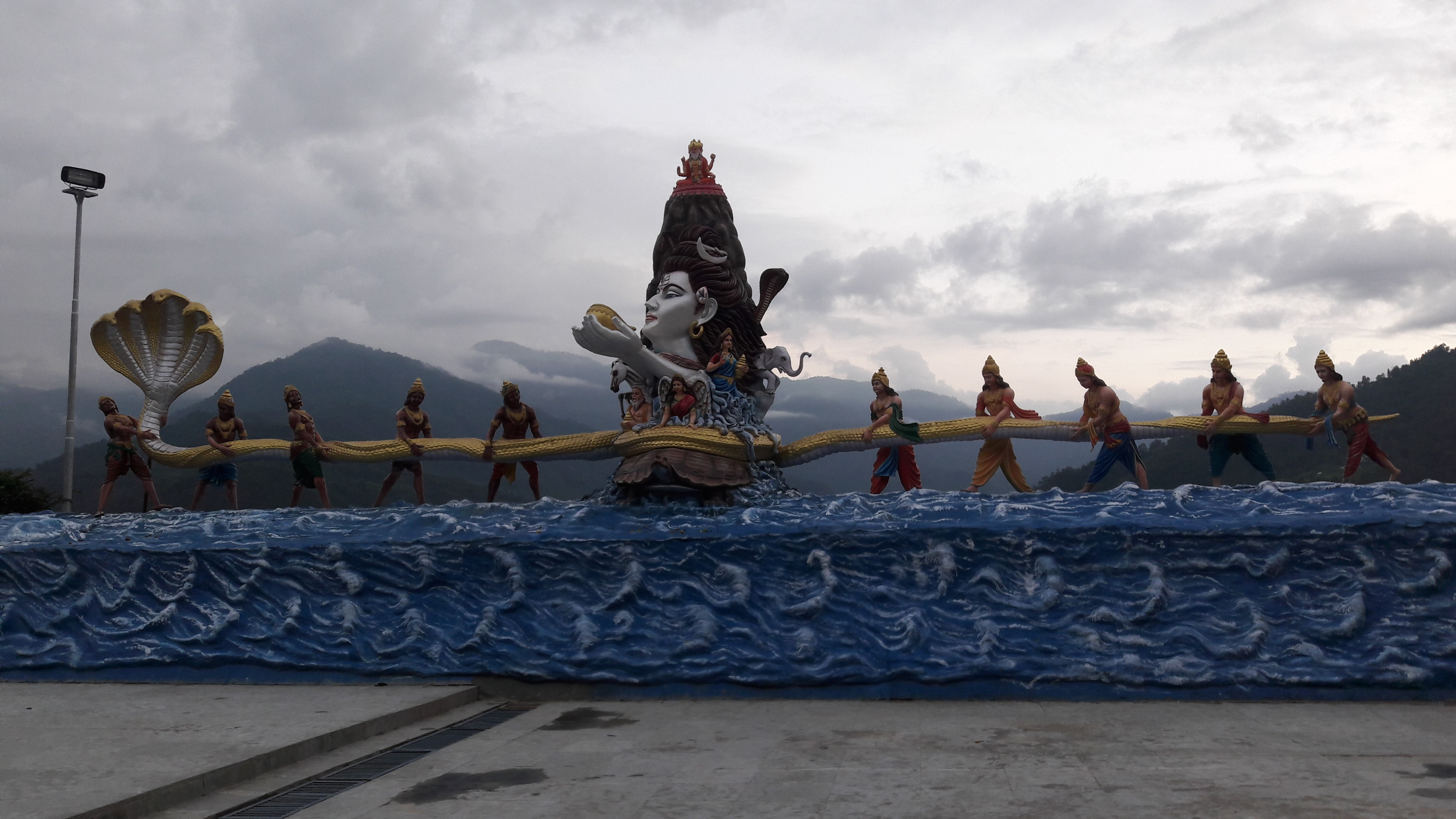
Samudra Mathan Statues

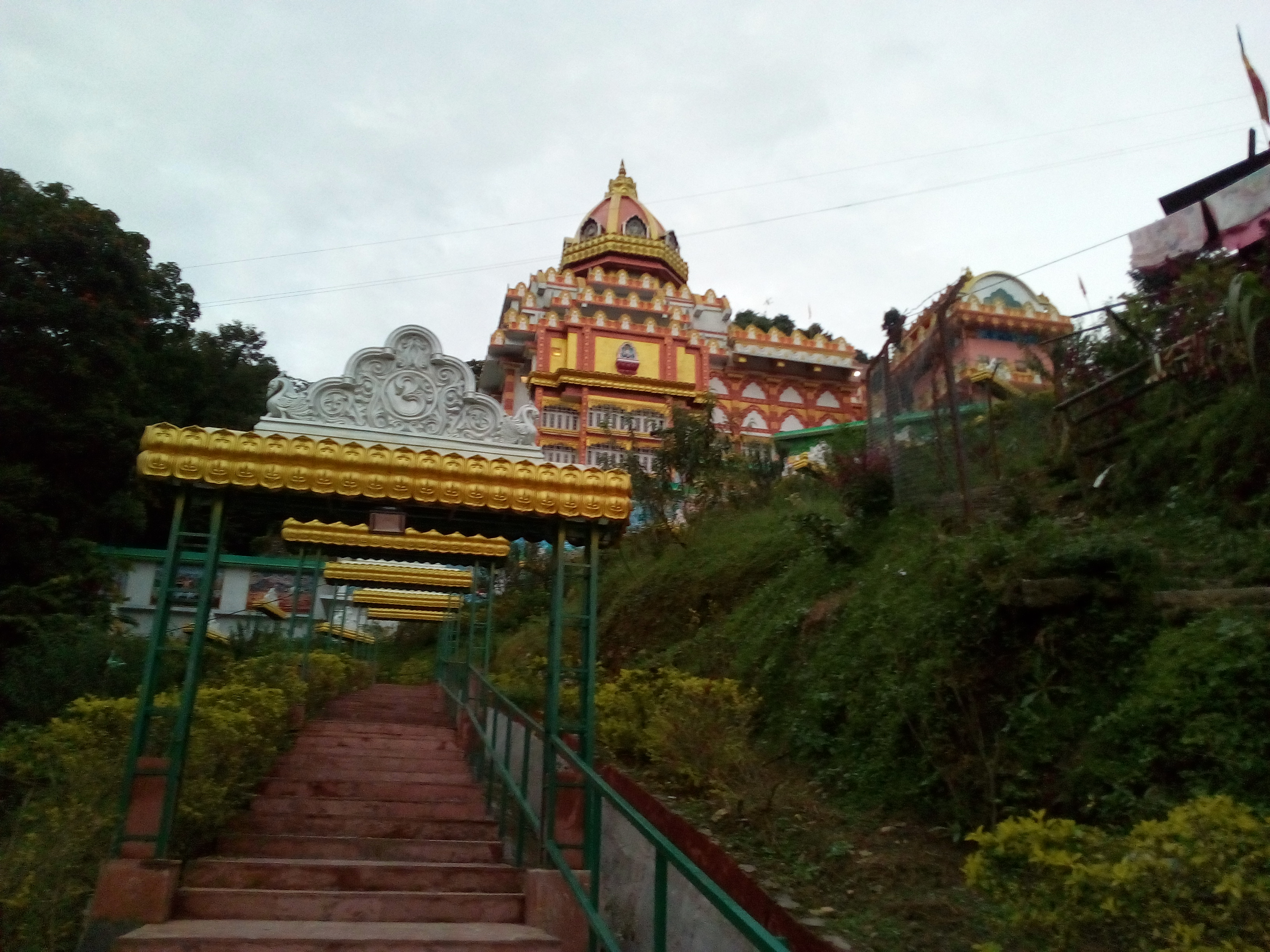
The Main Gate
