= Shyari Assembly constituency =

Constituency of the Sikkim legislative assembly in India

Coordinates: 27.315°N 88.608°E

Shyari
- Constituency No. 23 for the Sikkim Legislative Assembly

Constituency details
- Country: India
- Region: Northeast India
- State: Sikkim
- District: Gangtok
- Lok Sabha constituency: Sikkim
- Established: 2008
- Total electors: 16,196
- Reservation: BL

Member of Legislative Assembly
- 11th Sikkim Legislative Assembly
- Incumbent Tenzing Norbu Lamtha
- Party: SKM
- Alliance: NDA
- Elected year: 2024

Shyari Assembly constituency is one of the 32 assembly constituencies of Sikkim, a north east state of India. This constituency falls under Sikkim Lok Sabha constituency.

This constituency is reserved for members of the Bhutia-Lepcha community.

== Members of the Legislative Assembly ==
| Election | Member | Party |
|---|---|---|
| 2009 | Karma Tempo Namgyal Gyaltsen | Sikkim Democratic Front |
| 2014 | Kunga Nima Lepcha | Sikkim Krantikari Morcha |
| 2019 | Kunga Nima Lepcha | Sikkim Krantikari Morcha |
| 2024 | Tenzing Norbu Lamtha (Note: switched SDF to SKM) | Sikkim Krantikari Morcha |

== Election results ==
=== Assembly election 2024 ===
2024 Sikkim Legislative Assembly election: Shyari
| Party | Candidate | Votes | % | ±% |
|---|---|---|---|---|
| SDF | Tenzing Norbu Lamtha | 6,633 | 51.84% | ▲8.62 |
| SKM | Kunga Nima Lepcha | 5,319 | 41.57% | ▼12.74 |
| BJP | Pempo Dorjee Lepcha | 403 | 3.15% | N/A |
| Citizen Action Party – Sikkim | Sonam Tshering Lepcha | 268 | 2.09% | New |
| NOTA | None of the Above | 93 | 0.73% | ▼0.29 |
| INC | Karma Tashi Bhutia | 80 | 0.63% | ▼0.76 |
| Margin of victory | | 1,356 | 10.60% | ▲0.49 |
| Turnout | | 12,796 | | |
| Registered electors | | 16,196 | | |
| SDF gain from SKM | | Swing | | |

=== Assembly election 2019 ===
2019 Sikkim Legislative Assembly election: Shyari
| Party | Candidate | Votes | % | ±% |
|---|---|---|---|---|
| SKM | Kunga Nima Lepcha | 6,638 | 54.31% | ▲2.09 |
| SDF | Karma Wangdi Bhutia | 5,282 | 43.22% | ▼1.79 |
| INC | Chewang Dorjee Bhutia | 170 | 1.39% | Steady |
| NOTA | None of the Above | 132 | 1.08% | ▼0.29 |
| Margin of victory | | 1,356 | 11.09% | ▲3.87 |
| Turnout | | 12,222 | 77.69% | ▼3.07 |
| Registered electors | | 15,732 | | ▲24.63 |
| SKM hold | | Swing | ▲2.09 | |

=== Assembly election 2014 ===
2014 Sikkim Legislative Assembly election: Shyari
| Party | Candidate | Votes | % | ±% |
|---|---|---|---|---|
| SKM | Kunga Nima Lepcha | 5,324 | 52.23% | New |
| SDF | Karma Tempo Namgyal Gyaltsen | 4,588 | 45.01% | ▼18.15 |
| INC | Samdup Dorjee Lama | 142 | 1.39% | ▼33.14 |
| NOTA | None of the Above | 140 | 1.37% | New |
| Margin of victory | | 736 | 7.22% | ▼21.40 |
| Turnout | | 10,194 | 80.76% | ▼0.75 |
| Registered electors | | 12,623 | | ▲29.08 |
| SKM gain from SDF | | Swing | ▼10.93 | |

=== Assembly election 2009 ===
2009 Sikkim Legislative Assembly election: Shyari
| Party | Candidate | Votes | % | ±% |
|---|---|---|---|---|
| SDF | Karma Tempo Namgyal Gyaltsen | 5,034 | 63.15% | New |
| INC | Kunga Nima Lepcha | 2,753 | 34.54% | New |
| Sikkim Gorkha Party | Karma Tshering Sherpa | 97 | 1.22% | New |
| SHRP | Ang Tshering Bhutia | 87 | 1.09% | New |
| Margin of victory | | 2,281 | 28.62% | |
| Turnout | | 7,971 | 81.51% | |
| Registered electors | | 9,779 | | |
| SDF win (new seat) | | | | |

== See also ==
- Sikkim Lok Sabha constituency
- Gangtok district
