= Sikkim United Front Party =

Indian political party

- Abbreviation: SUFP
- Leader: Narendra Adhikari
- Founder: Narendra Adhikari
- Founded: 25 June 2018 (7 years ago)
- Headquarters: Ranipool, Sikkim, India.
- Ideology: Localism
- Colours: Yellow , White , Red
- ECI Status: Registered-Unrecognized State Party (Sikkim)
- Alliance: Sikkim Progressive Alliance (2019-present)
- Seats in Sikkim Legislative Assembly: 0 / 32

Sikkim United Front Party (SUFP) is a regional political party in the Indian state of Sikkim. The founder and incumbent President is Narendra Adhikari.

== History ==
On 25 June 2018, Narendra Adhikari established the new political party, Sikkim United Front Party (SUFP) at Ranipool, east Sikkim. In this launching ceremony, Delay Namgyal Barfungpa who is the president of Sikkim National People’s Party (SNPP) also presented.

In March 2019, SUFP participated in the electoral alliance, Sikkim Progressive Alliance (SPA) which was formed by Sikkim Sangram Parishad (SSP), Sikkim Rajya Manch Party (SRMP) and SNPP. SPA sent 8 candidates for Sikkim Legislative Assembly election, 1 candidate for Sikkim Lok Sabah election. As the SPA candidates, SUFP sent 1 candidate to Sikkim Legislative Assembly election, and nominated Narendra Adhikari to the candidate for Lok Sabha. But in this election, both candidates lost and secured only 0.44% or less votes.

SUFP didn't participate in the Bye-Election of Sikkim Legislative Assembly on 21 October 2019.

== Electoral records ==
Sikkim Legislative Assembly election

Year	Total Seats	Seats Contested	Seats Won	Forfeited Deposits	% Votes Contested	Source
2019	32	1	0	1	0.44	

Lok Sabha election, Sikkim

Year	Total Seats	Seats Contested	Seats Won	Forfeited Deposits	% Votes Contested	Source
2019	1	1	0	1	0.17	
