= West Pendam Assembly constituency =

Constituency of the Sikkim legislative assembly in India

Coordinates: 27.22°N 88.51°E

West Pendam
- Constituency No. 18 for the Sikkim Legislative Assembly

Constituency details
- Country: India
- Region: Northeast India
- State: Sikkim
- District: Pakyong
- Lok Sabha constituency: Sikkim
- Established: 2008
- Total electors: 14,984
- Reservation: SC

Member of Legislative Assembly
- 11th Sikkim Legislative Assembly
- Incumbent Lall Bahadur Das
- Party: SKM
- Alliance: NDA
- Elected year: 2024

West Pendam is one of the 32 assembly constituencies of Sikkim, a north east state of India. This constituency falls under Sikkim Lok Sabha constituency and lies in Pakyong district.

== Members of the Legislative Assembly ==
Election	Member	Party
2009	Neeru Sewa	Sikkim Democratic Front
2014	Gopal Baraily	Sikkim Krantikari Morcha
2019	Lall Bahadur Das	Sikkim Krantikari Morcha
2024	Lall Bahadur Das	Sikkim Krantikari Morcha

== Election results ==
=== Assembly Election 2024 ===
2024 Sikkim Legislative Assembly election: West Pendam
Party	Candidate	Votes	%	±%
SKM	Lall Bahadur Das	6,237	48.28%	▼1.35
SDF	Anup Thatal	4,285	33.17%	▼8.78
BJP	Bhupal Baraily	959	7.42%	▲2.31
Independent	Jagdish Cintury	731	5.66%	New
CAP–Sikkim	Madan Kumar Shiva Shanker	580	4.49%	New
NOTA	None of the Above	126	0.98%	▲0.26
Margin of victory		1,952	15.11%	▲7.42
Turnout		12,918	81.35%	▲3.38
Registered electors		15,880		▲5.98
SKM hold		Swing	▼1.35	

=== Assembly election 2019 ===
2019 Sikkim Legislative Assembly election: West Pendam
Party	Candidate	Votes	%	±%
SKM	Lall Bahadur Das	5,799	49.64%	▼2.81
SDF	Gopal Baraily	4,901	41.95%	▼1.54
BJP	Birendra Pourali	597	5.11%	▲3.58
INC	Binod Darjee	101	0.86%	▲0.14
NOTA	None of the Above	83	0.71%	▼0.39
Independent	Santosh Bardewa	64	0.55%	New
HSP	Indra Kr Suji	60	0.51%	New
Margin of victory		898	7.69%	▼1.28
Turnout		11,683	77.97%	▼4.66
Registered electors		14,984		▲20.66
SKM hold		Swing	▼2.81	

=== Assembly election 2014 ===
2014 Sikkim Legislative Assembly election: West Pendam
Party	Candidate	Votes	%	±%
SKM	Gopal Baraily	5,382	52.45%	New
SDF	K. K. Thatal	4,462	43.49%	▼10.04
BJP	Amar Lohar	157	1.53%	▼1.20
NOTA	None of the Above	113	1.10%	New
INC	Ranjeet Gazmer	74	0.72%	▼39.10
AITC	Mohan Lall Thatal(Darjee)	73	0.71%	New
Margin of victory		920	8.97%	▼4.74
Turnout		10,261	82.63%	▼0.31
Registered electors		12,418		▲32.81
SKM gain from SDF		Swing	▼1.08	

=== Assembly election 2009 ===
2009 Sikkim Legislative Assembly election: West Pendam
Party	Candidate	Votes	%	±%
SDF	Neeru Sewa	4,151	53.53%	New
INC	Jagdish Cintury	3,088	39.82%	New
BJP	S. K. Bardewa	212	2.73%	New
Sikkim Gorkha Party	Tika Ghatani	116	1.50%	New
SHRP	Tek Bahadur Thatal	73	0.94%	New
Independent	Nandalal Darjee	71	0.92%	New
NCP	Jit Man Darjee	44	0.57%	New
Margin of victory		1,063	13.71%	
Turnout		7,755	82.94%	
Registered electors		9,350		
SDF win (new seat)				

== See also ==
- Sikkim Lok Sabha constituency
- Gangtok
- Pakyong district
