= Arithang Assembly constituency =

Human settlement in West Sikkim state, India

Coordinates: 27.33°N 88.61°E

Arithang
- Constituency No. 26 for the Sikkim Legislative Assembly

Constituency details
- Country: India
- Region: Northeast India
- State: Sikkim
- District: Gangtok
- Lok Sabha constituency: Sikkim
- Established: 2008
- Reservation: None

Member of Legislative Assembly
- 11th Sikkim Legislative Assembly
- Incumbent Arun Kumar Upreti
- Party: SKM
- Alliance: NDA
- Elected year: 2024

Arithang Assembly constituency is one of the 32 assembly constituencies of Sikkim, a north east state of India. This constituency falls under Sikkim Lok Sabha constituency.

== Members of the Legislative Assembly ==
Election	Member	Party
2009	Narendra Kumar Pradhan	Sikkim Democratic Front
2014	Shyam Pradhan	Sikkim Krantikari Morcha
2019	Arun Kumar Upreti	Sikkim Krantikari Morcha
2024	Arun Kumar Upreti	Sikkim Krantikari Morcha

== Election results ==
=== Assembly Election 2024 ===
2024 Sikkim Legislative Assembly election: Arithang
Party	Candidate	Votes	%	±%
SKM	Arun Kumar Upreti	5,356	61.48%	▲21.46
SDF	Ashis Rai	2,627	30.15%	▲10.53
BJP	Udai Gurung	541	6.21%	▲1.22
CAP–Sikkim	Rikesh Pradhan	93	1.07%	New
NOTA	None of the Above	49	0.56%	▼0.28
INC	Sumitra Rai	46	0.53%	▼0.01
Margin of victory		2,729	31.32%	▲25.30
Turnout		8,712	69.13%	▲0.13
Registered electors		12,602		▲10.47
SKM hold		Swing	▲21.46	

=== Assembly election 2019 ===
2019 Sikkim Legislative Assembly election: Arithang
Party	Candidate	Votes	%	±%
SKM	Arun Kumar Upreti	3,150	40.02%	▼17.90
Independent	Ashis Rai	2,676	33.99%	New
SDF	Shyam Pradhan	1,545	19.63%	▼15.19
BJP	Dal Bahadur Chettri	393	4.99%	New
NOTA	None of the Above	66	0.84%	▼0.18
INC	Sumitra Rai	42	0.53%	▼0.98
Margin of victory		474	6.02%	▼17.08
Turnout		7,872	69.00%	▼4.22
Registered electors		11,408		▲20.17
SKM hold		Swing	▼17.90	

=== Assembly election 2014 ===
2014 Sikkim Legislative Assembly election: Arithang
Party	Candidate	Votes	%	±%
SKM	Shyam Pradhan	4,026	57.92%	New
SDF	Udai Lama	2,420	34.82%	▼26.14
Independent	Sherap Dorjee Bhutia	253	3.64%	New
INC	Gyalpo Tamang	105	1.51%	▼32.73
Independent	Rajeney Gurung	76	1.09%	New
NOTA	None of the Above	71	1.02%	New
Margin of victory		1,606	23.10%	▼3.61
Turnout		6,951	73.22%	▼0.43
Registered electors		9,493		▲28.35
SKM gain from SDF		Swing	▼3.03	

=== Assembly election 2009 ===
2009 Sikkim Legislative Assembly election: Arithang
Party	Candidate	Votes	%	±%
SDF	Narendra Kumar Pradhan	3,320	60.95%	New
INC	Bharat Basnett	1,865	34.24%	New
NCP	Ashok Kumar Subba	141	2.59%	New
SHRP	Atal Bahadur Tamang	48	0.88%	New
Independent	Amit Kumar Pradhan	46	0.84%	New
Margin of victory		1,455	26.71%	
Turnout		5,447	73.65%	
Registered electors		7,396		
SDF win (new seat)				

== See also ==
- Sikkim Lok Sabha constituency
- Gangtok district
