= Lall Bahadur Das =

Indian politician

Member of Sikkim Legislative Assembly
- Incumbent
- Assumed office May 2019
- Preceded by: Gopal Baraily
- Constituency: West Pendam

10th Speaker of the Sikkim Legislative Assembly
- In office 2019–2022
- Preceded by: Kedar Nath Rai
- Succeeded by: Arun Kumar Upreti

Personal details
- Born: Lall Bahadur Das Yangang, South, Sikkim
- Party: Sikkim Krantikari Morcha
- Profession: Retired Government Servant

Lall Bahadur Das is an Indian politician. He was elected to the Sikkim Legislative Assembly from West Pendam in the 2019 Sikkim Legislative Assembly election as a member of the Sikkim Krantikari Morcha. He was the speaker of the Sikkim Legislative Assembly. He resigned from the post of Speaker on 16 August 2022.
