= Upper Tadong Assembly constituency =

Constituency of the Sikkim legislative assembly in India

Coordinates: 27.320°N 88.597°E

Upper Tadong
- Constituency No. 25 for the Sikkim Legislative Assembly

Constituency details
- Country: India
- Region: Northeast India
- State: Sikkim
- District: Gangtok
- Lok Sabha constituency: Sikkim
- Established: 2008
- Total electors: 10,334
- Reservation: None

Member of Legislative Assembly
- 11th Sikkim Legislative Assembly
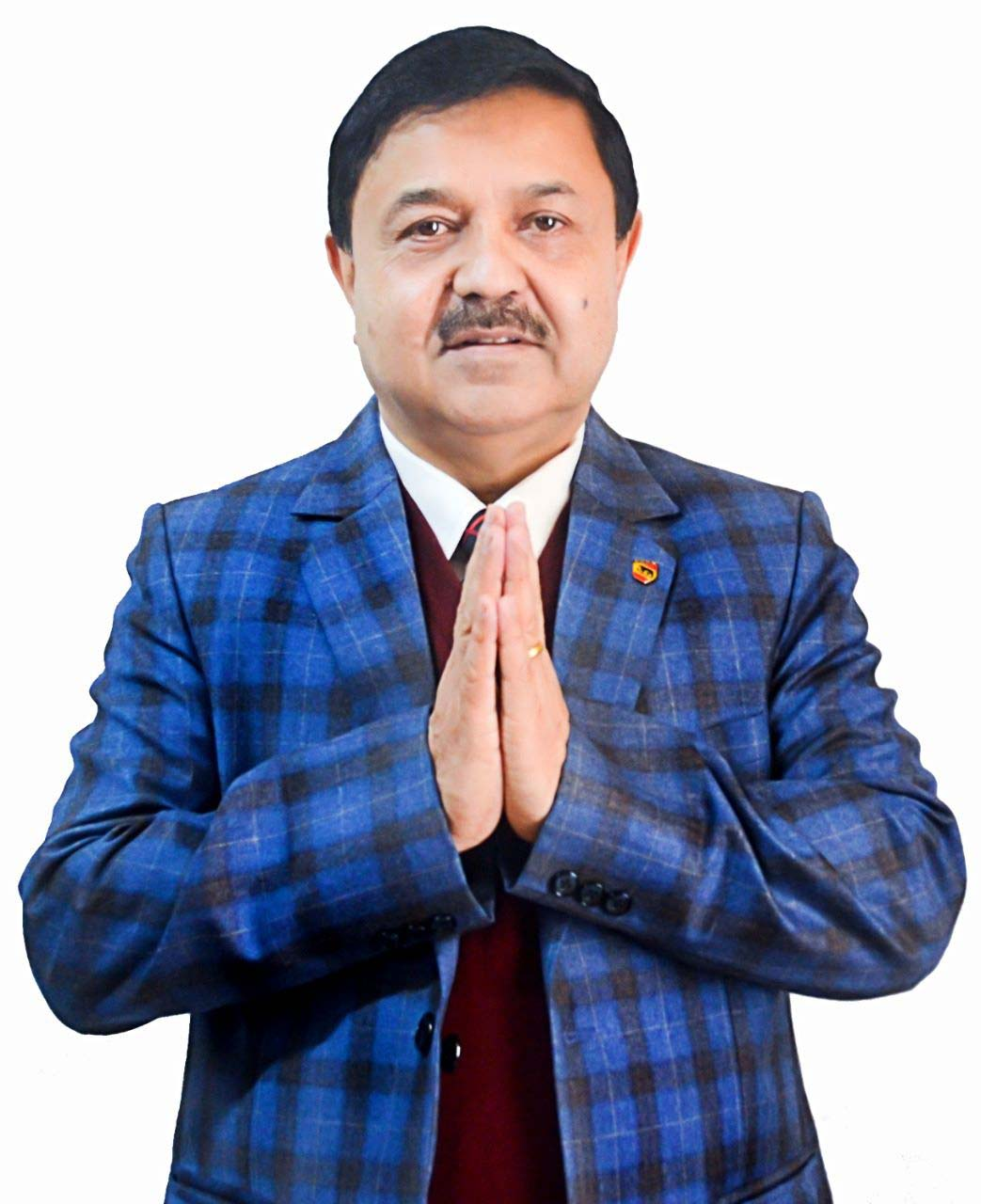
- Incumbent G. T. Dhungel
- Party: SKM
- Alliance: NDA
- Elected year: 2024

Upper Tadong Legislative Assembly constituency is one of the 32 Legislative Assembly constituencies of Sikkim state in India.

It was created after the passing of the Delimitation of Parliamentary and Assembly Constituencies Order, 2008, and is part of Gangtok district.

== Members of the Legislative Assembly ==
| Election | Member | Party |
|---|---|---|
| 2009 | Dil Bahadur Thapa | Sikkim Democratic Front |
| 2014 | Timothy William Basnett | Sikkim Krantikari Morcha |
| 2019 | Gay Tshering Dhungel | Sikkim Democratic Front |
| 2024 | Gay Tshering Dhungel | Sikkim Krantikari Morcha |

== Election results ==
=== Assembly Election 2024 ===
2024 Sikkim Legislative Assembly election: Upper Tadong
| Party | Candidate | Votes | % | ±% |
|---|---|---|---|---|
| SKM | G. T. Dhungel | 6,209 | 68.46% | ▲22.98 |
| SDF | Dr. Chandra Bahadur Chettri | 2,120 | 23.38% | ▼27.63 |
| BJP | Niren Bhandari | 280 | 3.09% | New |
| CAP–Sikkim | Ravi Gurung | 245 | 2.70% | New |
| Independent | Kailash Chandra Pradhan | 158 | 1.74% | New |
| NOTA | None of the Above | 57 | 0.63% | ▼0.11 |
| Margin of victory | | 4,089 | 45.09% | ▲39.57 |
| Turnout | | 9,069 | 74.17% | ▲1.24 |
| Registered electors | | 12,228 | | ▲18.33 |
| SKM gain from SDF | | Swing | ▲17.46 | |

=== Assembly Election 2019 ===
2019 Sikkim Legislative Assembly election: Upper Tadong
| Party | Candidate | Votes | % | ±% |
|---|---|---|---|---|
| SDF | Gay Tshering Dhungel | 3,844 | 51.01% | ▲4.18 |
| SKM | Anand Lama | 3,428 | 45.49% | ▼3.12 |
| HSP | Dr. Bina Basnett | 123 | 1.63% | New |
| INC | Anita Gurung | 69 | 0.92% | ▼0.24 |
| NOTA | None of the Above | 56 | 0.74% | New |
| Margin of victory | | 416 | 5.52% | ▲3.74 |
| Turnout | | 7,536 | 72.92% | ▼3.67 |
| Registered electors | | 10,334 | | ▲15.44 |
| SDF gain from SKM | | Swing | ▲2.40 | |

=== Assembly Election 2014 ===
2014 Sikkim Legislative Assembly election: Upper Tadong
| Party | Candidate | Votes | % | ±% |
|---|---|---|---|---|
| SKM | Timothy William Basnett | 3,333 | 48.61% | New |
| SDF | Bhasker Basnett | 3,211 | 46.83% | ▼9.18 |
| BJP | Eli Pal | 155 | 2.26% | ▲0.41 |
| INC | Tara Kumar Pradhan | 79 | 1.15% | ▼36.30 |
| NOTA | None of the Above | 79 | 1.15% | New |
| Margin of victory | | 122 | 1.78% | ▼16.78 |
| Turnout | | 6,857 | 76.60% | ▼1.47 |
| Registered electors | | 8,952 | | |
| SKM gain from SDF | | Swing | ▼7.40 | |

=== Assembly Election 2009 ===
2009 Sikkim Legislative Assembly election: Upper Tadong
| Party | Candidate | Votes | % | ±% |
|---|---|---|---|---|
| SDF | Dil Bahadur Thapa | 3,148 | 56.00% | New |
| INC | Arun Kumar Basnet | 2,105 | 37.45% | New |
| Independent | Depak Rai | 130 | 2.31% | New |
| BJP | Padam Prasad Sharma | 104 | 1.85% | New |
| SHRP | Kharka Singh Gurung | 70 | 1.25% | New |
| Sikkim Gorkha Party | Garjaman Rai | 64 | 1.14% | New |
| Margin of victory | | 1,043 | 18.56% | |
| Turnout | | 5,621 | 78.07% | |
| Registered electors | | 7,200 | | |
| SDF win (new seat) | | | | |

== See also ==
- List of constituencies of the Sikkim Legislative Assembly
- Gangtok district
