= Poklok–Kamrang Assembly constituency =

Constituency of the Sikkim legislative assembly in India

Coordinates: 27.165°N 88.320°E

Poklok-Kamrang
- Constituency for the Sikkim Legislative Assembly

Constituency details
- Country: India
- Region: Northeast India
- State: Sikkim
- District: Namchi
- Lok Sabha constituency: Sikkim
- Established: 2008
- Reservation: None

Member of Legislative Assembly
- 11th Sikkim Legislative Assembly
- Incumbent Bhoj Raj Rai
- Party: SKM
- Alliance: NDA
- Elected year: 2024

Poklok-Kamrang Assembly constituency is one of the 32 assembly constituencies of Sikkim a north east state of India. Poklok-Kamrang is part of Sikkim Lok Sabha constituency.

== Members of the Legislative Assembly ==
Election	Member	Party
2009	Pawan Kumar Chamling	Sikkim Democratic Front
2014	Kedar Nath Rai	Sikkim Democratic Front
2019	Pawan Kumar Chamling	Sikkim Democratic Front
2019 by-election	Prem Singh Tamang	Sikkim Krantikari Morcha
2024	Bhoj Raj Rai	Sikkim Krantikari Morcha

== Election results ==
=== Assembly Election 2024 ===
2024 Sikkim Legislative Assembly election: Poklok–Kamrang
Party	Candidate	Votes	%	±%
SKM	Bhoj Raj Rai	8,037	54.99%	▼28.73
SDF	Pawan Kumar Chamling	4,974	34.03%	▲19.34
BJP	Arjun Rai	739	5.06%	New
CAP–Sikkim	Sanju Rai	691	4.73%	New
NOTA	None of the Above	175	1.20%	▲0.60
Margin of victory		3,063	20.96%	▼48.06
Turnout		14,616	86.64%	▲6.29
Registered electors		16,870		▲7.20
SKM hold		Swing	▼28.73	

=== Assembly by-election 2019 ===
In 2019 Sikkim Legislative Assembly election, Pawan Kumar Chamling of the former ruling SDF won in both Poklok-Kamrang and Namchi-Singhithang constituencies, so he relinquished Poklok-Kamrang seat.

In the by-election, ruling SKM sent its president and incumbent Chief Minister, Prem Singh Tamang (P. S. Golay) to the Poklok-Kamrang constituency. Former ruling SDF participated in the Sikkim Legislative Assembly election as the opposition for the first time in 25 years. Opposition INC boycotted this by-election, and HSP didn't send its candidate to this constituency.

As a result, Prem Singh Tamang of SKM defeated his nearest rival Moses Rai of SDF.

2019 Sikkim Legislative Assembly by-election: Poklok–Kamrang
Party	Candidate	Votes	%	±%
SKM	Prem Singh Tamang	10,585	83.72%	▲46.78
SDF	Moses Rai	1,858	14.69%	▼44.40
SRP	Yadhu Kumar Rai	125	0.99%	▼0.52
NOTA	None of the Above	76	0.60%	▼0.22
Margin of victory		8,727	69.02%	▲46.86
Turnout		12,644	81.30%	▼3.55
Registered electors		15,737		▲0.91
SKM gain from SDF		Swing	▲24.62	

=== Assembly election 2019 ===
2019 Sikkim Legislative Assembly election: Poklok–Kamrang
Party	Candidate	Votes	%	±%
SDF	Pawan Kumar Chamling	7,731	59.09%	▼9.76
SKM	Kharga Bahadur Rai	4,832	36.93%	▲8.30
SRP	Yadhu Kumar Rai	197	1.51%	New
INC	Ishwar Prasad Rai	125	0.96%	▼0.03
NOTA	None of the Above	108	0.83%	New
HSP	Birkha Bahadur Rai	90	0.69%	New
Margin of victory		2,899	22.16%	▼18.06
Turnout		13,083	83.89%	▼2.28
Registered electors		15,595		▲15.72
SDF hold		Swing	▼9.76	

=== Assembly election 2014 ===
2014 Sikkim Legislative Assembly election: Poklok–Kamrang
Party	Candidate	Votes	%	±%
SDF	Kedar Nath Rai	7,996	68.85%	▼11.83
SKM	Bhoj Raj Rai	3,325	28.63%	New
NOTA	None of the Above	178	1.53%	New
INC	Ishwar Prasad Rai	115	0.99%	▼14.57
Margin of victory		4,671	40.22%	▼24.90
Turnout		11,614	86.18%	▼0.15
Registered electors		13,477		
SDF hold		Swing	▼11.83	

=== Assembly election 2009 ===
2009 Sikkim Legislative Assembly election: Poklok–Kamrang
Party	Candidate	Votes	%	±%
SDF	Pawan Kumar Chamling	7,379	80.68%	New
INC	Purna Kumari Rai	1,423	15.56%	New
BJP	Padam Pd Sharma	167	1.83%	New
Independent	Bhim Shila Rai	100	1.09%	New
Margin of victory		5,956	65.12%	
Turnout		9,146	86.32%	
Registered electors		10,595		
SDF win (new seat)				

== See also ==
- Namchi district
- List of constituencies of Sikkim Legislative Assembly
