= Hamro Sikkim Party =

Indian political party

- Abbreviation: HSP
- President: Bhaichung Bhutia
- Founder: Bhaichung Bhutia
- Founded: 31 May 2018 (7 years ago)
- Merged into: Sikkim Democratic Front
- Headquarters: Ranipool, Sikkim, India.
- Ideology: Localism
- Political position: Localism
- Colours: Blue and Orange
- ECI Status: Registered-Unrecognized State Party (Sikkim) (2019-)
- Seats in Sikkim Legislative Assembly: 0 / 32

Website
- www.hamrosikkimparty.org

Hamro Sikkim Party (abbreviated as HSP) (English: Our Sikkim Party) was a regional political party (State Party (Unrecognized)) in the Indian state of Sikkim. The incumbent president of this party is Bhaichung Bhutia. Its election symbol is a Whistle.

== History ==
=== Establishment of Hamro Sikkim Party ===
On 31 May 2018, former footballer and former member of All India Trinamool Congress (AITC), Bhaichung Bhutia established the new political party, Hamro Sikkim Party (HSP) at Daramdin, West Sikkim, for countering Sikkim Democratic Front (SDF) which was the ruling political party in Sikkim. Bhaichung Bhutia said HSP is the party for opening to a federal front or third front, and he was inspired by the Aam Aadmi Party (AAP) for fighting against corruption.

On the launching ceremony of HSP, Bhaichung Bhutia, Ran Bahadur Subba (R.B. Subba. former State Minister of SDF Government), Bina Basnett, Tirtha Sharma (former founder member of Sikkim United Front (SUF)), Dhan Singh Limboo, Tara Shrestha (former vice president of Sikkim Pradesh Congress Committee (SPCC. Sikkim branch of Indian National Congress)), Dilip Rai, Anu Sharma and Athup Lepcha (former State Minister of Sikkim Janata Parishad (SJP) Government) were elected vice presidents, and Indra Hang Subba also was one of the founding member of it. However, the post of president was kept vacant.

In August 2018, Kharananda Upreti (K.N. Upreti, former State Minister of Sikkim Sangram Parishad (SSP) Government) and Biraj Adhikari (former president of Sikkim National People’s Party (SNPP)) joined HSP. In HSP, Upreti was appointed to the advisor, and Adhikari was appointed to the spokesperson. On 15 November 2018, HSP was registered as a political party by Election Commission of India (ECI).

=== Secession of leaders ===
On 17 January 2019, Nima Lepcha (former president of Nepali Bhutia Lepcha Sadbhawana Sangathan (NEBULA)) also joined HSP, and he was appointed to the vice president of it. After a week, 24 January, vice president Bina Basnett was nominated to the president of HSP. At the same time, Bhaichung Bhutia and R.B. Subba became acting presidents.

In same month, HSP held tie-up talks with Sikkim Krantikari Morcha (SKM) and Bharatiya Janata Party (BJP) for the Sikkim Legislative Assembly Election 2019. But HSP had not been able to form any alliance with other political parties after all.

In February 2019, R.B. Subba, K.N. Upreti, Tara Shrestha and 4 other leaders seceded from HSP. They explained the 3 major reasons for quitting from HSP, namely nomination of Bina Basnett as the party president, ‘unauthorised talks’ by Bhaichung Bhutia with other political parties and differences over the Limboo-Tamang Assembly seat reservation formula. In addition, they insisted that 80% of party workers of HSP favored to nominate Upreti as the party president. Subba, Upreti and Shresta joined SDF.

In March same year, Indra Hang Subba and Tirtha Sharma also seceded from HSP, and they both joined SKM. At the same time, Indra Hang Subba was nominated to the candidate of SKM for the sole Lok Sabha Seat from Sikkim.

In contrast, Athup Lepcha, Nima Lepcha, Dhan Singh Limboo, Biraj Adhikari and some other leaders favored to Bina Basnett and Bhaichung Bhutia, remained with HSP.

=== Sikkim Legislative Assembly Election 2019 ===
In the Sikkim Legislative Assembly Election 2019 (32 constituencies), HSP nominated 22 candidates to 23 constituencies. But all candidates lost and only received 1.76% votes or less in each constituency. In Lok Sabha Election of Sikkim, HSP nominated Biraj Adhikari as their candidate, but he lost and secured only 1,998 votes (0.57%) and the 6th position of 10 candidates.

In October 2019 HSP participated the By-Election for Sikkim Legislative Assembly (3 constituencies). HSP send candidates to 2 constituencies, namely Bhaichung Bhutia recontested from Gangtok, Nima Lepcha recontested from Martam-Rumtek. Before this election, HSP (Bhaichung Bhutia) proposed a pre-poll alliance to Delay Namgyal Barfungpa (SNPP president and the candidate from Gangtok Constituency), but Barfungpa didn't accept it.

In Gangtok constituency, the candidate of BJP, Yong Tshering Lepcha elected by 2,508 (40.88%) votes, and Barfungpa became a runner-up candidate by 1,498 (24.42%) votes. The candidate of SDF, Rinzing Ongmu Bhutia secured 874 votes (14.25%) and 3rd position of 6 candidates. Meanwhile, Bhaichung Bhutia secured 579 votes (9.44%) and 4th position, and he couldn't refund his deposit of candidacy.

In Martam-Rumtek constituency, the candidate of BJP, Sonam Tshering Venchungpa elected by 8,204 (65.47%) votes, and the candidate of SDF, Nuk Tshering Bhutia became a runner-up candidate by 2,054 (16.39%). Meanwhile, Nima Lepcha secured 1,235 votes (9.86%) and 3rd position of 6 candidates, so he couldn't refund his deposit of candidacy, too.

=== Baichung Bhutia's leadership ===
In 20 September 2022 Bhaichung Bhutia was elected unanimously by party leaders and members as the new president of HSP. In October 2022 Sikkim Sangram Parishad (SSP) merged into HSP. On that time, SSP leaders handed over the flag and ‘legacy of Nar Bahadur Bhandari’ to HSP leaders. Bhaichung Bhutia and HSP accepted the flag and subsequently declared the white and red bands as the official colours of the new party flag of HSP.

Baichung Bhutia merged the Hamro Sikkim Party with Pawan Kumar Chamling led Sikkim Democratic Front in November 2023.

== Electoral records ==
Sikkim Legislative Assembly election

Year	Total Seats	Seats Contested	Seats Won	Forfeited Deposits	% Votes Contested	Source
2019	32	23	0	23	0.80	
2019 (by-election)	3	2	0	2	9.72	

Lok Sabha election, Sikkim

Year	Total Seats	Seats Contested	Seats Won	Forfeited Deposits	% Votes Contested	Source
2019	1	1	0	1	0.57	

== President ==
- 1st Bina Basnett (24 January 2019 – 20 September 2022)
- 2nd Bhaichung Bhutia (20 September 2022 –23 November 2023)
