= Sanchaman Limboo =

4th Chief Minister of Sikkim (1947–2020)

Sanchaman Limbu

4th Chief Minister of Sikkim
- In office 17 June 1994 – 12 December 1994
- Governor: R. H. Tahiliani; P. Shiv Shankar
- Preceded by: Nar Bahadur Bhandari
- Succeeded by: Pawan Kumar Chamling

Personal details
- Born: 15 January 1947 Hee Yangthang, West Sikkim, Kingdom of Sikkim
- Died: 8 November 2020 (aged 73) Gangtok, Sikkim, India
- Party: Sikkim Sangram Parishad
- Spouse: Nirmala Limbu Subba

Sanchaman Limbu (15 January 1947 – 8 November 2020) was the fourth Chief Minister of Sikkim. He was Chief Minister in Sikkim for 179 days. During his period the central act of Other Backward Classes (OBC) was enforced in Sikkim.

Limbu died on 8 November 2020 after a long illness at the age of 73.
