= Arun Kumar Upreti =

Indian politician

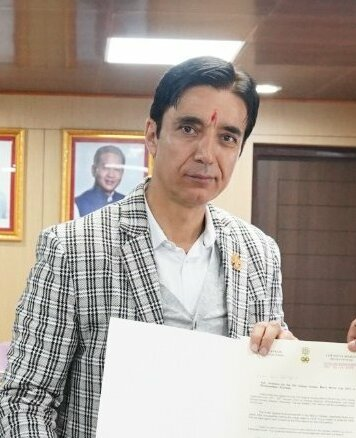
- Arun Kumar Upreti

Minister of Rural Development of Sikkim
- Incumbent
- Assumed office 11 June 2024
- Governor: Lakshman Acharya; Om Prakash Mathur
- Chief Minister: Prem Singh Tamang
- Preceded by: Sonam Lama

Minister of Co-operation of Sikkim
- Incumbent
- Assumed office 11 June 2024
- Governor: Lakshman Acharya; Om Prakash Mathur
- Chief Minister: Prem Singh Tamang
- Preceded by: Sonam Lama

Speaker of the Sikkim Legislative Assembly
- In office 22 August 2022 – 3 June 2024
- Governor: Lakshman Acharya; Ganga Prasad
- Chief Minister: Prem Singh Tamang
- Deputy: Sangay Lepcha
- Preceded by: Lall Bahadur Das
- Succeeded by: Mingma Narbu Sherpa

Minister of Urban Development of Sikkim
- In office 27 May 2019 – 22 August 2022
- Governor: Ganga Prasad
- Chief Minister: Prem Singh Tamang
- Preceded by: Narendra Kumar Subba
- Succeeded by: Lall Bahadur Das

Minister of Food and Civil Supplies of Sikkim
- In office 27 May 2019 – 22 August 2022
- Governor: Ganga Prasad
- Chief Minister: Prem Singh Tamang
- Preceded by: Narendra Kumar Subba
- Succeeded by: Lall Bahadur Das

Member of Sikkim Legislative Assembly
- Incumbent
- Assumed office May 2019
- Preceded by: Shyam Pradhan
- Constituency: Arithang

Personal details
- Born: Arun Kumar Upreti; 22 April 1967 (age 59)
- Party: Sikkim Krantikari Morcha
- Profession: Businessman

Arun Kumar Upreti is an Indian politician. He was elected to the Sikkim Legislative Assembly from Arithang in the 2019 Sikkim Legislative Assembly election as a member of the Sikkim Krantikari Morcha. He has served his tenure as Minister of Urban & Housing development, Food & Civil supplies and Consumer affairs from 2019 to 2022 in P. S. Golay Cabinet. He was the Speaker of Sikkim State Legislative Assembly.
