= Yangang =

- town
- Location in Sikkim, India Yangang (India)
- Coordinates: 27°18′N 88°26′E
- Country: India
- State: Sikkim
- District: Namchi
- Demonym(s): Lepcha, Bhuita, Nepali

Languages
  - Official: English, Nepali, Bhutia, Lepcha, Limbu, Newari, Rai, Gurung, Mangar, Sherpa, Tamang and Sunwar
- Time zone: UTC+5:30 (IST)
- Postal code: 737134
- Vehicle registration: SK

Yangang is a small town in Namchi district of the Indian state of Sikkim. Yangang is the projected site for the construction of a Sikkim University campus. Yangang is also the birthplace of the former Chief Minister of Sikkim (1994 - 2019), Shri Pawan Kumar Chamling. The state's largest police training center is in Yangang. Yangang has a number of natural tourism resources including Mainam Hill (popularly known as Bhalay-Dhunga), Tig-Day Cho lake, Neya Khola Falls, Mahadev Than, Yangang Monastery, Gurung Monastery, Lepcha Monastery, Ramitay Bhir. Yangang will soon have projects carried out in it, such as the Ropeway to Bhalay Dhunga, Sky Walk at Bhalay Dhunga, Lepcha Heritage Center, and the Cultural Park.

Notable People

Dorjee Kazi - Former Minister Pawan Kumar Chamling - 5th Chief Minister of Sikkim BM Ramudamu - Former Minister CB Karki - Former Minister Ugen T Gyatsho - Former Minister LB Das - Speaker, Sikkim Legislative Assembly RN Chamling - Former MLA Nimthit Lepcha - Former MLA Bikash Basnet - Press Secretary to Chief Minister
