= Raj Kumari Thapa =

Indian politician

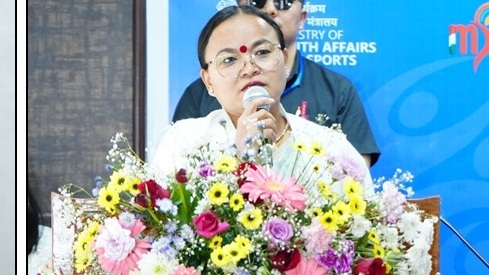
- Smt. Raj Kumari Thapa at Sikkim State Level Viksit Bharat on March 30, 2025

12th Deputy Speaker of the Sikkim Legislative Assembly
- Incumbent
- Assumed office 12 June 2024
- Governor: Lakshman Acharya; Om Prakash Mathur
- Chief Minister: Prem Singh Tamang
- Speaker: Mingma Narbu Sherpa
- Preceded by: Sangay Lepcha

Member of the Sikkim Legislative Assembly
- Incumbent
- Assumed office 3 June 2019
- Preceded by: Pawan Kumar Chamling
- Constituency: Rangang-Yangang

Personal details
- Born: 10 April 1980 (age 46)
- Party: Sikkim Krantikari Morcha
- Other political affiliations: Sikkim Democratic Front (till 2019); Bharatiya Janata Party (2019–2024)
- Spouse: Moh Bahadur Gurung

Raj Kumari Thapa (born 10 April 1980) is an Indian politician from Sikkim belonging from the Sikkim Krantikari Morcha. She is currently 12th deputy speaker of assembly. She has been elected in Sikkim Legislative Assembly election in 2019 from Rangang-Yangang constituency as candidate of Sikkim Democratic Front but later she joined Bharatiya Janata Party.
