= Yong Tshering Lepcha =

Indian politician

MLA Yong Tshering Lepcha

Member of Legislative Assembly for Gangtok
- In office 2019 (by-elections) – 2024
- Succeeded by: Delay Namgyal Barfungpa

Personal details
- Party: Bharatiya Janata Party

Yong Tshering Lepcha is an Indian politician. He was elected to the Sikkim Legislative Assembly from Gangtok in the 2019 by-election as a member of the Bharatiya Janata Party.
