= Nar Bahadur Bhandari =

2nd Chief Minister of Sikkim, India

2nd and 4th Chief Minister of Sikkim
- In office 8 March 1985 – 17 June 1994
- Governor: Kona Prabhakara Rao; Bhishma Narain Singh (Additional Charge); T. V. Rajeswar; S. K. Bhatnagar; R. H. Tahiliani
- Preceded by: B. B. Gurung
- Succeeded by: Sanchaman Limboo
- In office 18 October 1979 – 11 May 1984
- Governor: B. B. Lal; Homi J. H. Taleyarkhan
- Preceded by: Kazi Lhendup Dorjee
- Succeeded by: B. B. Gurung

Member of Parliament, Lok Sabha
- In office 1984–1985
- Constituency: Sikkim

Personal details
- Born: 5 October 1940 Malbasy, Soreng, Kingdom of Sikkim
- Died: 16 July 2017 (aged 76) New Delhi, India
- Party: Sikkim Sangram Parishad
- Other political affiliations: INC (2004-2009)& SKM (2014-2017)
- Spouse: Dil Kumari Bhandari

Nar Bahadur Bhandari (5 October 1940 – 16 July 2017) was an Indian politician who served as the chief minister of the state of Sikkim from 1979 to 1994. He briefly served as Member of Parliament representing Sikkim Lok Sabha constituency from 1984 to 1985. He was the founding leader of the Sikkim Sangram Parishad. He was popularly remembered for his efforts to include the Nepali language in 8th Schedule of the Constitution of India. He was awarded with prestigious Jagadamba Shree Purasakar for his contribution for Nepali language. He was the first Indian chief minister of Gorkha origin. He also served as the president of Bharatiya Nepali Bhasha Parisangh until his death. He is popularly known as the architect of modern Sikkim.

== Personal life ==
Nar Bahadur Bhandari was born on 5 October 1940 in Malbasay village, near Soreng, West Sikkim He earned his BA degree from Darjeeling Government College and worked as a school teacher for some years before entering politics. His wife, Dil Kumari Bhandari, is a former member of parliament (Lok Sabha) from Sikkim. He has three daughters and son.

== Politics ==
Bhandari founded the Sikkim Janata Parishad in 1977. This party won the state assembly election in 1979, and he became the chief minister for the first time on 18 October 1979. In 1984, he also served briefly as member of parliament from the Sikkim constituency in the 8th Lok Sabha as an independent candidate. In 1984, Bhandari dissolved Sikkim Janata Parishad and formed a new party called Sikkim Sangram Parishad (SSP). This party ran in the assembly elections in 1985 and won, and Bhandari became the chief minister for the second time.

In 1989, SSP returned to power by winning the assembly elections. In a rare instance in Indian national politics, the SSP became the singular party in the Sikkim Legislative Assembly, winning all 32 seats in the house. In 1994, Bhandari lost a vote of confidence in the state assembly, and he resigned as chief minister. Later, he served as a member of the legislative assembly from 1994 to 2004.

In 1994, SSP lost the assembly elections to the Sikkim Democratic Front led by Pawan Kumar Chamling. SSP also lost the 1999 assembly election. In the 2004 state assembly elections, Bhandari ran under the Indian National Congress, which managed to win only one seat in the assembly. In May 2007, he was sentenced to prison for one month in a corruption case. Again in the 2009 assembly elections, the Congress party under Bhandari failed to win any seat in the state assembly.

Bhandari became the president of the Sikkim Pradesh Congress Committee (SPCC) after he had merged SSP with the Indian National Congress in 2003. In May 2013, he was reinstated as the president of SSP. In 2014, he was convicted in a CBI corruption case.

His notable political accomplishments are free education from elementary to graduate school, establishing nearby schools—within a radius of 3 to 4 km—for all residents, providing drinking water to every household in Sikkim, building a network of roads to all major villages in Sikkim, bringing all rural areas onto the electric grid, and the setup of vast healthcare centers.

== Later life and death ==
In the 2014 election, his party unanimously supported a new political party Sikkim Krantikari Morcha, under the leadership of PS Golay. Bhandari, despite his conviction in a corruption case continued campaigning for SKM which managed to win only 10 seats out of 32. Prior to his death, he was closely involved with the SKM party; he gave his last speech at the SKM Foundation Day Celebration in Singtam on 4 February 2017.

Bhandari died on 16 July 2017 following spinal surgery.

His final rites were performed with full state honours by the current chief minister, Pawan Kumar Chamling, including a 21-gun salute. In a very rare gesture, the family of the former king of Sikkim sent their royal flag to be wrapped around Bhandari's body during the state funeral.

== Electoral records ==
Sikkim Legislative Assembly election

Year	Constituency	Political Party	Result	Position	Votes	% Votes	% Margin	Deposit	Source
1979	Soreong	SJP	Won	1st/7	1,833	70.26	+55.88	refunded	
1985	Soreong	SSP	Won	1st/5	2,964	80.48	+63.29	refunded	
1989	Soreong	SSP	Won	1st/3	4,712	91.53	+83.76	refunded	
1994	Soreong	SSP	Won	1st/4	3,291	51.83	+6.38	refunded	
1999	Soreong	SSP	Lost	2nd/3	3,390	48.85	-0.95	refunded	
1999	Rhenock	SSP	Won	1st/4	3,364	55.97	+13.11	refunded	
2004	Central Pendam–East Pendam	INC	Lost	2nd/4	2,165	22.77	-36.34	refunded	
2004	Gangtok	INC	Lost	2nd/4	2,829	31.70	-34.99	refunded	
2009	Soreng-Chakung	INC	Lost	2nd/5	2,378	24.34	-42.16	refunded	
2009	Khamdong-Singtam	INC	Lost	2nd/3	3,032	39.76	-16.60	refunded	

Lok Sabha election, Sikkim

Year	Constituency	Political Party	Result	Position	Votes	% Votes	% Margin	Deposit	Source
1984	Sikkim	Independent	Won	1st/8	56,614	68.50	+42.69	refunded	
1996	Sikkim	SSP	Lost	2nd/7	42,175	24.50	-47.65	refunded	
