= Pawan Kumar Chamling =

Indian politician, writer, former and 5th Chief Minister of Sikkim (born 1950)

Pawan Kumar Chamling Rai
- पवन कुमार चाम्लिङ राई
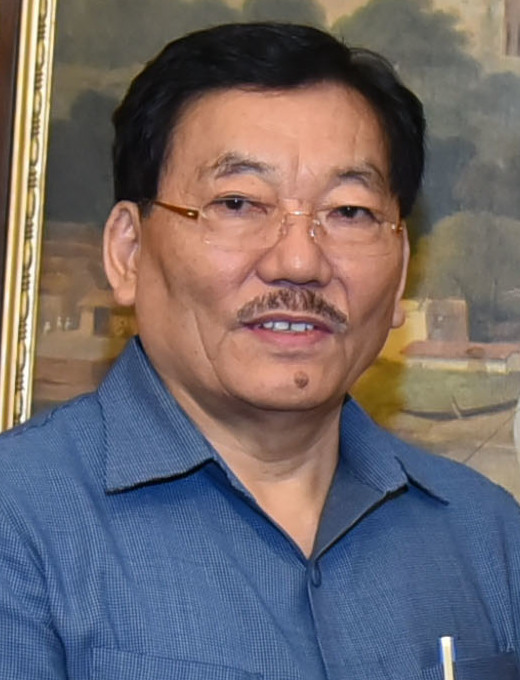
- Chamling in 2014

5th Chief Minister of Sikkim
- In office 12 December 1994 – 26 May 2019
- Governor: Chaudhary Randhir Singh; Kidar Nath Sahani; V. Rama Rao; R. S. Gavai; Sudarshan Agarwal; Balmiki Prasad Singh; M. K. Narayanan; Shriniwas Patil; Ganga Prasad
- Preceded by: Sanchaman Limboo
- Succeeded by: Prem Singh Tamang

Leader of the Opposition, Sikkim Legislative Assembly
- In office 3 June 2019 – 13 August 2019
- Preceded by: Prem Singh Tamang
- Succeeded by: Vacant

Member of Sikkim Legislative Assembly
- Constituency: Namchi-Singhithang (2014-2024); Poklok–Kamrang(2009-2014); Damthang (1985-2004)

President of Sikkim Democratic Front
- Incumbent
- Assumed office 4 March 1993

Personal details
- Born: 22 September 1950 (age 76) Yangang, Kingdom of Sikkim (present-day Sikkim, India)
- Party: Sikkim Democratic Front
- Spouse(s): Dhan Maya Chamling Rai; Tika Maya Chamling Rai
- Children: 8
- Profession: Politician; Writer
- Website: www.pawanchamling.com

Pawan Kumar Chamling Rai (born 22 September 1950) is an Indian politician and writer of Sikkimese descent who served as the 5th Chief Minister of Sikkim from 12 December 1994 to 26 May 2019. He is the longest serving Chief Minister in India, surpassing Naveen Patnaik. Chamling is the Founder-President of the Sikkim Democratic Front. He also served as the Leader of the opposition, Sikkim Legislative Assembly in the year of 2019. He represented the Namchi-Singhithang constituency in the Sikkim Legislative Assembly since 2019 till 2024 and the Damthang constituency from 1985 to 1994. Prior to establishing the Sikkim Democratic Front, Chamling served as Minister for Industries, Information and Public Relations from 1989 to 1992 in Nar Bahadur Bhandari's cabinet.

== Personal life ==
Chamling was born in Yangang, South Sikkim to Nepali parents Ash Bahadur Chamling Rai and Asha Rani Chamling Rai. Chamling is also a prolific Nepali language writer, and recipient of the Bhanu Puraskar (2010) awarded by Sikkim Sahitya Parishad. He writes under the pen name Pawan Chamling. Mr. Chamling has two wives and 8 children (4 sons and 4 daughters).

== Political career ==
Chamling was elected as the president of Yangang Gram Panchayat in 1982. In 1985, he was elected to the Sikkim Legislative Assembly for the first time. After being elected for the second time from Damthang, he became the Minister for Industries, Information and Public Relations from 1989 to 1992 in the Nar Bahadur Bhandari cabinet. After a series of major political upheavals in Sikkim, Chamling formed the Sikkim Democratic Front on 4 March 1993.

Chamling is the second chief minister in India after Jyoti Basu, of West Bengal to govern a state five terms in a row, with his party Sikkim Democratic Front winning the 1994, 1999, 2004, 2009 and 2014 Sikkim Legislative Assembly elections. His party first came to power in Sikkim after winning the 1994 Sikkim assembly elections. His popularity kept soaring in Sikkim due to his developmental work and for maintaining peace. In 2009, his party Sikkim Democratic Front won all 32 assembly seats in Sikkim Legislative Assembly.

In 2012, he faced allegations of corruption and Bhandari, his predecessor as CM, predicted that Chamling would go to jail if he lost his power. And his former comrade Tamang (Golay) developed differences with him and floated his own party. These developments created political challenge for him, but he managed to win the assembly elections of 2014, albeit with a much reduced majority.

Following win in 2014 assembly election, he was sworn in as the Chief Minister of Sikkim for the fifth consecutive time on 21 May 2014 by Shriniwas Dadasaheb Patil, the Governor of Sikkim. He became the chief minister for a fifth time, a record previously held by Jyoti Basu who ruled West Bengal from 1977 to 2000.

His party SDF won 22 out of 32 assembly seats in the 2014 legislative assembly election. 18 months after the 2014 elections, on 30 November 2015, 7 out of 10 opposition MLAs joined the SDF party under the leadership of Pawan Chamling. The ruling front had 29 out of 32 assembly seats in the state.

Chamling resigned as CM after 2019 Sikkim Legislative Assembly election as former member Prem Singh Tamang's Sikkim Krantikari Morcha party formed the government by winning 17 seats out of 32. SDF party won the remaining 15 seats. Two of the SDF legislators had won from two seats each of which one had to be given up, reducing their strength to 13. In August 2019, 10 MLAs quit his party to join Bharatiya Janata Party and in the same month two other legislators joined Sikkim Krantikari Morcha. Thus making Chamling only MLA of the party. Chamling lost the 2024 Sikkim Legislative Assembly election from both the seats he contested, marking his first electoral defeat.

=== Electoral records ===
Sikkim Legislative Assembly election

Year	Constituency	Political Party	Result	Position	Votes	% Votes	% Margin	Deposit	Source
1985	Damthang	Sikkim Sangram Parishad	Won	1st/8	2,281	73.79	+57.00	refunded	
1989	Damthang	Sikkim Sangram Parishad	Won	1st/2	4,227	94.27	+88.54	refunded	
1994	Damthang	Sikkim Democratic Front	Won	1st/4	3,904	70.27	+43.93	refunded	
1999	Damthang	Sikkim Democratic Front	Won	1st/3	4,952	72.26	+45.03	refunded	
2004	Damthang	Sikkim Democratic Front	Won	1st/1	-			refunded	
2009	Poklok-Kamrang	Sikkim Democratic Front	Won	1st/6	7,379	80.68	+65.12	refunded	
2009	Namchi-Singhithang	Sikkim Democratic Front	Won	1st/6	5,653	80.97	+66.51	refunded	
2014	Namchi-Singhithang	Sikkim Democratic Front	Won	1st/3	4,774	55.08	+12.67	refunded	
2014	Rangang-Yangang	Sikkim Democratic Front	Won	1st/3	6,343	63.84	+32.23	refunded	
2019	Poklok-Kamrang	Sikkim Democratic Front	Won	1st/5	7,731	59.09	+22.16	refunded	
2019	Namchi-Singhithang	Sikkim Democratic Front	Won	1st/5	5,054	50.31	+3.75	refunded	
2024	Poklok-Kamrang	Sikkim Democratic Front	Lost	2nd/5	4,974	34.03	-20.96	refunded	
2024	Namchaybong	Sikkim Democratic Front	Lost	2nd/5	4,939	36.67	-16.75	refunded	

== See also ==
- List of longest-serving Indian chief ministers
- List of chief ministers of Sikkim

Political offices
Preceded by Sanchaman Limboo	Chief Minister of Sikkim; 12 December 1994 – 27 May 2019	Succeeded by Prem Singh Tamang
