= 2009 Sikkim Legislative Assembly election =

2009 election of the Indian state assembly of Sikkim

- 30 April 2009

All 32 seats in the Sikkim Legislative Assembly 17 seats needed for a majority
- Turnout: 83.78%
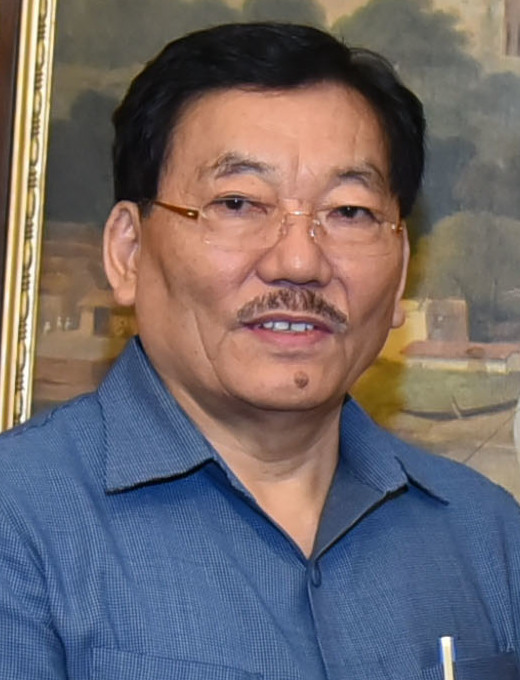

	Majority party	Minority party
Leader	Pawan Kumar Chamling	Nar Bahadur Bhandari
Party	SDF	INC
Alliance	UPA	UPA
Leader since	1994
Leader's seat	Poklok–Kamrang	Soreng–Chakung, Tumin–Lingee (both lost)
Last election	31	1
Seats won	32	0
Seat change	▲1	▼1
Popular vote	165,991	69,612
Percentage	65.91%	27.64%
Swing	▼5.18%	▲1.51%
Chief Minister before election
Pawan Kumar Chamling
SDF
Elected Chief Minister
Pawan Kumar Chamling
SDF

The Sikkim Legislative Assembly election of 2009 took place in April 2009, concurrently with the 2009 Indian general election. The elections were held in the state for all 32 legislative assembly seats along with the third phase of 2009 Indian general elections on 30 April 2009. The results were declared on 5 May 2009. The Sikkim Democratic Front (SDF) further strengthened their majority in the Sikkim Assembly by winning all the seats. Incumbent Chief Minister Pawan Kumar Chamling's Government returned for an unprecedented fourth consecutive term having won previous elections in 1994, 1999, and 2004.

== Previous Assembly ==
In the 2004 Sikkim Legislative Assembly election, the SDF almost had a clean-sweep winning 31 of the 32 seats in the state. Congress was the only other party to win any seats, winning the Sangha seat that is reserved for the monks and nuns of Sikkim's many monasteries. The Chamling-led SDF had already formed the previous two Governments in Sikkim having first formed the Government after the 1994 election, when they won 19 seats within a year of the party being formed), and then again after the 1999 election, when they increased their tally to 24 seats. Chamling's third term began on May 21, 2004, when he and his 11 cabinate ministers were sworn in by the then Governor of Sikkim V. Rama Rao.

== Background ==
With the tenure of the Sikkim Assembly scheduled to expire on 23 May 23, 2009, the Election Commission of India announced on 2 March 2009, that the elections to the Sikkim Assembly would be held at the same time as the general election. Sikkim voted in the third phase of the 5-phase national election.

Though SDF had provided external support to Manmohan Singh's Congress-led UPA Government at the Centre since 2004, the SDF and Congress were the main political opponents in Sikkim. Ironically, the Congress was led in the state by Nar Bahadur Bhandari, mentor and former colleague of Chamling.

In this election UDF was formed by coalition of BJP, INC and few other parties, which was thrown into disarray with its constituents appearing to go separate.

=== Schedule of election ===
Poll Event	Dates
Announcement & Issue of Press Note	Monday, 02 Mar 2009
Issue of Notification	Thursday, 02 Apr 2009
Last Date for filing Nominations	Thursday, 09 Apr 2009
Scrutiny of Nominations	Friday, 10 Apr 2009
Last date for withdrawal of Candidature	Monday, 13 Apr 2009
Date of Poll	Thursday, 30 Apr 2009
Counting of Votes on	Saturday, 16 May 2009
Date of election being completed	Saturday, 23 May 2009
Constituencies Polling on this day	32
Source: Election Commission of India

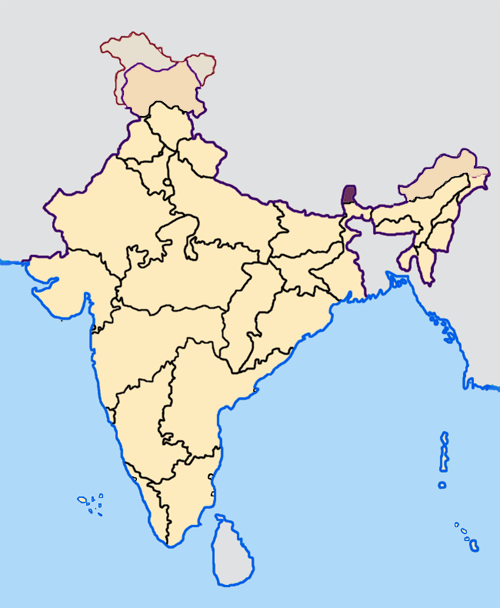
Location of Sikkim in India

== Parties Contested ==
Party Type	Code	Party name	Number of candidates	Total
National Parties	BJP	Bharatiya Janata Party	11	57
National Parties	CPM	Communist Party of India (Marxist)	3	57
National Parties	INC	Indian National Congress	32	57
National Parties	NCP	Nationalist Congress Party	11	57
State Parties	SDF	Sikkim Democratic Front	32	32
Unrecognised or Unregistered Parties	SGPP	Sikkim Gorkha Prajatantrik Party	27	53
Unrecognised or Unregistered Parties	SHRP	Sikkim Himali Rajya Parishad	20	53
Unrecognised or Unregistered Parties	SJEP	Sikkim Jan-Ekta Party	6	53
Independents	n/a	Independents	25	25
Total:				167
Source: Election Commission of India

== Results ==
The SDF went from strength to strength and this time won even the single seat that had eluded them in 2004. With a clean sweep of all 32 seats in the state, Chamling was sworn in for his fourth consecutive term as Chief Minister by Governor B.P. Singh at the Gangtok Raj Bhawan on May 20, 2009. This Government included Neeru Sewa and Tilu Gurung who became the first ever women Cabinet ministers in Sikkim.

Party	Votes	%	Seats	+/–
Sikkim Democratic Front	165,991	65.91	32	+1
Indian National Congress	69,612	27.64	0	–1
Sikkim Himali Rajya Parishad	5,516	2.19	0	0
Sikkim Gorkha Prajatantrik Party	2,909	1.16	0	New
Bharatiya Janata Party	1,966	0.78	0	0
Nationalist Congress Party	1,065	0.42	0	New
Sikkim Jan-Ekta Party	497	0.20	0	New
Communist Party of India (Marxist)	272	0.11	0	0
Independents	4,023	1.60	0	0
Total	251,851	100.00	32	0
Valid votes	251,851	99.65		
Invalid/blank votes	885	0.35		
Total votes	252,736	100.00		
Registered voters/turnout	300,584	84.08		
Source: CEO Sikkim

=== Results by constituency ===
Winner, runner-up, voter turnout, and victory margin in every constituency
Assembly Constituency		Turnout	Winner				Runner Up				Margin
#k	Names	%	Candidate	Party	Votes	%	Candidate	Party	Votes	%	Margin
1	Yoksam–Tashiding	86.94%	Dawcho Lepcha	SDF	5,909	71.75%	Aden Tshering Lepcha	INC	1,666	20.23%	4,243
2	Yangthang	85.99%	Prem Lall Subba	SDF	5,770	73.19%	Depan Hang Limbu	INC	1,545	19.6%	4,225
3	Maneybong–Dentam	86.75%	Chandra Maya Subba	SDF	6,252	71.99%	Laxuman Gurung	INC	1,899	21.87%	4,353
4	Gyalshing–Barnyak	84.32%	Man Bahadur Dahal	SDF	4,967	68.13%	Youa Raj Rai	INC	1,557	21.36%	3,410
5	Rinchenpong	86.96%	Dawa Norbu Takarpa	SDF	6,438	72.69%	Pema Kinzang Bhutia	INC	2,145	24.22%	4,293
6	Daramdin	84.83%	Tenzi Sherpa	SDF	6,507	68.97%	Pem Nuri Sherpa	INC	1,807	19.15%	4,700
7	Soreng–Chakung	84.62%	Ram Bahadur Subba	SDF	6,497	66.5%	Nar Bahadur Bhandari	INC	2,378	24.34%	4,119
8	Salghari–Zoom	84.62%	Madan Cintury	SDF	4,437	65.14%	Janga Bir Darnal	INC	2,139	31.4%	2,298
9	Barfung	85.78%	Sonam Gyatso Bhutia	SDF	6,049	70.35%	Lobzang Bhutia	INC	2,197	25.55%	3,852
10	Poklok–Kamrang	86.32%	Pawan Kumar Chamling	SDF	7,379	80.68%	Purna Kumari Rai	INC	1,423	15.56%	5,956
11	Namchi–Singhithang	76.84%	Pawan Kumar Chamling	SDF	5,653	80.97%	Khush Bahadur Rai	INC	1,009	14.45%	4,644
12	Melli	83.83%	Tulshi Devi Rai	SDF	6,307	67.48%	Dil Kri. Chhetri	INC	2,454	26.25%	3,853
13	Namthang–Rateypani	82.7%	Tilu Gurung	SDF	5,988	65.76%	Suk Bahadur Tamang	INC	2,777	30.5%	3,211
14	Temi–Namphing	84.96%	Bedu Singh Panth	SDF	4,577	52.14%	Lalit Sharma	INC	2,837	32.32%	1,740
15	Rangang–Yangang	85.44%	Chandra Bdr Karki	SDF	5,558	68.24%	Avinash Yakha	INC	2,361	28.99%	3,197
16	Tumin–Lingee	84.9%	Ugyen Tshering Gyatso Bhutia	SDF	5,026	55.33%	Phuchung Bhutia	INC	3,702	40.75%	1,324
17	Khamdong–Singtam	84.24%	Am Prasad Sharma	SDF	4,298	56.37%	Nar Bahadur Bhandari	INC	3,032	39.76%	1,266
18	West Pendam	82.94%	Neeru Sewa	SDF	4,151	53.53%	Jagdish Cintury	INC	3,088	39.82%	1,063
19	Rhenock	84.97%	Bhim Prasad Dhungel	SDF	5,611	53.72%	Kedar Nath Sharma	INC	4,168	39.9%	1,443
20	Chujachen	83.92%	Puran Kumar Gurung	SDF	8,077	74.35%	Harka Raj Gurung	INC	2,114	19.46%	5,963
21	Gnathang–Machong	85.78%	L.M. Lepcha	SDF	4,077	58.59%	Chhopel Dzongpo Bhutia	SHRP	1,677	24.1%	2,400
22	Namchaybong	86.49%	Bek Bahadur Rai	SDF	5,877	63.37%	Em Prasad Sharma	INC	2,954	31.85%	2,923
23	Shyari	81.51%	Karma Tempo Namgyal Gyaltsen	SDF	5,034	63.15%	Kunga Nima Lepcha	INC	2,753	34.54%	2,281
24	Martam–Rumtek	85.29%	Menlom Lepcha	SDF	6,392	64.04%	Rinzing Namgyal	INC	3,027	30.33%	3,365
25	Upper Tadong	78.07%	Dil Bahadur Thapa	SDF	3,148	56.%	Arun Kumar Basnet	INC	2,105	37.45%	1,043
26	Arithang	73.65%	Narendra Kumar Pradhan	SDF	3,320	60.95%	Bharat Basnett	INC	1,865	34.24%	1,455
27	Gangtok	70.38%	Dorjee Namgyal Bhutia	SDF	3,506	61.18%	Tshering Gyatso Kaleon	INC	1,928	33.64%	1,578
28	Upper Burtuk	82.48%	Prem Singh Tamang	SDF	5,908	78.63%	Arun Kumar Rai	INC	1,345	17.9%	4,563
29	Kabi–Lungchok	85.36%	Thenlay Tshering Bhutia	SDF	4,823	64.46%	Ugen Nedup Bhutia	INC	2,659	35.54%	2,164
30	Djongu	89.79%	Sonam Gyatso Lepcha	SDF	4,756	79.97%	Norden Tshering Lepcha	INC	819	13.77%	3,937
31	Lachen–Mangan	89.48%	Tshering Wangdi Lepcha	SDF	2,719	53.3%	Anil Lachenpa	INC	1,940	38.03%	779
32	Sangha	64.75%	Phetook Tshering Bhutia	SDF	980	49.49%	Tshering Lama	INC	925	46.72%	55

== See also ==
- State Assembly elections in India, 2009
- Indian general election in Sikkim, 2009
- Assembly election results of Sikkim
