= Sikkim Pradesh Congress Committee =

- President: Gopal Chhetri
- Headquarters: NH-31A, 5th Mile Tadong Gangtok-737102, Sikkim
- Youth wing: Sikkim Youth Congress
- Women's wing: Sikkim Pradesh Mahila Congress Committee
- Ideology: Populism; Social liberalism; Democratic socialism; Social democracy; Secularism
- ECI status: A State Unit of Indian National Congress
- Alliance: Indian National Developmental Inclusive Alliance
- Seats in Rajya Sabha: 0 / 1
- Seats in Lok Sabha: 0 / 1
- Seats in Sikkim Legislative Assembly: 0 / 32

Election symbol

The Sikkim Pradesh Congress Committee (SPCC) is the Indian National Congress unit for the state of Sikkim, India. It is responsible for organizing and coordinating the party's activities and campaigns within the state, as well as selecting candidates for local, state, and national elections. Its head office is situated in Gangtok, the capital city of Sikkim.

The present President of Sikkim Pradesh is Gopal Chhetri.

== Electoral records ==
=== Sikkim Legislative Assembly election ===
Year	Total Seats	Seats Contested	Seats Won	Forfeited Deposits	% Votes Contested	Source
1985	32	32	1	5	24.15	
1989	32	31	0	16	18.68	
1994	32	31	2	17	15.59	
1999	32	31	0	28	3.78	
2004	32	28	1	6	26.13	
2009	32	32	0	4	28.31	
2009 (by-election)	1	1	0	1	9.67	
2014	32	32	0	32	1.47	
2014 (by-election)	1	1	0	1	0.30	
2017 (by-election)	1	1	0	1	1.05	
2019	32	24	0	24	1.03	
2024	32	12	0	12	0.32	

=== Lok Sabha election, Sikkim ===
Lok Sabha Elections
Year	Lok Sabha	Seats contested	Seats won	(+/-) in seats	% of votes	Vote swing	Popular vote	Outcome
1977	6th	1	1 / 1	Election Unopposed				Opposition
1980	7th	0	0 / 1	Did Not Contest				Government
1984	8th	1	0 / 1	▼1	25.81%	New entry	21,327	Government
1989	9th	1	0 / 1	Steady	21.56%	▼4.25	28,822	Opposition
1991	10th	0	0 / 1	Did Not Contest				Government
1996	11th	0	0 / 1	Did Not Contest				Opposition
1998	12th	1	0 / 1	Steady	33.11%	▲11.55	51,611	Opposition
1999	13th	1	0 / 1	Steady	4.76%	▼28.35	9,762	Opposition
2004	14th	1	0 / 1	Steady	27.43%	▲22.67	60,258	Government
2009	15th	1	0 / 1	Steady	29.59%	▲2.16	74,483	Government
2014	16th	1	0 / 1	Steady	2.33%	▼27.26	7,189	Opposition
2019	17th	1	0 / 1	Steady	1.13%	▼1.20	3,922	Opposition
2024	18th	1	0 / 1	Steady	0.58%	▼0.55	2,241	Opposition

== See also ==
- Indian National Congress
- Congress Working Committee
- All India Congress Committee
- Pradesh Congress Committee
