= 2019 Sikkim Legislative Assembly election =

Sikkim Legislative Assembly election, 2019

- 11 April 2019

32 Seats in the Sikkim Legislative Assembly 17 seats needed for a majority
- Turnout: 81.43%(▲0.46%)
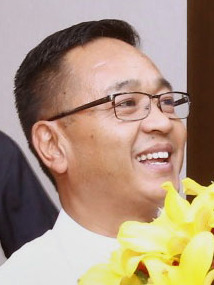

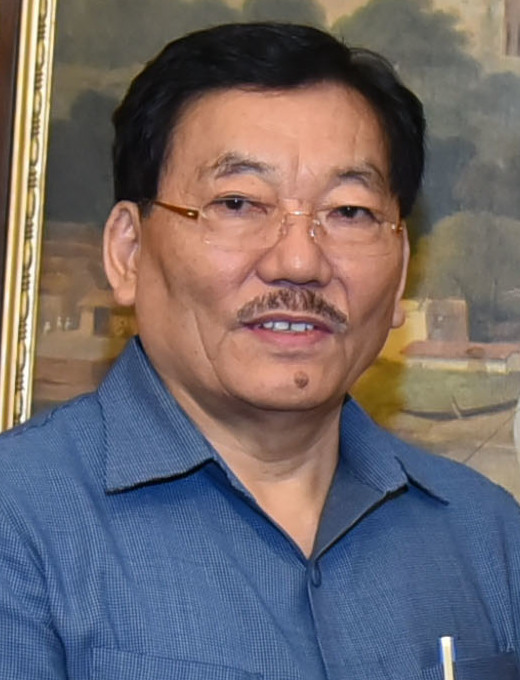
	Majority party	Minority party
Leader	Prem Singh Tamang	Pawan Kumar Chamling
Party	SKM	SDF
Alliance	NDA	-
Leader since	2014	1994
Leader's seat	Poklok-Kamrang (by- elected)	Namchi-Singhithang (won, retained); Poklok-Kamrang (won, vacated)
Last election	10	22
Seats won	17	15
Seat change	▲7	▼7
Popular vote	165,508	167,620
Percentage	47.17%	47.63%
Swing	▲6.37%	▼7.37%
- Map of the election results. The Sangha seat, elected by the monks, is shown in the circle (No. 32).
Chief Minister before election
Pawan Kumar Chamling
SDF
Elected Chief Minister
Prem Singh Tamang
SKM

Legislative Assembly elections were held in Sikkim on 11 April 2019 to elect all 32 members of the tenth Legislative Assembly. The term of the tenth Sikkim Legislative Assembly ended on 27 May 2019.

== Schedule of election ==
Poll Event	Date
Issue of Notification	Monday 18 March 2019
Last Date for filing Nominations	Monday 25 March 2019
Scrutiny of Nominations	Tuesday, 26 March 2019
Last date for withdrawal of Candidature	Thursday,28 March 2019
Date of Poll	Thursday, 11 April 2019
Counting of Votes	Thursday, 23 May 2019
Date of election being completed	Sunday, 2 June 2019
Source: Election Commission of India

== Parties contested ==
Party	Flag	Symbol	Leader	Seats contested
Sikkim Democratic Front			Pawan Kumar Chamling	32
Sikkim Krantikari Morcha			Prem Singh Tamang	32
Indian National Congress			Bharat Basnett	24
Hamro Sikkim Party			Bhaichung Bhutia	23
Sikkim Republican Party			Kharka Bahadur Rai	13
Bharatiya Janata Party			Narendra Modi	12
Sikkim Rajya Manch Party				3
Sikkim United Front				1
Jai Maha Bharat Party				1

== Results ==
Results were announced on 23 May 2019.

Party	Votes	%	Seats	+/–
Sikkim Democratic Front	167,620	47.63	15	–7
Sikkim Krantikari Morcha	165,508	47.03	17	+7
Bharatiya Janata Party	5,700	1.62	0	0
Indian National Congress	2,719	0.77	0	0
Hamro Sikkim Party	2,098	0.60	0	New
Sikkim Republican Party	1,233	0.35	0	New
Sikkim Rajya Manch	647	0.18	0	New
Sikkim United Front Party	62	0.02	0	New
Jai Maha Bharath Party	41	0.01	0	New
Independents	3,286	0.93	0	0
None of the above	3,039	0.86	–	–
Total	351,953	100.00	32	0
Valid votes	351,953	99.57		
Invalid/blank votes	1,534	0.43		
Total votes	353,487	100.00		
Registered voters/turnout	434,128	81.42		
Source: CEO Sikkim

=== Results by constituency ===
Winner, runner-up, voter turnout, and victory margin in every constituency
Assembly Constituency		Turnout	Winner				Runner Up				Margin
#k	Names	%	Candidate	Party	Votes	%	Candidate	Party	Votes	%	Margin
Gyalshing District
1	Yoksam–Tashiding	84.88	Sangay Lepcha	SKM	5,686	48.52	Dichen Wangchuk Bhutia	SDF	5,607	47.84	79
2	Yangthang	82.58	Bhim Hang Limboo	SKM	5,184	48.47	Dal Bahadur Subba	SDF	5,137	48.03	47
3	Maneybong–Dentam	85.25	Narendra Kumar Subba	SDF	7,134	55.15	Purna Hang Subba	SKM	5,630	43.52	1,504
4	Gyalshing–Barnyak	82.81	Lok Nath Sharma	SKM	5,862	57.06	Laxuman Sharma	SDF	4,048	39.4	1,814
Soreng District
5	Rinchenpong	85.38	Karma Sonam Lepcha	SDF	6,582	52.24	Phurba Tshering Bhutia	SKM	5,513	43.76	1,069
6	Daramdin	82.99	Mingma Narbu Sherpa	SKM	6,219	49.08	Pem Norbu Sherpa	SDF	5,883	46.43	336
7	Soreng–Chakung	84.29	Aditya Tamang	SKM	6,580	50.08	Sancha Raj Subba	SDF	6,372	48.49	208
8	Salghari–Zoom	81.62	Sunita Gajmer	SKM	4,400	49.27	Dhan Kumari Kami	SDF	4,307	48.23	93
Namchi District
9	Barfung	81.23	Tashi Thendup Bhutia	SDF	5,936	49.13	Lobzang Bhutia	SKM	5,839	48.32	97
10	Poklok–Kamrang	83.89	Pawan Kumar Chamling	SDF	7,731	59.09	Kharga Bahadur Rai	SKM	4,832	36.93	2,899
11	Namchi–Singhithang	79.17	Pawan Kumar Chamling	SDF	5,054	50.31	Ganesh Rai	SKM	4,677	46.56	377
12	Melli	81.69	Farwanti Tamang	SDF	6,354	50.25	Tilak Basnet	SKM	5,489	43.41	865
13	Namthang–Rateypani	82.71	Sanjit Kharel	SKM	6,848	53.59	Birjan Tamang	SDF	5,543	43.38	1,305
14	Temi–Namphing	82.73	Bedu Singh Panth	SKM	6,084	51.7	Garjaman Gurung	SDF	5,314	45.16	770
15	Rangang–Yangang	82.58	Raj Kumari Thapa	SDF	6,146	53.47	Raj Kumar Basnet	SKM	4,621	40.2	1,525
16	Tumin–Lingee	83.46	Ugyen Tshering Gyatso Bhutia	SDF	6,615	49.89	Samdup Tshering Bhutia	SKM	6,295	47.47	320
Gangtok District
17	Khamdong–Singtam	81.2	Dr. Mani Kumar Sharma	SKM	5,347	50.39	Garjaman Gurung	SDF	4,474	42.16	873
Pakyong District
18	West Pendam	77.97	Lall Bahadur Das	SKM	5,799	49.64	Gopal Baraily	SDF	4,901	41.95	898
19	Rhenock	81.88	Bishnu Kumar Sharma	SKM	8,039	56.44	Hemendra Adhikari	SDF	4,953	34.77	3,086
20	Chujachen	79.96	Krishna Bahadur Rai	SDF	7,266	51.12	Damber Kumar Pradhan	SKM	5,939	41.79	1,327
21	Gnathang–Machong	84.1	Dorjee Tshering Lepcha	SDF	6,380	62.97	Tshering Bhutia	SKM	3,460	34.15	2,920
22	Namchaybong	82.15	Em Prasad Sharma	SDF	6,141	49.52	Denis Rai	SKM	5,170	41.69	971
Gangtok District
23	Shyari	77.69	Kunga Nima Lepcha	SKM	6,638	54.31	Karma Wangdi Bhutia	SDF	5,282	43.22	1,356
24	Martam–Rumtek	81.02	Dorjee Tshering Lepcha	SDF	6,244	45.4	Sonam Venchungpa	SKM	6,171	44.87	73
25	Upper Tadong	72.92	Gay Tshering Dhungel	SDF	3,844	51.01	Anand Lama	SKM	3,428	45.49	416
26	Arithang	69.	Arun Kumar Upreti	SKM	3,150	40.02	Ashis Rai	IND politician	2,676	33.99	474
27	Gangtok	63.76	Kunga Nima Lepcha	SKM	3,838	51.68	Pintso Chopel	SDF	2,950	39.72	888
28	Upper Burtuk	77.45	Dilli Ram Thapa	SDF	6,107	51.77	Nagendra Bikram Gurung	SKM	5,350	45.35	757
Mangan District
29	Kabi–Lungchok	81.83	Karma Loday Bhutia	SKM	5,705	55.07	Ugen Nedup Bhutia	SDF	4,268	41.2	1,437
30	Djongu	88.41	Pintso Namgyal Lepcha	SDF	5,613	66.17	Chungkipu Lepcha	SKM	2,612	30.79	3,001
31	Lachen–Mangan	85.41	Samdup Lepcha	SKM	3,615	53.8	Tshering Wangdi Lepcha	SDF	3,031	45.11	584
Buddhist Monasteries
32	Sangha	72.15	Sonam Lama	SKM	1,488	62.63	Tshering Lama	SDF	858	36.11	630
