= Sikkim Democratic Front =

Political party in India

- President: Pawan Kumar Chamling
- Founded: 4 March 1993 (33 years ago)
- Headquarters: S.D.F Bhawan, Indira Bypass Gangtok, Sikkim
- ECI status: State Party
- Alliance: National Democratic Alliance (2014–2019); Federal Front (2019)
- Seats in Rajya Sabha: 0 / 245
- Seats in Lok Sabha: 0 / 543
- Seats in Sikkim Legislative Assembly: 0 / 32

Election symbol
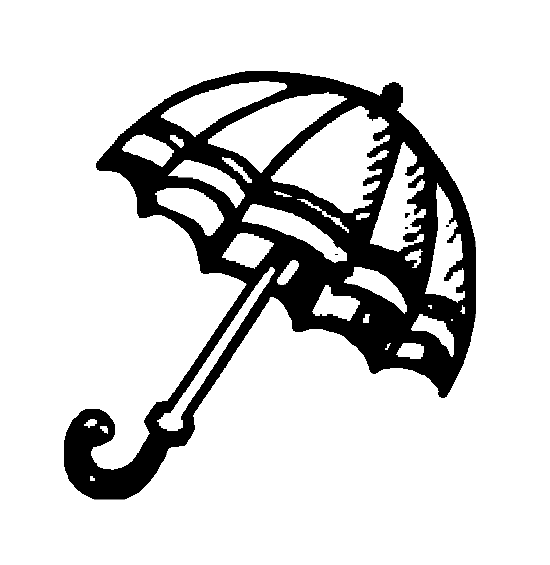

Sikkim Democratic Front (SDF) is a regional political party in the Indian state of Sikkim. It was the ruling party in Sikkim from 12 December 1994 to 23 May 2019.

== History ==
The party was founded by Pawan Kumar Chamling in 1993. It has ruled the Sikkim state from 1994 to 2019 with Pawan Kumar Chamling as the chief minister. The party consolidated its position sweeping the 1999 and 2004 state elections. It won 31 of the 32 assembly seats in the 2004 election. In the 2009 assembly election, the party made a clean sweep, winning all 32 seats. It also retained the lone Lok Sabha seat. In 2014 assembly elections, SDF won 22 seats and retained power.

In May 2016, after the BJP led NDA formed its first government in Assam, a new alliance called the North-East Democratic Alliance (NEDA) was formed with BJP leader Himanta Biswa Sarma as its convener. The Chief Ministers of the north eastern states of Sikkim, Assam, Manipur, Arunachal Pradesh and Nagaland too belong to this alliance. Thus, the Sikkim Democratic Front joined the NDA led NEDA.

Pawan Kumar Chamling resigned as CM after 2019 Sikkim Legislative Assembly election as former member Prem Singh Tamang's Sikkim Krantikari Morcha party formed the government by winning 17 seats out of 32. SDF party won the remaining 15 seats. But in August 2019, 10 MLAs quit his party to join the Bharatiya Janata Party and in the same month two other legislators joined Sikkim Krantikari Morcha. Thus making Pawan Kumar Chamling the only MLA of his party. The party won only 1 seat in the 2024 Sikkim Legislative Assembly election, with former CM Pawan Kumar Chamling losing the election from both the seats he contested. Later, its only MLA defected to Sikkim Krantikari Morcha, thus reducing its strength in the legislative assembly to zero.

== Frontal Organisation ==
- Youth Wing
- Student's Wing
- Women's Wing
- Labour Wing
- Cultivators and Organic Farmers Wing
- Ex-servicemen Wing
- Scheduled Tribe Welfare Wing
- Scheduled Caste Welfare Wing
- Drivers Wing
- Traders Wing

== List of Chief Minister ==
No.	Name	Term		Tenure
1	Pawan Kumar Chamling (MLA from Namchi-Singhithang)	12 December 1994	23 May 2019	24 years, 162 days

== Electoral records ==
Sikkim Legislative Assembly election

Year	Total Seats	Seats Contested	Seats Won	Forfeited Deposits	% Votes contested	Source
1994	32	32	19	1	42.00	
1999	32	31	24	0	52.83	
2004	32	32	31	0	71.09	
2009	32	32	32	0	67.52	
2009 (by-election)	1	1	1	0	80.77	
2014	32	32	22	0	56.74	
2014 (by-election)	1	1	0	0	43.68	
2017 (by-election)	1	1	1	0	90.15	
2019	32	32	15	0	47.63	
2019 (by-election)	3	3	0	3	15.18	
2024	32	32	1	5	27.37	

Lok Sabha election, Sikkim

Year	Total Seats	Seats Contested	Seats Won	Forfeited Deposits	% Votes contested	Source
1996	1	1	1	0	72.15	
1998	1	1	1	0	65.72	
1999	1	1	1	0	52.56	
2004	1	1	1	0	69.84	
2009	1	1	1	0	63.30	
2014	1	1	1	0	52.98	
2019	1	1	0	0	43.92	
2024	1	1	0	0	20.05	

== See also ==
- List of political parties in India
- Elections in Sikkim
