= List of Representatives of Sikkim =

The list of Representatives of Sikkim comprises all rulers and representatives of the independent Kingdom of Sikkim, the subsequent British (and later Indian) protected Sikkim, and the Indian state of Sikkim following the 1975 accession of Sikkim to India.

== Chogyals (1642–1975) ==
Sikkim was ruled by the Namgyal dynasty which ruled Sikkim as a sovereign state from 1642 to 1975. The ruler of Sikkim in the period was termed the Chogyal.

List of Chogyals
Order	Name of Chogyal	Reign	
Order	Name of Chogyal	Start	End
1	Phuntsog Namgyal	1642	1670
2	Tensung Namgyal	1670	1700
3	Chakdor Namgyal	1700	1717
4	Gyurmed Namgyal	1717	1733
5	Phuntsog Namgyal II	1733	1780
6	Tenzing Namgyal	1780	1793
7	Tsugphud Namgyal	1793	1863
8	Sidkeong Namgyal	1863	1874
9	Thutob Namgyal	1874	1914
10	Sidkeong Tulku Namgyal	1914	1914
11	Tashi Namgyal	1914	1963
12	Palden Thondup Namgyal	1963	1975

== Sikkim State Council (1953–1975) ==
The State Council was established in 1953 by the then Chogyal His Majesty Tashi Namgyal. It had 18 members, of which 12 were elected and six (including the President) appointed by the Chogyal. Of the 12 elected members, six were for the Nepali community and six for the Lepcha and the Bhutia communities. It was later increased to 14 elected + 6 appointed, then the elected seats were increased to 18 but the number of appointed members remained 6. 1973 elections saw a huge voter rigging. In 1974, the first elections with universal suffrage were held in Sikkim and hence 32 constituencies were decided with all the members elected by the people.

1st State Council (1953–1958)
	Constituency	Reservation	Party	Name
1	North-Central	Bhutia-Lepcha	Sikkim National Party	Sonam Tshering Lepcha
2	North-Central	Bhutia-Lepcha	Sikkim National Party	Martam Topden
3	North-Central	Sikkimese Nepali	Sikkim State Congress	Khus Narain Pradhan
4	Gangtok	Bhutia-Lepcha	Sikkim National Party	Chodup Lepcha
5	Gangtok	Bhutia-Lepcha	Sikkim National Party	Netuk Bhutia
6	Gangtok	Sikkimese Nepali	Sikkim State Congress	Adhiklal Pradhan
7	Namchi	Bhutia-Lepcha	Sikkim National Party	Kunzang Rapgay
8	Namchi	Sikkimese Nepali	Sikkim State Congress	Kashi Raj Pradhan
9	Namchi	Sikkimese Nepali	Sikkim State Congress	Jai Narayan Subba
10	Pemayangtse	Bhutia-Lepcha	Sikkim National Party	Sonam Wangchuk
11	Pemayangtse	Sikkimese Nepali	Sikkim State Congress	Dhan Bahadur Gurung
12	Pemayangtse	Sikkimese Nepali	Sikkim State Congress	Nahakul Pradhan
13	Appointed by Chogyal			John S. Lal
14	Appointed by Chogyal			Rai Bahadur Densapa
15	Appointed by Chogyal			Tekbir Khati
16	Appointed by Chogyal			Palda Lama
17	Appointed by Chogyal			Prem Bahadur Basnet

2nd State Council (1958–1967)(term extended due to Sino-Indian War)
	Constituency	Reservation	Party	
1	Gangtok	Bhutia-Lepcha	Sikkim National Party	Sonam Tshering Lepcha
2	Gangtok	Bhutia-Lepcha	Sikkim National Party	Kesang Wangdi
3	Gangtok	Sikkimese Nepali	Sikkim State Congress	Narendra Nar Singh
4	North-Central	Bhutia-Lepcha	Sikkim National Party	Martam Topden
5	North-Central	Bhutia-Lepcha	Sikkim National Party	Thendup Bhutia
6	North-Central	Sikkimese Nepali	Sikkim State Congress	Nahakul Pradhan
7	Namchi	Bhutia-Lepcha	Sikkim National Party	Kazi Norbu Wangdi
8	Namchi	Sikkimese Nepali	Sikkim State Congress	Sangkhaman Rai
9	Namchi	Sikkimese Nepali	Sikkim State Congress	Kashi Raj Pradhan
10	Pemayangtse	Bhutia-Lepcha	Sikkim National Party	Gaden Tashi
11	Pemayangtse	Sikkimese Nepali	Sikkim State Congress	Sher Bahadur Gurung
12	Pemayangtse	Sikkimese Nepali	Sikkim State Congress	Bhujit Mukhia
13	General	Sangha	Sikkim National Party	Lharipa Rinzing Lama
14	General	General	Independent	Chaksung Bhutia
15	Appointed by Chogyal			Rai Bahadur Densapa
16	Appointed by Chogyal			Rev. Chotuk Tsering Pazo
17	Appointed by Chogyal			Indra Prasad Subba
18	Appointed by Chogyal			Bhairap Bahadur Lamchaney,
19	Appointed by Chogyal			Atal Singh Dewan
20	Appointed by Chogyal			Prem Bahadur Basnet

3rd State Council (1967)
	Constituency	Reservation	Party	Name
1	Gangtok	Bhutia-Lepcha	Sikkim National Congress	R. Namgyal
2	Gangtok	Sikkimese Nepali	Sikkim National Congress	Chatur Singh Rai
3	East	Bhutia-Lepcha	Sikkim National Party	Netuk Bhutia
4	East	Bhutia-Lepcha	Sikkim National Party	Nima Tenzing
5	East	Sikkimese Nepali	Sikkim State Congress	Nahakul Pradhan
6	South	Bhutia-Lepcha	Sikkim National Party	Nayan Tsering Lepcha
7	South	Sikkimese Nepali	Sikkim National Congress	Garjaman Gurung
8	South	Sikkimese Nepali	Sikkim National Congress	Thakur Singh Rai
9	West	Bhutia-Lepcha	Sikkim National Congress	Ongden Lepcha
10	West	Sikkimese Nepali	Sikkim National Congress	Bhim Bahadur Gurung
11	West	Sikkimese Nepali	Sikkim National Congress	Premlall Tiwari
12	North	Bhutia-Lepcha	Sikkim National Party	Martam Topden
13	North	Bhutia-Lepcha	Sikkim National Party	Pawo Tensung Bhutia
14	North	Sikkimese Nepali	Sikkim State Congress	Jitbahadur Lama
15	General	None	Sikkim National Congress	Lendhup Dorji Khangsarpa
16	General	Sangha	Independent	Pema Lama
17	General	Tsong	Independent	Harka Dhoj Tsong
18	General	SC	Independent	Purna Bahadur Khati
19	Appointed by Chogyal			R. N. Haldipur
20	Appointed by Chogyal			M. M. Rasailly
21	Appointed by Chogyal			P. B. Basnet
22	Appointed by Chogyal			Sonam Wangyal
23	Appointed by Chogyal			I. B. Gurung
24	Appointed by Chogyal			Sangey Tempo

4th State Council (1970–1973)
	Constituency	Reservation	Party	Name
1	East	Bhutia-Lepcha	Sikkim National Party	Martam Topden
2	East	Bhutia-Lepcha	Sikkim National Party	Nima Tenzing
3	East	Sikkimese Nepali	Sikkim State Congress	Nahakul Pradhan
4	South	Bhutia-Lepcha	Sikkim National Party	Khunzang Dorji
5	South	Sikkimese Nepali	Sikkim State Congress	Kalu Rai
6	South	Sikkimese Nepali	Sikkim National Congress	Bhagiman Rai
7	West	Bhutia-Lepcha	Sikkim National Congress	Thendup Tsering Bhutia
8	West	Sikkimese Nepali	Sikkim National Congress	Khagra Bahadur Khatiwara
9	West	Sikkimese Nepali	Sikkim State Congress	Bhim Bahadur Chettri
10	North	Bhutia-Lepcha	Sikkim National Party	Nim Tsering Lepcha
11	North	Bhutia-Lepcha	Sikkim National Party	Netuk Tsering
12	North	Sikkimese Nepali	Sikkim State Congress	Badrilal Pradhan
13	Gangtok	Bhutia-Lepcha	Sikkim National Party	Ashok Tsering Bhutia
14	Gangtok	Sikkimese Nepali	Sikkim National Party	Harka Bahadur Basnett
15	General	Sangha	Independent	Rinzing Chewang Lama
16	General	SC	Independent	Nandalal Rasaily
17	General	Tsong	Sikkim National Congress	Padam Singh Tsong
18		None	Sikkim National Congress	Lendhup Dorji Khangsarpa
19	Appointed by Chogyal			Y. Dorji Dahdul
20	Appointed by Chogyal			M. M. Rasilly
21	Appointed by Chogyal			R. S. Prasad
22	Appointed by Chogyal			D. B. Chettri
23	Appointed by Chogyal			Pinto Tashi
24	Appointed by Chogyal			J. D. Pulger

5th State Council (1973)
	Constituency	Reservation	Party	Name
1	West	Sikkimese Nepali	Sikkim National Congress	Chattra Bahadur Chettri
2	West	Sikkimese Nepali	Sikkim National Congress	Chandra Bahadur Rai
3	West	Bhutia-Lepcha	Sikkim National Party	Thendup Tsering Bhutia
4	South	Sikkimese Nepali	Sikkim National Congress	Durga Prasad Rai
5	South	Sikkimese Nepali	Sikkim Janata Congress	Bhuwani Prasad Kharel
6	South	Bhutia-Lepcha	Sikkim National Party	Khunzang Dorji
7	Gangtok	Sikkimese Nepali	Sikkim National Party	Ashok Tsering Bhutia
8	Gangtok	Bhutia-Lepcha	Sikkim National Party	Harka Bahadur Basnett
9	East	Sikkimese Nepali	Sikkim National Party	Nima Tenzing
10	East	Sikkimese Nepali	Sikkim National Party	Kalzing Gyatso
11	East	Bhutia-Lepcha	Sikkim Janata Congress	Bhuwani Prasad Dahal
12	North	Sikkimese Nepali	Sikkim National Party	Netuk Lama
13	North	Sikkimese Nepali	Sikkim National Party	Ugyen Palzor Kazi
14	North	Bhutia-Lepcha	Sikkim National Party	Kul Bahadur Chettri
15	General	None	Sikkim National Congress	Kazi Lhendup Dorjee
16	General	Tsong	Sikkim National Congress	Krishna Bahadur Limbu
17	General	SC	Independent	Purna Bahadur Khati
18	General	Sangha	Independent	Peyching Lama
19	Appointed by Chogyal			Traten Sherba Gyaltsen
20	Appointed by Chogyal			Madan Mohan Rasaily
21	Appointed by Chogyal			Chhoutuk Tsering Pazo
22	Appointed by Chogyal			Dhan Bahadur Chettri
23	Appointed by Chogyal			Kali Prasad Rai
24	Appointed by Chogyal			Atang Lepcha

6th State Council (1974–1979) (Same as 1st Sikkim Legislative Assembly)
	Constituency	Reserved for	Party	Name
1	Yoksam	Bhutia-Lepcha	Sikkim National Congress	Degay Bhutia
2	Tashiding	Bhutia-Lepcha	Sikkim National Congress	Kazi Lhendup Dorjee
3	Geyzing	Nepalis	Sikkim National Congress	Kumari Hemlata Chettri
4	Dentam	Nepalis	Sikkim National Congress	Narbahadur Khatiwada
5	Barmiok	Nepalis	Sikkim National Congress	Nanda Kumar Subedi
6	Rinchenpong	Bhutia-Lepcha	Sikkim National Congress	Nayen Tshering Lepcha
7	Chakung	Nepalis	Sikkim National Congress	B. B. Gurung
8	Soreong	Nepalis	Sikkim National Congress	Chatur Singh Rai
9	Daramdin	Nepalis	Sikkim National Congress	Krishna Bahadur Limboo
10	Jorethang-Nayabazar	Nepalis	Sikkim National Congress	Krishna Chandra Pradhan
11	Ralang	Bhutia-Lepcha	Sikkim National Congress	Passang Tshering Bhutia
12	Wak	Bhutia-Lepcha	Sikkim National Congress	Adar Singh Lepcha
13	Damthang	Nepalis	Sikkim National Congress	Ratna Bijay Rai
14	Melli	Nepalis	Sikkim National Congress	Nanda Bahadur Rai
15	Rateypani West	Nepalis	Sikkim National Congress	Pendam Bhuwani Prasad Kharel
16	Temi–Tarku	Nepalis	Sikkim National Congress	Badri Nath Pradhan
17	Central Pendam-East Pendam	Nepalis	Sikkim National Congress	Kehar Singh Karki
18	Rhenock	Nepalis	Sikkim National Congress	Bhawani Prasad Dahal
19	Regu	Nepalis	Sikkim National Congress	Mohan Gurung
20	Pathing	Bhutia-Lepcha	Sikkim National Congress	Sonpom Lepcha
21	Loosing-Pachekhani	Nepalis	Sikkim National Congress	R. C. Poudyal
22	Khamdong	SC	Sikkim National Congress	Kusu Das
23	Djongu	Bhutia-Lepcha	Sikkim National Congress	Loden Tsering Lepcha
24	Lachen-Mangshila	Bhutia-Lepcha	Sikkim National Congress	Tasa Tengay Lepcha
25	Kabi-Tingda	Bhutia-Lepcha	Sikkim National Party	Kalzang Gyatso Bhutia
26	Rakdong-Tentek	Bhutia-Lepcha	Sikkim National Congress	Rinzing Tongden Lepcha
27	Martam	Bhutia-Lepcha	Sikkim National Congress	Shepochung Bhutia
28	Rumtek	Bhutia-Lepcha	Sikkim National Congress	Phigu Tshering Bhutia
29	Assam-Lingjey	Bhutia-Lepcha	Sikkim National Congress	Dugo Bhutia
30	Ranka	Bhutia-Lepcha	Sikkim National Congress	Nim Tshering Lepcha
31	Gangtok	Bhutia-Lepcha	Sikkim National Congress	Dorjee Tshering Bhutia
32	Sangha	Sangha	Sikkim National Congress	Karma Gonpo Lama

== Indian annexation ==
When India annexed Sikkim in 1975, Sikkim was converted from a sovereign territory to an Indian State.The Chogyals lost recognition and the position of Head of the state of Sikkim was transferred from the Chogyals to the Governor of Sikkim. State Council was renamed Sikkim Legislative Assembly, the powers of the Assembly were changed to that of a state legislative assembly in India.

=== Governors of Sikkim ===
The Governor of Sikkim is the head of the state of Sikkim appointed by the President of India.

List of Governors of Sikkim
#	Name (born – died)	Tenure		Appointed by (President)
#	Name (born – died)	From	To	Appointed by (President)
1	B. B. Lal ICS (Retired) (1917–2008)	16 May 1975	9 January 1981	Fakhruddin Ali Ahmed
2	Homi J. H. Taleyarkhan (1912–1998)	10 January 1981	17 June 1984	Neelam Sanjiva Reddy
3	Kona Prabhakara Rao (1916–1990)	18 June 1984	30 May 1985 (Note: Transferred as the Governor of Maharashtra)	Zail Singh
Acting	Bhishma Narain Singh (1933–2018); Governor of Assam (Additional charge)	31 May 1985	20 November 1985	Zail Singh
4	T. V. Rajeswar IPS (Retired) (1926–2018)	21 November 1985	1 March 1989 (Note: Transferred as the Governor of West Bengal)	Zail Singh
5	S. K. Bhatnagar IAS (Retired) (1930–2001)	2 March 1989	7 February 1990	Ramaswamy Venkataraman
6	Admiral Radhakrishna Hariram Tahiliani (Retired) PVSM AVSM (1930–2015)	8 February 1990	20 September 1994	Ramaswamy Venkataraman
7	P. Shiv Shankar (1929–2017)	21 September 1994	11 November 1995 (Note: Transferred as the Governor of Kerala)	Shankar Dayal Sharma
Acting	K. V. Raghunatha Reddy (1924–2002); Governor of West Bengal	12 November 1995	9 February 1996	Shankar Dayal Sharma
8	Chaudhary Randhir Singh (1924–2023)	10 February 1996	17 May 2001	Shankar Dayal Sharma
9	Kidar Nath Sahani (1926–2012)	18 May 2001	25 October 2002 (Note: Transferred as the Governor of Goa)	K. R. Narayanan
10	V. Rama Rao (1935–2016)	26 October 2002	12 July 2006	A. P. J. Abdul Kalam
Acting	R. S. Gavai (1929–2015); Governor of Bihar	13 July 2006	12 August 2006	A. P. J. Abdul Kalam
(10)	V. Rama Rao (1935–2016)	13 August 2006	25 October 2007	A. P. J. Abdul Kalam
11	Sudarshan Agarwal (1931–2019)	25 October 2007	8 July 2008	Pratibha Patil
12	Balmiki Prasad Singh (born 1942)	9 July 2008	7 April 2010	Pratibha Patil
Acting	M. K. Narayanan IPS (Retired) (born 1934)	7 April 2010	27 April 2010	Pratibha Patil
(12)	Balmiki Prasad Singh (born 1942)	27 April 2010	30 June 2013	Pratibha Patil
13	Shriniwas Dadasaheb Patil IAS (Retired) (born 1941)	20 July 2013	26 August 2018	Pranab Mukherjee
14	Ganga Prasad (born 1939)	26 August 2018	15 February 2023	Ram Nath Kovind
15	Lakshman Prasad Acharya (born 1954)	16 February 2023	30 July 2024 (Note: Transferred as the Governor of Assam)	Droupadi Murmu
16	Om Prakash Mathur (born 1952)	31 July 2024	Incumbent	Droupadi Murmu

=== Sikkim Legislative Assembly ===
Eslabilished in 1975, the last State Council of Sikkim (elected in 1974) was renamed to the Sikkim Legislative Assembly and served its complete 5 year term. 2nd Sikkim Assembly had its elections in 1979 and with the Governor of Sikkim, serves as the unicameral legislature of Sikkim.

2nd Sikkim Assembly (1979–1984)
#	Constituency	MLA	Party
1	Yoksam	Sanchaman Limboo	SJP
2	Tashiding	Dawgyal Pentso Bhutia	SJP
3	Geyzing	Indra Bahadur Limboo	SJP
4	Dentam	Padam Lall Gurung	SC(R)
5	Barmiok	Til Bahadur Limbu	SJP
6	Rinchenpong	Katuk Bhutia	SJP
7	Chakung	Bhim Bahadur Gurung	SC(R)
8	Soreong	Nar Bahadur Bhandari	SJP
9	Daramdin	Padam Bahadur Gurung	SJP
10	Jorthang–Nayabazar	Bhim Bahadur Gurung	SC(R)
11	Ralong	Chamla Tshering	SC(R)
12	Wak	Garjaman Gurung	SPC
13	Damthang	Pradeep Yanzone	SC(R)
14	Melli	Mohan Prasad Sharma	SJP
15	Rateypani–West Pendam	Bir Bahadur Lohar	SC(R)
16	Temi–Tarku	Nar Bahadur Khatiwada	SPC
17	Central Pendam–East Pendam	Bhuwani Prasad Kharel	SC(R)
18	Rhenock	Kharananda Upreti	SC(R)
19	Regu	Tulshi Sharma	SJP
20	Pathing	Ram Lepcha	SC(R)
21	Loosing Pachekhani	Jagat Bandhu Pradhan	SC(R)
22	Khamdong	Dal Bahadur Damai	SPC
23	Djongu	Athup Lepcha	SJP
24	Lachen Mangshila	Tenzing Dadul Bhutia	SJP
25	Kabi Tingda	Sonam Tshering	SJP
26	Rakdong Tentek	Dugo Bhutia	SPC
27	Martam	Samten Tshering	SJP
28	Rumtek	Dadul Bhutia	SJP
29	Assam–Lingjey	Sherab Palden	SJP
30	Ranka	Dorjee Tshering Bhutia	SC(R)
31	Gangtok	Lal Bahadur Basnet	SJP
32	Sangha	Lhachen Ganchen Rimpuchhi	IND

3rd Sikkim Assembly (1985–1989)
#	Constituency	MLA	Party
1	Yoksam	Sancha Man Subba	SSP
2	Tashiding	Ugen Pritso Bhutia	SSP
3	Geyzing	Man Bahadur Dahal	SSP
4	Dentam	Padam Lall Gurung	SSP
5	Barmiok	Birbal Subba	SSP
6	Rinchenpong	Ongdi Bhutia	SSP
7	Chakung	Tara Man Rai	SSP
8	Soreong	Nar Bahadur Bhandari	SSP
9	Daramdin	Padam Bahadur Gurung	SSP
10	Jorthang–Nayabazar	Bhim Raj Rai	SSP
11	Ralong	Sonam Gyatso	SSP
12	Wak	Bedu Singh Chettri	SSP
13	Damthang	Pawan Kumar Chamling	SSP
14	Melli	Dilliram Basnet	SSP
15	Rateypani–West Pendam	Chandra Kumar Mohora	SSP
16	Temi–Tarku	Indra Bahadur Rai	SSP
17	Central Pendam–East Pendam	Sukumar Pradhan	SSP
18	Rhenock	Kharananda Upreti	SSP
19	Regu	Tulshi Sharma	SSP
20	Pathing	Ram Lepcha	SSP
21	Loosing Pachekhani	Bhakta Bahadur Khulal	SSP
22	Khamdong	Birkha Man Ramudamu	SSP
23	Djongu	Sonam Chyoda Lepcha	SSP
24	Lachen Mangshila	Thokchok Bhutia	SSP
25	Kabi Tingda	Kalzang Gyatso	INC
26	Rakdong Tentek	Phuchung Bhutia	SSP
27	Martam	Chamla Tshering Bhutia	SSP
28	Rumtek	Ongay Tob Shutia	SSP
29	Assam–Lingjey	Sonam Dupden Lepcha	SSP
30	Ranka	Dorjee Tshering Bhutia	SSP
31	Gangtok	Balchand Sarda	IND
32	Sangha	Namkha Gyaltsen	SSP

4th Sikkim Assembly (1989–1994)
#	Constituency	MLA	Party
1	Yoksam	Sanchaman Subba	SSP
2	Tashiding	Ugen Pritso Bhutia	SSP
3	Geyzing	Man Bahadur Dahal	SSP
4	Dentam	Padam Lall Gurung	SSP
5	Barmiok	Bir Bal Subba	SSP
6	Rinchenpong	Chong Lamu Bhutia	SSP
7	Chakung	Tara Man Rai	SSP
8	Soreong	Nar Bahadur Bhandari	SSP
9	Daramdin	Padam Bahadur Gurung	SSP
10	Jorthang–Nayabazar	Bhim Raj Rai	SSP
11	Ralong	Sonam Gyatso Kaleon	SSP
12	Wak	Bedu Singh Panth	SSP
13	Damthang	Pawan Kumar Chamling	SSP
14	Melli	Dilliram Basnet	SSP
15	Rateypani–West Pendam	Chandra Kumar Mohora	SSP
16	Temi–Tarku	I. B. Rai	SSP
17	Central Pendam–East Pendam	Sukumar Pradhan	SSP
18	Rhenock	Kharananda Upreti	SSP
19	Regu	Rajendra Prasad Uprety	SSP
20	Pathing	Ram Lepcha	SSP
21	Loosing Pachekhani	Rup Raj Rai	SSP
22	Khamdong	Birkha Man Ramudamu	SSP
23	Djongu	Sonam Chyoda Lepcha	SSP
24	Lachen Mangshila	Tasa Tengey Lepcha	SSP
25	Kabi Tingda	Hangu Tshering Bhutia	SSP
26	Rakdong Tentek	Phuchung Bhutia	SSP
27	Martam	Chamla Tshering Bhutia	SSP
28	Rumtek	O. T. Bhutia	SSP
29	Assam–Lingjey	Sonam Dupden Lepcha	SSP
30	Ranka	Dorjee Tshering Bhutia	SSP
31	Gangtok	Manita Pradhan	SSP
32	Sangha	Nanjha Gyaltsen	SSP

5th Sikkim Assembly (1999–2004)
#	Constituency	MLA	Party
1	Yoksam	Ashok Kumar Subba	IND
2	Tashiding	Thutop Bhutia	SSP
3	Geyzing	Dal Bahadur Gurung	SDF
4	Dentam	Chakra Bahadur Subba	SDF
5	Barmiok	Tulshi Prasad Pradhan	SDF
6	Rinchenpong	Phur Tshering Lepcha	SDF
7	Chakung	Prem Singh Tamang	SDF
8	Soreong	Nar Bahadur Bhandari	SSP
9	Daramdin	Ran Bahadur Subba	SDF
10	Jorthang–Nayabazar	Bhoj Raj Rai	SDF
11	Ralong	Dorjee Dazom Bhutia	SDF
12	Wak	Kedar Nath Rai	SDF
13	Damthang	Pawan Kumar Chamling	SDF
14	Melli	Girish Chandra Rai	SDF
15	Rateypani–West Pendam	Aita Singh Kami	SDF
16	Temi–Tarku	Garjaman Gurung	SDF
17	Central Pendam–East Pendam	Dilli Prasad Kharel	SDF
18	Rhenock	Kharananda Upreti	SSP
19	Regu	Karna Bahadur Chamling	SDF
20	Pathing	Ram Lepcha	SSP
21	Loosing Pachekhani	Dil Bahadur Thapa	SDF
22	Khamdong	Gopal Lamichaney	SDF
23	Djongu	Sonam Chyoda Lepcha	INC
24	Lachen Mangshila	Hishey Lachungpa	SDF
25	Kabi Tingda	Thenlay Tshering Bhutia	SDF
26	Rakdong Tentek	Mingma Tshering Sherpa	SSP
27	Martam	Dorjee Tshering Lepcha	SSP
28	Rumtek	Menlom Lepcha	SSP
29	Assam–Lingjey	Tseten Tashi	SSP
30	Ranka	Rinzing Ongmu	SSP
31	Gangtok	Narendra Kumar Pradhan	SSP
32	Sangha	Namkha Gyaltsen Lama	INC

6th Sikkim Assembly (1999–2004)
#	Constituency	MLA	Party
1	Yoksam	Kalawati Subba	SDF
2	Tashiding	Thutop Bhutia	SDF
3	Geyzing	Sher Bahadur Subedi	SDF
4	Dentam	Narendra Kumar Subba	SDF
5	Barmiok	Tulshi Prasad Pradhan	SDF
6	Rinchenpong	Ongden Tshering Lepcha	SDF
7	Chakung	Prem Singh Tamang	SDF
8	Soreong	Ram Bahadur Subba	SDF
9	Daramdin	Ran Bahadur Subba	SDF
10	Jorthang–Nayabazar	Bhoj Raj Rai	SDF
11	Ralong	Dorjee Dazom Bhutia	SDF
12	Wak	Kedar Nath Rai	SDF
13	Damthang	Pawan Kumar Chamling	SDF
14	Melli	Girish Chandra Rai	SDF
15	Rateypani–West Pendam	Chandra Kumar Mohora	SDF
16	Temi–Tarku	Garjaman Gurung	SDF
17	Central Pendam–East Pendam	Sang Dorjee Tamang	SSP
18	Rhenock	Nar Bahadur Bhandari	SSP
19	Regu	Karna Bahadur Chamling	SDF
20	Pathing	Sonam Dorjee	SSP
21	Loosing Pachekhani	Jai Kumar Bhandari	SSP
22	Khamdong	Gopal Lamichaney	SDF
23	Djongu	Sonam Gyatso Lepcha	SSP
24	Lachen Mangshila	Hishey Lachungpa	SDF
25	Kabi Tingda	Thenlay Tshering Bhutia	SDF
26	Rakdong Tentek	Mingma Tshering Sherpa	SSP
27	Martam	Dorjee Tshering Lepcha	SDF
28	Rumtek	Karma Tempo Namgyal Gyaltsen	SDF
29	Assam–Lingjey	Tseten Tashi Bhutia	SDF
30	Ranka	Tseten Dorjee Lepcha	SDF
31	Gangtok	Narendra Kumar Pradhan	SSP
32	Sangha	Palden Lama	IND

7th Sikkim Assembly (2004–2009)
#	Constituency	MLA	Party
1	Yoksam	Kalawati Subba	SDF
2	Tashiding	Dawa Narbu Takarpa	SDF
3	Geyzing	Sher Bahadur Subedi	SDF
4	Dentam	Deepak Kumar Gurung	SDF
5	Barmiok	Narendra Kumar Subba	SDF
6	Rinchenpong	Dawcho Lepcha	SDF
7	Chakung	Prem Singh Tamang	SDF
8	Soreong	Ram Bahadur Subba	SDF
9	Daramdin	Ran Bahadur Subba	SDF
10	Jorthang–Nayabazar	Kedar Nath Rai	SDF
11	Ralong	Dorjee Dazom Bhutia	SDF
12	Wak	Chandra Bahadur Karki	SDF
13	Damthang	Pawan Kumar Chamling	SDF
14	Melli	Girish Chandra Rai	SDF
15	Rateypani–West Pendam	Aita Singh Baraily (Kami)	SDF
16	Temi–Tarku	Garjaman Gurung	SDF
17	Central Pendam–East Pendam	Somnath Poudyal	SDF
18	Rhenock	Bhim Prasad Dhungel	SDF
19	Regu	Karna Bahadur Chamling	SDF
20	Pathing	Mingma Tshering Sherpa	SDF
21	Loosing Pachekhani	Manita Thapa	SDF
22	Khamdong	Birkha Man Ramudamu	SDF
23	Djongu	Sonam Gyatso Lepcha	SDF
24	Lachen Mangshila	Hishey Lachungpa	SDF
25	Kabi Tingda	Thenlay Tshering Bhutia	SDF
26	Rakdong Tentek	Norzong Lepcha	SDF
27	Martam	Dorjee Tshering Lepcha	SDF
28	Rumtek	Menlom Lepcha	SDF
29	Assam–Lingjey	Kunga Zangpo Bhutia	SDF
30	Ranka	Nimthit Lepcha	SDF
31	Gangtok	Narendra Kumar Pradhan	SDF
32	Sangha	Tshering Lama	INC

8th Sikkim Assembly (2009–2014)
#	Constituency	MLA	Party
1	Yoksam–Tashiding	86.94%	SDF
2	Yangthang	85.99%	SDF
3	Maneybong–Dentam	86.75%	SDF
4	Gyalshing–Barnyak	84.32%	SDF
5	Rinchenpong	86.96%	SDF
6	Daramdin	84.83%	SDF
7	Soreng–Chakung	84.62%	SDF
8	Salghari–Zoom	84.62%	SDF
9	Barfung	85.78%	SDF
10	Poklok–Kamrang	86.32%	SDF
11	Namchi–Singhithang	76.84%	SDF
12	Melli	83.83%	SDF
13	Namthang–Rateypani	82.7%	SDF
14	Temi–Namphing	84.96%	SDF
15	Rangang–Yangang	85.44%	SDF
16	Tumin–Lingee	84.9%	SDF
17	Khamdong–Singtam	84.24%	SDF
18	West Pendam	82.94%	SDF
19	Rhenock	84.97%	SDF
20	Chujachen	83.92%	SDF
21	Gnathang–Machong	85.78%	SDF
22	Namchaybong	86.49%	SDF
23	Shyari	81.51%	SDF
24	Martam–Rumtek	85.29%	SDF
25	Upper Tadong	78.07%	SDF
26	Arithang	73.65%	SDF
27	Gangtok	70.38%	SDF
28	Upper Burtuk	82.48%	SDF
29	Kabi–Lungchok	85.36%	SDF
30	Djongu	89.79%	SDF
31	Lachen–Mangan	89.48%	SDF
32	Sangha	64.75%	SDF

9th Sikkim Assembly (2014–2019)
#	Constituency	MLA	Party
1	Yoksam–Tashiding	Sonam Dadul Bhutia	SDF
2	Yangthang	Chandra Maya Limboo (Subba)	SDF
3	Maneybong–Dentam	Narendra Kumar Subba	SDF
4	Gyalshing–Barnyak	Sher Bahadur Subedi	SDF
5	Rinchenpong	Karma Sonam Lepcha	SDF
6	Daramdin	Danorbu Sherpa	SDF
7	Soreng–Chakung	Ram Bahadur Subba	SDF
8	Salghari–Zoom	Arjun Kumar Ghatani	SDF
9	Barfung	Dorjee Dazom Bhutia	SDF
10	Poklok–Kamrang	Kedar Nath Rai	SDF
11	Namchi–Singhithang	Pawan Kumar Chamling	SDF
12	Melli	Tulshi Devi Rai	SDF
13	Namthang–Rateypani	Tilu Gurung	SDF
14	Temi–Namphing	Garjaman Gurung	SDF
15	Rangang–Yangang	Pawan Kumar Chamling	SDF
16	Tumin–Lingee	Ugyen Tshering Gyatso Bhutia	SDF
17	Khamdong–Singtam	Somnath Poudyal	SDF
18	West Pendam	Gopal Baraily	SKM
19	Rhenock	Hemendra Adhikari	SKM
20	Chujachen	Bikram Pradhan	SDF
21	Gnathang–Machong	Dorjee Tshering Lepcha	SDF
22	Namchaybong	Bek Bahadur Rai	SDF
23	Shyari	Kunga Nima Lepcha	SKM
24	Martam–Rumtek	Mechung Bhutia	SKM
25	Upper Tadong	Timothy William Basnett	SKM
26	Arithang	Shyam Pradhan	SKM
27	Gangtok	Pintso Chopel	SKM
28	Upper Burtuk	Prem Singh Tamang	SKM
29	Kabi–Lungchok	Ugen Nedup Bhutia	SKM
30	Djongu	Sonam Gyatso Lepcha	SDF
31	Lachen–Mangan	Tshering Wangdi Lepcha	SDF
32	Sangha	Sonam Lama	SKM

10th Sikkim Assembly (2019–2024)
#	Constituency	MLA	Party	
#	Constituency	MLA	Contested in Election	Defected after elections (if any)
1	Yoksam-Tashiding	Sangay Lepcha	SKM	
2	Yangthang	Bhim Hang Limboo	SKM	
3	Maneybong Dentam	Narendra Kumar Subba	SDF	BJP
4	Gyalshing-Barnyak	Lok Nath Sharma	SKM	
5	Rinchenpong	Karma Sonam Lepcha	SDF	BJP
6	Daramdin	Mingma Narbu Sherpa	SKM	
7	Soreng-Chakung	Aditya Tamang	SKM	
8	Salghari-Zoom (SC)	Sunita Gajmer	SKM	
9	Barfung (BL)	Tashi Thendup Bhutia	SDF	BJP
10	Poklok-Kamrang	Pawan Kumar Chamling (Note: Resigned)	SDF	
10	Poklok-Kamrang	Prem Singh Tamang (Note: Elected in by-election)	SKM	
11	Namchi-Singhithang	Pawan Kumar Chamling	SDF	
12	Melli	Farwanti Tamang	SDF	BJP
13	Namthang-Rateypani	Sanjit Kharel	SKM	
14	Temi-Namphing	Bedu Singh Panth	SKM	
15	Rangang-Yangang	Raj Kumari Thapa	SDF	BJP
16	Tumin Lingee (BL)	Ugyen Tshering Gyatso Bhutia	SDF	BJP
17	Khamdong-Singtam	Mani Kumar Sharma	SKM	
18	West Pendam (SC)	Lall Bahadur Das	SKM	
19	Rhenock	Bishnu Kumar Sharma	SKM	
20	Chujachen	Krishna Bahadur Rai	SDF	BJP
21	Gnathang-Machong (BL)	Dorjee Tshering Lepcha	SDF	BJP
22	Namchaybong	Em Prasad Sharma	SDF	SKM
23	Shyari	Kunga Nima Lepcha	SKM	
24	Martam-Rumtek	Dorjee Tshering Lepcha	SDF	
24	Martam-Rumtek	Sonam Venchungpa	BJP	
25	Upper Tadong	Gay Tshering Dhungel	SDF	SKM
26	Arithang	Arun Kumar Upreti	SKM	
27	Gangtok	Kunga Nima Lepcha	SKM	
27	Gangtok	Yong Tshering Lepcha	BJP	
28	Upper Burtuk	Dilli Ram Thapa	SDF	BJP
29	Kabi Lungchok	Karma Loday Bhutia	SKM	
30	Djongu (BL)	Pintso Namgyal Lepcha	SDF	BJP
31	Lachen-Mangan	Samdup Lepcha	SKM	
32	Sangha	Sonam Lama	SKM	

11th Sikkim Assembly (2024–present) term ends in June 2029
#	Constituency	MLA	Party
1	Yoksam–Tashiding (BL)	Tshering Thendup Bhutia	SKM
2	Yangthang	Bhim Hang Limboo	SKM
3	Maneybong–Dentam	Sudesh Kumar Subba	SKM
4	Gyalshing–Barnyak	Lok Nath Sharma	SKM
5	Rinchenpong (BL)	Erung Tenzing Lepcha	SKM
6	Daramdin (BL)	Mingma Narbu Sherpa	SKM
7	Soreng–Chakung	Prem Singh Tamang	SKM
7	Soreng–Chakung	Aditya Tamang	SKM
8	Salghari–Zoom (SC)	Madan Cintury	SKM
9	Barfung (BL)	Rikshal Dorjee Bhutia	SKM
10	Poklok–Kamrang	Bhoj Raj Rai	SKM
11	Namchi–Singhithang	Krishna Kumari Rai	SKM
11	Namchi–Singhithang	Satish Chandra Rai	SKM
12	Melli	Nar Bahadur Pradhan	SKM
13	Namthang–Rateypani	Sanjit Kharel	SKM
14	Temi–Namphing	Bedu Singh Panth	SKM
15	Rangang–Yangang	Raj Kumari Thapa	SKM
16	Tumin–Lingee (BL)	Samdup Tshering Bhutia	SKM
17	Khamdong–Singtam	Nar Bahadur Dahal	SKM
18	West Pendam (SC)	Lall Bahadur Das	SKM
19	Rhenock	Prem Singh Tamang	SKM
20	Chujachen	Puran Kumar Gurung	SKM
21	Gnathang–Machong (BL)	Pamin Lepcha	SKM
22	Namchaybong	Raju Basnet	SKM
23	Shyari (BL)	Tenzing Norbu Lamtha	SDF (later defected to SKM)
24	Martam–Rumtek (BL)	Sonam Venchungpa	SKM
25	Upper Tadong	G.T. Dhungel	SKM
26	Arithang	Arun Kumar Upreti	SKM
27	Gangtok (BL)	Delay Namgyal Barfungpa	SKM
28	Upper Burtuk	Kala Rai	SKM
29	Kabi–Lungchok (BL)	Thenlay Tshering Bhutia	SKM
30	Djongu (BL)	Pintso Namgyal Lepcha	SKM
31	Lachen–Mangan (BL)	Samdup Lepcha	SKM
32	Sangha	Sonam Lama	SKM

=== Parliament of India ===
The Parliament of India is a bicameral parliament with Rajya Sabha (upper house) and Lok Sabha (lower house) both having 1 seat each for Sikkim.

==== Rajya Sabha members from Sikkim ====
#	Name of Member	Party	Term		Notes
#	Name of Member	Party	Start	End	Notes
	Vacant from 16 May 1975 (the day Sikkim became a part of India) to 19 October 1975				
1	Leonard Soloman Saring	INC	20 October 1975	19 October 1981	
1	Leonard Soloman Saring	INC	20 October 1981	19 October 1987	
2	Khamsum Namgyal Pulger	SSP	20 October 1987	1 March 1988	Resigned in mid term
	Vacant from 1–29 March 1988				
3	Karma Topden	INC	30 March 1988	19 October 1993	Served the remainder of the term
Vacant from 20 October 1993 to 23 February 1994 (Elections delayed by ECI)
3	Karma Topden	INC	24 February 1993	23 February 2000	
4	K. G. Bhutia	SDF	24 February 2000	12 August 2000	Died in office
Vacant from 12 August 2000 to 21 September 2000
5	Palden Tsering Gyamtso	SDF	22 September 2000	23 February 2006	Served the remainder of the term
6	O. T. Lepcha	SDF	24 February 2006	23 February 2012	
7	Hishey Lachungpa	SDF	24 February 2012	23 February 2018	
7	Hishey Lachungpa	SDF	24 February 2018	23 February 2024	
8	Dorjee Tshering Lepcha	BJP	24 February 2024–present		Term ends on or before February 23, 2030

==== Lok Sabha members from Sikkim ====
Sikkim Lok Sabha constituency
Lok Sabha	Year of Elections	Name of Member	Party	Notes	Ref.
6th	1977	Chhatra Bahadur Chhetri	INC	Lok Sabha dissolved earlier	
7th	1980	Pahal Man Subba	SJP		
8th	1984	Nar Bahadur Bhandari	IND	Resigned	
8th	1985	Dil Kumari Bhandari	SSP	elected in a by-election, and served remaining term	
9th	1989	Nandu Thapa	SSP		
10th	1991	Dil Kumari Bhandari	SSP	Lok Sabha dissolved earlier	
11th	1996	Bhim Prasad Dahal	SDF		
12th	1998	Bhim Prasad Dahal	SDF	Lok Sabha dissolved earlier	
13th	1999	Bhim Prasad Dahal	SDF	Lok Sabha dissolved earlier	
14th	2004	Nakul Das Rai	SDF		
15th	2009	Prem Das Rai	SDF		
16th	2014	Prem Das Rai	SDF		
17th	2019	Indra Hang Subba	SKM	Incumbent	
18th	2024	Indra Hang Subba	SKM	Incumbent	
