= Pathing Assembly constituency =

Constituency of the Sikkim legislative assembly in India

Coordinates: 27.29°N 88.42°E

Pathing
- Former constituency for the Sikkim Legislative Assembly

Constituency details
- Country: India
- Region: Northeast India
- State: Sikkim
- Established: 1979
- Abolished: 2008
- Total electors: 8,866

Pathing Assembly constituency was an assembly constituency in the Indian state of Sikkim.

== Members of the Legislative Assembly ==
Election	Member	Party
1979	Ram Lepcha	Sikkim Congress
1985	Ram Lepcha	Sikkim Sangram Parishad
1989	Ram Lepcha	Sikkim Sangram Parishad
1994	Ram Lepcha	Sikkim Sangram Parishad
1999	Sonam Dorjee	Sikkim Sangram Parishad
2004	Mingma Tshering Sherpa	Sikkim Democratic Front

== Election results ==
=== Assembly election 2004 ===
2004 Sikkim Legislative Assembly election: Pathing
Party	Candidate	Votes	%	±%
SDF	Mingma Tshering Sherpa	4,930	67.41%	▲26.73
INC	Tseten Tashi Bhutia	2,275	31.11%	▲24.42
SHRP	Karsang Sherpa	108	1.48%	New
Margin of victory		2,655	36.31%	▲24.36
Turnout		7,313	82.48%	▼0.25
Registered electors		8,866		▲2.81
SDF gain from SSP		Swing	▲14.79	

=== Assembly election 1999 ===
1999 Sikkim Legislative Assembly election: Pathing
Party	Candidate	Votes	%	±%
SSP	Sonam Dorjee	3,755	52.63%	▲9.23
SDF	Ram Lepcha	2,903	40.69%	▲10.13
INC	Penzo Delay Namgyal	477	6.69%	▼10.35
Margin of victory		852	11.94%	▼0.91
Turnout		7,135	84.07%	▲1.36
Registered electors		8,624		▲16.04
SSP hold		Swing	▲9.23	

=== Assembly election 1994 ===
1994 Sikkim Legislative Assembly election: Pathing
Party	Candidate	Votes	%	±%
SSP	Ram Lepcha	2,625	43.40%	▼22.51
SDF	Sonam Dorjee	1,848	30.56%	New
INC	Sangey Dorjee Bhutia	1,030	17.03%	▼10.76
Independent	Pema Namgyal Kazi	337	5.57%	New
RSP	Palden Bhutia	110	1.82%	New
Independent	Phurba Tempa Sherpa	67	1.11%	New
Margin of victory		777	12.85%	▼25.27
Turnout		6,048	83.58%	▲4.67
Registered electors		7,432		
SSP hold		Swing	▼22.51	

=== Assembly election 1989 ===
1989 Sikkim Legislative Assembly election: Pathing
Party	Candidate	Votes	%	±%
SSP	Ram Lepcha	3,225	65.91%	▼6.81
INC	Sangey Dorjee	1,360	27.79%	▲2.42
RIS	Palden Bhutia	106	2.17%	New
Margin of victory		1,865	38.12%	▼9.23
Turnout		4,893	73.54%	▲10.12
Registered electors		6,379		
SSP hold		Swing		

=== Assembly election 1985 ===
1985 Sikkim Legislative Assembly election: Pathing
Party	Candidate	Votes	%	±%
SSP	Ram Lepcha	2,407	72.72%	New
INC	Sangay Dorjee Bhutia	840	25.38%	New
Independent	Kesang Dorjee Bhutia	33	1.00%	New
SPC	Sangay Bhutia	30	0.91%	▼7.82
Margin of victory		1,567	47.34%	▲39.26
Turnout		3,310	67.57%	▲4.95
Registered electors		4,971		▲31.72
SSP gain from SC (R)		Swing	▲42.07	

=== Assembly election 1979 ===
1979 Sikkim Legislative Assembly election: Pathing
Party	Candidate	Votes	%	±%
SC (R)	Ram Lepcha	713	30.65%	New
SJP	Chitim Bhutia	525	22.57%	New
JP	Sangey Dorjee Bhutia	358	15.39%	New
SPC	Sangay Bhutia	203	8.73%	New
CPI(M)	Jimba Bhutia	185	7.95%	New
Independent	Cholek Dorjee Bhutia	163	7.01%	New
Independent	O. T. Lepcha	85	3.65%	New
Independent	Rinzing Kazi	73	3.14%	New
Independent	Sonpin Lucksom	21	0.90%	New
Margin of victory		188	8.08%	
Turnout		2,326	66.96%	
Registered electors		3,774		
SC (R) win (new seat)				
