= Rhenock Assembly constituency =

Legislative Assembly constituency in Sikkim, India

Coordinates: 27.149°N 88.344°E

Rhenock
- Constituency No. 19 for the Sikkim Legislative Assembly

Constituency details
- Country: India
- Region: Northeast India
- State: Sikkim
- District: Pakyong
- Lok Sabha constituency: Sikkim
- Established: 1979
- Reservation: None

Member of Legislative Assembly
- 11th Sikkim Legislative Assembly
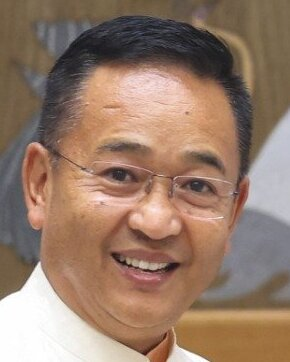
- Incumbent Prem Singh Tamang; Chief Minister of Sikkim
- Party: SKM
- Alliance: NDA
- Elected year: 2024

Rhenock is one of the 32 Legislative Assembly constituencies of Sikkim state in India. It is part of Pakyong district. Chief minister of state represents this constituency.

It is composed of the following Revenue Blocks: Sajong of Gangtok Sub-Division; Pachak, Kamarey Bhasmey, East Pendam, Dikling, Amba, Tshalumthang, Pacheykhani(Dikling), Losing, Pacheykhani(Losing), Taza, Tarpin and Rhenock in Pakyong Sub-Division.

== Members of the Legislative Assembly ==
Election	Member	Party
1979	Kharananda Upreti	Sikkim Congress
1985	Kharananda Upreti	Sikkim Sangram Parishad
1989	Kharananda Upreti	Sikkim Sangram Parishad
1994	Kharananda Upreti	Sikkim Sangram Parishad
1999	Nar Bahadur Bhandari	Sikkim Sangram Parishad
2004	Bhim Prasad Dhungel	Sikkim Democratic Front
2009	Bhim Prasad Dhungel	Sikkim Democratic Front
2014	Hemendra Adhikari	Sikkim Krantikari Morcha
2019	Bishnu Kumar Sharma	Sikkim Krantikari Morcha
2024	Prem Singh Tamang	Sikkim Krantikari Morcha

== Election results ==
=== Assembly election 2024 ===
2024 Sikkim Legislative Assembly election: Rhenock
Party	Candidate	Votes	%	±%
SKM	Prem Singh Tamang	10,094	64.54%	▲8.10
SDF	Somnath Poudyal	3,050	19.50%	▼15.27
Citizen Action Party – Sikkim	Tikaram Sharma	1171	7.49	New
BJP	Prem Chhetri	852	5.45%	▲0.99
SRP	Laxmi Sharma	170	1.09%	▲0.23
NOTA	None of the Above	162	1.04%	▲0.04
INC	Kapil Prasad Sapkota	140	0.90%	▼0.45
Margin of victory		7,044	21.67%	▲14.22
Turnout		15,639		
Registered electors				
SKM hold		Swing	▲8.10	

=== Assembly election 2019 ===
2019 Sikkim Legislative Assembly election: Rhenock
Party	Candidate	Votes	%	±%
SKM	Bishnu Kumar Sharma	8,039	56.44%	▲6.39
SDF	Hemendra Adhikari	4,953	34.77%	▼7.83
BJP	Bharat Kumar Sharma	649	4.56%	New
INC	Deo Kr Pradhan	192	1.35%	▲0.27
NOTA	None of the Above	142	1.00%	▼0.09
SRP	Chakrapani Sharma	122	0.86%	New
HSP	Biraj Adhikari	85	0.60%	New
Margin of victory		3,086	21.67%	▲14.22
Turnout		14,244	81.88%	▼2.59
Registered electors		17,396		▲14.64
SKM hold		Swing	▲6.39	

=== Assembly election 2014 ===
2014 Sikkim Legislative Assembly election: Rhenock
Party	Candidate	Votes	%	±%
SKM	Hemendra Adhikari	6,415	50.05%	New
SDF	Bhim Prasad Dhungel	5,461	42.60%	▼11.12
Independent	Tilak Kumar Pradhan	474	3.70%	New
NOTA	None of the Above	139	1.08%	New
INC	Padam Bahadur Chettri	138	1.08%	▼38.83
Independent	Om Prakash Bhandari	99	0.77%	New
AITC	Nawraj Chettri	92	0.72%	New
Margin of victory		954	7.44%	▼6.37
Turnout		12,818	84.47%	▼0.50
Registered electors		15,175		▲23.44
SKM gain from SDF		Swing	▼3.67	

=== Assembly election 2009 ===
2009 Sikkim Legislative Assembly election: Rhenock
Party	Candidate	Votes	%	±%
SDF	Bhim Prasad Dhungel	5,611	53.72%	▼21.73
INC	Kedar Nath Sharma	4,168	39.90%	▲17.92
Independent	Biraj Adhikari	226	2.16%	New
SHRP	Rudra Khatiwara	130	1.24%	New
Sikkim Gorkha Party	Bedan Kumar Chettri	119	1.14%	New
CPI(M)	Udaya Chandra Ghimiray	101	0.97%	New
Independent	Atri Ram Chandra Poudyal	90	0.86%	New
Margin of victory		1,443	13.82%	▼39.65
Turnout		10,445	84.97%	▲4.00
Registered electors		12,293		
SDF hold		Swing	▼21.73	

=== Assembly election 2004 ===
2004 Sikkim Legislative Assembly election: Rhenock
Party	Candidate	Votes	%	±%
SDF	Bhim Prasad Dhungel	4,647	75.45%	▲32.59
INC	Kharananda Upreti	1,354	21.98%	▲21.37
BJP	Shanti Chhetri	158	2.57%	New
Margin of victory		3,293	53.47%	▲40.35
Turnout		6,159	80.96%	▲1.67
Registered electors		7,607		
SDF gain from SSP		Swing		

=== Assembly election 1999 ===
1999 Sikkim Legislative Assembly election: Rhenock
Party	Candidate	Votes	%	±%
SSP	Nar Bahadur Bhandari	3,364	55.97%	▲9.45
SDF	Bedu Singh Panth	2,576	42.86%	▲10.10
INC	Padam Dhakal	37	0.62%	▼13.52
Independent	Santosh Kumar Pradhan	33	0.55%	New
Margin of victory		788	13.11%	▼0.65
Turnout		6,010	81.04%	▼2.48
Registered electors		7,579		▲23.44
SSP hold		Swing	▲9.45	

=== Assembly election 1994 ===
1994 Sikkim Legislative Assembly election: Rhenock
Party	Candidate	Votes	%	±%
SSP	Kharananda Upreti	2,336	46.52%	▼13.74
SDF	Biraj Adhikari	1,645	32.76%	New
INC	Bhawani Prasad Dahal	710	14.14%	▼19.24
RSP	Santosh Kumar Pradhan	297	5.92%	New
Independent	Arjun Kumar Chettri	33	0.66%	New
Margin of victory		691	13.76%	▼13.13
Turnout		5,021	83.79%	▲6.70
Registered electors		6,140		▲21.06
SSP hold		Swing	▼13.74	

=== Assembly election 1989 ===
1989 Sikkim Legislative Assembly election: Rhenock
Party	Candidate	Votes	%	±%
SSP	Kharananda Upreti	2,295	60.27%	▲0.53
INC	Kiran Chettri	1,271	33.38%	▲9.96
RIS	Bal Krishna Uprety	226	5.93%	New
Margin of victory		1,024	26.89%	▼9.44
Turnout		3,808	78.55%	▲8.92
Registered electors		5,072		▲10.81
SSP hold		Swing		

=== Assembly election 1985 ===
1985 Sikkim Legislative Assembly election: Rhenock
Party	Candidate	Votes	%	±%
SSP	K. N. Upretti	1,809	59.74%	New
INC	B. P. Dahal	709	23.41%	▲7.31
Independent	K. N. Adhikari	231	7.63%	New
Independent	Udai Chandra Vasistha	163	5.38%	New
JP	Kamala Subba	90	2.97%	▼13.40
CPI	B. B. Mishra	19	0.63%	New
Margin of victory		1,100	36.33%	▲29.65
Turnout		3,028	67.58%	▼1.86
Registered electors		4,577		▲42.41
SSP gain from SC (R)		Swing	▲36.69	

=== Assembly election 1979 ===
1979 Sikkim Legislative Assembly election: Rhenock
Party	Candidate	Votes	%	±%
SC (R)	Kharananda Upreti	504	23.06%	New
JP	Bhuwani Prasad Dahal	358	16.38%	New
INC	Sunder Kumar Newar	352	16.10%	New
SJP	Krishna Bahadur	313	14.32%	New
SPC	Kewal Prasad Sharma	303	13.86%	New
Independent	Prem Bahadur Chhetri	212	9.70%	New
CPI(M)	Ganga Ram Rai	56	2.56%	New
Independent	Nanda Lall Dulal	48	2.20%	New
Independent	Rudra Mani Basnet	24	1.10%	New
Independent	Laxman Bhujel	16	0.73%	New
Margin of victory		146	6.68%	
Turnout		2,186	70.54%	
Registered electors		3,214		
SC (R) win (new seat)				

== See also ==
- List of constituencies of the Sikkim Legislative Assembly
- Pakyong district
