= Yoksam Assembly constituency =

Constituency of the Sikkim legislative assembly in India

Coordinates: 27.37°N 88.22°E

Yoksam
- Former constituency for the Sikkim Legislative Assembly

Constituency details
- Country: India
- Region: Northeast India
- State: Sikkim
- Established: 1979
- Abolished: 2008
- Total electors: 8,035

Yoksam Assembly constituency was an assembly constituency in the Indian state of Sikkim.

== Members of the Legislative Assembly ==
Election	Member	Party
1979	Sanchaman Limboo	Sikkim Janata Parishad
1985	Sanchaman Limboo	Sikkim Sangram Parishad
1989	Sanchaman Limboo	Sikkim Sangram Parishad
1994	Ashok Kumar Subba	Independent politician
1999	Kalawati Subba	Sikkim Democratic Front
2004	Kalawati Subba	Sikkim Democratic Front

== Election results ==
=== Assembly election 2004 ===
2004 Sikkim Legislative Assembly election: Yoksam
Party	Candidate	Votes	%	±%
SDF	Kalawati Subba	3,947	60.90%	▲8.10
INC	Mangal Bir Subba	2,427	37.45%	▲18.93
SHRP	Akar Dhoj Limbu	107	1.65%	New
Margin of victory		1,520	23.45%	▼0.85
Turnout		6,481	80.66%	▲0.64
Registered electors		8,035		▲4.79
SDF hold		Swing	▲8.10	

=== Assembly election 1999 ===
1999 Sikkim Legislative Assembly election: Yoksam
Party	Candidate	Votes	%	±%
SDF	Kalawati Subba	3,240	52.80%	▲34.23
SSP	Mangalbir Subba	1,749	28.50%	▲25.86
INC	Sanchaman Subba	1,136	18.51%	▼19.55
Margin of victory		1,491	24.30%	▲21.65
Turnout		6,136	81.81%	▲0.23
Registered electors		7,668		▲11.65
SDF gain from Independent		Swing	▲12.09	

=== Assembly election 1994 ===
1994 Sikkim Legislative Assembly election: Yoksam
Party	Candidate	Votes	%	±%
Independent	Ashok Kumar Subba	2,231	40.71%	New
INC	Sanchaman Subba	2,086	38.07%	▲4.93
SDF	Kalawati Subba	1,018	18.58%	New
SSP	Bharna Singh Subba	145	2.65%	▼53.49
Margin of victory		145	2.65%	▼20.35
Turnout		5,480	82.89%	▲15.25
Registered electors		6,868		
Independent gain from SSP		Swing	▼15.42	

=== Assembly election 1989 ===
1989 Sikkim Legislative Assembly election: Yoksam
Party	Candidate	Votes	%	±%
SSP	Sanchaman Subba	2,609	56.13%	▲6.76
INC	Ashok Kumar Subba	1,540	33.13%	▲15.57
Denzong Peoples Chogpi	Perthiraj Subba	124	2.67%	New
RIS	Dhan Prasad Subba	56	1.20%	New
Margin of victory		1,069	23.00%	▼8.81
Turnout		4,648	60.11%	▲6.39
Registered electors		7,202		
SSP hold		Swing	▲6.76	

=== Assembly election 1985 ===
1985 Sikkim Legislative Assembly election: Yoksam
Party	Candidate	Votes	%	±%
SSP	Sanchaman Subba	1,535	49.37%	New
INC	Shrijetha Subba	546	17.56%	New
JP	Ashok Kumar Subba	426	13.70%	▲0.66
Independent	Sonam Paljor Bhutia	296	9.52%	New
Independent	Til Bahadur Gurung	141	4.54%	New
Independent	Pirthi Ram Subba	134	4.31%	New
Independent	Mangal Limboo	18	0.58%	New
Margin of victory		989	31.81%	▲23.51
Turnout		3,109	59.62%	▼5.57
Registered electors		5,347		▲42.85
SSP gain from SJP		Swing	▲17.76	

=== Assembly election 1979 ===
1979 Sikkim Legislative Assembly election: Yoksam
Party	Candidate	Votes	%	±%
SJP	Sanchaman Limboo	754	31.61%	New
Independent	Ashok Kumar Subba	556	23.31%	New
SPC	Mohan Kumar Gurung	468	19.62%	New
JP	Ram Bahadur Limboo	311	13.04%	New
Independent	Chewang Dorjee Bhutia	153	6.42%	New
SC (R)	Mangal Limboo	143	6.00%	New
Margin of victory		198	8.30%	
Turnout		2,385	68.98%	
Registered electors		3,743		
SJP win (new seat)				
