= Central Pendam–East Pendam Assembly constituency =

Constituency of the Sikkim legislative assembly in India

Coordinates: 27.21°N 88.58°E

Central Pendam–East Pendam
- Former constituency for the Sikkim Legislative Assembly

Constituency details
- Country: India
- Region: Northeast India
- State: Sikkim
- Established: 1979
- Abolished: 2008
- Total electors: 11,966

Central Pendam–East Pendam Assembly constituency was an assembly constituency in the Indian state of Sikkim.

== Members of the Legislative Assembly ==
Election	Member	Party
1979	Bhuwani Prasad Kharel	Sikkim Congress
1985	Sukumar Pradhan	Sikkim Sangram Parishad
1989	Sukumar Pradhan	Sikkim Sangram Parishad
1994	Dilli Prasad Kharel	Sikkim Democratic Front
1999	Sang Dorjee Tamang	Sikkim Sangram Parishad
2004	Somnath Poudyal	Sikkim Democratic Front

== Election results ==
=== Assembly election 2004 ===
2004 Sikkim Legislative Assembly election: Central Pendam–East Pendam
Party	Candidate	Votes	%	±%
SDF	Somnath Poudyal	5,620	59.11%	▲11.05
INC	Nar Bahadur Bhandari	2,165	22.77%	▲21.64
Independent	Garjaman Rai	1,565	16.46%	New
SHRP	Amrit Narayan Giri	157	1.65%	New
Margin of victory		3,455	36.34%	▲33.61
Turnout		9,507	79.45%	▼0.09
Registered electors		11,966		▲5.69
SDF gain from SSP		Swing	▲8.31	

=== Assembly election 1999 ===
1999 Sikkim Legislative Assembly election: Central Pendam–East Pendam
Party	Candidate	Votes	%	±%
SSP	Sang Dorjee Tamang	4,575	50.80%	▲17.35
SDF	Dilli Prasad Kharel	4,329	48.07%	▲12.21
INC	Reeta Karki	102	1.13%	▼9.95
Margin of victory		246	2.73%	▲0.33
Turnout		9,006	81.00%	▲0.70
Registered electors		11,322		▲18.02
SSP gain from SDF		Swing	▲14.95	

=== Assembly election 1994 ===
1994 Sikkim Legislative Assembly election: Central Pendam–East Pendam
Party	Candidate	Votes	%	±%
SDF	Dilli Prasad Kharel	2,712	35.85%	New
SSP	Sang Dorjee Tamang	2,530	33.45%	▼21.44
Independent	Kundan Mull Sarda	1,047	13.84%	New
INC	Puspak Ram Subba	838	11.08%	▲4.18
RSP	Yoga Nidhi Bhandari	234	3.09%	New
BJP	Mitra Lall Dhungel	91	1.20%	New
CPI(M)	Duk Nath Nepal	75	0.99%	New
Margin of victory		182	2.41%	▼21.00
Turnout		7,564	82.04%	▲1.12
Registered electors		9,593		
SDF gain from SSP		Swing	▼19.03	

=== Assembly election 1989 ===
1989 Sikkim Legislative Assembly election: Central Pendam–East Pendam
Party	Candidate	Votes	%	±%
SSP	Sukumar Pradhan	3,168	54.89%	▼8.56
RIS	Yoga Nidhi Bhandari	1,817	31.48%	New
INC	Madan Kumar Chetri	398	6.90%	▼25.64
Margin of victory		1,351	23.41%	▼7.51
Turnout		5,772	72.49%	▲19.16
Registered electors		7,426		
SSP hold		Swing		

=== Assembly election 1985 ===
1985 Sikkim Legislative Assembly election: Central Pendam–East Pendam
Party	Candidate	Votes	%	±%
SSP	Sukumar Pradhan	2,742	63.44%	New
INC	B. Khrel	1,406	32.53%	▲30.05
Independent	Lok Narayan Pradhan	92	2.13%	New
Independent	D. B. Subba	49	1.13%	New
SPC	Pratap Singh Giri	26	0.60%	▼3.12
Margin of victory		1,336	30.91%	▲14.82
Turnout		4,322	59.49%	▲0.18
Registered electors		7,379		▲21.45
SSP gain from SC (R)		Swing	▲25.51	

=== Assembly election 1979 ===
1979 Sikkim Legislative Assembly election: Central Pendam–East Pendam
Party	Candidate	Votes	%	±%
SC (R)	Bhuwani Prasad Kharel	1,346	37.94%	New
SJP	Toga Nidhi Bhandari	775	21.84%	New
Independent	Kundan Mull Sarda	658	18.55%	New
Independent	Ramesh Kumar Trivedi	240	6.76%	New
JP	Dilli Prasad Dhungel Sharma	147	4.14%	New
SPC	Hari Prasad Chhetri	132	3.72%	New
INC	Kahar Singh Karki	88	2.48%	New
Independent	Dhan Bahadur Sawa	61	1.72%	New
Independent	Anirudh Sharma	55	1.55%	New
Independent	Ruth Karthak Lepchani	46	1.30%	New
Margin of victory		571	16.09%	
Turnout		3,548	61.21%	
Registered electors		6,076		
SC (R) win (new seat)				
