= Assam–Lingjey Assembly constituency =

Constituency of the Sikkim legislative assembly in India

Coordinates: 27.28°N 88.65°E

Assam–Lingjey
- Former constituency for the Sikkim Legislative Assembly

Constituency details
- Country: India
- Region: Northeast India
- State: Sikkim
- Established: 1979
- Abolished: 2008
- Total electors: 9,052

Assam–Lingjey Assembly constituency was an assembly constituency in the Indian state of Sikkim.

== Members of the Legislative Assembly ==
Election	Member	Party
1979	Sherab Palden	Sikkim Janata Parishad
1985	Sonam Dupden Lepcha	Sikkim Sangram Parishad
1989	Sonam Dupden Lepcha	Sikkim Sangram Parishad
1994	Tseten Tashi	Sikkim Sangram Parishad
1999	Tseten Tashi Bhutia	Sikkim Democratic Front
2004	Kunga Zangpo Bhutia	Sikkim Democratic Front

== Election results ==
=== Assembly election 2004 ===
2004 Sikkim Legislative Assembly election: Assam–Lingjey
Party	Candidate	Votes	%	±%
SDF	Kunga Zangpo Bhutia	4,641	64.77%	▲19.46
INC	Kunga Nima Lepcha	2,415	33.71%	▲32.37
SHRP	Lall Bahadur Lepcha	109	1.52%	New
Margin of victory		2,226	31.07%	▲29.52
Turnout		7,165	79.15%	▼2.42
Registered electors		9,052		▲13.39
SDF hold		Swing	▲19.46	

=== Assembly election 1999 ===
1999 Sikkim Legislative Assembly election: Assam–Lingjey
Party	Candidate	Votes	%	±%
SDF	Tseten Tashi Bhutia	2,951	45.32%	▲17.38
SSP	Kunga Zangpo Bhutia	2,850	43.77%	▲12.09
Independent	Sonam Dupden Lepcha	624	9.58%	New
INC	Major Tshering Gyatso Kaleon (Retd.)	87	1.34%	▼4.36
Margin of victory		101	1.55%	▼2.19
Turnout		6,512	83.39%	▼1.35
Registered electors		7,983		▲33.23
SDF gain from SSP		Swing	▲13.64	

=== Assembly election 1994 ===
1994 Sikkim Legislative Assembly election: Assam–Lingjey
Party	Candidate	Votes	%	±%
SSP	Tseten Tashi	1,574	31.68%	▼28.23
SDF	Namgey Bhutia	1,388	27.93%	New
Independent	Kunga Zangpo Bhutia	810	16.30%	New
Independent	Sherap Palden	583	11.73%	New
INC	Major T. Gyatso	283	5.70%	▼24.37
Independent	Sonam Dupden Lepcha	261	5.25%	New
Independent	Azing Lepcha	70	1.41%	New
Margin of victory		186	3.74%	▼26.09
Turnout		4,969	84.76%	▲2.41
Registered electors		5,992		
SSP hold		Swing	▼28.23	

=== Assembly election 1989 ===
1989 Sikkim Legislative Assembly election: Assam–Lingjey
Party	Candidate	Votes	%	±%
SSP	Sonam Dupden Lepcha	2,359	59.90%	▲4.03
INC	Sherab Palden	1,184	30.07%	▼4.27
RIS	Sonam Tshering Bhutia	279	7.08%	New
Margin of victory		1,175	29.84%	▲8.30
Turnout		3,938	78.14%	▲14.24
Registered electors		4,891		
SSP hold		Swing		

=== Assembly election 1985 ===
1985 Sikkim Legislative Assembly election: Assam–Lingjey
Party	Candidate	Votes	%	±%
SSP	Sonam Dupden Lepcha	1,341	55.88%	New
INC	Sherab Palden	824	34.33%	New
Independent	Phurba Wangdi	172	7.17%	New
Independent	Dawa Thrudu	39	1.63%	New
JP	Gompa Namgyal Kazi	20	0.83%	▼4.92
Margin of victory		517	21.54%	▼19.20
Turnout		2,400	67.16%	▲9.90
Registered electors		3,621		▲16.32
SSP gain from SJP		Swing	▼7.94	

=== Assembly election 1979 ===
1979 Sikkim Legislative Assembly election: Assam–Lingjey
Party	Candidate	Votes	%	±%
SJP	Sherab Palden	1,120	63.82%	New
SC (R)	Phuchung Tshering	405	23.08%	New
SPC	Tshering Dedup	129	7.35%	New
JP	Norchen Lucksom	101	5.75%	New
Margin of victory		715	40.74%	
Turnout		1,755	58.53%	
Registered electors		3,113		
SJP win (new seat)				
