= Soreong Assembly constituency =

Constituency of the Sikkim legislative assembly in India

Soreong
- Former constituency for the Sikkim Legislative Assembly

Constituency details
- Country: India
- Region: Northeast India
- State: Sikkim
- Established: 1979
- Abolished: 2008
- Total electors: 9,419

Soreong Assembly constituency was an assembly constituency in the Indian state of Sikkim.

== Members of the Legislative Assembly ==
Election	Member	Party
1979	Nar Bahadur Bhandari	Sikkim Janata Parishad
1985	Nar Bahadur Bhandari	Sikkim Sangram Parishad
1989	Nar Bahadur Bhandari	Sikkim Sangram Parishad
1994	Nar Bahadur Bhandari	Sikkim Sangram Parishad
1999	Ram Bahadur Subba	Sikkim Democratic Front
2004	Ram Bahadur Subba	Sikkim Democratic Front

== Election results ==
=== Assembly election 2004 ===
2004 Sikkim Legislative Assembly election: Soreong
Party	Candidate	Votes	%	±%
SDF	Ram Bahadur Subba	5,553	72.65%	▲22.84
INC	Ashok Kumar Subba	1,871	24.48%	▲23.14
SHRP	Akar Dhoj Limbu	220	2.88%	New
Margin of victory		3,682	48.17%	▲47.22
Turnout		7,644	81.16%	▼0.37
Registered electors		9,419		▲10.67
SDF hold		Swing	▲22.84	

=== Assembly election 1999 ===
1999 Sikkim Legislative Assembly election: Soreong
Party	Candidate	Votes	%	±%
SDF	Ram Bahadur Subba	3,456	49.81%	▲4.35
SSP	Nar Bahadur Bhandari	3,390	48.85%	▼2.98
INC	Iman Singh Limbu	93	1.34%	New
Margin of victory		66	0.95%	▼5.43
Turnout		6,939	83.15%	▲0.05
Registered electors		8,511		▲9.23
SDF gain from SSP		Swing	▼2.03	

=== Assembly election 1994 ===
1994 Sikkim Legislative Assembly election: Soreong
Party	Candidate	Votes	%	±%
SSP	Nar Bahadur Bhandari	3,291	51.83%	▼39.70
SDF	Man Bahadur Subba	2,886	45.46%	New
Independent	Ashok Kumar Subba	156	2.46%	New
Margin of victory		405	6.38%	▼77.38
Turnout		6,349	83.18%	▲11.49
Registered electors		7,792		
SSP hold		Swing		

=== Assembly election 1989 ===
1989 Sikkim Legislative Assembly election: Soreong
Party	Candidate	Votes	%	±%
SSP	Nar Bahadur Bhandari	4,712	91.53%	▲11.05
INC	Pahal Man Subba	400	7.77%	▼9.42
RIS	Mandodra Sharma	36	0.70%	New
Margin of victory		4,312	83.76%	▲20.47
Turnout		5,148	71.52%	▲4.44
Registered electors		7,355		
SSP hold		Swing		

=== Assembly election 1985 ===
1985 Sikkim Legislative Assembly election: Soreong
Party	Candidate	Votes	%	±%
SSP	Nar Bahadur Bhandari	2,964	80.48%	New
INC	Durga Lama Pradhan	633	17.19%	New
Independent	Maina Lall Rai	39	1.06%	New
Independent	Jit Bahadur Tamang	35	0.95%	New
Margin of victory		2,331	63.29%	▲7.41
Turnout		3,683	66.70%	▲6.09
Registered electors		5,618		▲28.06
SSP gain from SJP		Swing	▲10.22	

=== Assembly election 1979 ===
1979 Sikkim Legislative Assembly election: Soreong
Party	Candidate	Votes	%	±%
SJP	Nar Bahadur Bhandari	1,833	70.26%	New
SC (R)	Kuldip Gurung	375	14.37%	New
Independent	Ful Maya Limbuni	140	5.37%	New
SPC	Bharta Singh	94	3.60%	New
JP	Pensum Targain	92	3.53%	New
Independent	Chndra Bahadur Tamang	57	2.18%	New
Independent	Tara Limbu	18	0.69%	New
Margin of victory		1,458	55.88%	
Turnout		2,609	62.00%	
Registered electors		4,387		
SJP win (new seat)				
