= Khamdong Assembly constituency =

Constituency of the Sikkim legislative assembly in India

Khamdong
- Former constituency for the Sikkim Legislative Assembly

Constituency details
- Country: India
- Region: Northeast India
- State: Sikkim
- Established: 1979
- Abolished: 2008
- Total electors: 10,516

Khamdong Assembly constituency was an assembly constituency in the Indian state of Sikkim.

== Members of the Legislative Assembly ==
Election	Member	Party
1979	Dal Bahadur Damai	Sikkim Prajatantra Congress
1985	Birkha Man Ramudamu	Sikkim Sangram Parishad
1989	Birkha Man Ramudamu	Sikkim Sangram Parishad
1994	Gopal Lamichaney	Sikkim Democratic Front
1999	Gopal Lamichaney	Sikkim Democratic Front
2004	Birkha Man Ramudamu	Sikkim Democratic Front

== Election results ==
=== Assembly election 2004 ===
2004 Sikkim Legislative Assembly election: Khamdong
Party	Candidate	Votes	%	±%
SDF	Birkha Man Ramudamu	6,160	74.59%	▲14.66
INC	Santosh Kumar Bardewa	1,929	23.36%	▲22.56
SHRP	Dil Kumari Darnal	170	2.06%	New
Margin of victory		4,231	51.23%	▲30.58
Turnout		8,259	78.54%	▼3.30
Registered electors		10,516		▲14.43
SDF hold		Swing	▲14.66	

=== Assembly election 1999 ===
1999 Sikkim Legislative Assembly election: Khamdong
Party	Candidate	Votes	%	±%
SDF	Gopal Lamichaney	4,507	59.93%	▲7.72
SSP	Lall Bahadur Das	2,954	39.28%	▲4.62
INC	Jitman Darjee	60	0.80%	▼7.23
Margin of victory		1,553	20.65%	▲3.10
Turnout		7,521	83.62%	▲2.40
Registered electors		9,190		▲16.92
SDF hold		Swing	▲7.72	

=== Assembly election 1994 ===
1994 Sikkim Legislative Assembly election: Khamdong
Party	Candidate	Votes	%	±%
SDF	Gopal Lamichaney	3,260	52.21%	New
SSP	Ganju Thatal	2,164	34.66%	▼31.88
INC	Birkha Man Ramudamu	501	8.02%	▲2.57
RSP	Dal Bahadur Thatal	238	3.81%	New
Independent	Bhim Sing Sunar	46	0.74%	New
Margin of victory		1,096	17.55%	▼29.54
Turnout		6,244	81.82%	▲8.38
Registered electors		7,860		
SDF gain from SSP		Swing	▼14.32	

=== Assembly election 1989 ===
1989 Sikkim Legislative Assembly election: Khamdong
Party	Candidate	Votes	%	±%
SSP	Birkha Man Ramudamu	3,330	66.53%	▼14.23
RIS	Ganga Darjee	973	19.44%	New
INC	Purna Bahadur Lamichaney	273	5.45%	▼11.39
Independent	Man Bahadur Bagdas	49	0.98%	New
Independent	Milan Kumar Trikhatri	48	0.96%	New
Margin of victory		2,357	47.09%	▼16.83
Turnout		5,005	66.35%	▲6.00
Registered electors		7,043		
SSP hold		Swing	▼14.23	

=== Assembly election 1985 ===
1985 Sikkim Legislative Assembly election: Khamdong
Party	Candidate	Votes	%	±%
SSP	Birkha Man Ramudamu	2,834	80.76%	New
INC	Purna Bahadur	591	16.84%	▲13.33
Independent	Dal Bahadur Thatal	44	1.25%	New
SPC	Kushu Das Darjee	24	0.68%	▼35.27
Margin of victory		2,243	63.92%	▲56.80
Turnout		3,509	66.22%	▼8.94
Registered electors		5,393		▲63.23
SSP gain from SPC		Swing	▲44.81	

=== Assembly election 1979 ===
1979 Sikkim Legislative Assembly election: Khamdong
Party	Candidate	Votes	%	±%
SPC	Dal Bahadur Damai	879	35.95%	New
SJP	Tilochan	705	28.83%	New
SC (R)	Man Bahadur Dorjee	696	28.47%	New
INC	Loya Prasad Mohra	86	3.52%	New
Independent	Janga Bahadur Khati	62	2.54%	New
Sikkim Scheduled Caste League	Sukman Dorjee	17	0.70%	New
Margin of victory		174	7.12%	
Turnout		2,445	79.69%	
Registered electors		3,304		
SPC win (new seat)				
