= Ranka Assembly constituency =

Constituency of the Sikkim legislative assembly in India

Ranka
- Former constituency for the Sikkim Legislative Assembly

Constituency details
- Country: India
- Region: Northeast India
- State: Sikkim
- Established: 1979
- Abolished: 2008
- Total electors: 11,258

Ranka Assembly constituency was an assembly constituency in the Indian state of Sikkim.

== Members of the Legislative Assembly ==
Election	Member	Party
1979	Dorjee Tshering Bhutia	Sikkim Congress
1985	Dorjee Tshering Bhutia	Sikkim Sangram Parishad
1989	Dorjee Tshering Bhutia	Sikkim Sangram Parishad
1994	Rinzing Ongmu	Sikkim Sangram Parishad
1999	Tseten Dorjee Lepcha	Sikkim Democratic Front
2004	Nimthit Lepcha	Sikkim Democratic Front

== Election results ==
=== Assembly election 2004 ===
2004 Sikkim Legislative Assembly election: Ranka
Party	Candidate	Votes	%	±%
SDF	Nimthit Lepcha	5,083	60.30%	▲3.81
INC	Pintso Chopel Lepcha	3,230	38.32%	▲36.85
SHRP	Tashi Topgay Bhutia	117	1.39%	New
Margin of victory		1,853	21.98%	▲7.55
Turnout		8,430	74.88%	▼5.07
Registered electors		11,258		▲18.94
SDF hold		Swing	▲3.81	

=== Assembly election 1999 ===
1999 Sikkim Legislative Assembly election: Ranka
Party	Candidate	Votes	%	±%
SDF	Tseten Dorjee Lepcha	4,274	56.48%	▲19.23
SSP	Pintso Chopel Lepcha	3,182	42.05%	▲4.49
INC	Yangchen Doma Bhutia	111	1.47%	▼22.01
Margin of victory		1,092	14.43%	▲14.12
Turnout		7,567	81.46%	▲0.15
Registered electors		9,465		▲28.95
SDF gain from SSP		Swing	▲18.92	

=== Assembly election 1994 ===
1994 Sikkim Legislative Assembly election: Ranka
Party	Candidate	Votes	%	±%
SSP	Rinzing Ongmu	2,200	37.56%	▼22.18
SDF	Tseten Lepcha	2,182	37.25%	New
INC	Drug Truk Gyatso Lepcha	1,375	23.48%	▼10.29
Independent	Tashi Topgay Bhutia	43	0.73%	New
Margin of victory		18	0.31%	▼25.67
Turnout		5,857	81.50%	▲3.99
Registered electors		7,340		
SSP hold		Swing	▼22.18	

=== Assembly election 1989 ===
1989 Sikkim Legislative Assembly election: Ranka
Party	Candidate	Votes	%	±%
SSP	Dorjee Tshering Bhutia	2,909	59.75%	▼5.83
INC	Sonam Tshering Lepcha	1,644	33.76%	▲1.68
RIS	Nephew Bhutia	153	3.14%	New
Margin of victory		1,265	25.98%	▼7.50
Turnout		4,869	73.27%	▲9.30
Registered electors		6,423		
SSP hold		Swing		

=== Assembly election 1985 ===
1985 Sikkim Legislative Assembly election: Ranka
Party	Candidate	Votes	%	±%
SSP	Dorjee Tshering Bhutia	1,880	65.57%	New
INC	Namgyal Topgay Bhutia	920	32.09%	New
Independent	Lobsang Palden	48	1.67%	New
Margin of victory		960	33.48%	▲32.54
Turnout		2,867	67.50%	▲2.09
Registered electors		4,311		▲38.44
SSP gain from SC (R)		Swing		

=== Assembly election 1979 ===
1979 Sikkim Legislative Assembly election: Ranka
Party	Candidate	Votes	%	±%
SC (R)	Dorjee Tshering Bhutia	679	33.85%	New
SJP	Sonam Tshering Bhutia	660	32.90%	New
SPC	Rinchen Lapcha	388	19.34%	New
JP	Dnki Choden Bhutia	213	10.62%	New
Independent	Kancha Lama	66	3.29%	New
Margin of victory		19	0.95%	
Turnout		2,006	67.24%	
Registered electors		3,114		
SC (R) win (new seat)				
