= Dentam Assembly constituency =

Constituency of the Sikkim legislative assembly in India

Coordinates: 27.25°N 88.14°E

Dentam
- Former constituency for the Sikkim Legislative Assembly

Constituency details
- Country: India
- Region: Northeast India
- State: Sikkim
- Established: 1979
- Abolished: 2008
- Total electors: 7,480

Dentam was an assembly constituency in the Indian state of Sikkim.

== Members of the Legislative Assembly ==
Election	Member	Party
1979	Padam Lall Gurung	Sikkim Congress
1985	Padam Lall Gurung	Sikkim Sangram Parishad
1989	Padam Lall Gurung	Sikkim Sangram Parishad
1994	Chakra Bahadur Subba	Sikkim Democratic Front
1999	Narendra Kumar Subba	Sikkim Democratic Front
2004	Deepak Kumar Gurung	Sikkim Democratic Front

== Election results ==
=== Assembly election 2004 ===
2004 Sikkim Legislative Assembly election: Dentam
Party	Candidate	Votes	%	±%
SDF	Deepak Kumar Gurung	4,158	65.42%	▲13.01
INC	Sher Hang Subba	2,093	32.93%	▲29.73
Independent	Mangal Dhoj Subba	105	1.65%	New
Margin of victory		2,065	32.49%	▲24.47
Turnout		6,356	84.97%	▼0.66
Registered electors		7,480		▲7.87
SDF hold		Swing	▲13.01	

=== Assembly election 1999 ===
1999 Sikkim Legislative Assembly election: Dentam
Party	Candidate	Votes	%	±%
SDF	Narendra Kumar Subba	3,112	52.41%	▲11.57
SSP	Padam Lall Gurung	2,636	44.39%	▲10.05
INC	Laxmi Prasad Subba	190	3.20%	▼16.20
Margin of victory		476	8.02%	▲1.52
Turnout		5,938	86.62%	▲1.64
Registered electors		6,934		▲8.46
SDF hold		Swing	▲11.57	

=== Assembly election 1994 ===
1994 Sikkim Legislative Assembly election: Dentam
Party	Candidate	Votes	%	±%
SDF	Chakra Bahadur Subba	2,193	40.84%	New
SSP	Padam Lall Gurung	1,844	34.34%	▼39.80
INC	Kharka Dhoj Subba	1,042	19.40%	▲7.07
Independent	Punya Prasad Sharma	291	5.42%	New
Margin of victory		349	6.50%	▼54.11
Turnout		5,370	85.53%	▲15.37
Registered electors		6,393		
SDF gain from SSP		Swing	▼33.30	

=== Assembly election 1989 ===
1989 Sikkim Legislative Assembly election: Dentam
Party	Candidate	Votes	%	±%
SSP	Padam Lall Gurung	3,102	74.14%	▼3.05
RIS	Puspa Mani Chettri	566	13.53%	New
INC	Laxmi Prasad Subba	516	12.33%	▼4.55
Margin of victory		2,536	60.61%	▲0.30
Turnout		4,184	70.92%	▲4.51
Registered electors		6,097		
SSP hold		Swing		

=== Assembly election 1985 ===
1985 Sikkim Legislative Assembly election: Dentam
Party	Candidate	Votes	%	±%
SSP	Padam Lall Gurung	2,355	77.19%	New
INC	Laxmi Prasad Subba	515	16.88%	New
JP	Padam Singh Subba	56	1.84%	▼2.90
Independent	Phurba Sherpa	54	1.77%	New
Independent	Til Bahadur Subba	41	1.34%	New
Independent	Narayan Pradhan	29	0.95%	New
Margin of victory		1,840	60.31%	▲34.34
Turnout		3,051	66.51%	▼3.37
Registered electors		4,759		▲46.30
SSP gain from SC (R)		Swing	▲33.95	

=== Assembly election 1979 ===
1979 Sikkim Legislative Assembly election: Dentam
Party	Candidate	Votes	%	±%
SC (R)	Padam Lall Gurung	949	43.23%	New
SJP	Pahalman Subba	379	17.27%	New
Independent	Kedar Jang Basnet	362	16.49%	New
SPC	Pratap Singh Tewari	206	9.38%	New
JP	Phur Tshering Lucksom	104	4.74%	New
Independent	Man Bahadur Subba	74	3.37%	New
Independent	Kul Bahadur Gurung	57	2.60%	New
Independent	Phurba Tshering Sherpa	41	1.87%	New
Independent	Babulal Goyal	23	1.05%	New
Margin of victory		570	25.97%	
Turnout		2,195	72.03%	
Registered electors		3,253		
SC (R) win (new seat)				
