= Tashiding Assembly constituency =

Constituency of the Sikkim legislative assembly in India

Tashiding
- Former constituency for the Sikkim Legislative Assembly

Constituency details
- Country: India
- Region: Northeast India
- State: Sikkim
- Established: 1979
- Abolished: 2008
- Total electors: 6,365

Tashiding Assembly constituency was an assembly constituency in the Indian state of Sikkim.

== Members of the Legislative Assembly ==
Election	Member	Party
1979	Dawgyal Pentso Bhutia	Sikkim Janata Parishad
1985	Ugen Pritso Bhutia	Sikkim Sangram Parishad
1989	Ugen Pritso Bhutia	Sikkim Sangram Parishad
1994	Thutop Bhutia	Sikkim Sangram Parishad
1999	Thutop Bhutia	Sikkim Democratic Front
2004	Dawa Narbu Takarpa	Sikkim Democratic Front

== Election results ==
=== Assembly election 2004 ===
2004 Sikkim Legislative Assembly election: Tashiding
Party	Candidate	Votes	%	±%
SDF	Dawa Narbu Takarpa	3,509	65.32%	▲10.60
INC	Sonam Dadul Kazi	1,778	33.10%	▲30.72
Independent	Pulling Lepcha	85	1.58%	New
Margin of victory		1,731	32.22%	▲20.40
Turnout		5,372	84.40%	▲1.14
Registered electors		6,365		▲5.84
SDF hold		Swing	▲10.60	

=== Assembly election 1999 ===
1999 Sikkim Legislative Assembly election: Tashiding
Party	Candidate	Votes	%	±%
SDF	Thutop Bhutia	2,740	54.72%	▲21.58
SSP	Sonam Dadul Kazi	2,148	42.90%	▲6.86
INC	Lovzang Sonam Wangyal	119	2.38%	▼11.24
Margin of victory		592	11.82%	▲8.93
Turnout		5,007	84.74%	▲2.63
Registered electors		6,014		▲6.29
SDF gain from SSP		Swing	▲18.69	

=== Assembly election 1994 ===
1994 Sikkim Legislative Assembly election: Tashiding
Party	Candidate	Votes	%	±%
SSP	Thutop Bhutia	1,644	36.04%	▼53.03
SDF	Rinzing Wangyal Kazi	1,512	33.14%	New
INC	Dawgyal P. Bhutia	621	13.61%	▲4.10
Independent	Ugen Pencho Bhutia	511	11.20%	New
Independent	Lha Tshering Lepcha	248	5.44%	New
Margin of victory		132	2.89%	▼76.66
Turnout		4,562	82.04%	▲13.51
Registered electors		5,658		
SSP hold		Swing	▼53.03	

=== Assembly election 1989 ===
1989 Sikkim Legislative Assembly election: Tashiding
Party	Candidate	Votes	%	±%
SSP	Ugen Pritso Bhutia	3,249	89.06%	▲23.12
INC	Chewang Bhutia	347	9.51%	▼17.22
RIS	Tshering Wongdi Bhutia	52	1.43%	New
Margin of victory		2,902	79.55%	▲40.34
Turnout		3,648	69.73%	▲5.12
Registered electors		5,435		
SSP hold		Swing		

=== Assembly election 1985 ===
1985 Sikkim Legislative Assembly election: Tashiding
Party	Candidate	Votes	%	±%
SSP	Ugen Pritso Bhutia	1,586	65.95%	New
INC	Dawgyal Pintso Bhutia	643	26.74%	New
Independent	Sonam Yongda	119	4.95%	New
Independent	Chungching Bhutia	38	1.58%	New
Margin of victory		943	39.21%	▲24.54
Turnout		2,405	64.60%	▲5.04
Registered electors		3,879		▲42.82
SSP gain from SJP		Swing	▲18.82	

=== Assembly election 1979 ===
1979 Sikkim Legislative Assembly election: Tashiding
Party	Candidate	Votes	%	±%
SJP	Dawgyal Pentso Bhutia	729	47.12%	New
JP	Phurba Wangyal Lassopa	502	32.45%	New
SPC	Lago Tshering Bhutia	131	8.47%	New
SC (R)	Phurba Dorjee Sherpa	107	6.92%	New
Independent	Ruth Karthok Lepchani	68	4.40%	New
Independent	Yongda Lepcha	10	0.65%	New
Margin of victory		227	14.67%	
Turnout		1,547	63.00%	
Registered electors		2,716		
SJP win (new seat)				
