= Chakung Assembly constituency =

Constituency of the Sikkim legislative assembly in India

Coordinates: 27.15°N 88.24°E

Chakung
- Former constituency for the Sikkim Legislative Assembly

Constituency details
- Country: India
- Region: Northeast India
- State: Sikkim
- Established: 1979
- Abolished: 2008
- Total electors: 8,435

Chakung was an assembly constituency in the Indian state of Sikkim.

== Members of the Legislative Assembly ==
Election	Member	Party
1979	Bhim Bahadur Gurung	Sikkim Congress
1985	Tara Man Rai	Sikkim Sangram Parishad
1989	Tara Man Rai	Sikkim Sangram Parishad
1994	Prem Singh Tamang	Sikkim Democratic Front
1999	Prem Singh Tamang	Sikkim Democratic Front
2004	Prem Singh Tamang	Sikkim Democratic Front

== Election results ==
=== Assembly election 2004 ===
2004 Sikkim Legislative Assembly election: Chakung
Party	Candidate	Votes	%	±%
SDF	Prem Singh Tamang	6,702	94.42%	▲36.48
INC	Satish Mohan Pradhan	201	2.83%	▲0.03
CPI(M)	Kul Man Mukhia	144	2.03%	New
Independent	Phur Tshering Lepcha	51	0.72%	New
Margin of victory		6,501	91.59%	▲72.90
Turnout		7,098	84.15%	▲2.42
Registered electors		8,435		▲11.83
SDF hold		Swing	▲36.48	

=== Assembly election 1999 ===
1999 Sikkim Legislative Assembly election: Chakung
Party	Candidate	Votes	%	±%
SDF	Prem Singh Tamang	3,572	57.94%	▼1.54
SSP	Tika Gurung	2,420	39.25%	▲8.10
INC	Tara Man Rai	173	2.81%	▼6.28
Margin of victory		1,152	18.69%	▼9.64
Turnout		6,165	83.73%	▼0.65
Registered electors		7,543		▲9.62
SDF hold		Swing	▼1.54	

=== Assembly election 1994 ===
1994 Sikkim Legislative Assembly election: Chakung
Party	Candidate	Votes	%	±%
SDF	Prem Singh Tamang	3,372	59.48%	New
SSP	Tika Gurung	1,766	31.15%	▼52.12
INC	Prem Prakash Gurung	515	9.08%	▲6.57
Margin of victory		1,606	28.33%	▼42.91
Turnout		5,669	84.39%	▲14.76
Registered electors		6,881		
SDF gain from SSP		Swing		

=== Assembly election 1989 ===
1989 Sikkim Legislative Assembly election: Chakung
Party	Candidate	Votes	%	±%
SSP	Tara Man Rai	3,804	83.27%	▲26.10
Independent	Rastaman Rai	550	12.04%	New
INC	Chakra Bahadur Gurung	115	2.52%	▼34.98
RIS	Vinod Kumar Dungmali	85	1.86%	New
Margin of victory		3,254	71.23%	▲51.56
Turnout		4,568	70.32%	▲1.33
Registered electors		6,755		
SSP hold		Swing	▲26.10	

=== Assembly election 1985 ===
1985 Sikkim Legislative Assembly election: Chakung
Party	Candidate	Votes	%	±%
SSP	Tara Man Rai	1,944	57.18%	New
INC	Bhim Bahadur Gurung	1,275	37.50%	New
Independent	Kul Man Mukhia	113	3.32%	New
Independent	Phur Tshering Lepcha	52	1.53%	New
Margin of victory		669	19.68%	▼30.53
Turnout		3,400	68.02%	▼3.36
Registered electors		5,129		▲46.17
SSP gain from SC (R)		Swing	▼8.49	

=== Assembly election 1979 ===
1979 Sikkim Legislative Assembly election: Chakung
Party	Candidate	Votes	%	±%
SC (R)	Bhim Bahadur Gurung	1,605	65.67%	New
SJP	Kul Man Mukhia	378	15.47%	New
JP	Rastaman Rai	242	9.90%	New
SPC	Tika Gurung	157	6.42%	New
Independent	Pratap Singh Rai	51	2.09%	New
Margin of victory		1,227	50.20%	
Turnout		2,444	72.41%	
Registered electors		3,509		
SC (R) win (new seat)				
