= Rumtek Assembly constituency =

Constituency of the Sikkim legislative assembly in India

Rumtek
- Former constituency for the Sikkim Legislative Assembly

Constituency details
- Country: India
- Region: Northeast India
- State: Sikkim
- Established: 1979
- Abolished: 2008
- Total electors: 13,726

Rumtek Assembly constituency was an assembly constituency in the Indian state of Sikkim.

== Members of the Legislative Assembly ==
Election	Member	Party
1979	Dadul Bhutia	Sikkim Janata Parishad
1985	Ongay Tob Shutia	Sikkim Sangram Parishad
1989	O. T. Bhutia	Sikkim Sangram Parishad
1994	Menlom Lepcha	Sikkim Sangram Parishad
1999	Karma Tempo Namgyal Gyaltsen	Sikkim Democratic Front
2004	Menlom Lepcha	Sikkim Democratic Front

== Election results ==
=== Assembly election 2004 ===
2004 Sikkim Legislative Assembly election: Rumtek
Party	Candidate	Votes	%	±%
SDF	Menlom Lepcha	5,639	56.61%	▲6.38
INC	Delay Namgyal Barfungpa	4,323	43.39%	▲41.60
Margin of victory		1,316	13.21%	▲10.96
Turnout		9,962	72.58%	▼4.08
Registered electors		13,726		▲22.17
SDF hold		Swing	▲6.38	

=== Assembly election 1999 ===
1999 Sikkim Legislative Assembly election: Rumtek
Party	Candidate	Votes	%	±%
SDF	Karma Tempo Namgyal Gyaltsen	4,326	50.23%	▲20.79
SSP	O. T. Bhutia	4,132	47.97%	▲4.10
INC	Ugen Tshering Lepcha	155	1.80%	▼20.57
Margin of victory		194	2.25%	▼12.18
Turnout		8,613	78.03%	▼1.92
Registered electors		11,235		▲32.01
SDF gain from SSP		Swing	▲6.36	

=== Assembly election 1994 ===
1994 Sikkim Legislative Assembly election: Rumtek
Party	Candidate	Votes	%	±%
SSP	Menlom Lepcha	2,934	43.87%	▼19.27
SDF	Karma Tempo Namgyal Gyaltsen	1,969	29.44%	New
INC	O. T. Bhutia	1,496	22.37%	▼5.44
Independent	Nima Lepcha	207	3.10%	New
RSP	Uttam Lepcha	48	0.72%	New
Margin of victory		965	14.43%	▼20.90
Turnout		6,688	80.33%	▲3.83
Registered electors		8,511		
SSP hold		Swing	▼19.27	

=== Assembly election 1989 ===
1989 Sikkim Legislative Assembly election: Rumtek
Party	Candidate	Votes	%	±%
SSP	O. T. Bhutia	3,126	63.14%	▲1.70
INC	Sonam Pintso Wangdi	1,377	27.81%	▲7.66
RIS	Phigu Tshering	285	5.76%	New
Margin of victory		1,749	35.33%	▼5.96
Turnout		4,951	72.29%	▲16.56
Registered electors		6,623		
SSP hold		Swing		

=== Assembly election 1985 ===
1985 Sikkim Legislative Assembly election: Rumtek
Party	Candidate	Votes	%	±%
SSP	Ongay Tob Shutia	1,933	61.44%	New
INC	Rinzing Ongmo	634	20.15%	▲18.63
Independent	Namayal Tshering Bhutia	414	13.16%	New
Independent	Namgey Bhutia	120	3.81%	New
Independent	Kinga Bhutia	27	0.86%	New
SPC	Phingu Tshering	18	0.57%	▼24.21
Margin of victory		1,299	41.29%	▲27.05
Turnout		3,146	58.92%	▲1.92
Registered electors		5,406		▲25.25
SSP gain from SJP		Swing	▲22.41	

=== Assembly election 1979 ===
1979 Sikkim Legislative Assembly election: Rumtek
Party	Candidate	Votes	%	±%
SJP	Dadul Bhutia	948	39.03%	New
SPC	Karma Gyampo Bhutia	602	24.78%	New
JP	Namgyal Tshering Bhutia	405	16.67%	New
SC (R)	K. Lama Changkapa	336	13.83%	New
Independent	Dawa Tashi Bhutia	79	3.25%	New
INC	Tshering Pintso Bhutia	37	1.52%	New
Independent	Tenzing Bhutia	16	0.66%	New
Margin of victory		346	14.24%	
Turnout		2,429	59.06%	
Registered electors		4,316		
SJP win (new seat)				
