= Barmiok Assembly constituency =

Constituency of the Sikkim legislative assembly in India

Coordinates: 27.25°N 88.24°E

Barmiok
- Former constituency for the Sikkim Legislative Assembly

Constituency details
- Country: India
- Region: Northeast India
- State: Sikkim
- Established: 1979
- Abolished: 2004
- Total electors: 6,888

Barmiok was an assembly constituency in the Indian state of Sikkim.

== Members of the Legislative Assembly ==
Election	Member	Party
1979	Til Bahadur Limbu	Sikkim Janata Parishad
1985	Birbal Subba	Sikkim Sangram Parishad
1989	Birbal Subba	Sikkim Sangram Parishad
1994	Tulshi Prasad Pradhan	Sikkim Democratic Front
1999	Tulshi Prasad Pradhan	Sikkim Democratic Front
2004	Narendra Kumar Subba	Sikkim Democratic Front

== Election results ==
=== Assembly election 2004 ===
2004 Sikkim Legislative Assembly election: Barmiok
Party	Candidate	Votes	%	±%
SDF	Narendra Kumar Subba	4,029	71.92%	▲26.17
INC	Puspak Ram Subba	1,479	26.40%	▲11.43
Independent	Om Prakash Bista	48	0.86%	New
Independent	Puran Kumar Chettri	46	0.82%	New
Margin of victory		2,550	45.52%	▲39.04
Turnout		5,602	81.33%	▲1.51
Registered electors		6,888		▲6.91
SDF hold		Swing	▲26.17	

=== Assembly election 1999 ===
1999 Sikkim Legislative Assembly election: Barmiok
Party	Candidate	Votes	%	±%
SDF	Tulshi Prasad Pradhan	2,353	45.75%	▲2.26
SSP	Birendra Subba	2,020	39.28%	▲5.65
INC	Laxmi Prashad Tiwari	770	14.97%	▼5.98
Margin of victory		333	6.47%	▼3.38
Turnout		5,143	81.28%	▼2.31
Registered electors		6,443		▲14.66
SDF hold		Swing	▲2.26	

=== Assembly election 1994 ===
1994 Sikkim Legislative Assembly election: Barmiok
Party	Candidate	Votes	%	±%
SDF	Tulshi Prasad Pradhan	2,007	43.49%	New
SSP	Birendra Subba	1,552	33.63%	▼35.62
INC	Birbal Tamling	967	20.95%	▲19.37
Independent	Praveen Gurung	30	0.65%	New
RSP	Pushpa Lall Sharma	30	0.65%	New
Independent	Vir Man Subba	29	0.63%	New
Margin of victory		455	9.86%	▼32.98
Turnout		4,615	83.89%	▲13.14
Registered electors		5,619		
SDF gain from SSP		Swing	▼25.76	

=== Assembly election 1989 ===
1989 Sikkim Legislative Assembly election: Barmiok
Party	Candidate	Votes	%	±%
SSP	Bir Bal Subba	2,624	69.25%	▲25.46
RIS	Ram Chandra Poudyal	1,001	26.42%	New
Denzong Peoples Chogpi	Janardhan Limboo	83	2.19%	New
INC	Ran Bahadur Subba	60	1.58%	▼39.79
Independent	Dhan Lall Lamboo	21	0.55%	New
Margin of victory		1,623	42.83%	▲40.42
Turnout		3,789	72.10%	▼0.75
Registered electors		5,492		
SSP hold		Swing	▲25.46	

=== Assembly election 1985 ===
1985 Sikkim Legislative Assembly election: Barmiok
Party	Candidate	Votes	%	±%
SSP	Birbal Subba	1,287	43.79%	New
INC	Manita Prdhan	1,216	41.37%	New
Independent	Birkha Bahadur Subba	314	10.68%	New
Independent	Dhanlal Subba	48	1.63%	New
Independent	Gangaram	41	1.40%	New
Margin of victory		71	2.42%	▼10.57
Turnout		2,939	71.74%	▲3.08
Registered electors		4,214		▲35.59
SSP gain from SJP		Swing	▲10.59	

=== Assembly election 1979 ===
1979 Sikkim Legislative Assembly election: Barmiok
Party	Candidate	Votes	%	±%
SJP	Til Bahadur Limbu	688	33.20%	New
SPC	Bhakta Bahadur Chetri	419	20.22%	New
SC (R)	Manita Pradhan	419	20.22%	New
Independent	Moni Prasad Subba	305	14.72%	New
Independent	Needup Lepcha	112	5.41%	New
JP	Mani Raj Rai	70	3.38%	New
Independent	Devi Prasad Gurung	25	1.21%	New
Independent	Padam Singh Subba	18	0.87%	New
Independent	Jag Bahadur Chhetri	16	0.77%	New
Margin of victory		269	12.98%	
Turnout		2,072	71.07%	
Registered electors		3,108		
SJP win (new seat)				
