= Loosing Pachekhani Assembly constituency =

Constituency of the Sikkim legislative assembly in India

Loosing Pachekhani
- Former constituency for the Sikkim Legislative Assembly

Constituency details
- Country: India
- Region: Northeast India
- State: Sikkim
- Established: 1979
- Abolished: 2008
- Total electors: 7,530

Loosing Pachekhani Assembly constituency was an assembly constituency in the Indian state of Sikkim.

== Members of the Legislative Assembly ==
Election	Member	Party
1979	Jagat Bandhu Pradhan	Sikkim Congress
1985	Bhakta Bahadur Khulal	Sikkim Sangram Parishad
1989	Rup Raj Rai	Sikkim Sangram Parishad
1994	Dil Bahadur Thapa	Sikkim Democratic Front
1999	Jai Kumar Bhandari	Sikkim Sangram Parishad
2004	Manita Thapa	Sikkim Democratic Front

== Election results ==
=== Assembly election 2004 ===
2004 Sikkim Legislative Assembly election: Loosing Pachekhani
Party	Candidate	Votes	%	±%
SDF	Manita Thapa	4,394	71.73%	▲23.86
INC	Bharat Basnett	1,651	26.95%	▲22.78
SHRP	Passang Tamang	81	1.32%	New
Margin of victory		2,743	44.78%	▲44.69
Turnout		6,126	81.35%	▼1.13
Registered electors		7,530		▲5.40
SDF gain from SSP		Swing	▲23.77	

=== Assembly election 1999 ===
1999 Sikkim Legislative Assembly election: Loosing Pachekhani
Party	Candidate	Votes	%	±%
SSP	Jai Kumar Bhandari	2,826	47.96%	▲16.91
SDF	Vinod Pradhan	2,821	47.87%	▲16.57
INC	Arun Kumar Rai	246	4.17%	▼2.83
Margin of victory		5	0.08%	▼0.17
Turnout		5,893	84.00%	▲1.15
Registered electors		7,144		▲21.50
SSP gain from SDF		Swing	▲16.66	

=== Assembly election 1994 ===
1994 Sikkim Legislative Assembly election: Loosing Pachekhani
Party	Candidate	Votes	%	±%
SDF	Dil Bahadur Thapa	1,497	31.30%	New
SSP	Jai Kumar Bhandari	1,485	31.05%	▼19.01
RSP	Ram Chandra Poudyal	1,378	28.81%	New
INC	Rup Raj Rai	335	7.00%	▲3.45
Independent	Bhakta Bahadur Khulal	63	1.32%	New
Independent	Bharat Singh Rai	25	0.52%	New
Margin of victory		12	0.25%	▼7.64
Turnout		4,783	83.35%	▲4.31
Registered electors		5,880		
SDF gain from SSP		Swing	▼18.76	

=== Assembly election 1989 ===
1989 Sikkim Legislative Assembly election: Loosing Pachekhani
Party	Candidate	Votes	%	±%
SSP	Rup Raj Rai	1,859	50.05%	▼17.43
RIS	Ram Chandra Poudyal	1,566	42.16%	New
INC	Bharat Singh Rai	132	3.55%	▼28.36
Margin of victory		293	7.89%	▼27.68
Turnout		3,714	73.78%	▲16.90
Registered electors		4,821		
SSP hold		Swing		

=== Assembly election 1985 ===
1985 Sikkim Legislative Assembly election: Loosing Pachekhani
Party	Candidate	Votes	%	±%
SSP	Bhakta Bahadur Khulal	1,787	67.48%	New
INC	Ram Chandra Poudyal	845	31.91%	▲29.77
JP	Ram Krishna Rai	16	0.60%	▼7.82
Margin of victory		942	35.57%	▲7.92
Turnout		2,648	61.00%	▲5.30
Registered electors		4,403		▲20.30
SSP gain from SC (R)		Swing		

=== Assembly election 1979 ===
1979 Sikkim Legislative Assembly election: Loosing Pachekhani
Party	Candidate	Votes	%	±%
SC (R)	Jagat Bandhu Pradhan	889	44.29%	New
SJP	Bans Bahadur Basnet	334	16.64%	New
SPC	Rup Raj Rai	325	16.19%	New
JP	Shova Kanti Lepcha	169	8.42%	New
Independent	Bhim Bahadur Subba	120	5.98%	New
Independent	Bhakta Bahadur Khulal	79	3.94%	New
INC	Narayan Prasad Pradhan	43	2.14%	New
Independent	Mohan Gurung	18	0.90%	New
Independent	Damber Kumari Pradhan	17	0.85%	New
Independent	Mangal Singh Tamang	13	0.65%	New
Margin of victory		555	27.65%	
Turnout		2,007	57.13%	
Registered electors		3,660		
SC (R) win (new seat)				
