= Rateypani–West Pendam Assembly constituency =

Constituency of the Sikkim legislative assembly in India

Rateypani–West Pendam
- Former constituency for the Sikkim Legislative Assembly

Constituency details
- Country: India
- Region: Northeast India
- State: Sikkim
- Established: 1979
- Abolished: 2008
- Total electors: 10,253

Rateypani–West Pendam Assembly constituency was an assembly constituency in the Indian state of Sikkim.

== Members of the Legislative Assembly ==
Election	Member	Party
1979	Bir Bahadur Lohar	Sikkim Congress
1985	Chandra Kumar Mohora	Sikkim Sangram Parishad
1989	Chandra Kumar Mohora	Sikkim Sangram Parishad
1994	Aita Singh Baraily (Kami)	Sikkim Democratic Front
1999	Chandra Kumar Mohora	Sikkim Democratic Front
2004	Aita Singh Baraily (Kami)	Sikkim Democratic Front

== Election results ==
=== Assembly election 2004 ===
2004 Sikkim Legislative Assembly election: Rateypani–West Pendam
Party	Candidate	Votes	%	±%
SDF	Aita Singh Baraily (Kami)	6,553	83.46%	▲27.32
INC	Janga Bir Darnal	1,170	14.90%	▲13.98
Independent	Tek Bahadur Thatal	129	1.64%	New
Margin of victory		5,383	68.56%	▲55.35
Turnout		7,852	76.58%	▼5.78
Registered electors		10,253		▲16.39
SDF hold		Swing	▲27.32	

=== Assembly election 1999 ===
1999 Sikkim Legislative Assembly election: Rateypani–West Pendam
Party	Candidate	Votes	%	±%
SDF	Chandra Kumar Mohora	4,073	56.14%	▲0.50
SSP	Madan Kumar Cintury	3,115	42.94%	▲7.26
INC	Ravindra Madan Rasaily	67	0.92%	▼4.90
Margin of victory		958	13.20%	▼6.76
Turnout		7,255	83.94%	▲2.35
Registered electors		8,809		▲15.03
SDF hold		Swing	▲0.50	

=== Assembly election 1994 ===
1994 Sikkim Legislative Assembly election: Rateypani–West Pendam
Party	Candidate	Votes	%	±%
SDF	Aita Singh Baraily (Kami)	3,409	55.64%	New
SSP	Madan Kumar Cintury	2,186	35.68%	▼34.56
INC	Bir Bahadur Lohar	357	5.83%	▼6.63
RSP	Kamal Kumar Khati	88	1.44%	New
Independent	Isory Majhi	62	1.01%	New
Margin of victory		1,223	19.96%	▼37.83
Turnout		6,127	82.10%	▲9.62
Registered electors		7,658		
SDF gain from SSP		Swing	▼14.60	

=== Assembly election 1989 ===
1989 Sikkim Legislative Assembly election: Rateypani–West Pendam
Party	Candidate	Votes	%	±%
SSP	Chandra Kumar Mohora	3,401	70.24%	▲1.79
INC	Madhukar Darjee	603	12.45%	▼4.39
RIS	K. K. Thatal	518	10.70%	New
Margin of victory		2,798	57.79%	▲6.19
Turnout		4,842	65.74%	▲5.96
Registered electors		6,879		
SSP hold		Swing		

=== Assembly election 1985 ===
1985 Sikkim Legislative Assembly election: Rateypani–West Pendam
Party	Candidate	Votes	%	±%
SSP	Chandra Kumar Mohora	2,373	68.45%	New
INC	Badri Thatal	584	16.84%	▲14.43
Independent	Madhukar Darjee	349	10.07%	New
Independent	Bir Bahadur Lohar	111	3.20%	New
Independent	Deepandra Kumar Singh	50	1.44%	New
Margin of victory		1,789	51.60%	▲28.87
Turnout		3,467	66.75%	▲4.31
Registered electors		5,381		▲30.39
SSP gain from SC (R)		Swing	▲14.11	

=== Assembly election 1979 ===
1979 Sikkim Legislative Assembly election: Rateypani–West Pendam
Party	Candidate	Votes	%	±%
SC (R)	Bir Bahadur Lohar	1,348	54.33%	New
SPC	Isory Majhi	784	31.60%	New
SJP	Durga Singh Cintury	134	5.40%	New
Sikkim Scheduled Caste League	Purna Bahadur Khati	68	2.74%	New
INC	Kushudas Darjee	60	2.42%	New
Independent	Janga Bahadur Khati	52	2.10%	New
JP	Sahabir Kami	35	1.41%	New
Margin of victory		564	22.73%	
Turnout		2,481	64.96%	
Registered electors		4,127		
SC (R) win (new seat)				
