= Martam Assembly constituency =

Constituency of the Sikkim legislative assembly in India

Martam
- Former constituency for the Sikkim Legislative Assembly

Constituency details
- Country: India
- Region: Northeast India
- State: Sikkim
- Established: 1979
- Abolished: 2008
- Total electors: 9,316

Martam Assembly constituency was an assembly constituency in the Indian state of Sikkim.

== Members of the Legislative Assembly ==
Election	Member	Party
1979	Samten Tshering	Sikkim Janata Parishad
1985	Chamla Tshering Bhutia	Sikkim Sangram Parishad
1989	Chamla Tshering Bhutia	Sikkim Sangram Parishad
1994	Dorjee Tshering Lepcha	Sikkim Sangram Parishad
1999	Dorjee Tshering Lepcha	Sikkim Democratic Front
2004	Dorjee Tshering Lepcha	Sikkim Democratic Front

== Election results ==
=== Assembly election 2004 ===
2004 Sikkim Legislative Assembly election: Martam
Party	Candidate	Votes	%	±%
SDF	Dorjee Tshering Lepcha	5,668	74.44%	▲12.18
INC	Sonam Tshering Bhutia	1,946	25.56%	▲24.13
Margin of victory		3,722	48.88%	▲22.92
Turnout		7,614	81.73%	▲2.04
Registered electors		9,316		▲8.46
SDF hold		Swing	▲12.18	

=== Assembly election 1999 ===
1999 Sikkim Legislative Assembly election: Martam
Party	Candidate	Votes	%	±%
SDF	Dorjee Tshering Lepcha	4,262	62.26%	▲34.41
SSP	Nuk Tshering Bhutia	2,485	36.30%	▼13.67
INC	Naku Lepcha	98	1.43%	▼20.00
Margin of victory		1,777	25.96%	▲3.84
Turnout		6,845	81.44%	▼1.61
Registered electors		8,589		▲18.09
SDF gain from SSP		Swing	▲12.29	

=== Assembly election 1994 ===
1994 Sikkim Legislative Assembly election: Martam
Party	Candidate	Votes	%	±%
SSP	Dorjee Tshering Lepcha	2,955	49.97%	▲3.61
SDF	Samten Tshering Bhutia	1,647	27.85%	New
INC	Rinchen Topden	1,267	21.43%	▼4.91
Margin of victory		1,308	22.12%	▲2.10
Turnout		5,913	82.98%	▲2.76
Registered electors		7,273		
SSP hold		Swing		

=== Assembly election 1989 ===
1989 Sikkim Legislative Assembly election: Martam
Party	Candidate	Votes	%	±%
SSP	Chamla Tshering Bhutia	1,968	46.36%	▼27.24
INC	Samten Tshering	1,118	26.34%	▲3.84
Independent	Rinchen Topden	692	16.30%	New
RIS	Phigu Thakpa	137	3.23%	New
Independent	Naku Lepcha	46	1.08%	New
Independent	Chung Chung Bhutia	25	0.59%	New
Margin of victory		850	20.02%	▼31.07
Turnout		4,245	73.75%	▲8.34
Registered electors		5,405		
SSP hold		Swing	▼27.24	

=== Assembly election 1985 ===
1985 Sikkim Legislative Assembly election: Martam
Party	Candidate	Votes	%	±%
SSP	Chamla Tshering Bhutia	2,113	73.60%	New
INC	Palden Wangchun	646	22.50%	New
Independent	Dugo Bhutia	84	2.93%	New
Independent	Ruth Karthak Lapchani	28	0.98%	New
Margin of victory		1,467	51.10%	▲44.33
Turnout		2,871	71.32%	▲15.01
Registered electors		4,090		▲14.05
SSP gain from SJP		Swing	▲36.66	

=== Assembly election 1979 ===
1979 Sikkim Legislative Assembly election: Martam
Party	Candidate	Votes	%	±%
SJP	Samten Tshering	731	36.94%	New
SPC	Rapzang Lama	597	30.17%	New
JP	Palden Wangchun	359	18.14%	New
SC (R)	Tsewang Gyamtso Bhutia	177	8.94%	New
Independent	Ruth Karthak Lepchani	82	4.14%	New
Independent	Tseten Gyatso Bhutia	33	1.67%	New
Margin of victory		134	6.77%	
Turnout		1,979	57.03%	
Registered electors		3,586		
SJP win (new seat)				
