= Ram Chandra Poudyal =

Indian politician (1944–2024)

President of Rising Sun Party
- In office 1989–1990

President of SC(R)
- In office 1979–1981

Member of the Sikkim Legislative Assembly
- In office 1975–1979
- Preceded by: New constituency
- Succeeded by: Jagat Bandhu Pradhan
- Constituency: Loosing-Pachekhani

1st Deputy Speaker of the Sikkim Legislative Assembly
- In office 1975–1977
- Succeeded by: Kalzang Gyatso

Member of the Sikkim State Council
- In office 1974–1975
- Preceded by: New constituency
- Constituency: Loosing-Pachekhani

Personal details
- Born: 1943 or 1944 (age 81–82) Chhota Singtam, Kingdom of Sikkim
- Died: July 2024 Siliguri, West Bengal, India
- Party: Rising Sun Party
- Other political affiliations: Sikkim National Congress, Sikkim Congress (Revolutionary)

Ram Chandra Poudyal (1944–2024), commonly known as R.C. Poudyal, was an Indian politician from the state of Sikkim. He has played an important role in the political scenario of the state, especially in the context of integration of Sikkim and subsequent constitutional and legal developments into the Indian Union . He was known for the founding and leading the Rising Sun Party (RSP), a political party active in the late 1980s.

== Early life and education ==
He completed his schooling at Sir Tashi Namgyal Academy in Gangtok, Sikkim. For higher education, he attended Scottish Church College in Kolkata, West Bengal, where he pursued his degree in law.

== Legal battle ==
Poudyal is known also for the landmark case of R.C. Poudyal vs. Union of India (1993), where he brought forward to question the reservation policies in the Sikkim Legislative Assembly. He argued that the disproportionate reservation of seats for the Bhutia-Lepcha community was discriminatory and violated the principles of fair representation under the Indian Constitution. The Supreme Court, however, upheld the reservations, emphasizing the unique historical and cultural context of Sikkim.

== Death ==
As per newspaper reports on 18 July 2024: his body was found floating in the teesta in Bangladesh on 16 July, Tuesday, nine days after he was reported missing from his hometown in Sikkim's chhota singtam. SIT is probing into this matter.

== Electoral records ==
State Council (Sikkim) election

Year	Constituency	Political Party	Result	Position	Votes	% Votes	% Margin	Deposit	Source
1974	Loosing-Pachekhani	SNC	Won	-					

Sikkim Legislative Assembly election

Year	Constituency	Political Party	Result	Position	Votes	% Votes	% Margin	Deposit	Source
1985	Loosing Pachekhani	INC	Lost	2nd	845	31.46			
1989	Loosing Pachekhani	RIS	Lost	2nd	1566	42.16			
1989	Barmiok	RIS	Lost	2nd	1001	26.42			
1994	Loosing Pachekhani	RSP	Lost	3rd	1378	28.81			
