= Lachen Mangshila Assembly constituency =

Constituency of the Sikkim legislative assembly in India

Lachen Mangshila
- Former constituency for the Sikkim Legislative Assembly

Constituency details
- Country: India
- Region: Northeast India
- State: Sikkim
- Established: 1979
- Abolished: 2008
- Total electors: 7,713

Lachen Mangshila Assembly constituency was an assembly constituency in the Indian state of Sikkim.

== Members of the Legislative Assembly ==
Election	Member	Party
1979	Tenzing Dadul Bhutia	Sikkim Janata Parishad
1985	Thokchok Bhutia	Sikkim Sangram Parishad
1989	Tasa Tengey Lepcha	Sikkim Sangram Parishad
1994	Hishey Lachungpa	Sikkim Democratic Front
1999	Hishey Lachungpa	Sikkim Democratic Front
2004	Hishey Lachungpa	Sikkim Democratic Front

== Election results ==
=== Assembly election 2004 ===
2004 Sikkim Legislative Assembly election: Lachen Mangshila
Party	Candidate	Votes	%	±%
SDF	Hishey Lachungpa	4,906	75.56%	▲16.01
INC	Anil Lachenpa	1,587	24.44%	New
Margin of victory		3,319	51.12%	▲31.67
Turnout		6,493	84.18%	▼1.67
Registered electors		7,713		▲4.54
SDF hold		Swing	▲16.01	

=== Assembly election 1999 ===
1999 Sikkim Legislative Assembly election: Lachen Mangshila
Party	Candidate	Votes	%	±%
SDF	Hishey Lachungpa	3,772	59.55%	▲14.13
SSP	Nedup Tshering Lachenpa	2,540	40.10%	▲13.37
Margin of victory		1,232	19.45%	▲1.88
Turnout		6,334	87.79%	▲6.48
Registered electors		7,378		▲14.85
SDF hold		Swing	▲14.13	

=== Assembly election 1994 ===
1994 Sikkim Legislative Assembly election: Lachen Mangshila
Party	Candidate	Votes	%	±%
SDF	Hishey Lachungpa	2,316	45.42%	New
INC	Tseten Lepcha	1,420	27.85%	▲0.70
SSP	Ganden Tshering Lachungpa	1,363	26.73%	▼37.78
Margin of victory		896	17.57%	▼19.79
Turnout		5,099	81.55%	▲4.43
Registered electors		6,424		
SDF gain from SSP		Swing		

=== Assembly election 1989 ===
1989 Sikkim Legislative Assembly election: Lachen Mangshila
Party	Candidate	Votes	%	±%
SSP	Tasa Tengey Lepcha	2,452	64.51%	▲5.45
INC	Nimching Lepcha	1,032	27.15%	▼9.47
Independent	Sonam Wangchuk Lepcha	75	1.97%	New
RIS	Loden Lepcha	42	1.10%	New
Margin of victory		1,420	37.36%	▲14.92
Turnout		3,801	71.00%	▲13.16
Registered electors		5,072		
SSP hold		Swing	▲5.45	

=== Assembly election 1985 ===
1985 Sikkim Legislative Assembly election: Lachen Mangshila
Party	Candidate	Votes	%	±%
SSP	Thokchok Bhutia	1,737	59.06%	New
INC	Tenzing Dadul	1,077	36.62%	New
Independent	Shupan Kazi	117	3.98%	New
Margin of victory		660	22.44%	▲4.54
Turnout		2,941	63.78%	▲12.09
Registered electors		4,760		▲24.90
SSP gain from SJP		Swing		

=== Assembly election 1979 ===
1979 Sikkim Legislative Assembly election: Lachen Mangshila
Party	Candidate	Votes	%	±%
SJP	Tenzing Dadul Bhutia	864	45.62%	New
JP	Tasha Tengay Lepcha	525	27.72%	New
Independent	Sangay Dubo Kazi	252	13.31%	New
Independent	Thokchok Bhutia	183	9.66%	New
SPC	Phutik Bhutia	70	3.70%	New
Margin of victory		339	17.90%	
Turnout		1,894	53.35%	
Registered electors		3,811		
SJP win (new seat)				
