= Damthang Assembly constituency =

Constituency of the Sikkim legislative assembly in India

Coordinates: 27.23°N 88.38°E

Damthang
- Former constituency for the Sikkim Legislative Assembly

Constituency details
- Country: India
- Region: Northeast India
- State: Sikkim
- Established: 1979
- Abolished: 2008
- Total electors: 10,250

Damthang Assembly constituency was an assembly constituency in the Indian state of Sikkim.

== Members of the Legislative Assembly ==
Election	Member	Party
1979	Pradeep Yanzone	Sikkim Congress
1985	Pawan Kumar Chamling	Sikkim Sangram Parishad
1989	Pawan Kumar Chamling	Sikkim Sangram Parishad
1994	Pawan Kumar Chamling	Sikkim Democratic Front
1999	Pawan Kumar Chamling	Sikkim Democratic Front
2004	Pawan Kumar Chamling	Sikkim Democratic Front

== Election results ==
=== Assembly election 2004 ===
2004 Sikkim Legislative Assembly election: Damthang
Party	Candidate	Votes	%	±%
SDF	Pawan Kumar Chamling	Unopposed		
Registered electors		10,250		▲21.66
SDF hold		Swing		

=== Assembly election 1999 ===
1999 Sikkim Legislative Assembly election: Damthang
Party	Candidate	Votes	%	±%
SDF	Pawan Kumar Chamling	4,952	72.26%	▲1.99
SSP	Kamal Kumar Rai	1,866	27.23%	▲0.90
INC	Hom Nath Rai	35	0.51%	▼1.94
Margin of victory		3,086	45.03%	▲1.10
Turnout		6,853	82.34%	▲2.58
Registered electors		8,425		▲19.44
SDF hold		Swing	▲1.99	

=== Assembly election 1994 ===
1994 Sikkim Legislative Assembly election: Damthang
Party	Candidate	Votes	%	±%
SDF	Pawan Kumar Chamling	3,904	70.27%	New
SSP	Kumar Subba	1,463	26.33%	▼67.94
INC	Anand Lama	136	2.45%	▼3.28
Independent	Budha Raj Rai	53	0.95%	New
Margin of victory		2,441	43.93%	▼44.60
Turnout		5,556	80.27%	▲8.56
Registered electors		7,054		
SDF gain from SSP		Swing	▼24.00	

=== Assembly election 1989 ===
1989 Sikkim Legislative Assembly election: Damthang
Party	Candidate	Votes	%	±%
SSP	Pawan Kumar Chamling	4,227	94.27%	▲20.47
INC	Suraj Kumar Khartan	257	5.73%	▼11.06
Margin of victory		3,970	88.54%	▲31.53
Turnout		4,484	71.46%	▲7.26
Registered electors		6,387		
SSP hold		Swing		

=== Assembly election 1985 ===
1985 Sikkim Legislative Assembly election: Damthang
Party	Candidate	Votes	%	±%
SSP	Pawan Kumar Chamling	2,281	73.79%	New
INC	Pradeep Yonzong	519	16.79%	▲7.96
Independent	S. K. Rai	156	5.05%	New
Independent	Binod Rai	108	3.49%	New
Margin of victory		1,762	57.00%	▲55.47
Turnout		3,091	64.45%	▼4.03
Registered electors		4,911		▲29.65
SSP gain from SC (R)		Swing	▲47.74	

=== Assembly election 1979 ===
1979 Sikkim Legislative Assembly election: Damthang
Party	Candidate	Votes	%	±%
SC (R)	Pradeep Yanzone	661	26.05%	New
SJP	Mani Raj Rai	622	24.52%	New
SPC	Badri Lall Pradhan	323	12.73%	New
JP	Kharga Bahadur Rai	239	9.42%	New
Independent	Dorjee Tshering Bhutia	236	9.30%	New
INC	Kalu Rai	224	8.83%	New
Independent	Bhupal Chamling	68	2.68%	New
Independent	Bir Bahadur Pradhan	57	2.25%	New
Independent	Kumar Subba	55	2.17%	New
Independent	Hanuman Das Agarwal	32	1.26%	New
Independent	Chit Man Rai	15	0.59%	New
Margin of victory		39	1.54%	
Turnout		2,537	70.27%	
Registered electors		3,788		
SC (R) win (new seat)				
