= Rakdong Tentek Assembly constituency =

Constituency of the Sikkim legislative assembly in India

Coordinates: 27.387°N 88.518°E

Rakdong Tentek
- Former constituency for the Sikkim Legislative Assembly

Constituency details
- Country: India
- Region: Northeast India
- State: Sikkim
- Established: 1979
- Abolished: 2008
- Total electors: 7,602

Rakdong Tentek Assembly constituency was an assembly constituency in the Indian state of Sikkim.

== Members of the Legislative Assembly ==
Election	Member	Party
1979	Dugo Bhutia	Sikkim Prajatantra Congress
1985	Phuchung Bhutia	Sikkim Sangram Parishad
1989	Phuchung Bhutia	Sikkim Sangram Parishad
1994	Mingma Tshering Sherpa	Sikkim Sangram Parishad
1999	Mingma Tshering Sherpa	Sikkim Sangram Parishad
2004	Norzong Lepcha	Sikkim Democratic Front

== Election results ==
=== Assembly election 2004 ===
2004 Sikkim Legislative Assembly election: Rakdong Tentek
Party	Candidate	Votes	%	±%
SDF	Norzong Lepcha	3,809	61.85%	▲41.04
INC	Phuchung Bhutia	2,116	34.36%	▲30.42
BJP	Nima Rapzang Lama	233	3.78%	New
Margin of victory		1,693	27.49%	▼3.23
Turnout		6,158	81.00%	▲4.46
Registered electors		7,602		▲6.22
SDF gain from SSP		Swing	▲10.32	

=== Assembly election 1999 ===
1999 Sikkim Legislative Assembly election: Rakdong Tentek
Party	Candidate	Votes	%	±%
SSP	Mingma Tshering Sherpa	2,823	51.53%	▼3.01
SDF	Danorbu Sherpa	1,140	20.81%	▲11.67
Independent	Sonam Tshering Bhutia	987	18.02%	New
CPI(M)	Norzang Lepcha	312	5.70%	▲1.94
INC	Dawa Lamu	216	3.94%	▼12.99
Margin of victory		1,683	30.72%	▼6.89
Turnout		5,478	79.17%	▼2.75
Registered electors		7,157		▲9.17
SSP hold		Swing	▼3.01	

=== Assembly election 1994 ===
1994 Sikkim Legislative Assembly election: Rakdong Tentek
Party	Candidate	Votes	%	±%
SSP	Mingma Tshering Sherpa	2,835	54.54%	▼8.17
INC	Phuchung Bhutia	880	16.93%	▲13.36
SDF	Dawa Tshering Sherpa	475	9.14%	New
RSP	Sonam Tshering Bhutia	447	8.60%	New
CPI(M)	Rinzing Bhutia	195	3.75%	New
Independent	Dawa Bhutia	193	3.71%	New
Independent	Nim Tshering Lepcha	111	2.14%	New
Independent	Sonam Pintso Bhutia	40	0.77%	New
Margin of victory		1,955	37.61%	▲4.01
Turnout		5,198	81.94%	▲3.00
Registered electors		6,556		
SSP hold		Swing	▼8.17	

=== Assembly election 1989 ===
1989 Sikkim Legislative Assembly election: Rakdong Tentek
Party	Candidate	Votes	%	±%
SSP	Phuchung Bhutia	2,650	62.71%	▲0.18
RIS	Rinzing Tongden	1,230	29.11%	New
INC	Dawa Lhamu	151	3.57%	▼15.78
Margin of victory		1,420	33.60%	▼9.58
Turnout		4,226	72.76%	▲13.62
Registered electors		5,540		
SSP hold		Swing		

=== Assembly election 1985 ===
1985 Sikkim Legislative Assembly election: Rakdong Tentek
Party	Candidate	Votes	%	±%
SSP	Phuchung Bhutia	1,829	62.53%	New
INC	Sonam Tshering Bhutia	566	19.35%	New
Independent	Rinzing Tongden Lepcha	456	15.59%	New
Independent	Samdup Lepcha	37	1.26%	New
Independent	Tenzing Gyastso	20	0.68%	New
SPC	Phigu Tshering	17	0.58%	▼57.02
Margin of victory		1,263	43.18%	▲6.26
Turnout		2,925	63.82%	▼0.44
Registered electors		4,668		▲22.33
SSP gain from SPC		Swing	▲4.93	

=== Assembly election 1979 ===
1979 Sikkim Legislative Assembly election: Rakdong Tentek
Party	Candidate	Votes	%	±%
SPC	Dugo Bhutia	1,387	57.60%	New
SJP	Loden Tshering Bhutia	498	20.68%	New
JP	Rinzing Tongden Lepcha	332	13.79%	New
Independent	Ugen Tshering Lasopa	119	4.94%	New
Independent	Leythup Lepcha	72	2.99%	New
Margin of victory		889	36.92%	
Turnout		2,408	65.70%	
Registered electors		3,816		
SPC win (new seat)				
