= O. T. Lepcha =

Indian politician

Ongden Tshering Lepcha

Member of Parliament, Rajya Sabha
- In office 24 February 2006 – 23 February 2012
- Preceded by: Palden Tsering Gyamtso
- Succeeded by: Hishey Lachungpa
- Constituency: Sikkim

Shri Ongden Tshering Lepcha a politician from Sikkim Democratic Front party is a former Member of the Parliament of India representing Sikkim in the Rajya Sabha, the upper house of the Parliament during 2006–2012.
