= 1985 Sikkim Legislative Assembly election =

1985 election of the Indian state assembly of Sikkim

← 1979	3 May 1985	1989 →

32 seats in the Sikkim Legislative Assembly 17 seats needed for a majority

	Majority party	Minority party
Leader	Nar Bahadur Bhandari	Kalzang Gyatso
Party	SSP	INC
Leader's seat	Soreng-Chakung	Kabi Tingda
Last election	16	0
Seats won	30	1
Seat change	▲14	▲1
Popular vote	60,371	23,440
Percentage	▲62.2%	▲24.15%
Chief Minister before election
President's Rule
Elected Chief Minister
Nar Bahadur Bhandari
SSP

Legislative Assembly elections were held in Sikkim in May 1985 to elect the 32 members of the third Legislative Assembly. The Sikkim Sangram Parishad won 30 seats in the Assembly and its leader, Nar Bahadur Bhandari became the Chief Minister for a second term.

== Parties Contested ==
No.	Party	Flag	Symbol	Leader	Seats contested
1	Sikkim Sangram Parishad			Nar Bahadur Bhandari	32
2	Indian National Congress			Rajiv Gandhi	32
3	Janata Party			Chandra Shekhar	20
4	Sikkim Prajatantra Congress				14
5	Communist Party of India			C. Rajeswara Rao	2
6	Communist Party of India			E. M. S. Namboodiripad	1
7	Independent			collective leadership	94

== Results ==
Party	Votes	%	Seats	+/–
Sikkim Sangram Parishad	60,371	62.20	30	▲14
Indian National Congress	23,440	24.15	1	▲1
Janata Party	913	0.94	0	0
Sikkim Prajatantra Congress	438	0.45	0	▼4
Communist Party of India (Marxist)	336	0.35	0	0
Communist Party of India	25	0.03	0	New
Independents	11,534	11.88	1	0
Total	97,057	100.00	32	0
Valid votes	97,057	97.61		
Invalid/blank votes	2,378	2.39		
Total votes	99,435	100.00		
Registered voters/turnout	155,041	64.13		
Source: ECI

=== Results by constituency ===
Winner, runner-up, voter turnout, and victory margin in every constituency
Assembly Constituency		Turnout	Winner				Runner Up				Margin
#k	Names	%	Candidate	Party	Votes	%	Candidate	Party	Votes	%	Margin
1	Yoksam	59.62%	Sancha Man Subba	SSP	1,535	48.15%	Shrijetha Subba	INC	546	17.13%	989
2	Tashiding	64.6%	Ugen Pritso Bhutia	SSP	1,586	63.29%	Dawgyal Pintso Bhutia	INC	643	25.66%	943
3	Geyzing	62.84%	Man Bahadur Dahal	SSP	1,702	52.56%	Dawa Norbu Kazi	Independent	689	21.28%	1,013
4	Dentam	66.51%	Padam Lall Gurung	SSP	2,355	74.41%	Laxmi Prasad Subba	INC	515	16.27%	1,840
5	Barmiok	71.74%	Birbal Subba	SSP	1,287	42.57%	Manita Prdhan	INC	1,216	40.22%	71
6	Rinchenpong	62.53%	Ongdi Bhutia	SSP	1,418	44.42%	Degay Bhutia	Independent	658	20.61%	760
7	Chakung	68.02%	Tara Man Rai	SSP	1,944	55.72%	Bhim Bahadur Gurung	INC	1,275	36.54%	669
8	Soreong	66.7%	Nar Bahadur Bhandari	SSP	2,964	79.1%	Durga Lama Pradhan	INC	633	16.89%	2,331
9	Daramdin	67.26%	Padam Bahadur Gurung	SSP	2,131	62.27%	Ram Bahadur Subba	INC	1,051	30.71%	1,080
10	Jorthang–Nayabazar	71.58%	Bhim Raj Rai	SSP	2,648	67.14%	Asharman Rai	INC	573	14.53%	2,075
11	Ralong	67.85%	Sonam Gyatso	SSP	1,697	65.42%	Kazi Lhendup Dorjee Khangsharpa	INC	576	22.21%	1,121
12	Wak	63.19%	Bedu Singh Chettri	SSP	1,704	67.49%	Chandra Das Rai	INC	638	25.27%	1,066
13	Damthang	64.45%	Pawan Kumar Chamling	SSP	2,281	72.07%	Pradeep Yonzong	INC	519	16.4%	1,762
14	Melli	69.67%	Dilliram Basnet	SSP	2,460	69.32%	Grish Chandra Rai	INC	814	22.94%	1,646
15	Rateypani–West Pendam	66.75%	Chandra Kumar Mohora	SSP	2,373	66.06%	Badri Thatal	INC	584	16.26%	1,789
16	Temi–Tarku	65.93%	Indra Bahadur Rai	SSP	2,048	67.84%	D. B. Basnet	INC	315	10.43%	1,733
17	Central Pendam–East Pendam	59.49%	Sukumar Pradhan	SSP	2,742	62.46%	B. Khrel	INC	1,406	32.03%	1,336
18	Rhenock	67.58%	Kharananda Upreti	SSP	1,809	58.49%	B. P. Dahal	INC	709	22.92%	1,100
19	Regu	64.72%	Tulshi Sharma	SSP	1,462	44.94%	Karna Bahadur	INC	913	28.07%	549
20	Pathing	67.57%	Ram Lepcha	SSP	2,407	71.66%	Sangay Dorjee Bhutia	INC	840	25.01%	1,567
21	Loosing Pachekhani	61.%	Bhakta Bahadur Khulal	SSP	1,787	66.53%	Ram Chandra Poudyal	INC	845	31.46%	942
22	Khamdong	66.22%	Birkha Man Ramudamu	SSP	2,834	79.36%	Purna Bahadur	INC	591	16.55%	2,243
23	Djongu	66.84%	Sonam Chyoda Lepcha	SSP	1,469	61.23%	Athup Lepcha	INC	765	31.89%	704
24	Lachen Mangshila	63.78%	Thokchok Bhutia	SSP	1,737	57.21%	Tenzing Dadul	INC	1,077	35.47%	660
25	Kabi Tingda	66.08%	Kalzang Gyatso	INC	1,102	45.76%	Geyching Bhutia	SSP	763	31.69%	339
26	Rakdong Tentek	63.82%	Phuchung Bhutia	SSP	1,829	61.4%	Sonam Tshering Bhutia	INC	566	19.%	1,263
27	Martam	71.32%	Chamla Tshering Bhutia	SSP	2,113	72.44%	Palden Wangchun	INC	646	22.15%	1,467
28	Rumtek	58.92%	Ongay Tob Shutia	SSP	1,933	60.69%	Rinzing Ongmo	INC	634	19.91%	1,299
29	Assam–Lingjey	67.16%	Sonam Dupden Lepcha	SSP	1,341	55.14%	Sherab Palden	INC	824	33.88%	517
30	Ranka	67.5%	Dorjee Tshering Bhutia	SSP	1,880	64.6%	Namgyal Topgay Bhutia	INC	920	31.62%	960
31	Gangtok	50.71%	Balchand Sarda	Independent	2,010	42.52%	Dil Kumari Bhandari	SSP	1,749	37.%	261
32	Sangha	31.88%	Namkha Gyaltsen	SSP	383	52.32%	Lachen Gomchen Rinpochi	INC	349	47.68%	34
