= Hishey Lachungpa =

Indian politician

Member of Parliament, Rajya Sabha
- In office 24 February 2012 – 23 February 2024
- Preceded by: O. T. Lepcha
- Succeeded by: Dorjee Tshering Lepcha
- Constituency: Sikkim

Member of Sikkim Legislative Assembly
- In office December 1994 – March 2009
- Preceded by: Tasa Tengey Lepcha
- Succeeded by: Constituency abolished
- Constituency: Lachen Mangshila

Personal details
- Born: 10 May 1967 (age 58) Phaka, Lachung, North Sikkim, Kingdom of Sikkim
- Party: Sikkim Democratic Front
- Spouse: Dr. Chongtick Lachungpa
- Children: One son and one daughter

Hishey Lachungpa (born 10 May 1967 at Phaka, Lachung, North Sikkim district, Sikkim) a politician from Sikkim Democratic Front party is a former member of the Parliament of India representing Sikkim in the Rajya Sabha, the upper house of the Indian Parliament for the term from February 2012 to February 2018 and February 2018 to February 2024.
