= Karma Topden =

Indian politician (1941–2018)

Karma Topden (1941 – 4 August 2018) was an Indian Sikkimese politician.

He was the son of Martam Topden who was a senior member of the Sikkim Legislative Assembly. He attended St Joseph's School in Darjeeling ('Northpoint') and later obtained a degree at Manchester University in the UK. He began his career as a police officer in Sikkim and subsequently became an administrative officer in the then ruler's office. After Sikkim became a State of India in 1975 he was taken into the Indian Administrative Service.

Topden held various senior posts in the Government of Sikkim until he was elected to the Upper House of the India Parliament, the Rajya Sabha, for two terms from 1988 to 1993 and 1994–2000. He was then appointed Indian Ambassador to Mongolia for two years.
