= 1989 Sikkim Legislative Assembly election =

1989 election of the Indian state assembly of Sikkim

- 26 November 1989

32 seats in the Sikkim Legislative Assembly 17 seats needed for a majority

	Majority party	Minority party
Leader	Nar Bahadur Bhandari
Party	SSP	INC
Leader's seat	Soreng-Chakung
Last election	30	1
Seats won	32	0
Seat change	▲2	▼1
Popular vote	94,078	24,121
Percentage	70.41%	18.05%
CM before election
Nar Bahadur Bhandari
SSP
Elected CM
Nar Bahadur Bhandari
SSP

Legislative Assembly elections were held in Sikkim in November 1989 to elect the 32 members of the fourth Legislative Assembly.

The Sikkim Sangram Parishad won all 32 seats in the Assembly and its leader, Nar Bahadur Bhandari became the Chief Minister for a third term.

== Parties Contested ==
No.	Party	Flag	Symbol	Leader	Seats contested
1.	Sikkim Sangram Parishad			Nar Bahadur Bhandari	32
2.	Indian National Congress			Rajiv Gandhi	31
3.	The Rising Sun Party				31
4.	Denzong People's Chogpi				4
5.	Independents			collective leadership	20

== Results ==
Sikkim Legislative Assembly 1989
Party	Votes	%	Seats	+/–
Sikkim Sangram Parishad	94,078	70.41	32	▲2
Indian National Congress	24,121	18.05	0	▼1
Rising Sun Party	11,472	8.59	0	New
Denzong Peoples Chogpi	298	0.22	0	New
Independents	3,650	2.73	0	▼1
Total	133,619	100.00	32	0
Valid votes	133,619	95.97		
Invalid/blank votes	5,608	4.03		
Total votes	139,227	100.00		
Registered voters/turnout	192,619	72.28		
Source: ECI

=== Results by constituency ===
Winner, runner-up, voter turnout, and victory margin in every constituency
Assembly Constituency		Turnout	Winner				Runner Up				Margin
#k	Names	%	Candidate	Party	Votes	%	Candidate	Party	Votes	%	Margin
1	Yoksam	60.11%	Sanchaman Subba	SSP	2,609	60.27%	Ashok Kumar Subba	INC	1,540	35.57%	1,069
2	Tashiding	67.12%	Ugen Pritso Bhutia	SSP	3,249	89.06%	Chewang Bhutia	INC	347	9.51%	2,902
3	Geyzing	67.75%	Man Bahadur Dahal	SSP	3,175	72.41%	Garjaman Subba	RIS	932	21.25%	2,243
4	Dentam	68.62%	Padam Lall Gurung	SSP	3,102	74.14%	Puspa Mani Chettri	RIS	566	13.53%	2,536
5	Barmiok	68.99%	Bir Bal Subba	SSP	2,624	69.25%	Ram Chandra Poudyal	RIS	1,001	26.42%	1,623
6	Rinchenpong	64.05%	Chong Lamu Bhutia	SSP	2,914	70.05%	Phur Tshering Lepcha	INC	1,011	24.3%	1,903
7	Chakung	67.62%	Tara Man Rai	SSP	3,804	83.27%	Rastaman Rai	Independent	550	12.04%	3,254
8	Soreong	69.99%	Nar Bahadur Bhandari	SSP	4,712	91.53%	Pahal Man Subba	INC	400	7.77%	4,312
9	Daramdin	68.32%	Padam Bahadur Gurung	SSP	3,745	77.94%	Ram Bahadur Limbu	INC	957	19.92%	2,788
10	Jorthang–Nayabazar	71.86%	Bhim Raj Rai	SSP	4,023	76.11%	Rajan Gurung	INC	1,062	20.09%	2,961
11	Ralong	66.73%	Sonam Gyatso Kaleon	SSP	2,903	89.74%	Dorjee Dazom Bhutia	INC	291	9.%	2,612
12	Wak	62.94%	Bedu Singh Panth	SSP	2,930	88.63%	Suk Bahadur Rai	INC	231	6.99%	2,699
13	Damthang	70.21%	Pawan Kumar Chamling	SSP	4,227	94.27%	Suraj Kumar Khartan	INC	257	5.73%	3,970
14	Melli	70.17%	Dilliram Basnet	SSP	3,400	75.69%	Girish Chandra Rai	Independent	627	13.96%	2,773
15	Rateypani–West Pendam	65.74%	Chandra Kumar Mohora	SSP	3,401	75.21%	Madhukar Darjee	INC	603	13.33%	2,798
16	Temi–Tarku	65.71%	I. B. Rai	SSP	3,091	75.1%	Badrinath Pradhan	Independent	707	17.18%	2,384
17	Central Pendam–East Pendam	72.49%	Sukumar Pradhan	SSP	3,168	58.85%	Yoga Nidhi Bhandari	RIS	1,817	33.75%	1,351
18	Rhenock	75.08%	Kharananda Upreti	SSP	2,295	60.27%	Kiran Chettri	INC	1,271	33.38%	1,024
19	Regu	77.68%	Rajendra Prasad Uprety	SSP	2,479	57.69%	Karna Bahadur	INC	1,558	36.26%	921
20	Pathing	73.54%	Ram Lepcha	SSP	3,225	68.75%	Sangey Dorjee	INC	1,360	28.99%	1,865
21	Loosing Pachekhani	73.78%	Rup Raj Rai	SSP	1,859	52.26%	Ram Chandra Poudyal	RIS	1,566	44.03%	293
22	Khamdong	66.35%	Birkha Man Ramudamu	SSP	3,330	71.26%	Ganga Darjee	RIS	973	20.82%	2,357
23	Djongu	77.52%	Sonam Chyoda Lepcha	SSP	2,322	73.02%	Athup Lepcha	INC	810	25.47%	1,512
24	Lachen Mangshila	71.%	Tasa Tengey Lepcha	SSP	2,452	68.09%	Nimching Lepcha	INC	1,032	28.66%	1,420
25	Kabi Tingda	73.37%	Hangu Tshering Bhutia	SSP	1,806	58.05%	Kalzang Gyatso	INC	1,268	40.76%	538
26	Rakdong Tentek	72.76%	Phuchung Bhutia	SSP	2,650	65.74%	Rinzing Tongden	RIS	1,230	30.51%	1,420
27	Martam	73.75%	Chamla Tshering Bhutia	SSP	1,968	49.37%	Samten Tshering	INC	1,118	28.05%	850
28	Rumtek	72.29%	O. T. Bhutia	SSP	3,126	65.29%	Sonam Pintso Wangdi	INC	1,377	28.76%	1,749
29	Assam–Lingjey	78.14%	Sonam Dupden Lepcha	SSP	2,359	61.72%	Sherab Palden	INC	1,184	30.98%	1,175
30	Ranka	73.27%	Dorjee Tshering Bhutia	SSP	2,909	61.81%	Sonam Tshering Lepcha	INC	1,644	34.93%	1,265
31	Gangtok	66.47%	Manita Pradhan	SSP	3,415	56.4%	Dilli Prasad Dhungel	INC	2,494	41.19%	921
32	Sangha	45.8%	Nanjha Gyaltsen	SSP	806	54.72%	Bazing	Independent	422	28.65%	384
