= Palden Tsering Gyamtso =

Indian politician

Palden Tsering Gyamtso is an Indian politician from Sikkim.

He was elected to Upper House of India Parliament - the Rajya Sabha for the term 2000-2006 from Sikkim Democratic Front.
