= Sikkim Himali Rajya Parishad =

Indian political party

SHRP symbol

The Sikkim Himali Rajya Parishad (translation: Sikkim Himalayan State Association) was a political party in the Indian state of Sikkim. Dr. A.D. Subba was the party president and Tara Shrestha its general secretary.

In February 2004 SHRP, together with Indian National Congress, Bharatiya Janata Party, Communist Party of India (Marxist), Organization of Sikkimese Unity (OSU), Sikkim Gorkha Party (SGP), Sikkim Gorkha Prajatantrik Party (SGPP), Sikkim National Liberation Front (SNLF), Nepali Bhutia Lepcha (NEBULA), and Gorkha National Liberation Front, formed a joint political front.

In the 2004 parliamentary election SHRP contested the sole Lok Sabha seat in Sikkim. The party candidate, Tara Kumar Pradhan, came fourth with 2765 votes (1.26%).

In 2008, the party spoke out against a proposal to merge Sikkim with Darjeeling.
