= Rising Sun Party =

Indian political party

- Leader: Ram Chandra Poudyal
- Founder: Ram Chandra Poudyal
- Split from: Sikkim Congress (Revolutionary)
- ECI Status: unrecognized party
- Seats in Lok Sabha: 0 / 543
- Seats in Sikkim Legislative Assembly: 0 / 32

Rising Sun Party (RIS) was a political party in the Indian state of Sikkim. The founder and president was Ram Chandra Poudyal (R. C. Poudyal) who was one of the leaders from Sikkim Congress (Revolutionary).

In the 1989 Sikkim Legislative Assembly election and Sikkim Lok Sabha election, RIS was one of the main rivals for the ruling party, Sikkim Sangram Parishad (SSP). But in this Legislative Assembly election, RIS couldn’t win any seat and received only 8.59% (8.88% in seats contested) votes. In the Lok Sabha election, R. C. Powdyal stood as the candidate of RIS, but he lost and couldn’t refund his deposit of candidacy.

Since 1990, RIS didn’t participate any election in Sikkim, and it isn’t registered in the list of political parties in Sikkim by Election Commission of India (ECI).

== Electoral records ==
Sikkim Legislative Assembly election

Year	Total Seats	Seats Contested	Seats Won	Forfeited Deposits	% Votes Contested	Source
1989	32	31	0	25	8.88	

Lok Sabha election, Sikkim

Year	Total Seats	Seats Contested	Seats Won	Forfeited Deposits	% Votes Contested	Source
1989	1	0	0	1	9.62	
