= Sikkim Congress (Revolutionary) =

Sikkim Congress (Revolutionary) was a political party in the Indian state of Sikkim in 1979–1981. The president of the party was Ram Chandra Poudyal. In the state assembly elections of 1979, SCR(R) won eleven seats (of 32) and became the largest faction in the assembly. In total, the party received 14,889 votes (20.58% of the votes in the state). The strength of the party did however decline when several assembly members crossed over to Sikkim Prajatantra Congress.

In the Lok Sabha elections of 1980, the SC(R) candidate won 11,632 votes (22.59% of the votes in Sikkim).

== Electoral records ==
=== Sikkim Legislative Assembly ===
Year	Total Seats	Seats Contested	Seats Won	Forfeited Deposits	% Votes contested	Source
1979	32	27	11	11	23.38	

=== Lok Sabha election, Sikkim ===
Year	Total Seats	Seats Contested	Seats Won	Forfeited Deposits	% Votes contested	Source
1980	1	1	0	0	22.59	
