= Sikkim Janata Parishad =

Former Indian political party

Sikkim Janata Parishad or SJP (Sikkim Popular Association) was a political party in the Indian state of Sikkim led by N.B. Bhandari.

SJP won the 1979 state assembly elections, when it got 22,776 votes (31,49%) and won 17 seats (had nominated candidates in 31 out of the total 32 constituencies). Bhandari became the Chief Minister.

In 1981 SJP merged with Indian National Congress. However, in 1984 Bhandari split from Congress and founded Sikkim Sangram Parishad.

== Electoral records ==
Sikkim Legislative Assembly election

Year	Total Seats	Seats Contested	Seats Won	Forfeited Deposits	% Votes contested	Source
1979	32	31	16	4	31.83	

Lok Sabha election, Sikkim

Year	Total Seats	Seats Contested	Seats Won	Forfeited Deposits	% Votes contested	Source
1980	1	1	1	0	61.65	
