= Sikkim Prajatantra Congress =

Political party in Sikkim, India

Sikkim Prajatantra Congress (Sikkim Democratic Congress) is a political party in the Indian state of Sikkim. Pawan Chamling, the current leader of Sikkim Democratic Front and Sikkim Chief Minister, was the treasurer of SPC 1978–1984. In the 1979 state assembly elections, SPC had nominated candidates in all 32 constituencies, and won four seats. The party got 11,400 votes (15,76%).

In the 1985 state assembly elections SPC had launched 14 candidates, whom together only mustered 438 votes. By that time Chamling had crossed over to Sikkim Sangram Parishad.

== Electoral records ==
Sikkim Legislative Assembly election

Year	Total Seats	Seats Contested	Seats Won	Forfeited Deposits	% Votes contested	Source
1979	32	32	4	19	15.76	
1985	32	14	0	14	0.99	

Lok Sabha election, Sikkim

Year	Total Seats	Seats Contested	Seats Won	Forfeited Deposits	% Votes contested	Source
1980	1	1	0	1	9.95	
