= Political parties in Sikkim =

== Major national-level parties ==
- Indian National Congress (INC)
- Bharatiya Janata Party (BJP) Sikkim Unit

== Major regional parties ==
- Sikkim Krantikari Morcha (SKM)
- Sikkim Democratic Front (SDF)

== Minor regional parties ==
- Sikkim Progressive Alliance (SPA)
  - Sikkim Sangram Parishad (SSP)
  - Sikkim Rajya Manch Party (SRMP) led by Rup Narayan Chamling
  - Sikkim National People’s Party (SNPP) led by Delay Namgyal Barfungpa
  - Sikkim United Front Party (SUFP) led by Narendra Adhikari
- Hamro Sikkim Party (HSP)
- Organization of Sikkimese Unity (OSU)
- Sikkim Independent Front (SIF)
- Sikkim Gorkha Party (SGP)
- Sikkim Scheduled Caste League (SSCL)
- Sikkim Republican Party (SRP)
- Sikkim National Liberation Front (SNLF)
- Sikkim Gorkha Prajatantrik Party (SGPP)
- Gorkha National Liberation Front (GNLF)
- Citizen Action Party – Sikkim (CAP-Sikkim)

== Defunct parties ==
- Sikkim National Party
- Rajya Praja Sammelan (RPS) {merged with Sikkim National Congress in 1962}
- Sikkim Swatantra Dal (SSD) {merged with Sikkim National Congress in 1962}
- Sikkim State Congress (SSC) {merged with Sikkim Janata Congress in 1972}
- Sikkim Janata Party (SJP) {merged with Sikkim Janata Congress in 1972}
- Sikkim Janata Congress (SJC) {merged with Sikkim National Congress in 1973}
- Sikkim National Congress (SNC) {merged with Indian National Congress in 1975}
- Sikkim Janata Parishad (SJP) {merged with Indian National Congress in 1982}
- Sikkim Congress (Revolutionary) (SCR)
- Sikkim Himali Congress (SHC)
- Sikkim Prajatantra Congress (SPC)
- Rising Sun Party (RIS)
- Sikkim Ekta Manch (SEM) {merged with Indian National Congress in 1998}
- Sikkim Janashakti Party (SJP) {merged with Indian National Congress in 1999}
- Nepali Bhutia Lepcha (NEBULA) {merged with Trinamool Congress in 2013}
- Sikkim Himali Rajya Parishad (SHRP) {merged with Indian National Congress in 2014}
