= Nahakul Pradhan =

Indian politician

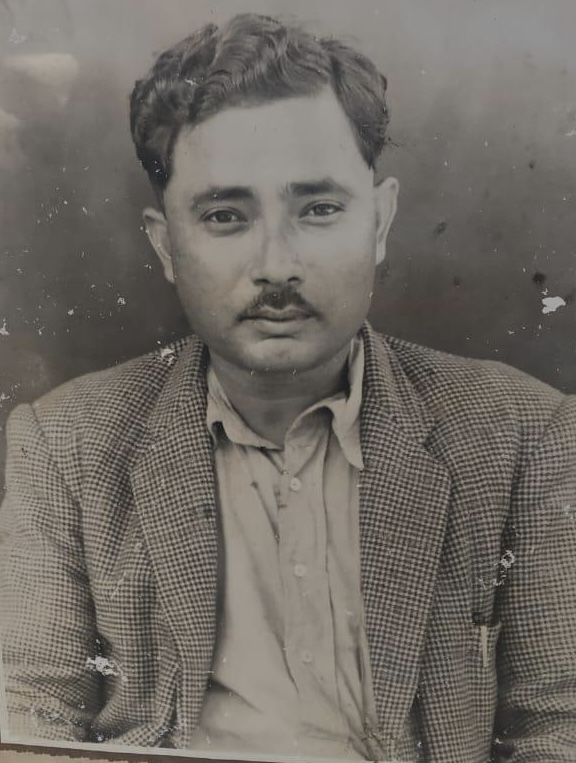

Executive Council of Sikkim
- In office 1958–1973
- Monarchs: Tashi Namgyal, Palden Thondup Namgyal

Member of the Sikkim State Council
- In office 1953–1958
- Constituency: Pemayangtse
- In office 1958–1967
- Constituency: North-Central
- In office 1967–1973
- Constituency: East

Personal details
- Party: Sikkim State Congress; Sikkim Janata Congress

Nahakul Pradhan (born 1918 - 17 June 1973) also known as Nakul Pradhan was a Sikkimese pre-merger politician, pro-democracy leader, a member of the Sikkim State Council and Executive Council of Sikkim serving multiple terms. He was the President of the Sikkim State Congress party and the Editor of Sikkim’s first news magazine Kanchenjunga.

== Early life ==
He was born into an aristocratic family of Sikkimese Newar Taksaris, his mother Kanti Pradhan was the grand daughter of Taksari Chandrabir Maskey of Pakyong, who was the Thikadar (Sikkimese feudal lord) of many estates in the former Kingdom of Sikkim. He was a nephew of senior political leader Kashiraj Pradhan of whom his mother was a twin sister. He has four sons and four daughters, the eldest son is Late S.K.Pradhan, a former MLA of the Sikkim Legislative Assembly. Journalist Nitesh R Pradhan is his grandson.

== Career ==
He joined in the Indian army in 1939 with active service in West Asia, Italy and Ladakh. He was released from the army in 1949. Thereafter, he joined politics following the path of his maternal uncle Kashiraj Pradhan. He joined the Sikkim State Congress actively taking part in the first struggle for democracy in the year 1949 which led to formation of the first interim government in the erstwhile kingdom of Sikkim headed by Congress Chief Tashi Tshering. In 1953, he was elected as a member in the first ever held Sikkimese general election for the State Council of Sikkim. Thereafter he served in office for many terms till 1973. He also served in Executive Council(equivalent to cabinet) holding the portfolios of Public Works, Excise, Bazaar, Health and Medical departments for multiple terms in the Chogyal regime.

In 1967, he took over the leadership of the Sikkim State Congress from his uncle Kashiraj Pradhan. Initially he demanded Sikkim’s merger with India in view of tensions with China on Sikkimese borders. In a change to his previous ideological stand of Sikkim’s merger with India, in 1967, Pradhan along with BB Gurung and Netuk Tshering demanded revision of Indo-Sikkim treaty,1950 stating, "Since Sikkim signed the treaty with India, surely it is within her sovereign rights to demand a revision of the treaty as one of the signatories. In fact, Sikkim gained her Sovereign Status on the 15th August, 1947, when India achieved her independence from the British rule. Every country has its inherent right to exist and maintain its separate identity and, therefore, to review and revise its treaty obligations in the wake of changing circumstances."

By late 1950s to the 1970s the Sikkim State Congress was led by him or his uncle Kashiraj Pradhan both serving as President of the party alternatively. Under their leadership the party greatly moderated it’s anti-Chogyal stand and participated in the Royal Sikkimese administration through subsequent wins in elections to the State Council

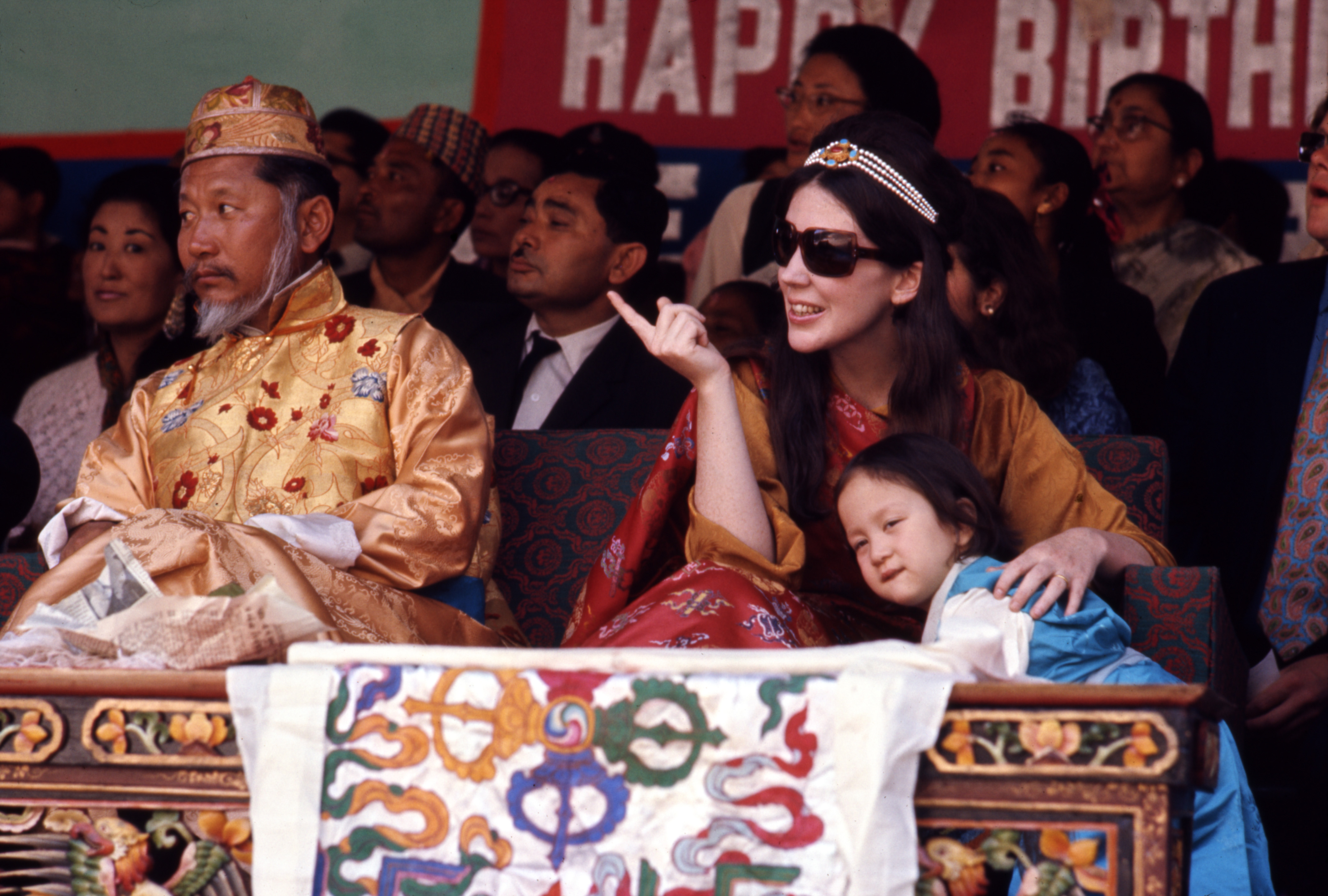
Nahakul Pradhan seen in background alongside King and Queen of Sikkim and their daughter at Chogyal’s birthday celebrations, Gangtok, Sikkim

By the 1970s, Pradhan led Sikkim State Congress demanded for a responsible government under the Chogyal opposing the demands of Kazi Lhendup Dorjee led Sikkim National Congress.

A new party Sikkim Janata Congress was formed in 1972 after the merger of his party Sikkim State Congress with Sikkim Janata Party. However, in 1973 Sikkimese general election his party only won two seats amid allegations of vote rigging in South Sikkim in which Sikkim National Party emerged as the single largest party due to inequalities of the electoral system. Further, Pradhan also lost his seat to L. D. Kazi. However the two main opposition Kazi led Sikkim National Congress and Sikkim Janata Congress boycotted the Executive Council and began fresh agitation for electoral reforms under "One Man One Vote" principle. Chogyal arrested Janata Congress President KC Pradhan on 27 March 1973. This led to mass protests against the Chogyal in Gangtok. A Joint Action Committee(JAC) was formed between Sikkim National Congress and Sikkim Janata Congress intensifying the agitation in Sikkim. During this, the three senior most leaders of JAC Pradhan, Kazi Lhendup Dorjee and B. B. Gurung were given shelter at the office of Indian Political Officer.

He died suddenly after a cardiac arrest on 17 June 1973 at a peak of the agitation for democratic change in Sikkim. His death was mourned by the Indian Political Officer K.S. Bajpayee, B. B. Gurung, Kazi Lhendup Dorjee and many other leaders of Sikkim.

== Other work ==
He was the editor of Sikkim's first monthly news magazine Kanchenjunga(1957), which his maternal uncle Kashiraj Pradhan started.

== Positions held ==
- 1953-58 - Member - State Council of Sikkim
- 1958-67 - Deputy Executive Councillor - State Council of Sikkim
- 1967-70 - Executive Councillor(Incharge of Public Works, Excise and Bazar departments) - State Council of Sikkim
- 1970-73 - Executive Councillor(Incharge of Health & Medical departments) - State Council of Sikkim

== Honours ==
- 1965 - Pema Dorji Decoration - Presented by the Chogyal of Sikkim, the third highest civilian honour in the former Kingdom of Sikkim.
- 1998 - Swatantrata Senani Tamra-Patra (Posthumous) by the State Government of Sikkim for contribution to establishment of democracy.
- The Government of Sikkim has named Central Pendam - Rangpo road as Nahakul Pradhan Marg.

== Sources ==
- Bareh, Hamlet (2001). "Introduction". Encyclopaedia of North-East India: Sikkim. Mittal Publications. ISBN 978-81-7099-794-8.
