= 1974 Sikkimese general election =

- 13 April 1974

All 32 seats in the State Council 17 seats needed for a majority
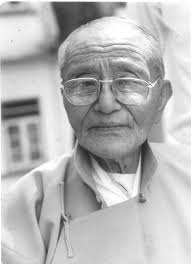

	Majority party	Minority party
Leader	Kazi Lhendup Dorjee
Party	SNC	SNP
Leader's seat	Tashiding
Last election	5	9
Seats won	31	1
Seat change	▲26	▼8
Elected CM
Kazi Lhendup Dorjee
SNC

General elections were held in the Kingdom of Sikkim on 13 April 1974. They were the first elections in Sikkim to be held on the basis of universal suffrage, and also the last prior to the Indian annexation of the kingdom. The result was a victory for the Sikkim National Congress, which won 31 of the 32 seats in the State Council. Kazi Lhendup Dorjee subsequently became Chief Minister. In May 1975 Sikkim became a state of India, at which point the State Council became the Sikkim Legislative Assembly.

== Background ==
In the 1973 elections the Sikkim National Party won nine seats out of eighteen elected seats in the 24-seat Sikkim State Council. The Sikkim National Congress and Sikkim Janata Congress claimed there had been vote rigging, leading to protests. Political parties and members of the public demanded one man, one vote. On 8 May 1973 a tripartite agreement was signed between the Chogyal Palden Thondup Namgyal, political parties and the government of India. The agreement provided for the establishment of a responsible government under the supervision of a Chief Executive nominated by the Indian government.

== Electoral system ==
Through the Representations of Sikkim Subjects Act, 1974, the Chogyal divided Sikkim into 31 territorial constituencies and one Sangha constituency. The 31 territorial constituencies were allocated as 15 for Nepalis, 15 for the Bhutia-Lepcha and one for scheduled castes, under a parity formula. The Sangha constituency represented Chogyal-recognized monasteries.

== Campaign ==
The Sikkim National Congress contested all the 32 seats, whilst the Sikkim National Party contested five seats. Elections were held with the support of Election Commission of India.

== Results ==
Party	Seats	+/–
Sikkim National Congress	31	+26
Sikkim National Party	1	–8
Total	32	+8
Source: Sikkim Assembly Website

=== Constituency-wise ===
#	Constituency	Reserved for	Winner	Party
1	Yoksam	BL	Degay Bhutia	Sikkim National Congress
2	Tashiding	BL	Kazi Lhendup Dorjee	Sikkim National Congress
3	Geyzing	Nepalis	Kumari Hemlata Chettri	Sikkim National Congress
4	Dentam	Nepalis	Narbahadur Khatiwada	Sikkim National Congress
5	Barmiok	Nepalis	Nanda Kumar Subedi	Sikkim National Congress
6	Rinchenpong	BL	Nayen Tshering Lepcha	Sikkim National Congress
7	Chakung	Nepalis	B. B. Gurung	Sikkim National Congress
8	Soreong	Nepalis	Chatur Singh Rai	Sikkim National Congress
9	Daramdin	Nepalis	Krishna Bahadur Limboo	Sikkim National Congress
10	Jorethang-Nayabazar	Nepalis	Krishna Chandra Pradhan	Sikkim National Congress
11	Ralang	BL	Passang Tshering Bhutia	Sikkim National Congress
12	Wak	BL	Adar Singh Lepcha	Sikkim National Congress
13	Damthang	Nepalis	Ratna Bijay Rai	Sikkim National Congress
14	Melli	Nepalis	Nanda Bahadur Rai	Sikkim National Congress
15	Rateypani West	Nepalis	Pendam Bhuwani Prasad Kharel	Sikkim National Congress
16	Temi–Tarku	Nepalis	Badri Nath Pradhan	Sikkim National Congress
17	Central Pendam-East Pendam	Nepalis	Kehar Singh Karki	Sikkim National Congress
18	Rhenock	Nepalis	Bhawani Prasad Dahal	Sikkim National Congress
19	Regu	Nepalis	Mohan Gurung	Sikkim National Congress
20	Pathing	BL	Sonpom Lepcha	Sikkim National Congress
21	Loosing-Pachekhani	Nepalis	R. C. Poudyal	Sikkim National Congress
22	Khamdong	SC	Kusu Das	Sikkim National Congress
23	Djongu	BL	Loden Tsering Lepcha	Sikkim National Congress
24	Lachen-Mangshila	BL	Tasa Tengay Lepcha	Sikkim National Congress
25	Kabi-Tingda	BL	Kalzang Gyatso Bhutia	Sikkim National Party
26	Rakdong-Tentek	BL	Rinzing Tongden Lepcha	Sikkim National Congress
27	Martam	BL	Shepochung Bhutia	Sikkim National Congress
28	Rumtek	BL	Phigu Tshering Bhutia	Sikkim National Congress
29	Assam-Lingjey	BL	Dugo Bhutia	Sikkim National Congress
30	Ranka	BL	Nim Tshering Lepcha	Sikkim National Congress
31	Gangtok	BL	Dorjee Tshering Bhutia	Sikkim National Congress
32	Sangha	Sangha	Karma Gonpo Lama	Sikkim National Congress
Source: Sikkim Darbar Gazette

== Council of Ministers ==
The Chogyal appointed the Council of Ministers on 23 July.

Name	Role
Kazi Lhendup Dorjee	Chief Minister
Rinzing Tongden Lepcha	Minister
Bhawani Prasad Dahal	Minister
Dorjee Tshering Bhutia	Minister
Krishna Chandra Pradhan	Minister
