= 2014 Sikkim Legislative Assembly election =

2014 election of the Indian state assembly of Sikkim

- 12 April 2014

All 32 seats in the Sikkim Legislative Assembly 17 seats needed for a majority
- Turnout: 80.97% ▼2.91%
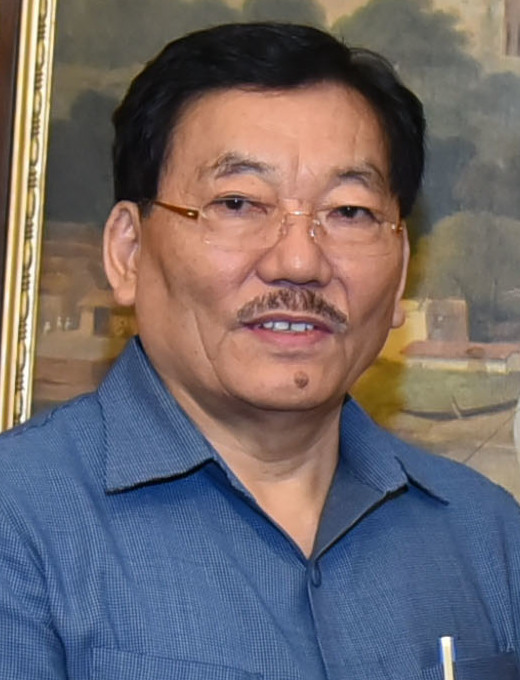

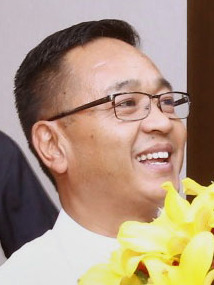
| | Majority party | Minority party |
|---|---|---|
| Leader | Pawan Kumar Chamling | Prem Singh Tamang |
| Party | SDF | SKM |
| Leader since | 1994 | 2014 |
| Leader's seat | Namchi-Singhithang, Rangang-Yangang | Upper Burtuk, Namthang-Rateypani (lost) |
| Last election | 32 | New |
| Seats won | 22 | 10 |
| Seat change | ▼10 | New |
| Popular vote | 169,986 | 126,024 |
| Percentage | 55.0% | 40.8% |
| Swing | ▼10.9% | New |
Chief Minister before election
Pawan Kumar Chamling
SDF
Elected Chief Minister
Pawan Chamling
SDF

The election was held on 12 April 2014 for 9th assembly of Sikkim, the northeastern state of India. It elected 32 members of Sikkim Legislative Assembly.

== Background ==
Pawan Chamling-led SDF had already formed the previous four governments in Sikkim having first formed the government after the 1994 election, when they won 19 seats within a year of the party being formed, and then again after the 1999 election, when they increased their tally to 24 seats. Chamling's third term began on 21 May 2004 after increasing his tally to 31. In the 2009 Sikkim Legislative Assembly election, the SDF had a clean-sweep winning all 32 seats in the state assembly and Chamling was sworn in as a Chief Minister fourth times on 20 May 2009. SDF was contesting for the fifth consecutive term.

== Campaign and issues ==
The Buddhist minority demanded Karmapa to contest from Rumtek monastery. The Nepali community in Sikkim demanded tribal status.

Sikkim Krantikari Morcha (SKM) was formed by Prem Singh Tamang in February 2013. Prem Singh Tamang alias P S Golay left Chamling's SDF in September 2014 and joined SKM. SKM contested from all 32 seats.

== Schedule of election ==
| Poll Event | Dates |
|---|---|
| Announcement & Issue of Press Note | 5 March 2014 |
| Issue of Notification | 19 March 2014 |
| Last Date for filing Nominations | 26 March 2014 |
| Scrutiny of Nominations | 27 March 2014 |
| Last date for withdrawal of Candidature | 29 March 2014 |
| Date of Poll | 12 April 2014 |
| Counting of Votes on | 16 May 2014 |
| Date before which election shall be completed | 20 May 2014 |
| Constituencies Polling on this day | 32 |
Source: Election Commission of India

== Polling ==
There were 370,731 eligible voters including 179,650 female voters. 538 polling stations were set up by election commission which were guarded by 3500 policemen and 15 companies of the West Bengal Police. There are two seats reserved for Scheduled Castes (SC), 12 for Bhutia-Lepcha (BL) communities out of 32 seats. One seat (Sangha) is reserved for 2900 monks of over 100 monasteries.

SKM leader Golay contested from Namthang-Rateypani seat against incumbent SDF minister Tilu Gurung.

SDF leader and incumbent chief minister Chamling contested from two places, Namchi-Singhithang and Rangang-Yangang.

=== Voter turnout ===
Total 80.97% of electorate including 80.57% males and 81.40% females cast their vote.

Voter turnout at each constituency was as below:

| No. | Constituency | Voter turnout % |
|---|---|---|
| 1 | Yoksam- Tashiding (BL) | 84.66 |
| 2 | Yangthang | 82.18 |
| 3 | Maneybong Dentam | 83.59 |
| 4 | Gyalshing Barnyak | 82.19 |
| 5 | Rinchenpong | 84.73 |
| 6 | Daramdin | 82.34 |
| 7 | Soreng Chakung | 83.52 |
| 8 | Salghari Zoom (SC) | 82.61 |
| 9 | Barfung (BL) | 83.37 |
| 10 | Poklok Kamrang | 84.16 |
| 11 | Namchi Singhithang | 76.87 |
| 12 | Melli | 82.16 |
| 13 | Namthang Rateypani | 81.64 |
| 14 | Temi Namphing | 81.33 |
| 15 | Rangang Yangang | 82.53 |
| 16 | Tumin Lingee (BL) | 82.66 |
| 17 | Khamdong Singtam | 82.32 |
| 18 | West Pendam (SC) | 81.15 |
| 19 | Rhenok | 82.02 |
| 20 | Chujachen | 80.44 |
| 21 | Gnathang Machong (BL) | 81.40 |
| 22 | Namchwybong | 82.42 |
| 23 | Shyari (BL) | 78.14 |
| 24 | Martam Rumtek (BL) | 80.23 |
| 25 | Upper Tadong | 73.54 |
| 26 | Arithang | 71.14 |
| 27 | Gangtok (BL) | 65.94 |
| 28 | Upper Burtuk | 78.77 |
| 29 | Kabi Lungchuk (BL) | 80.37 |
| 30 | Djongu (BL) | 86.49 |
| 31 | Lachen Mangan (BL) | 82.72 |
| 32 | Sangha | 74.62 |
| | Total | 80.97 |

== Parties contested ==
| Party Type | Code | Party name | Number of candidates | Total |
|---|---|---|---|---|
| National Parties | BJP | Bharatiya Janata Party | 13 | 45 |
| National Parties | INC | Indian National Congress | 32 | 45 |
| State registered and recognized parties | SDF | Sikkim Democratic Front | 32 | 32 |
| State registered and unrecognised parties | TMC | Trinamool Congress | 7 | 39 |
| State registered and unrecognised parties | SKM | Sikkim Krantikari Morcha | 32 | 39 |
| Independents | n/a | Independents | 5 | 5 |
| Total: | | | | 121 |

== Results ==
Votes were counted and results were declared on 16 May 2014. SDF lost 10 seats to SKM resulting in formation of opposition in the assembly which did not exist in previous assembly.

| Party | Votes | % | Seats | +/– |
|---|---|---|---|---|
| Sikkim Democratic Front | 169,986 | 55.03 | 22 | –10 |
| Sikkim Krantikari Morcha | 126,024 | 40.80 | 10 | New |
| Indian National Congress | 4,390 | 1.42 | 0 | 0 |
| Bharatiya Janata Party | 2,208 | 0.71 | 0 | 0 |
| Trinamool Congress | 586 | 0.19 | 0 | 0 |
| Independents | 1,227 | 0.40 | 0 | 0 |
| None of the above | 4,460 | 1.44 | – | – |
| Total | 308,881 | 100.00 | 32 | 0 |
| Valid votes | 308,881 | 99.60 | | |
| Invalid/blank votes | 1,254 | 0.40 | | |
| Total votes | 310,135 | 100.00 | | |
| Registered voters/turnout | 370,770 | 83.65 | | |
Source: CEO Sikkim

=== Results by constituency ===
Winner, runner-up, voter turnout, and victory margin in every constituency
| Assembly Constituency | | Turnout | Winner | | | | Runner Up | | | | Margin |
| #k | Names | % | Candidate | Party | Votes | % | Candidate | Party | Votes | % | Margin |
|---|---|---|---|---|---|---|---|---|---|---|---|
| 1 | Yoksam–Tashiding | 86.02% | Sonam Dadul Bhutia | SDF | 6,777 | 68.33% | Thutop Bhutia | SKM | 2,559 | 25.8% | 4,218 |
| 2 | Yangthang | 84.48% | Chandra Maya Limboo (Subba) | SDF | 5,211 | 56.% | Kharka Bahadur Subba | SKM | 3,572 | 38.39% | 1,639 |
| 3 | Maneybong–Dentam | 85.79% | Narendra Kumar Subba | SDF | 7,737 | 72.43% | Birbal Tamling | SKM | 2,519 | 23.58% | 5,218 |
| 4 | Gyalshing–Barnyak | 85.06% | Sher Bahadur Subedi | SDF | 4,529 | 50.86% | Lok Nath Sharma | SKM | 3,890 | 43.68% | 639 |
| 5 | Rinchenpong | 85.86% | Karma Sonam Lepcha | SDF | 7,347 | 68.37% | Pema Kinzang Bhutia | SKM | 2,891 | 26.9% | 4,456 |
| 6 | Daramdin | 84.65% | Danorbu Sherpa | SDF | 6,250 | 54.89% | Mingma Narbu Sherpa | SKM | 4,646 | 40.8% | 1,604 |
| 7 | Soreng–Chakung | 85.47% | Ram Bahadur Subba | SDF | 6,596 | 55.4% | Bharati Sharma | SKM | 4,667 | 39.2% | 1,929 |
| 8 | Salghari–Zoom | 83.7% | Arjun Kumar Ghatani | SDF | 4,250 | 52.63% | Bhanu Pratap Rasaily | SKM | 3,471 | 42.98% | 779 |
| 9 | Barfung | 84.73% | Dorjee Dazom Bhutia | SDF | 6,639 | 63.79% | Pema Wangyal Bhutia | SKM | 3,460 | 33.24% | 3,179 |
| 10 | Poklok–Kamrang | 86.18% | Kedar Nath Rai | SDF | 7,996 | 68.85% | Bhoj Raj Rai | SKM | 3,325 | 28.63% | 4,671 |
| 11 | Namchi–Singhithang | 79.87% | Pawan Kumar Chamling | SDF | 4,774 | 55.08% | Milan Rai | SKM | 3,690 | 42.57% | 1,084 |
| 12 | Melli | 84.57% | Tulshi Devi Rai | SDF | 7,655 | 67.32% | Prem Bahadur Karki | SKM | 3,406 | 29.95% | 4,249 |
| 13 | Namthang–Rateypani | 83.53% | Tilu Gurung | SDF | 5,947 | 53.84% | Prem Singh Tamang | SKM | 4,792 | 43.38% | 1,155 |
| 14 | Temi–Namphing | 83.75% | Garjaman Gurung | SDF | 5,657 | 55.38% | Lalit Sharma | SKM | 4,268 | 41.78% | 1,389 |
| 15 | Rangang–Yangang | 84.48% | Pawan Kumar Chamling | SDF | 6,343 | 63.84% | Bikash Basnet | SKM | 3,201 | 32.22% | 3,142 |
| 16 | Tumin–Lingee | 84.88% | Ugyen Tshering Gyatso Bhutia | SDF | 7,191 | 62.26% | Nidup Tshering Lepcha | SKM | 3,999 | 34.62% | 3,192 |
| 17 | Khamdong–Singtam | 83.92% | Somnath Poudyal | SDF | 4,718 | 49.13% | Dr. Mani Kumar Sharma | SKM | 4,448 | 46.31% | 270 |
| 18 | West Pendam | 82.63% | Gopal Baraily | SKM | 5,382 | 52.45% | K. K. Thatal | SDF | 4,462 | 43.49% | 920 |
| 19 | Rhenock | 84.47% | Hemendra Adhikari | SKM | 6,415 | 50.05% | Bhim Prasad Dhungel | SDF | 5,461 | 42.6% | 954 |
| 20 | Chujachen | 83.09% | Bikram Pradhan | SDF | 7,836 | 60.98% | Kharga Bahadur Gurung | SKM | 4,425 | 34.44% | 3,411 |
| 21 | Gnathang–Machong | 85.51% | Dorjee Tshering Lepcha | SDF | 5,017 | 58.21% | Sonam Dorjee | SKM | 3,101 | 35.98% | 1,916 |
| 22 | Namchaybong | 85.19% | Bek Bahadur Rai | SDF | 5,577 | 50.72% | Dilip Rai | SKM | 4,955 | 45.07% | 622 |
| 23 | Shyari | 80.76% | Kunga Nima Lepcha | SKM | 5,324 | 52.23% | Karma Tempo Namgyal Gyaltsen | SDF | 4,588 | 45.01% | 736 |
| 24 | Martam–Rumtek | 83.06% | Mechung Bhutia | SKM | 6,055 | 50.24% | Menlom Lepcha | SDF | 5,576 | 46.26% | 479 |
| 25 | Upper Tadong | 76.6% | Timothy William Basnett | SKM | 3,333 | 48.61% | Bhasker Basnett | SDF | 3,211 | 46.83% | 122 |
| 26 | Arithang | 73.22% | Shyam Pradhan | SKM | 4,026 | 57.92% | Udai Lama | SDF | 2,420 | 34.82% | 1,606 |
| 27 | Gangtok | 68.17% | Pintso Chopel | SKM | 4,208 | 61.28% | Hishey Lachungpa | SDF | 2,317 | 33.74% | 1,891 |
| 28 | Upper Burtuk | 81.42% | Prem Singh Tamang | SKM | 5,272 | 50.73% | D. R. Thapa | SDF | 4,699 | 45.21% | 573 |
| 29 | Kabi–Lungchok | 84.83% | Ugen Nedup Bhutia | SKM | 4,615 | 49.18% | Thenlay Tshering Bhutia | SDF | 4,489 | 47.84% | 126 |
| 30 | Djongu | 88.81% | Sonam Gyatso Lepcha | SDF | 4,618 | 63.67% | Dawa Tshering Lepcha | SKM | 2,443 | 33.68% | 2,175 |
| 31 | Lachen–Mangan | 85.13% | Tshering Wangdi Lepcha | SDF | 3,127 | 53.43% | Samdup Lepcha | SKM | 2,570 | 43.92% | 557 |
| 32 | Sangha | 75.69% | Sonam Lama | SKM | 1,096 | 49.86% | Palden Lachungpa | SDF | 971 | 44.18% | 125 |

== Government formation ==
SDF led by Chamling secured majority by winning 22 out of 32 seats. SKM won the rest ten seats.

Pawan Kumar Chamling was sworn in as the Chief Minister of Sikkim for the fifth time on 21 May 2014 by Shriniwas Dadasaheb Patil, the Governor of Sikkim. He became the chief minister fifth time, a record previously held by Jyoti Basu who ruled West Bengal from 1977 to 2000.

== See also ==
- Sikkim Legislative Assembly
