= List of constituencies of the Sikkim Legislative Assembly =

Sikkim Legislative Assembly
- 11th Sikkim Assembly

Type
- Type: Unicameral
- Term limits: 5 years
- Established: 1974
- Seats: 32

Elections
- Voting system: First past the post
- Last election: April 2024
- Next election: April 2029

Meeting place
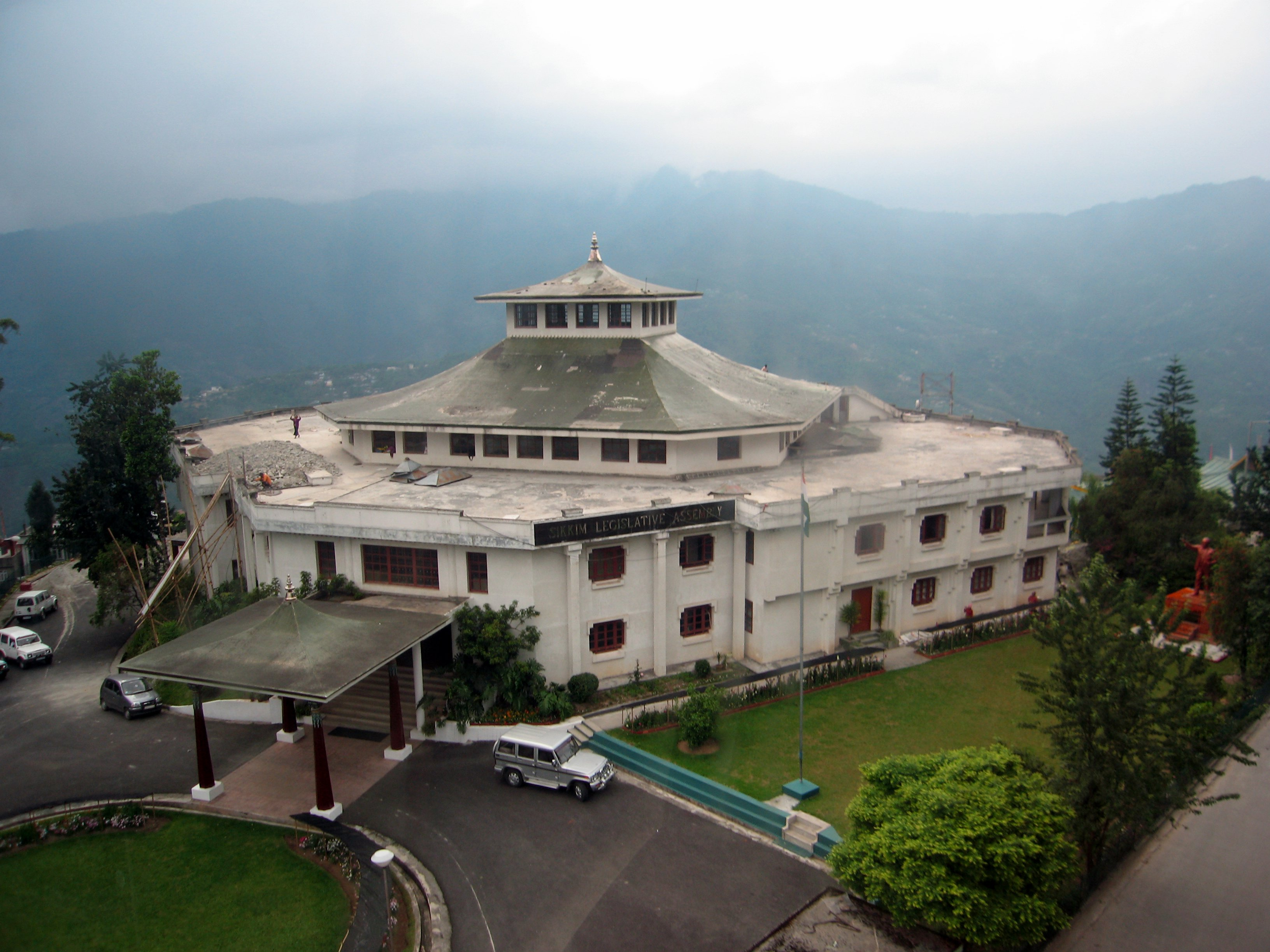
- Sikkim Legislative Assembly, Gangtok, Sikkim, India

Website
- Homepage

Location of Sikkim (highlighted in red) within India

The Sikkim Legislative Assembly is the unicameral legislature of the state of Sikkim, in Northeast India. The seat of the Legislative Assembly is at Gangtok, the capital of the state. The assembly sits for a term of five years, unless it is dissolved earlier. Sikkim is the second-smallest state in India, covering 7,096 km^{2} (2,740 sq mi); which accounts for 0.2 per cent of the total area of India. The current population of Sikkim is 6.32 lakhs (630,000), making it the least populous state in India. Established in 1975, the Sikkim Legislative Assembly consists of 32 members elected directly from single-seat constituencies using the first-past-the-post system.

Since the independence of India, the Scheduled Tribes (ST) and the Scheduled Castes (SC) and have been given reservation status, guaranteeing political representation, and the Constitution lays down the general principles of positive discrimination for SCs and STs. In Sikkim, the Scheduled Tribes primarily include the Bhutia, Lepcha, Limboo and Tamang communities. Twelve constituencies are reserved for the Scheduled Tribes. Among these, reservations are granted only to members of the Bhutia-Lepcha (BL) community. Despite being recognized as Scheduled Tribes in 2002, no seats have been reserved for the Limboo and Tamang communities in the Sikkim Legislative Assembly. Two constituencies (West Pendam and Salghari–Zoom) are reserved for people of the Scheduled Castes (Note: In Sikkim, the Scheduled Castes primarily include Damai, Kami, Lohar, Majhi, and Sarki communities) (SC). One constituency (Sangha) is reserved for registered Buddhist monks and nuns from the state's monasteries.

== History ==
The State Council was the legislature of the Kingdom of Sikkim until its merger with India in 1975. The members of the Council were deemed to be the new Legislative Assembly of the newly formed state.

Changes in the constituencies of the Sikkim Legislative Assembly over time
Year	Event	Explanation	Total seats	Reserved seats			Elections
Year	Event	Explanation	Total seats	BL	SC	Sangha	Elections
1979	Annexation of Sikkim	The Kingdom of Sikkim was merged with India, becoming its 22nd state.	32	12	2	1	1979, 1985, 1989, 1994, 1999, 2004
2008	Delimitation Commission Order, 2008	There was a redrawing of the constituency map without a change in the number of constituencies	32	12	2	1	2009, 2014, 2019, 2024

== Constituencies ==
Constituencies of the Sikkim Legislative Assembly

Since its integration with India in 1979, the total number of seats in the assembly has been 32, including 1 seat reserved for the Sangha.

Reservation
Bhutia-Lepcha (BL)
Scheduled Castes (SC)
Buddhist monks and nuns

Constituencies of the Sikkim Legislative Assembly
#	Constituency name	Reserved for (SC/BL/None)	District	Lok Sabha constituency	Electors (2024)
1	Yoksam–Tashiding	BL	Gyalshing	Sikkim	15,524
2	Yangthang	None	Gyalshing	Sikkim	14,121
3	Maneybong–Dentam	None	Gyalshing	Sikkim	16,403
4	Gyalshing–Barnyak	None	Gyalshing	Sikkim	13,683
5	Rinchenpong	BL	Soreng	Sikkim	16,024
6	Daramdin	BL	Soreng	Sikkim	16,404
7	Soreng–Chakung	None	Soreng	Sikkim	16,740
8	Salghari–Zoom	SC	Soreng	Sikkim	11,694
9	Barfung	BL	Namchi	Sikkim	15,980
10	Poklok–Kamrang	None	Namchi	Sikkim	16,870
11	Namchi–Singhithang	None	Namchi	Sikkim	13,251
12	Melli	None	Namchi	Sikkim	16,029
13	Namthang–Rateypani	None	Namchi	Sikkim	16,455
14	Temi–Namphing	None	Namchi	Sikkim	15,465
15	Rangang–Yangang	None	Namchi	Sikkim	15,261
16	Tumin–Lingee	BL	Namchi	Sikkim	16,767
17	Khamdong–Singtam	None	Gangtok	Sikkim	14,428
18	West Pendam	SC	Pakyong	Sikkim	15,880
19	Rhenock	None	Pakyong	Sikkim	18,356
20	Chujachen	None	Pakyong	Sikkim	18,749
21	Gnathang–Machong	BL	Pakyong	Sikkim	12,965
22	Namchaybong	None	Pakyong	Sikkim	16,397
23	Shyari	BL	Gangtok	Sikkim	16,196
24	Martam–Rumtek	BL	Gangtok	Sikkim	17,844
25	Upper Tadong	None	Gangtok	Sikkim	12,228
26	Arithang	None	Gangtok	Sikkim	12,602
27	Gangtok	BL	Gangtok	Sikkim	11,881
28	Upper Burtuk	None	Gangtok	Sikkim	16,236
29	Kabi–Lungchok	BL	Mangan	Sikkim	13,209
30	Djongu	BL	Mangan	Sikkim	10,523
31	Lachen–Mangan	BL	Mangan	Sikkim	8,404
32	Sangha	Sangha	Buddhist Monasteries	Sikkim	4,074

== See also ==
- Sikkim Legislative Assembly
- List of chief ministers of Sikkim
- State legislative assemblies of India
