= Sikkim Congress =

Sikkim Congress may refer to these political parties in the state of Sikkim, India:

- Sikkim State Congress (estb. 1947), in the kingdom of Sikkim, disestablished after Sikkim's merger with India in 1975
- Sikkim National Congress (estb. 1962), in the kingdom of Sikkim, disestablished after Sikkim's merger with India in 1975
- Sikkim Congress (Revolutionary) (1979–1981), in the Indian state of Sikkim
- Sikkim Prajatantra Congress, in the Indian state of Sikkim
- Sikkim Pradesh Congress Committee, branch of the Indian National Congress in the state
