= Chandra Das Rai =

Indian pro-democracy leader

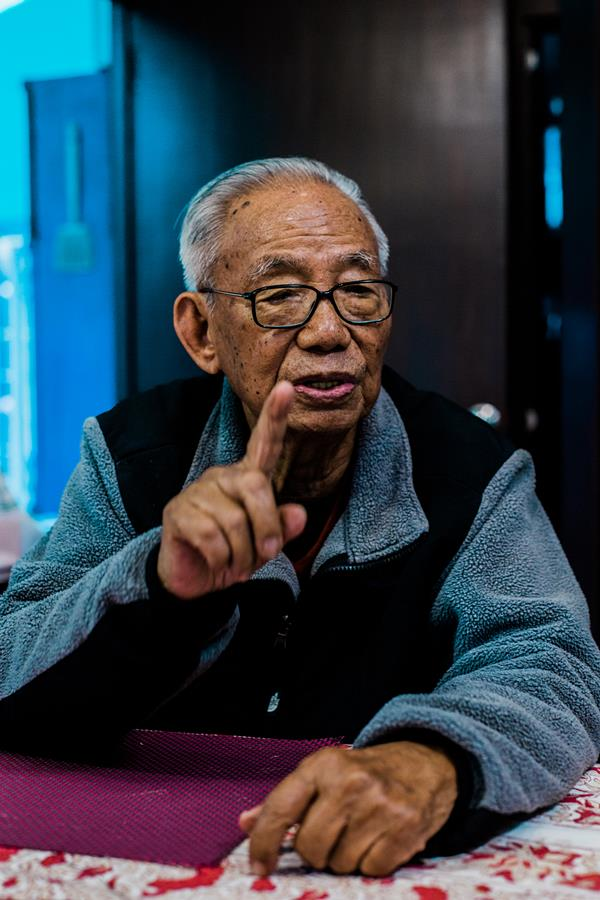

Minister for Education and Transport
- In office 8 May 1949 – 6 June 1949
- Monarch: Tashi Namgyal

Personal details
- Born: 13 April 1924 Mikhola, South Sikkim, Kingdom of Sikkim
- Died: 8 August 2020 (aged 96)
- Party: Sikkim State Congress
- Children: Prem Das Rai
- Education: Banaras Hindu University
- Occupation: Bureaucrat, Journalist, Leader

Chandra Das Rai (13 April 1924 – 8 August 2020) popularly known as C.D Rai was a politician of pre merger Sikkim, bureaucrat and former journalist. He was a senior leader in Sikkim State Congress.

== Personal life ==
Chandra Das Rai was born on 13 April 1924, at Mikhola, South Sikkim. He completed his primary education at the local village school and then went to Darjeeling where he completed his secondary education from St. Robert's School in 1945. Former Member of Parliament Prem Das Rai is his son.

== Career ==
Rai along with Tashi Tshering, Gobardhan Pradhan, DB Tiwari, DS Lepcha, Sonam Tshering, LD Kazi, Roy Choudhary and Helen Lepcha are among the founder members of the Sikkim State Congress. The Congress started agitation in February 1949 demanding the formation of an interim government and democratic reforms following which Rai and five others were arrested. This was followed by Congress supporters encircling the Palace on 1 May 1949. On 8 May 1949, he was made Minister for Education and Transport in the short lived ministry of the first CM of erstwhile Kingdom, Tashi Tshering. However the government was dismissed within 29 days by the Indian Political Officer Harishwar Dayal.

== Other works ==
In 1960, he became the Sikkim correspondent for Ananda Bazar Patrika. He also served as the first editor of Sikkim Herald. He was the editor of Himali Bela and Gangtok Times.

== Awards ==
- 2010- Kanchenjunga Kalam BBC Purashkar- Awarded by Press Club of Sikkim
- 2014- Bhanu Purashkar- Awarded by Nepali Sahitya Parishad, Sikkim
- 2018- Kashiraj Pradhan Lifetime Journalism Award- Presented by Government of Sikkim
