= Kazi Lhendup Dorjee =

First Chief Minister of Sikkim

Lhendup Dorjee Khangsarpa
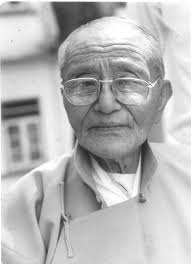
- Official Portrait, 1974

1st Chief Minister of Sikkim
- In office 16 May 1975 – 18 August 1979
- Governor: B. B. Lal
- Preceded by: Office established
- Succeeded by: President's rule

Prime Minister of Sikkim
- In office 23 July 1974 – 16 May 1975
- Monarch: Palden Thondup Namgyal
- Preceded by: Post established; Brajbir Saran Das as Chief Administration Officer
- Succeeded by: Office abolished

Executive Council of Sikkim
- In office 1967–1970
- Monarch: Palden Thondup Namgyal
- Constituency: West

Personal details
- Born: 11 October 1904 Pakyong, East Sikkim, Kingdom of Sikkim (now Sikkim, India)
- Died: 28 July 2007 (aged 102) Kalimpong, West Bengal
- Party: Indian National Congress (1975–2007)
- Other political affiliations: Sikkim National Congress (before 1975)
- Spouse: Elisa Maria

Kazi Lhendup Dorjee (11 October 1904 – 28 July 2007), also spelled Lhendup Dorji or Lhendup Dorji Khangsarpa was an Indian politician who was the first chief minister of Sikkim from 1975 to 1979 after its union with India. He was the last Prime Minister of Sikkim from 1974 to 1975. He also served as the Executive Council of Sikkim from 1967 to 1970. He was a member of INC after 1975 and Sikkim National Congress before 1975.

== Early life ==
Lhendup Dorjee was born in 1904 in Pakyong, East Sikkim, Sikkim. He was born into the Khangsarpa family, who were Sikkimese nobility and was of Bhutia origin. Dorji Khangsarpa entered the Rumtek monastery at the age of 6 years. His uncle, Tshurfuk Lama Rabden Dorji was the then Head Lama of the monastery and Dorjee became his disciple. Sidkeong Tulku Namgyal, then Maharaja of Sikkim, while visiting the monastery took a great liking to the hong monk and took him to Gangtok, where he placed him in a Tibetan School. At the age of 16, Dorjee returned to Rumtek monastery and under strict training for priesthood for two years. Thereafter on completion of his training he succeeded as the Head Lama of Rumtek monastery and its estates on the retirement of Lama Ugen Tenzing. Dorjee remained as the Head Lama in Rumtek monastery for eight years and then left the monastery to work with his brother the late Kazi Phag Tshering, who founded the Young Men Buddhist Association at Darjeeling. The two brothers founded a large number of schools in West Sikkim and were instrumental in bringing about a number of social and other reforms.

== Political career ==
Dorjee founded the Sikkim Praja Mandal in 1945 and served as its first president. Dorjee also became president of the Sikkim State Congress in 1953 and served as president until 1958.

In 1962, Dorjee helped to found the Sikkim National Congress political party. The Sikkim National Congress was founded by Dorjee as a non-communal political party. The unity themed political platform of the party helped the Sikkim National Congress to win eight of the eighteen seats up for grabs in Sikkim's third general election. He also served in the Executive Council of Sikkim after fourth Sikkimese general elections.

In 1973 Sikkimese general election amid allegations of vote rigging in South Sikkim in which Sikkim National Party emerged as the single largest party due to inequalities of the electoral system, the two main opposition Kazi led Sikkim National Congress and Sikkim Janata Congress boycotted the Executive Council and began fresh agitation for electoral reforms under “One Man One Vote” principle. Chogyal arrested Janata Congress President KC Pradhan on 27 March 1973. This led to mass protests against the Chogyal in Gangtok. A Joint Action Committee (JAC) was formed between Sikkim National Congress and Sikkim Janata Congress intensifying the agitation in Sikkim. The three senior most leaders of JAC, Kazi along with Nahakul Pradhan and B. B. Gurung were given shelter at the office of Indian Political Officer.

The Sikkim National Congress merged with India's Congress Party in the 1970s following Sikkim's annexation by India. Dorjee also formed the Sikkim Council to promote "communal harmony."

Dorjee was considered to be a key figure in the 1975 union of Sikkim with India. Dorjee served as the first Chief Minister of Sikkim from 1975, the year before the official merger, until 1979. Dorjee was honoured by the government of India with the Padma Vibhushan in 2002. He was also awarded the Sikkim Ratna by the state government of Sikkim in 2004.

== Kazini Elisa Maria ==
Dorjee's wife, Kazini Elisa Maria, formerly Elisa-Maria Langford-Rae, was a Belgian aristocrat and divorcee. She was of Scottish extraction and had studied law at Edinburgh University. She converted to Buddhism and took Sangharakshita as her teacher. In the 1920s she had been in Burma where for a while she was unsuccessfully pursued by the author George Orwell. Her birth name may have been Ethel Maud Shirran, according to her granddaughter.

== Death ==
Dorjee died of a heart attack on 28 July 2007 at his home in Kalimpong, in the Indian state of West Bengal. Kalimpong is located just across the state border from Sikkim. Dorjee was 102 years, 290 days at the time of his death. Though he died of a heart attack, Dorjee had been suffering from liver problems for several years.

Dorjee's funeral took place at the Rumtek Monastery in Sikkim on 3 August 2007.

The Chief Minister of Sikkim at the time, Pawan Kumar Chamling, called Dorjee a distinguished statesman who helped to motivate Chamling to join Sikkim's democracy movement in 1973.

Dr. Manmohan Singh, the then Prime Minister of India released a statement following Dorjee's death saying "He played a historic role as the architect of Sikkim's accession to the Indian Union and had the distinction of spearheading the State as its first Chief Minister from 1974 to 1979."

== Electoral record ==
Sikkim Legislative Assembly election

Year	Constituency	Political party	Result	Position	Votes	% Votes	% Margin	Deposit	Source
1979	Djongu	JNP	Lost	2nd/4	503	26.63	-19.16	refunded	
1985	Ralong	INC	Lost	2nd/7	576	22.88	-44.54	refunded	
