= Sikkim Swatantra Dal =

Former political party in Sikkim

Sikkim Swatantra Dal (translation: Sikkim Independence Party) was a political party in Sikkim. The party was founded and led by Namgay Tsering and Kazi Lhendup Dorji. The latter served as the president of the party. The party was launched ahead of the November 1958 election, formed after a split from the Sikkim State Congress. The party called for the abolition of the communal electoral system. Kazi Lhendup Dorji contested the November 1958 election, but lost his seat. Swantantra Dal won only a single seat in the election (a Bhutia-Lepcha seat).

Swatantra Dal took part in a conference, together with the Sikkim National Party, Sikkim State Congress and the Scheduled Castes League, held in Melli September 24-25, 1959. The conference demanded a full-fledged responsible government.

In May 1960 Kazi Lhendup Dorji founded a new party, the Sikkim National Congress.
