= Gnathang–Machong Assembly constituency =

Legislative Assembly constituency in Sikkim, India

Coordinates: 27.318°N 88.827°E

Gnathang-Machong
- Constituency No. 21 for the Sikkim Legislative Assembly

Constituency details
- Country: India
- Region: Northeast India
- State: Sikkim
- District: Pakyong
- Lok Sabha constituency: Sikkim
- Established: 2008
- Total electors: 12,048
- Reservation: BL

Member of Legislative Assembly
- 11th Sikkim Legislative Assembly
- Incumbent Pamin Lepcha
- Party: SKM
- Alliance: NDA
- Elected year: 2024

Gnathang–Machong is one of the 32 Legislative Assembly constituencies of Sikkim state in India.

This constituency is reserved for members of the Bhutia-Lepcha community and is part of Pakyong District. It is composed of the following Revenue Blocks of Pakyong Sub-Division: Pachey, Linkey, Parkha, Riwa, Machong, Chochenpheri, Latuk, Gnathang, Kartok, Rolep, Lamaten, Thekabung and Assam Lingjey, and Pakyong.

== Members of the Legislative Assembly ==
Election	Member	Party
2009	L.M. Lepcha	Sikkim Democratic Front
2014	Dorjee Tshering Lepcha	Sikkim Democratic Front
2019	Dorjee Tshering Lepcha	Sikkim Democratic Front
2024	Pamin Lepcha	Sikkim Krantikari Morcha

== Election results ==
=== Assembly Election 2024 ===
2024 Sikkim Legislative Assembly election: Gnathang–Machong
Party	Candidate	Votes	%	±%
SKM	Pamin Lepcha	6,676	61.58%	▲27.43
SDF	Tshering Wangdi Lepcha	2,869	26.46%	▼36.50
BJP	Sangay Gyatso Bhutia	602	5.55%	New
CAP–Sikkim	Phuri Sherpa	531	4.90%	New
NOTA	None of the Above	94	0.87%	▲0.02
INC	Tshering Pema Bhutia	69	0.64%	▼0.62
Margin of victory		3,807	35.12%	▲6.30
Turnout		10,841	83.62%	▼0.48
Registered electors		12,965		▲7.61
SKM gain from SDF		Swing	▼1.39	

=== Assembly election 2019 ===
2019 Sikkim Legislative Assembly election: Gnathang–Machong
Party	Candidate	Votes	%	±%
SDF	Dorjee Tshering Lepcha	6,380	62.97%	▲4.76
SKM	Tshering Bhutia	3,460	34.15%	▼1.83
INC	Dorjee Ongden Bhutia	127	1.25%	▲0.01
NOTA	None of the Above	86	0.85%	▲0.05
HSP	Sangay Chopel Bhutia	79	0.78%	New
Margin of victory		2,920	28.82%	▲6.59
Turnout		10,132	84.10%	▼1.41
Registered electors		12,048		▲19.52
SDF hold		Swing	▲4.76	

=== Assembly election 2014 ===
2014 Sikkim Legislative Assembly election: Gnathang–Machong
Party	Candidate	Votes	%	±%
SDF	Dorjee Tshering Lepcha	5,017	58.21%	▼0.38
SKM	Sonam Dorjee	3,101	35.98%	New
Independent	Pempa Tshering Bhutia	325	3.77%	New
INC	Dorjee Ongden Bhutia	107	1.24%	▼13.04
NOTA	None of the Above	69	0.80%	New
Margin of victory		1,916	22.23%	▼12.26
Turnout		8,619	85.51%	▼0.27
Registered electors		10,080		▲24.25
SDF hold		Swing	▼0.38	

=== Assembly election 2009 ===
2009 Sikkim Legislative Assembly election: Gnathang–Machong
Party	Candidate	Votes	%	±%
SDF	L.M. Lepcha	4,077	58.59%	New
SHRP	Chhopel Dzongpo Bhutia	1,677	24.10%	New
INC	Nima Wangchuk Bhutia	994	14.28%	New
Sikkim Gorkha Party	Phurba Tshering Sherpa	90	1.29%	New
Independent	Chewang Dorjee Bhutia	63	0.91%	New
NCP	Namgay Tshering Bhutia	58	0.83%	New
Margin of victory		2,400	34.49%	
Turnout		6,959	85.78%	
Registered electors		8,113		
SDF win (new seat)				

== See also ==
- List of constituencies of the Sikkim Legislative Assembly
- Pakyong district
