= Sikkim Scheduled Caste League =

Sikkim Scheduled Caste League (SSCL), a political party in Sikkim, was formed on the model of the Scheduled Caste League of Dr. B.R. Ambedkar. SSCL demanded a democratic government, as opposed to the then monarchic regime of Sikkim.

In the first State Council elections in 1953, SSCL had launched two candidates. None was elected.

The party also participated in the 1967 and 1979 elections. In the 1979 legislative assembly elections the party had two candidates, whom together got 85 votes. Purna Bahadur Khati stood in Ratneypani-West Pendam where he got 68 votes (2.74% of the votes in that constituency) and Sukman Dorjee stood in Khamdong where he got 17 votes (0.7%). Both constituencies were reserved for Scheduled Castes, the only two such constituencies in the state.
