= Sangha Assembly constituency =

Legislative Assembly constituency in Sikkim State, India

Coordinates: 27°33′N 88°30′E

Sangha
- Constituency No. 32 for the Sikkim Legislative Assembly

Constituency details
- Country: India
- Region: Northeast India
- State: Sikkim
- Lok Sabha constituency: Sikkim
- Established: 1958
- Total electors: 4,074
- Reservation: Sangha

Member of Legislative Assembly
- 11th Sikkim Legislative Assembly
- Incumbent Sonam Lama
- Party: SKM
- Alliance: NDA
- Elected year: 2024

Sikkim (highlighted in red), within India

Sangha Assembly constituency is one of the 32 assembly constituencies of Sikkim, a state in the Northeast region of India. It is a part of the Sikkim Lok Sabha constituency. Sonam Lama of the Sikkim Krantikari Morcha party is the representative of this constituency since 2014.

This seat is reserved for the Buddhist monastic community (Sangha) of Sikkim. Buddhist monks and nuns, registered with the 111 recognized monasteries in the state, are the only ones who can contest and cast their votes for this Assembly seat.

== Members of the Sikkim State Council ==
The Sangha constituency was created in 1958 for the Sikkim State Council, after requests from the monastery associations to the Chogyal.

Members of the Sikkim State Council
Election	Name	Party
1958	Lharipa Rinzing Lama	Sikkim National Party
1967	Pema Lama	Independent
1970	Rinzing Chewang Lama	Independent
1973	Peyching Lama	Sikkim National Party
1974	Karma Gompu Lama	Sikkim National Congress

== Members of the Legislative Assembly ==
After the 1975 Sikkimese monarchy referendum, Sikkim became a state of India and the members of the State Council at the time, were deemed to be the Legislative Assembly of the new state of Sikkim.

Members of the Sikkim Legislative Assembly
Election	Name	Party
1974	Karma Gompu Lama	Sikkim National Congress
1979	Lhachen Ganchen Rimpuchhi	Independent
1985	Namkha Gyaltsen	Sikkim Sangram Parishad
1989	Namkha Gyaltsen	Sikkim Sangram Parishad
1994	Namkha Gyaltsen	Indian National Congress
1999	Palden Lama	Independent
2004	Tshering Lama	Indian National Congress
2009	Phetook Tsh. Bhutia	Sikkim Democratic Front
2014	Sonam Lama	Sikkim Krantikari Morcha
2019	Sonam Lama	Sikkim Krantikari Morcha
2024	Sonam Lama	Sikkim Krantikari Morcha

== Supreme Court case ==
In 1993, a case was brought in the Supreme Court of India, challenging the reservation for the Sangha constituency and for the Bhutia-Lepcha constituencies in Sikkim, by Ram Chandra Poudyal of the Rising Sun Party. The Supreme Court dismissed the petition, judging that the Sangha had played a major part in previous Councils' decision-making and the reservation is not based purely on religious distinctions and is, therefore, not unconstitutional.

== Election results ==
=== Assembly Election 2024 ===
2024 Sikkim Legislative Assembly election: Sangha
Party	Candidate	Votes	%	±%
SKM	Sonam Lama	1,919	60.01	▼2.62
BJP	Tseten Tashi Bhutia	1,054	32.96	New
SDF	Tshering Lama	114	3.56	▼32.55
CAP–Sikkim	Norcho Lepcha	97	3.03	New
Margin of victory		865	27.05	▲0.53
Turnout		3,198	78.50	▲6.34
Registered electors		4,074		▲23.72
SKM hold		Swing	▼2.62	

=== Assembly election 2019 ===
2019 Sikkim Legislative Assembly election: Sangha
Party	Candidate	Votes	%	±%
SKM	Sonam Lama	1,488	62.63	▲12.76
SDF	Tshering Lama	858	36.11	▼8.07
INC	Karma Tashi Bhutia	17	0.72	▼4.20
NOTA	None of the Above	13	0.55	▼0.50
Margin of victory		630	26.52	▲20.83
Turnout		2,376	72.15	▼3.54
Registered electors		3,293		▲13.40
SKM hold		Swing	▲12.76	

=== Assembly election 2014 ===
2014 Sikkim Legislative Assembly election: Sangha
Party	Candidate	Votes	%	±%
SKM	Sonam Lama	1,096	49.86	New
SDF	Palden Lachungpa	971	44.18	▼5.32
INC	Tshering Lama	108	4.91	▼41.80
NOTA	None of the Above	23	1.05	New
Margin of victory		125	5.69	▲2.91
Turnout		2,198	75.69	▲10.94
Registered electors		2,904		▼5.04
SKM gain from SDF		Swing	▲0.37	

=== Assembly election 2009 ===
2009 Sikkim Legislative Assembly election: Sangha
Party	Candidate	Votes	%	±%
SDF	Phetook Tshering Bhutia	980	49.49	▲27.99
INC	Tshering Lama	925	46.72	▲14.39
BJP	Samdup Dorjee Lama	75	3.79	▲1.30
Margin of victory		55	2.78	▼1.44
Turnout		1,980	64.75	▼2.24
Registered electors		3,058		
SDF gain from INC		Swing		

=== Assembly election 2004 ===
2004 Sikkim Legislative Assembly election: Sangha
Party	Candidate	Votes	%	±%
INC	Tshering Lama	675	32.33	▲13.57
Independent	Palden Lama	587	28.11	New
SDF	Namkha Gyaltse Bhutia	449	21.50	New
Independent	Thinley Gyatso Lepcha	310	14.85	New
BJP	Samdup Dorjee Lama	52	2.49	New
Independent	Sonam Dorjee	15	0.72	New
Margin of victory		88	4.21	▼43.38
Turnout		2,088	66.99	▲7.02
Registered electors		3,117		
INC gain from Independent		Swing	▼34.02	

=== Assembly election 1999 ===
1999 Sikkim Legislative Assembly election: Sangha
Party	Candidate	Votes	%	±%
Independent	Palden Lama	1,309	66.35	New
INC	Namkha Gyaltsen Lama	370	18.75	▼28.33
SSP	Dorjee Dadul Lama	294	14.90	New
Margin of victory		939	47.59	▲39.98
Turnout		1,973	61.43	▲7.18
Registered electors		3,290		▲6.61
Independent gain from INC		Swing		

=== Assembly election 1994 ===
1994 Sikkim Legislative Assembly election: Sangha
Party	Candidate	Votes	%	±%
INC	Namkha Gyaltsen Lama	767	47.08	▲33.51
SDF	Palden Lama	643	39.47	New
Independent	Sherab Dorji	150	9.21	New
Independent	Karma Tenpa	40	2.46	New
Independent	Tshering Lama	16	0.98	New
Independent	Danen Lama	13	0.80	New
Margin of victory		124	7.61	▼18.46
Turnout		1,629	54.02	▲6.98
Registered electors		3,086		▼4.04
INC gain from SSP		Swing	▼7.63	

=== Assembly election 1989 ===
1989 Sikkim Legislative Assembly election: Sangha
Party	Candidate	Votes	%	±%
SSP	Nanjha Gyaltsen	806	54.72	▲2.40
Independent	Bazing	422	28.65	New
INC	Rikzing Lama	200	13.58	▼34.10
RIS	Pegyal	38	2.58	New
Margin of victory		384	26.07	▲21.42
Turnout		1,473	47.89	▲13.92
Registered electors		3,216		▲40.07
SSP hold		Swing	▲2.40	

=== Assembly election 1985 ===
1985 Sikkim Legislative Assembly election: Sangha
Party	Candidate	Votes	%	±%
SSP	Namkha Gyaltsen	383	52.32	New
INC	Lachen Gomchen Rinpochi	349	47.68	New
Margin of victory		34	4.64	▼83.79
Turnout		732	31.88	▼4.92
Registered electors		2,296		▲8.61
SSP gain from Independent		Swing		

=== Assembly election 1979 ===
1979 Sikkim Legislative Assembly election: Sangha
Party	Candidate	Votes	%	±%
Independent	Lhachen Ganchen Rimpuchhi	733	94.22	New
SPC	Pema Lama	45	5.78	New
Margin of victory		688	88.43	
Turnout		778	38.13	
Registered electors		2,114		
Independent win (new seat)				

=== Sikkim State Council ===
==== 1974 ====
1974 Sikkimese general election: Sangha
Party	Candidate	Votes	%	±%
SNC	Karma Gonpo Lama			NA
Independent	Pema Chophel Lama			NA
Majority				NA
Turnout				NA
SNC gain from SNP		Swing	NA	

==== 1973 ====
In the 1973 election, Peyching Lama was elected unopposed.

==== 1970 ====
1970 Sikkimese general election: Sangha
Party	Candidate	Votes	%	±%
Independent	Rinzing Chewang Lama	367	82.29	
SJP	Karma Lama	46	10.31	
SNC	Kincho Tempa Lama	33	7.40	
Majority		321	71.97	
Turnout		446		
Independent hold		Swing		

==== 1967 ====
1967 Sikkimese general election: Sangha
Party	Candidate	Votes	%	±%
Independent	Pema Lama			
	Rabzang Lama			
Majority				
Turnout				
Independent gain from SNP		Swing		

== See also ==
- List of constituencies of the Sikkim Legislative Assembly
- List of Buddhist monasteries in Sikkim
- Sikkim Lok Sabha constituency
- Reserved political positions in India
