= Lal Bahadur Basnet =

Indian politician (1926–1998)

Former Deputy Speaker of Sikkim Legislative Assembly,
- In office 1979–1989
- Preceded by: Dorjee Tshering Bhutia
- Succeeded by: Manita Pradhan
- Constituency: Gangtok

Personal details
- Born: 17 December 1926 Nazitam, Sang, Kingdom of Sikkim
- Died: 5 May 1998 (aged 71)
- Party: Sikkim National Congress, Sikkim Janata Party

Lal Bahadur Basnet (Sikkimese Nepali: लाल बहादुर बस्नेत) (17 December 1926 – 5 May 1998) was a politician and a leader of the Pro-Democracy Movement in the erstwhile Himalayan Kingdom of Sikkim.

== Personal life ==
Lal Bahadur Basnet was born to Lieutenant (honorary) Prem Bahadur Basnet and Narbada Devi at Nazitam, Sang in East Sikkim. At the age of four, he, along with his parents, left Sikkim for Dehradun to get basic education and later went to Ludhiana, Punjab University for his graduation. In 1945, he went to United Services Pre-Cadet College Belgaum to join the army. He was court-martialed due to his direct and open letter to a high-ranking army officer, on the corrupt practices of his superiors. In his letter he stated about "the dissatisfaction prevailing in 2/5 Gurkha Rifles", which was not supported by other high-ranking officers. He was sent for a rigorous three months imprisonment, but was released after spending one and a half months in the jail. After resigning from the Indian Army, he went to the Himalayas in search of spiritual satisfaction. After a brief sojourn in the Himalayan foothills he returned home to his wife (Sumitra) and his children: Bhawendra Basnet, Gopal Basnet, and Dipa Basnet. In 1961, he sat for the Sikkim's first Civil Service Examinations and was appointed a magistrate in Gangtok. The life of a public servant in a feudal monarchy was not his cup of tea. He resigned and left for Kathmandu where he worked as a journalist. His close relations with student leaders active in the pro democracy movement of Nepal led to his arrest and incarceration for nine months. This experience of jail in Nepal is documented in his book "His Majesty's Paying Guest".

== Politics ==
Basnet joined the Sikkim National Congress, a political party headed by L.D. Kazi appointed Joint Secretary of the Party. In the general election of 1967, the Sikkim National Congress won 10 out of 18 seats. Much credit for the victory goes to Basnet for his political stalwartness. Because of his divergent political views with L.D. Kazi he resigned from the Sikkim National Congress and founded the Sikkim Janata Party in 1969. His party was active in the pro-democracy movement in the kingdom of Sikkim. After victory in the election of 1979, he was elected as the deputy speaker of the Sikkim Legislative Assembly.

== Bibliography ==
- Sikkim: A Short Political History by Lal Bahadur Basnet. S. Chand Group New Delhi (India), 1974
- His Majesty's Paying Guest by Lal Bahadur Basnet. Original from the University of Virginia, 1980
