= 1953 Sikkimese general election =

| 23 May 1953 | 1958 → |

12 of the 18 seats in the State Council
| | Majority party | Minority party |
|---|---|---|
| Party | SNP | SSC |
| Seats won | 6 | 6 |

General elections were held in Sikkim in May 1953. The Sikkim National Party and the Sikkim State Congress both won six seats each in the State Council. Voter turnout was less than 30%.

== Electoral system ==
The State Council was established in 1953 by the Chogyal. It had 18 members, of which 12 were elected and six (including the President) appointed by the Chogyal. Of the 12 elected members, six were for the Nepali community and six for the Lepcha and the Bhutia communities.

Candidates for election to the Council had to be at least 30 years old, whilst the voting age was set at 21. Around 50,000 voters registered for the election.

== Results ==
| Party | Seats | | |
| Party | Bhutia-Lepcha | Nepali | Total |
|---|---|---|---|
| Sikkim National Party | 6 | 0 | 6 |
| Sikkim State Congress | 0 | 6 | 6 |
| Appointed members | – | – | 6 |
| Total | 6 | 6 | 18 |
Source: Hamlet Bareh

=== Constituency-wise ===
| # | Constituency | Reservation | Name | Party |
|---|---|---|---|---|
| 1 | North-Central | Bhutia-Lepcha | Sonam Tshering Lepcha | Sikkim National Party |
| 2 | North-Central | Bhutia-Lepcha | Martam Topden | Sikkim National Party |
| 3 | North-Central | Sikkimese Nepali | Khus Narain Pradhan | Sikkim State Congress |
| 4 | Gangtok | Bhutia-Lepcha | Chodup Lepcha | Sikkim National Party |
| 5 | Gangtok | Bhutia-Lepcha | Netuk Bhutia | Sikkim National Party |
| 6 | Gangtok | Sikkimese Nepali | Adhiklal Pradhan | Sikkim State Congress |
| 7 | Namchi | Bhutia-Lepcha | Kunzang Rapgay | Sikkim National Party |
| 8 | Namchi | Sikkimese Nepali | Kashi Raj Pradhan | Sikkim State Congress |
| 9 | Namchi | Sikkimese Nepali | Jai Narayan Subba | Sikkim State Congress |
| 10 | Pemayangtse | Bhutia-Lepcha | Sonam Wangchuk | Sikkim National Party |
| 11 | Pemayangtse | Sikkimese Nepali | Dhan Bahadur Gurung | Sikkim State Congress |
| 12 | Pemayangtse | Sikkimese Nepali | Nahakul Pradhan | Sikkim State Congress |
Source: Sikkim Darbar Gazette

=== Appointed members ===
In addition to the elected members, five members were appointed to the Sikkim State Council by the Chogyal; John S. Lal (President of the Council and Dewan of Sikkim), Rai Bahadur Densapa, Tekbir Khati, Palda Lama and Hon Lt Prem Bahadur Basnet.

== Executive Council ==
Following the elections, an Executive Council was appointed, which consisted of the President of the Council, John S. Lal and two of the elected members, Sonam Tsering and Kashiraj Pradhan.

| Name | Responsibilities |
|---|---|
| John S. Lal | President of the Executive Council |
| Kashiraj Pradhan | Public Works, Excise, Education, and Transport |
| Sonam Tsering | Bazars, Forests, Health, and Press & publicity |
Source: Proclamations from the Chogyal and the Dewan
