= 1973 Sikkimese general election =

- 10 and 23 January 1973

18 of the 24 seats in the State Council
	Majority party	Minority party	Third party
Party	SNP	SNC	SJC
Last election	8	3	–
Seats won	9	5	2
Seat change	▲1	▲2	–

General elections were held in Sikkim in January 1973 to elect members of the State Council. The Sikkim National Party emerged as the largest party, winning nine of the 18 elected seats.

== Electoral system ==
The State Council was established in 1953 by the Chogyal. It originally had 18 members, of which 12 were elected and six (including the President) appointed by the Chogyal. Of the 12 elected members, six were for the Nepali community and six for the Lepcha and the Bhutia communities. For the 1958 elections the number of seats was increased to 20 by adding one seat for the Sangha and an additional appointed member. In 1966 a further four seats had been added; one each for the Nepali and Lepcha/Bhutia communities, together with one for the Tsong and a scheduled caste seat.

Candidates for election to the Council had to be at least 30 years old, whilst the voting age was set at 21.

== Election schedule ==
The election schedule was announced by the Election Commission on 23 September 1972.

#	Poll Event	Date
1	Publication of final electoral rolls	24 October 1972
2	Last Date for filing nomination	31 October 1972
3	Last date for withdrawal of nominations	25 November 1972
4	Polling - Phase 1 (West, South districts)	10 January 1973
4	Polling - Phase 2 (Gangtok, East, North districts)	23 January 1973
5	Date of Counting	29 January 1973
6	Announcement of Results	15 February 1973

== Campaign ==
Prior to the elections the Sikkim State Congress and the Sikkim Janata Party merged to form the Sikkim Janata Congress.

== Results ==
Party	Seats	+/–
Sikkim National Party	9	+1
Sikkim National Congress	5	+2
Sikkim Janata Congress	2	–
Independents	2	–
Appointed members	6	0
Total	24	0
Source: AC Sinha

=== Constituency-wise ===
#	Constituency	Reservation	Name	Party
1	West	Sikkimese Nepali	Chattra Bahadur Chettri	Sikkim National Congress
2	West	Sikkimese Nepali	Chandra Bahadur Rai	Sikkim National Congress
3	West	Bhutia-Lepcha	Thendup Tsering Bhutia	Sikkim National Party
4	South	Sikkimese Nepali	Durga Prasad Rai	Sikkim National Congress
5	South	Sikkimese Nepali	Bhuwani Prasad Kharel	Sikkim Janata Congress
6	South	Bhutia-Lepcha	Khunzang Dorji	Sikkim National Party
7	Gangtok	Sikkimese Nepali	Ashok Tsering Bhutia	Sikkim National Party
8	Gangtok	Bhutia-Lepcha	Harka Bahadur Basnett	Sikkim National Party
9	East	Sikkimese Nepali	Nima Tenzing	Sikkim National Party
10	East	Sikkimese Nepali	Kalzing Gyatso	Sikkim National Party
11	East	Bhutia-Lepcha	Bhuwani Prasad Dahal	Sikkim Janata Congress
12	North	Sikkimese Nepali	Netuk Lama	Sikkim National Party
13	North	Sikkimese Nepali	Ugyen Palzor Kazi	Sikkim National Party
14	North	Bhutia-Lepcha	Kul Bahadur Chettri	Sikkim National Party
15	General	None	Kazi Lhendup Dorjee	Sikkim National Congress
16	General	SC	Purna Bahadur Khati	Independent
17	General	Tsong	Krishna Bahadur Limbu	Sikkim National Congress
18	General	Sangha	Peyching Lama	Independent
Source: Election Committee

=== Appointed members ===
In addition to the elected members, six members were appointed to the Sikkim State Council by the Chogyal on 5 March; Traten Sherba Gyaltsen, Madan Mohan Rasaily, Chhoutuk Tsering Pazo, Dhan Bahadur Chettri, Kali Prasad Rai and Atang Lepcha.

== Aftermath ==
Following the election, the Sikkim National Congress and Sikkim Janata Congress claimed that vote rigging took place in the South Sikkim constituency. They demanded that officials involved were arrested, but these demands were not met, leading to protests. The unrest led to the signing of a tripartite agreement on 8 May between the Choygal, Sikkimese political parties and the government of India. The agreement provided for the establishment of a responsible government under the supervision of a Chief Executive nominated by the Indian government.
