= 1958 Sikkimese general election =

- 1958

14 of the 20 seats in the State Council
	Majority party	Minority party	Third party
Party	SSC	SNP	IND
Last election	6	6	0
Seats won	7	6	1
Seat change	▲1	Steady	▲1

General elections were held in Sikkim in 1958 to elect members of the State Council. The Sikkim State Congress emerged as the largest party, winning seven of the 14 elected seats. Voter turnout was around 35%.

== Electoral system ==
The State Council was established in 1953 by the Chogyal. It originally had 18 members, of which 12 were elected and six (including the President) appointed by the Chogyal. Of the 12 elected members, six were for the Nepali community and six for the Lepcha and the Bhutia communities. For the 1958 elections the number of seats was increased to 20. One seat for the Sangha was added, together with an unreserved seat.

Candidates for election to the Council had to be at least 30 years old, whilst the voting age was set at 21. Around 55,000 voters registered for the election.

== Results ==
Party	Seats				
Party	Bhutia-Lepcha	Nepali	Others	Total	+/–
Sikkim State Congress	1	6	0	7	+1
Sikkim National Party	5	0	1	6	0
Independent	0	0	1	1	+1
Appointed members	–	–	–	6	0
Total	6	6	2	20	+2
Source: Hamlet Bareh

=== Constituency-wise ===
#	Constituency	Reservation	Name	Party
1	Gangtok	Bhutia-Lepcha	Sonam Tshering Lepcha	
2	Gangtok	Bhutia-Lepcha	Kesang Wangdi	
3	Gangtok	Sikkimese Nepali	Narendra Nar Singh	Sikkim State Congress
4	North-Central	Bhutia-Lepcha	Martam Topden	
5	North-Central	Bhutia-Lepcha	Thendup Bhutia	
6	North-Central	Sikkimese Nepali	Nahakul Pradhan	Sikkim State Congress
7	Namchi	Bhutia-Lepcha	Kazi Norbu Wangdi	
8	Namchi	Sikkimese Nepali	Sangkhaman Rai	Sikkim State Congress
9	Namchi	Sikkimese Nepali	Kashi Raj Pradhan	Sikkim State Congress
10	Pemayangtse	Bhutia-Lepcha	Gaden Tashi	
11	Pemayangtse	Sikkimese Nepali	Sher Bahadur Gurung	Sikkim State Congress
12	Pemayangtse	Sikkimese Nepali	Bhujit Mukhia	Sikkim State Congress
13	General	General	Chaksung Bhutia	
14	General	Sangha	Lharipa Rinzing Lama	Sikkim National Party
Source: Sikkim Darbar Gazette

=== Appointed members ===
In addition to the elected members, six others were appointed to the Sikkim State Council by the Chogyal, on 15 March; Rai Bahadur Densapa, Rev. Chotuk Tsering Pazo, Indra Prasad Subba, Bhairap Bahadur Lamchaney, Atal Singh Dewan and Hon Lt Prem Bahadur Basnet.

== Executive Council ==
The Executive Council was chosen from among the elected members, in addition to the Dewan of Sikkim, who was its President:

Name	Responsibility
N. K. Rustomji	President
K. R. Pradhan	Senior Executive Councillor
Martam Topden	Executive Councillor
Nahakul Pradhan	Deputy Executive Councillor
Norbu Wangdi	Deputy Executive Councillor
Chuksung Bhutia	Deputy Executive Councillor
Source: Proceedings of the Executive Council
