= Lachen–Mangan Assembly constituency =

Constituency of the Sikkim legislative assembly in India

Coordinates: 27.60°N 88.55°E

Lachen-Mangan
- Constituency No. 31 for the Sikkim Legislative Assembly

Constituency details
- Country: India
- Region: Northeast India
- State: Sikkim
- District: Mangan
- Lok Sabha constituency: Sikkim
- Established: 2008
- Total electors: 7,867
- Reservation: BL

Member of Legislative Assembly
- 11th Sikkim Legislative Assembly
- Incumbent Samdup Lepcha
- Party: SKM
- Alliance: NDA
- Elected year: 2024

Lachen-Mangan Assembly constituency is one of the 32 assembly constituencies of Sikkim, a north east state of India. This constituency falls under Sikkim Lok Sabha constituency.

This constituency is reserved for members of the Bhutia-Lepcha community.

== Members of the Legislative Assembly ==
Election	Member	Party
2009	Tshering Wangdi Lepcha	Sikkim Democratic Front
2014	Tshering Wangdi Lepcha	Sikkim Democratic Front
2019	Samdup Lepcha	Sikkim Krantikari Morcha
2024	Samdup Lepcha	Sikkim Krantikari Morcha

== Election results ==
=== Assembly Election 2024 ===
2024 Sikkim Legislative Assembly election: Lachen–Mangan
Party	Candidate	Votes	%	±%
SKM	Samdup Lepcha	3,929	55.37%	▲1.57
SDF	Hishey Lachungpa	3,078	43.38%	▼1.73
NOTA	None of the Above	89	1.25%	▲0.17
Margin of victory		851	11.99%	▲3.30
Turnout		7,096	84.44%	▼0.97
Registered electors		8,404		▲6.83
SKM hold		Swing	▲1.57	

=== Assembly election 2019 ===
2019 Sikkim Legislative Assembly election: Lachen–Mangan
Party	Candidate	Votes	%	±%
SKM	Samdup Lepcha	3,615	53.80%	▲9.89
SDF	Tshering Wangdi Lepcha	3,031	45.11%	▼8.32
NOTA	None of the Above	73	1.09%	▼0.26
Margin of victory		584	8.69%	▼0.83
Turnout		6,719	85.41%	▲0.28
Registered electors		7,867		▲14.45
SKM gain from SDF		Swing	▲0.37	

=== Assembly election 2014 ===
2014 Sikkim Legislative Assembly election: Lachen–Mangan
Party	Candidate	Votes	%	±%
SDF	Tshering Wangdi Lepcha	3,127	53.43%	▲0.13
SKM	Samdup Lepcha	2,570	43.92%	New
NOTA	None of the Above	79	1.35%	New
INC	Topden Lepcha	76	1.30%	▼36.73
Margin of victory		557	9.52%	▼5.75
Turnout		5,852	85.13%	▼4.34
Registered electors		6,874		▲20.58
SDF hold		Swing	▲0.13	

=== Assembly election 2009 ===
2009 Sikkim Legislative Assembly election: Lachen–Mangan
Party	Candidate	Votes	%	±%
SDF	Tshering Wangdi Lepcha	2,719	53.30%	New
INC	Anil Lachenpa	1,940	38.03%	New
SHRP	Chewang Jigme Lepcha	442	8.66%	New
Margin of victory		779	15.27%	
Turnout		5,101	89.48%	
Registered electors		5,701		
SDF win (new seat)				

== See also ==
- Sikkim Lok Sabha constituency
- Mangan district
