= 1967 Sikkimese general election =

- 16 March 1967

18 of the 24 seats in the State Council
	Majority party	Minority party	Third party
Party	SNC	SNP	SSC
Last election	–	6	7
Seats won	8	5	2
Seat change	New	▼1	▼5

General elections were held in Sikkim in March 1967, having been due earlier but postponed after a state of emergency was declared following the Sino-Indian War. The Sikkim National Congress emerged as the largest single party, winning eight of the 24 seats. Although the Sikkim National Party won only five seats, its parliamentary faction was joined by three others (one each from the Tsong (Limbu), Sangha and scheduled caste reserved seats).

== Electoral system ==
The State Council was established in 1953 by the Chogyal. It originally had 18 members, of which 12 were elected and six (including the President) appointed by the Chogyal. Of the 12 elected members, six were from the Nepali community and six from the Bhutia-Lepcha community. For the 1958 elections the number of seats was increased to 20 by adding one seat for the Sangha and an additional appointed member. In 1966, a further four seats had been added; one each for the Nepali and Lepcha/Bhutia communities, together with one for the Tsong (Limbu) and a scheduled caste seat.

Candidates for election to the Council had to be at least 30 years old, whilst the voting age was set at 21.

== Results ==
Party	Seats	+/–
Sikkim National Congress	8	New
Sikkim National Party	5	–1
Sikkim State Congress	2	–5
Others	3	+3
Appointed members	6	–1
Total	24	+4
Source: Hamlet Bareh

=== Constituency-wise ===
#	Constituency	Reservation	Name	Party
1	Gangtok	Bhutia-Lepcha	R. Namgyal	Sikkim National Congress
2	Gangtok	Sikkimese Nepali	Chatur Singh Rai	Sikkim National Congress
3	East	Bhutia-Lepcha	Netuk Bhutia	Sikkim National Party
4	East	Bhutia-Lepcha	Nima Tenzing	Sikkim National Party
5	East	Sikkimese Nepali	Nahakul Pradhan	Sikkim State Congress
6	South	Bhutia-Lepcha	Nayan Tsering Lepcha	Sikkim National Party
7	South	Sikkimese Nepali	Garjaman Gurung	Sikkim National Congress
8	South	Sikkimese Nepali	Thakur Singh Rai	Sikkim National Congress
9	West	Bhutia-Lepcha	Ongden Lepcha	Sikkim National Congress
10	West	Sikkimese Nepali	Bhim Bahadur Gurung	Sikkim National Congress
11	West	Sikkimese Nepali	Premlall Tiwari	Sikkim National Congress
12	North	Bhutia-Lepcha	Martam Topden	Sikkim National Party
13	North	Bhutia-Lepcha	Pawo Tensung Bhutia	Sikkim National Party
14	North	Sikkimese Nepali	Jitbahadur Lama	Sikkim State Congress
15	General	None	Lendhup Dorji Khangsarpa	Sikkim National Congress
16	General	Sangha	Pema Lama	Independent
17	General	Tsong	Harka Dhoj Tsong	Independent
18	General	SC	Purna Bahadur Khati	Independent
Source: Sikkim Darbar Gazette

=== Appointed members ===
In addition to the elected members, six members were appointed to the Sikkim State Council by the Chogyal, which included R. N. Haldipur (Dewan of Sikkim and President of the Council), M. M. Rasailly, Hon. Lt. P. B. Basnet, Sonam Wangyal, I. B. Gurung, and Sangey Tempo.

== Executive Council ==
From the elected members, the following were appointed as members of the Executive Council, by the Chogyal:

#	Name	Role
1	Netuk Tsering	Executive Councillor
2	Bhim Bahadur Gurung	Executive Councillor
3	Nahakul Pradhan	Executive Councillor
4	Nayan Tsering	Deputy Executive Councillor
5	Nima Tsering	Deputy Executive Councillor
6	Thakur Singh Rai	Deputy Executive Councillor
