= List of heads of government of the Kingdom of Sikkim =

Flag of the Kingdom of Sikkim from 1967 until 1975.

Map of Sikkim.

This article lists the heads of government of the Kingdom of Sikkim from 1944 to 1975, when Sikkim became the 22nd state of India following a referendum.

== List ==
(Dates in italics indicate de facto continuation of office)

No.	Portrait	Name	Term	Notes
President of the State Council
1		Palden Thondup Namgyal	1944–1949	Later reigned as the twelfth and last Chogyal, in 1963–1975.
Chief Minister
2		Tashi Tshering	9 May 1949 – 6 June 1949	
3		Harishwar Dayal	6 June 1949 – 11 August 1949	Interim
Dewan
4		John S. Lall	11 August 1949 – 1954	
5		Nari Kaikhosru Rustomji	1954–1959	
6		Baleshwar Prasad	22 August 1959 – 1963	
Principal Administrative Officer
7		Ramdas Narayan Haldipur	1963–1969	
Sidlon
8		Inder Sen Chopra	1969 – July 1972	
Chief Administrative Officer
9		Brajbir Saran Das	9 April 1973 – 23 July 1974	
Prime Minister
10		Kazi Lhendup Dorjee	23 July 1974 – 16 May 1975	Afterwards served as the first Chief Minister of Sikkim, in 1975–1979.

== See also ==
- Chogyal
- List of political officers in the Kingdom of Sikkim
- History of Sikkim
