= Dorjee Tshering Lepcha =

Indian politician

Member of Parliament, Rajya Sabha
- Incumbent
- Assumed office 24 February 2024
- Preceded by: Hishey Lachungpa
- Constituency: List of Rajya Sabha members from Sikkim

Member of Sikkim Legislative Assembly
- In office 16 May 2014 – 23 February 2024
- Preceded by: L. M. Lepcha
- Succeeded by: Pamin Lepcha
- Constituency: Gnathang Machong
- In office May 1994 – May 2009
- Preceded by: Chamla Tshering Bhutia
- Succeeded by: Constituency abolished
- Constituency: Martam

Personal details
- Born: 15 April 1957 (age 69) Turung Village,South Sikkim
- Party: Bharatiya Janata Party
- Other political affiliations: Sikkim Sangram Parishad (1994–1999); Sikkim Democratic Front (1999–2019)
- Spouse: Devika Lepcha
- Children: 2, including Pamin Lepcha
- Profession: Political and Social Worker

Dorjee Tshering Lepcha better known as D. T. Lepcha is an Indian politician currently serving as a Member of Parliament at the Rajya Sabha from Sikkim as a member of the Bharatiya Janata Party.He has been elected in Sikkim Legislative Assembly election in 2014 and 2019 from Gnathang Machong constituency as candidate of Sikkim Democratic Front but later he joined Bharatiya Janata Party. He was minister of Sikkim Public Works (Buildings & Housing) and Transport in Pawan Chamling fifth ministry from 2014 to 2019.

Dorjee Tshering Lepcha was declared as Bharatiya Janata Party's (BJP) Rajya Sabha candidate from Sikkim for upcoming elections held on 19 January 2024. He was elected unopposed.
