= Tashi Tshering (Sikkimese politician) =

Indian politician

Chief Minister of Kingdom of Sikkim
- In office 8 May 1949 – 6 June 1949
- Monarch: Tashi Namgyal
- Preceded by: New office
- Succeeded by: Harishwar Dayal

Personal details
- Party: Sikkim State Congress

Tashi Tshering (Sikkimese: བཀྲ་ཤིས་ཚེ་རིང་; Wylie: bkra-shis tshe-ring) was the first Chief Minister in erstwhile Kingdom of Sikkim from 8 May 1949 to 6 June 1949. He was the President of Sikkim State Congress.

== Career ==
Tashi Tshering founded the Praja Sudharak Samaj in 1940s. Sikkim State Congress was formed on 7 December 1947 after localised organisations Praja Sudharak Samaj, Praja Sammelan and Praja Mandal jointly decided to form a unified party. He along with Gobardhan Pradhan, DB Tiwari, CD Rai, DS Lepcha, Sonam Tshering, LD Kazi, Roy Choudhary and Helen Lepcha are the founder members of the Sikkim State Congress. Tshering was also the President of the newly formed party. After the formation of the Congress, Tshering organised its first public meeting on 7 December 1947 at Gangtok demanding abolishing landlordism, forming an interim government and accession to India. In 1949, Sikkim State Congress led a statewide agitation for democracy leading to formation of Sikkim's first interim government led by Chief Minister Tashi Tshering and his popular ministry. However the government was dismissed within 29 days by the Indian Political Officer Harishwar Dayal.
