= Sikkim Ratna =

Sikkim government award

Sikkim Ratna Award
- Type: State Civilian honour of Sikkim
- Awarded for: Services of personalities in various fields
- Sponsored by: Government of Sikkim
- Location: Sikkim
- Reward: ₹500,000

Sikkim Ratna (Nepali: सिक्किम रत्न, "translates to Jewel of Sikkim" or "Gem of Sikkim") is the highest civilian award of the Sikkim government. The award was announced by the state government in 2004 at the 57th Independence Day celebrations. It is the highest civilian award of the state for outstanding service to the people of Sikkim. Sikkim Ratna is given in all disciplines of activities, namely social services (Sewa), sports (Khel), music & arts (Kala), literature (Sahitya), and trade & industry (Udyog).

Sikkim's first chief minister Lhendup Dorjee Khangsharpa, popularly known as L.D. Kazi, was conferred the state's first Sikkim Ratna award.
