= Sonam Lama (Sikkim politician) =

Indian politician and monk

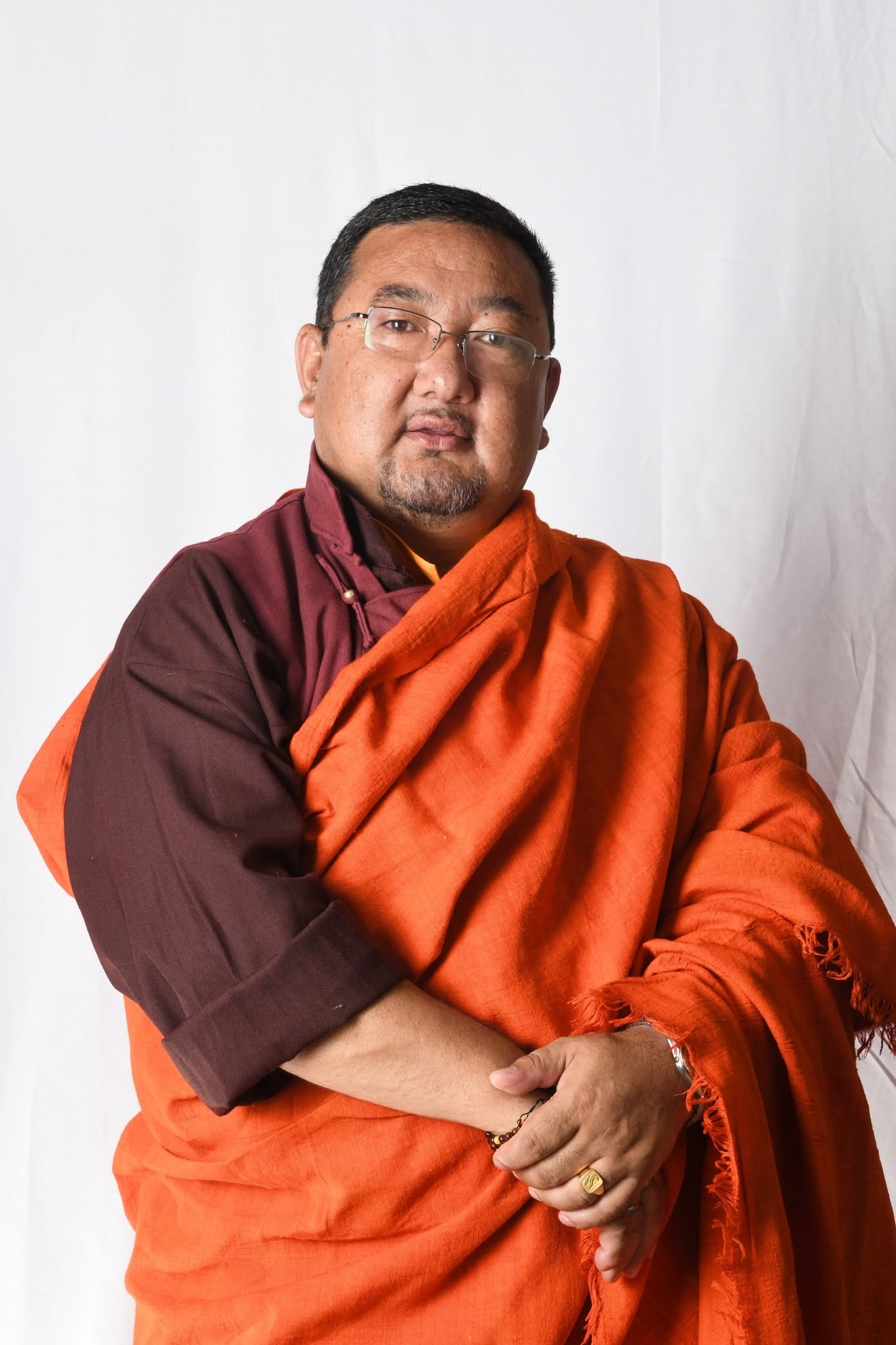
- Sonam Lama in 2022

Minister of Ecclesiastical Affairs of Sikkim
- Incumbent
- Assumed office 27 May 2019
- Governor: Lakshman Acharya; Ganga Prasad; Om Prakash Mathur
- Chief Minister: Prem Singh Tamang
- Preceded by: Pawan Kumar Chamling

Minister of Public Health Engineering of Sikkim
- Incumbent
- Assumed office 10 June 2024
- Governor: Lakshman Acharya; Om Prakash Mathur
- Chief Minister: Prem Singh Tamang
- Preceded by: Bhim Hang Limboo

Minister of Water Resources of Sikkim
- Incumbent
- Assumed office 10 June 2024
- Governor: Lakshman Acharya; Om Prakash Mathur
- Chief Minister: Prem Singh Tamang
- Preceded by: Bhim Hang Limboo

Minister of Rural Development of Sikkim
- In office 27 May 2019 – 10 June 2024
- Governor: Lakshman Acharya; Ganga Prasad
- Chief Minister: Prem Singh Tamang
- Preceded by: Sher Bahadur Subedi
- Succeeded by: Arun Kumar Upreti

Minister of Cooperation of Sikkim
- In office 27 May 2019 – 10 June 2024
- Governor: Lakshman Acharya; Ganga Prasad
- Chief Minister: Prem Singh Tamang
- Preceded by: Sher Bahadur Subedi
- Succeeded by: Arun Kumar Upreti

Member of the Sikkim Legislative Assembly
- Incumbent
- Assumed office 14 April 2014
- Preceded by: Phetook Tshering Bhutia
- Constituency: Sangha

Personal details
- Born: Sonam Lama; 12 February 1976 (age 50) Radham, Khamdong
- Party: Sikkim Krantikari Morcha
- Other political affiliations: National Democratic Alliance

Sonam Lama is an Indian politician and monk in Sikkim. He is a minister in Second Tamang ministry. He was also a minister in First Tamang ministry.

== Political career ==
Sonam Lama stood as the candidate of Sikkim Krantikari Morcha (SKM) from Sangha constituency in the 2014 Sikkim Legislative Assembly election. He won and beat the candidate of ruling party Sikkim Democratic Front (SDF).

In December 2015, 7 SKM Members of Sikkim Legislative Assembly defected to the ruling party SDF, but 2 other MLAs of SKM, Sonam Lama and Kunga Nima Lepcha stayed with their party.

Sonam Lama stood as the SKM candidate from Sangha again. He won the seat and beat the SDF candidate by 26.52% margin. He was appointed to the Minister of Rural Management & Development, Panchayati Raj & Cooperative and Ecclesiastical affairs in P. S. Golay Cabinet.

== Electoral records ==
Sikkim Legislative Assembly election
Year	Constituency	Party	Result	Position	Votes	% Votes	% Margin	Deposit	Source
2014	Sangha	SKM	Won	1st/3	1,096	49.86	+5.75	refunded	
2019	Sangha	SKM	Won	1st/3	1,488	62.63	+26.52	refunded	
2024	Sangha	SKM	Won						
