= Sikkim Manipal University =

Private & public university in Sikkim, India

- Former names: Sikkim Manipal University of Health, Medical and Technological Sciences
- Motto in English: Inspired Learning
- Type: Private
- Established: 1995; 31 years ago
- Academic affiliations: UGC, NAAC, AIU, NMC, AICTE
- Chancellor: Governor of Sikkim
- Vice-Chancellor: Dr. Muralidhar V. Pai
- Location: Gangtok, Sikkim, India; 27.317°N 88.597°E
- Campus: 35 acres, Suburban / Rural
- Colours: Maroon and Black
- Website: smu.edu.in

Sikkim Manipal University (SMU) is a private university in Gangtok, India, first established in 1995 as the Sikkim Manipal University of Health, Medical and Technological Sciences, and adopted its current name in 2010.

== SMU Ghana ==
SMU Ghana was established in 2007 by KnowledgeWorkz Ltd - Ghana as Ghana's maiden Authorized Study centre of Sikkim Manipal University, India. It is Located at the Ring Road Central opposite Provident Towers in Accra.

SMU Ghana Learning Centre offers bachelor's and master's degrees programs in the following departments:

1. Department of IT (Information Technology)
2. Department of Management
3. Department of Journalism & Mass Communication

The Centre has an alumni base of more than 1000 students from Ghana, Nigeria, Liberia and other West African countries, including French & English speaking nationals.

SMU started its online university programs since 2023, where bachelor's and master's degree programs in arts, commerce, and computer science are offered.

== Notable alumni ==
- Satyarup Siddhanta B.Tech. (2008)
- Pamin Lepcha MBA (2008)
- Eleanor Nabwiso, Ugandan actress

== See also ==
- List of universities in India
