= Tashiding =

- Town
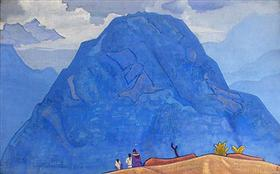
- Mountain view of Tashiding in Gyalshing district of Sikkim, India

- Location in Sikkim, India Tashiding (India)
- Coordinates: 27.307°N 88.28°E
- Country: India
- State: Sikkim
- District: Gyalshing
- Elevation: 1,246 m (4,088 ft)

Languages
  - Official: Sikkimese, Nepali, Lepcha, Limbu, Newari, Rai, Gurung, Mangar, Sherpa, Tamang and Sunwar
- Time zone: UTC+5:30 (IST)
- PIN: 737 111
- Vehicle registration: SK
- Nearest city: Gyalshing
- Sex ratio: 989 ♂/♀
- Literacy: 84.78%
- Vidhan Sabha constituency: Yuksom-Tashiding
- Climate: sub tropical to alpine (Köppen)

Tashiding is a small town on a hilltop at about 27 km from Gyalshing city in Gyalshing district of Sikkim in the Eastern Himalaya of India. Tashiding means "The Devoted Central Glory". This village is about 250 m above sea level with a sub-tropical climate. It is around 40 kilometer far away from district headquarter of Gyalshing. In electoral roll of 2011, Tashiding comes under the Assembly Constituency of Yuksom-Tashiding.

== Etymology ==
The legends of the village says that the name Tashiding means "The Devoted Central Glory". It represents the Nyingmapa order of Tibetan Buddhism and has been a center of worship in the Kingdom of Sikkim since the 1700s.

== Population composition ==
In Tashiding village, most of the village population is from Schedule Tribe (ST). Schedule Tribe (ST) constitutes 51.76% while Schedule Caste (SC) were 13.67% of total population in Tashiding village.

== Tashiding data ==
According to the 2011 Census, Tashiding data are as under:

Particulars	Total	Male	Female
1. Total No. of Houses	281		
2. Population	1,478	762	716
3. Child (0-6)	159	73	86
4. Schedule Caste	202	109	93
5. Schedule Tribe	765	385	380
6. Literacy	75.66 %	81.28 %	69.52 %
7. Total Workers	650	412	238
8. Main Worker	623	0	0
9. Marginal Worker	27	10	17

== Work profile ==
In Tashiding village out of total population, 650 were engaged in work activities. 95.85% of workers describe their work as Main Work (Employment or Earning more than 6 Months) while 4.15% were involved in Marginal activity providing livelihood for less than 6 months. Of 650 workers engaged in Main Work, 389 were cultivators (owner or co-owner) while 56 were Agricultural labourer.
