= 1970 Sikkimese general election =

- 9 and 14 April 1970

18 of the 24 seats in the State Council
| | Majority party | Minority party | Third party |
|---|---|---|---|
| Party | SNP | SSC | SNC |
| Last election | 5 | 2 | 8 |
| Seats won | 8 | 4 | 3 |
| Seat change | ▲3 | ▲2 | ▼5 |

General elections were held in Sikkim in April 1970 to elect members of the State Council. The Sikkim National Party emerged as the largest party, winning eight of the 24 seats.

== Results ==
| Party | Seats | +/– |
|---|---|---|
| Sikkim National Party | 8 | +3 |
| Sikkim State Congress | 4 | +2 |
| Sikkim National Congress | 3 | –5 |
| Others | 3 | 0 |
| Appointed members | 6 | 0 |
| Total | 24 | 0 |
Source: Hamlet Bareh

=== Constituency-wise ===
| # | Constituency | Reservation | Name | Party |
|---|---|---|---|---|
| 1 | East | Bhutia-Lepcha | Martam Topden | Sikkim National Party |
| 2 | East | Bhutia-Lepcha | Nima Tenzing | Sikkim National Party |
| 3 | East | Sikkimese Nepali | Nahakul Pradhan | Sikkim State Congress |
| 4 | South | Bhutia-Lepcha | Khunzang Dorji | Sikkim National Party |
| 5 | South | Sikkimese Nepali | Kalu Rai | Sikkim State Congress |
| 6 | South | Sikkimese Nepali | Bhagiman Rai | Sikkim National Congress |
| 7 | West | Bhutia-Lepcha | Thendup Tsering Bhutia | Sikkim National Congress |
| 8 | West | Sikkimese Nepali | Khagra Bahadur Khatiwara | Sikkim National Congress |
| 9 | West | Sikkimese Nepali | Bhim Bahadur Chettri | Sikkim State Congress |
| 10 | North | Bhutia-Lepcha | Nim Tsering Lepcha | Sikkim National Party |
| 11 | North | Bhutia-Lepcha | Netuk Tsering | Sikkim National Party |
| 12 | North | Sikkimese Nepali | Badrilal Pradhan | Sikkim State Congress |
| 13 | Gangtok | Bhutia-Lepcha | Ashok Tsering Bhutia | Sikkim National Party |
| 14 | Gangtok | Sikkimese Nepali | Harka Bahadur Basnett | Sikkim National Party |
| 15 | General | Sangha | Rinzing Chewang Lama | Independent |
| 16 | General | None | Lendhup Dorji Khangsarpa | Sikkim National Congress |
| 17 | General | SC | Nandalal Rasaily | Independent |
| 18 | General | Tsong | Padam Singh Tsong | Sikkim National Congress |
Source: Sikkim Darbar Gazette

=== Appointed Members ===
In addition to the elected members, six members were appointed to the Sikkim State Council by the Chogyal, which included: Y. Dorji Dahdul (Chief Secretary), M. M. Rasilly, R. S. Prasad, D. B. Chettri, Pinto Tashi and J. D. Pulger.

== Executive Council ==
From the elected members, the Chogyal appointed six to the Executive Council.

| Name | Responsibilities |
|---|---|
| Martam Topden | Education, Press & Publicity |
| Nahakul Pradhan | Health & Medical |
| Lendhup Dorji Khangsarpa | Agriculture & Animal Husbandry, Transport |
| Ashok Tsering Bhutia | Excise, Forests |
| Harka Bahadur Basnett | Bazar |
| Kalu Rai | Public Works |
