= Tshering Wangdi Lepcha =

Indian politician

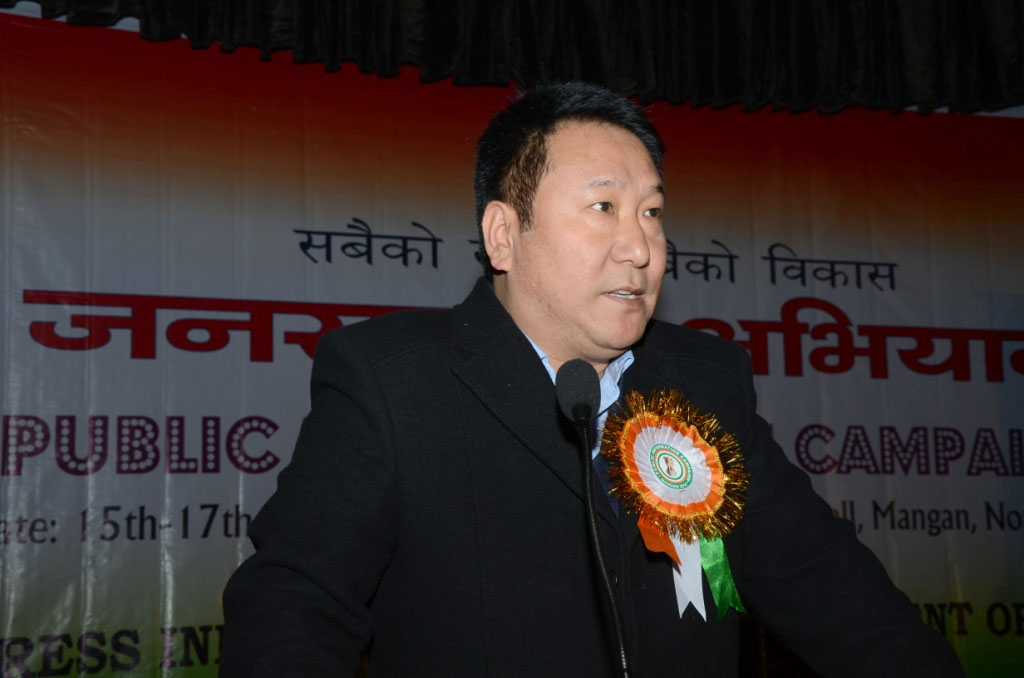
- Public Information Campaign at Mangan on December 2014

Member of Sikkim Legislative Assembly
- In office 2009–2019
- Preceded by: Constituency established
- Succeeded by: Samdup Lepcha
- Constituency: Lachen-Mangan

Personal details
- Party: Sikkim Democratic Front

Tshering Wangdi Lepcha is a Sikkim Democratic Front politician from Sikkim. He was elected in Sikkim Legislative Assembly election in 2009 and 2014 from Lachen-Mangan constituency as candidate of Sikkim Democratic Front. He was minister of Forest, Environment & Wildlife Management, Mines, Minerals & Geology and Science & Technology in Pawan Chamling fifth ministry from 2014 to 2019.
