= Sikkim Himali Congress =

The Sikkim Himali Congress was a political party in Sikkim. The party was founded after a split from the Sikkim Congress (Revolutionary), by SC(R) dissidents Dorjee Tshering (SC(R) vice president), S.K. Rai (former Member of Parliament) and P.B. Subba. The party was bankrolled by M.K. Subba, a businessman in Assam. The support for the party came mainly from the Matwali community.

The party contested the 1985 legislative assembly election in alliance with the Akhil Bharatiya Gorkha League, the Sikkim Prajatantra Congress and various independents.
