= State Council (Sikkim) =

Abolished legislature of the Kingdom of Sikkim

Sikkim State Council
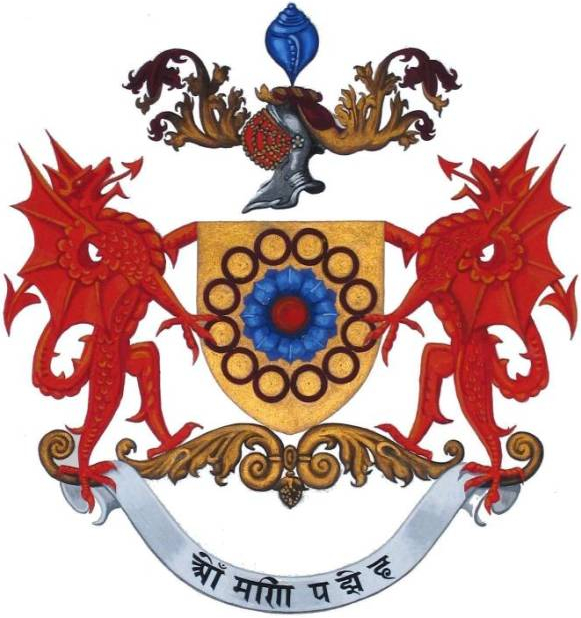
- Emblem of Sikkim

Type
- Type: Unicameral

History
- Disbanded: 1975
- Succeeded by: Sikkim Legislative Assembly

Structure
- Seats: 32
- Length of term: 3 years

Elections
- State Council voting system: First-past-the-post
- First State Council election: 1953
- Last State Council election: 1974

Meeting place
- Gangtok, Sikkim

Sikkim (in red) within South Asia (in pale yellow)

The State Council of Sikkim was the unicameral legislature of the former Kingdom of Sikkim, which was located in the Himalayas, between India and China.

There were six elections held for the council between 1953 and 1974. In 1975, after a referendum to abolish the monarchy, and the passing of the 36th amendment to the Indian constitution, the monarchy was abolished, along with the State Council. The territory of the kingdom was merged with India, becoming its 22nd state. The members of the State Council at the time, were deemed to be the Legislative Assembly of the newly formed state.

== Structure ==
The council was composed of some elected members and some nominated by the Chogyal. After the 1973 election, the composition was changed and the appointments by the Chogyal were eliminated, while at the same time the number of seats in the council was increased.

=== Executive Council ===
From among the State Council members, an Executive Council (equivalent to a cabinet of ministers) was chosen by the Chogyal. The Executive Council was presided over by the Dewan of Sikkim, and each member within it was given individual government responsibilities.

== History ==
The State Council of Sikkim existed since at least the late 19th century. It was an advisory and executive body, and was presided by the Chogyal (King). After the Independence of neighbouring India in August 1947, various political bodies in Sikkim began to demand greater say in the kingdom's administration. In 1952, the Chogyal conceded and announced new constituencies, for an election in 1953.

The Chogyal agreed to have 12 (out of 18) seats on the council, be electable. The other six were appointed by the Chogyal. Under a parity formula agreed upon by the political groups, six of the electable seats were to be for the Sikkim Nepalis and the other six for the Bhutia-Lepcha (BL) people. There were four constituencies drawn up of the kingdom, and elections were to be held in 1953. In the 1953 election, all the Nepali-reserved seats were won by the Sikkim National Party, while the BL-reserved seats were won by the Sikkim State Congress.

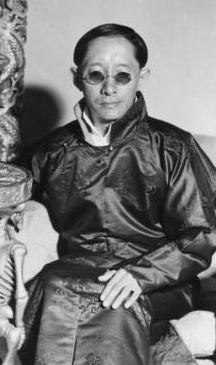
Chogyal Tashi Namgyal initiated proceedings for the first election to the Council, in 1953

Although the term of the Council was set as three years, the Chogyal decided to extend the term of the first Council, until 1958. Due to requests from the monastery associations, and other groups, the number of electable seats on the council was increased by two: one for the Sangha, to be voted on by the monks, and one seat that was not reserved for any particular group. In the elections of 1958, the Sikkim State Congress won an additional seat, while the unreserved seat was won by an Independent.

The second council's term was due to end in 1961, but the outbreak of the Sino-Indian war led to the extension of its term till 1967. Before the 1967 election, the constituencies were redrawn and increased to five, and four more electable seats were added to the council: one each for the Sikkim Nepalis and the Bhutia-Lepcha, one for the Tsong, and one for people of the Scheduled Castes.

After the 1973 elections, the Sikkim National Congress and Sikkim Janata Congress claimed that vote rigging took place in the South Sikkim constituency. They demanded that officials involved be arrested, but these demands were not met, leading to protests. The unrest led to the signing of a tripartite agreement, on 8 May, between the Choygal, Sikkimese political parties, and the government of India. The agreement led to the establishment of a government, supervised by a Chief Executive, who was nominated by the Indian government. It also necessitated another delimitation exercise, where the Chogyal-appointed seats in the council were abolished, the State Council was renamed to the Sikkim Assembly, and thirty-one new constituencies were drawn, along with one constituency for the monasteries (Sangha). Keeping to the parity formula of 1952, 15 of the constituencies were reserved for the Bhutia-Lepcha, and 15 for the Sikkim-Nepalis. The other remaining constituency was for the Scheduled Castes. The principle of "one-man one-vote" was applied. In the 1974 election, the Sikkim National Congress (which was in favour of Sikkim's merger with India), won an absolute majority with 31 of the 32 seats.

=== Final years (1974–75) ===
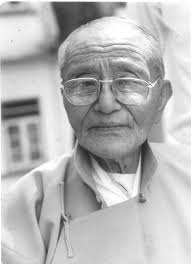
Kazi Lhendup Dorjee was the last head of the Council. On 16 May 1975, he was sworn in as the first Chief Minister of the new Legislative Assembly of Sikkim.

In May 1974, the council passed the Government of Sikkim Act, which provided for responsible government, and furthering relations with India. This was followed, in July, by them adopting a new constitution that provided for the country becoming a state of India. The Chogyal signed this constitution under pressure from the Indian government. The Indian Lok Sabha (lower house) then voted in favour of making Sikkim an "associate" state. The Rajya Sabha (upper house) voted for an amendment on 8 September, giving it a status equal to that of other states, and integrating it with the Indian Union. On 8 September, the Chogyal cited "widespread Sikkimese misgivings over the bill", and called for a free and fair referendum. The Sikkimese Students Association echoed his call for a referendum.

In March 1975, the Sikkim National Congress repeated its calls for integration into India, while the Chogyal again called for a referendum. On 9 April 1975, Indian troops entered the country, disarmed the palace guard (killing one of them) and surrounded the palace, putting the king under house arrest. The next day, the Council passed a Bill, declaring the office of the Chogyal as abolished, and called for a referendum on this issue, which was scheduled to be held four days later. On 14 April, the referendum took place, resulting in more than 97% of the votes in favor of abolishing the monarchy. On 26 April the Indian parliament passed the 36th amendment to the constitution, which transformed Sikkim from an Indian protectorate to a new state within the Indian union.

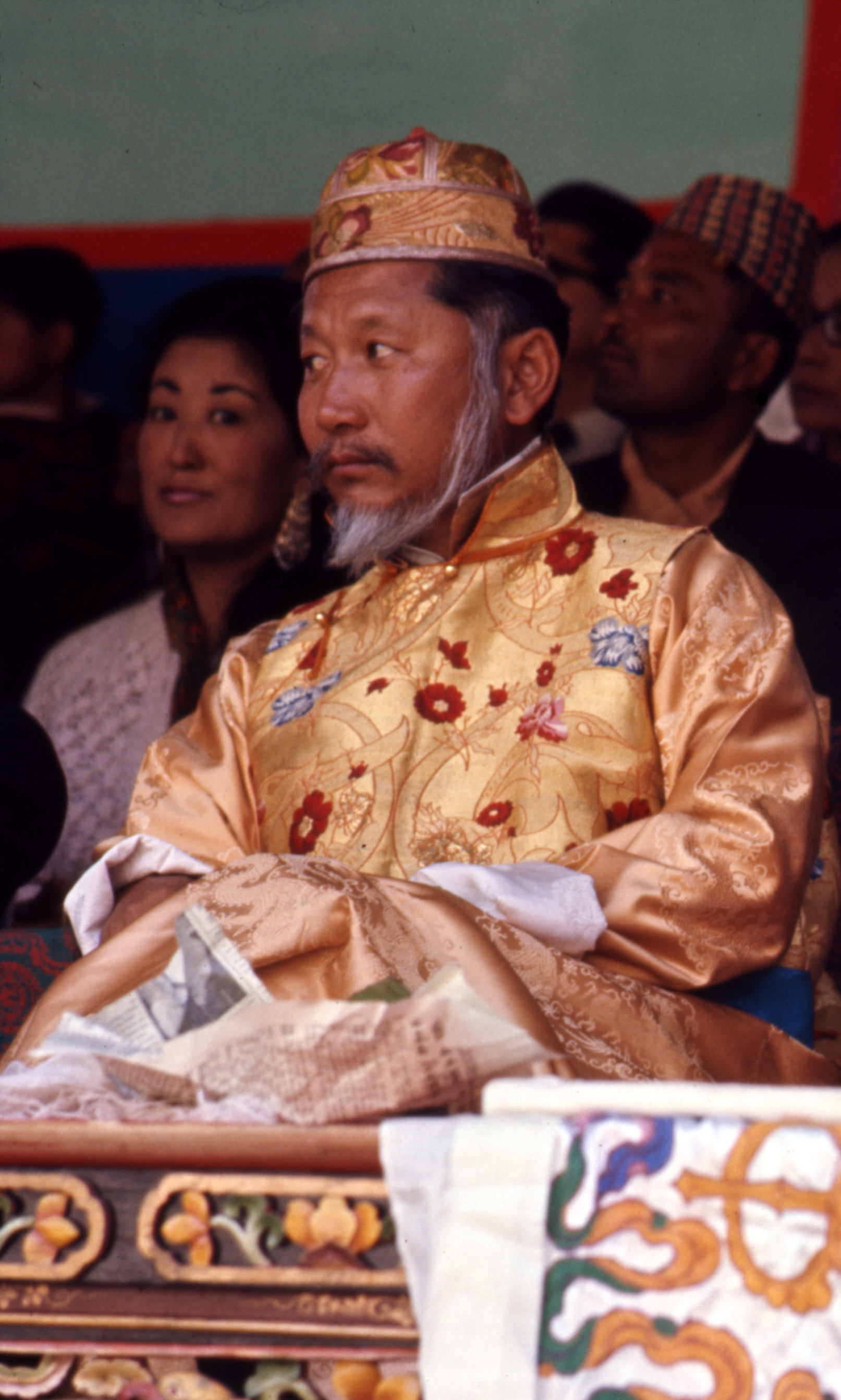
Palden Thondup Namgyal was the last Chogyal of Sikkim. He was deposed on 15 May 1975.

On 15 May, the Indian President Fakhruddin Ali Ahmed ratified the constitutional amendment (36th) that made Sikkim the 22nd state of India, and abolished the position of the Chogyal. The State Council was considered to be dissolved, and its members were deemed to be the new Legislative Assembly of Sikkim. Following this, B. B. Lal took charge as the Governor of the state on 16 May.

=== Electoral history ===
Electoral history of the Sikkim State Council
Election Year	Pro-Independence		Pro-Merger (Note: Includes Sikkim State Congress, Sikkim Janata Congress, and the Sikkim National Congress into which the rest eventually merged)	Other/ Unknown	Total
Election Year	Appointed	SNP	Pro-Merger	Other/ Unknown	Total
1953	6	6	6	0	18
1958	6	6	7	1	20
1967	6	5	10	3	24
1970	6	8	7	3	24
1973	6	9	7	2	24
1974	0	1	31	0	32

== Constituencies ==
Changes in the constituencies of the Sikkim State Council
Year	Details	Constituencies	Seats					Elections
Year	Details	Constituencies	Nepali	BL	Others	Appointed	Total	Elections
1952	Elections were announced for a new State Council, with 12 (out of 18) elected members.	4	6	6	0	6	18	1953
1958	Seats in the State Council were increased to 20.	4	6	6	2 (Note: Sangha, General)	6	20	1958
1966	The "Representation of Sikkim Subjects Regulation, 1966" was passed. The number of constituencies in the council was increased to 5.	5	7	7	4 (Note: Sangha, Tsong, SC, General)	6	24	1967, 1970 and 1973
1974	"The Government of Sikkim Act, 1974" was passed. Multi-seat constituencies were eliminated.	32	15	15	2 (Note: Sangha, SC)	0	32	1974

== See also ==
- History of Sikkim#Independent monarchy
- List of heads of government of the Kingdom of Sikkim
- Bombay Legislative Assembly
- Tripura Territorial Council

New institution	Sikkim State Council; 1953–1975	Succeeded by Sikkim Legislative Assembly
