= Pamin Lepcha =

Indian politician

Member of Sikkim Legislative Assembly
- Incumbent
- Assumed office 1 June 2024
- Preceded by: Dorjee Tshering Lepcha
- Constituency: Gnathang-Machong

Personal details
- Born: 1985 (age 40–41)
- Party: Sikkim Krantikari Morcha
- Parent: Dorjee Tshering Lepcha (father)
- Education: Sikkim Manipal Institute of Technology (MBA)

Pamin Lepcha is an Indian politician from Sikkim belonging from the Sikkim Krantikari Morcha. She is a member of the Legislative Assembly in the 11th Sikkim Legislative Assembly. She won over SDF's Tshering Wangi Lepcha with a margin of 3807 votes.

== Education ==
She graduated from Sikkim Manipal Institute of Technology with an MBA in 2008.
