= Kashiraj Pradhan =

Politician and journalist in the Kingdom of Sikkim

Member of the Sikkim State Council
- In office 1953–1967
- Preceded by: New constituency
- Succeeded by: Constituency abolished
- Constituency: Namchi

Kashiraj Pradhan (11 December 1905 – 31 March 1990) popularly known as Kashi Babu was an Sikkimese pre-merger politician and journalist. He was the President of Sikkim State Congress party, a member of the Sikkim State Council and Executive Council of Sikkim serving multiple terms in office. Known as the Father of Sikkimese journalism, he was the founder and publisher of Sikkim's first news magazine Kanchenjunga.

== Early life and education ==
Pradhan was born in the family of the aristocratic Newar Taksaris in Pakyong, East Sikkim. His parents were Babu Kaluram Pradhan and Bhadralakshmi Pradhan. His paternal grandfather was Thikadar Taksari Chandrabir Maskey of Pakyong, who was a Sikkimese feudal lord of Pakyong, Pendam and other estates in the former Kingdom of Sikkim. He received his early education in Sikkim, thereafter he went to high school in a government school in Darjeeling and completed his matriculation from Calcutta University in 1923. He completed his intermediate (I.A) from Banaras Hindu University (B.H.U) in the 1924, in arts. Thereafter, he graduated from Calcutta University in Arts. He was amongst the first few graduates from Sikkim.

== Career ==
In 1933, he became a teacher in the Sir Tashi Namgyal high school. Between 1942 and 1947 he was the headmaster of Sir Tashi Namgyal High School. He also started a business exporting Sikkim oranges and cardamom to Calcutta (present day Kolkata). He was a leader of the pro-democracy movement in the erstwhile Kingdom of Sikkim. In the Sikkim State Council, he held important cabinet positions including that of Executive Councilor (equivalent to cabinet minister). He was a member of the Sikkim State Congress, a party he led for many years.

By late 1950s to the 1970s the Sikkim State Congress was led by him or his nephew Nahakul Pradhan both serving as President of the party in different decades. Under their leadership the party greatly moderated it's anti-Chogyal stand and participated in the Royal Sikkimese administration through subsequent wins in elections to the State Council.

He was also a journalist, who started Sikkim's first monthly news magazine, Kanchenjunga in 1957 with his nephew Nahakul Pradhan as its editor. Known as Father of Sikkimese Journalism, the state government of Sikkim has instituted Kashiraj Pradhan Lifetime Journalism Award for journalists since 2018.

== Honours ==
- Pema Dorji Decoration - Presented by the Chogyal of Sikkim, third-highest civilian honour in the former Kingdom of Sikkim.
- Government of Sikkim has named Deorali - Namnang road as Kashiraj Pradhan Marg.
- Bhanu Puraskar - On 13 July 1998, the Nepali Sahitya Parishad Sikkim awarded him with the first Bhanu Puraskar.
