= Organization of Sikkimese Unity =

Political party in India

Organization of Sikkimese Unity is a political organization in the Indian state of Sikkim. OSU was founded in 1994 to fight for the reinstallment of reservation quotas for the Nepali-speaking majority of the state. The general secretary of OSU is Jigme N Kazi.
