= Sikkim Independent Front =

Indian political party

Sikkim Independent Front is a political party in Sikkim, founded by Ruth Karthak Lepchani in 1966. The party was formed to fight for the interests of the Lepcha people. In the 1967 state council elections the party launched six candidates (five Lepchas and one Nepali), but none were elected.

The party was repressed by the Sikkim government; the government accused Lepchani of spreading rumours against the monarchy and she was forced into exile.
