= Brajbir Saran Das =

Indian politician

Brajbir Saran Das (15 December 1925 – 14 October 2016) was an Indian diplomat in the state of Sikkim. He served as a Chief administrative officer from April 9, 1973 until July 23, 1974. He was awarded the Padma Shri in 1972. He died in October 2016 at the age of 90. His grandson is Indian comedian, Vir Das.

== Bibliography ==
- Das, Brajbir Saran (2010). Memoirs of an Indian Diplomat. Tata McGraw Hill Education Private Limited. ISBN 978-0071332835.
