= Sikkim Janata Party =

- Founder: Lal Bahadur Basnet
- Founded: 1969
- Dissolved: 1972
- Merged into: Sikkim Janata Congress
- Colours: Blue

Sikkim Janata Party was a political party in Sikkim. The party was founded in Gangtok on 18 December 1969 founded by Lal Bahadur Basnet. The party was formed after a split in the Sikkim National Congress. Basnet, a well-known journalist and former general secretary of the Sikkim National Congress, served as the president of the party. K.C. Pradhan was the general secretary of the party.

Ideologically the party was committed to socialism, democracy and the unity of the Sikkimese people. The party was active in the struggle for democratic reforms. It demanded Sikkim adopt a written constitution.

The party was mainly supported by Nepali community. The party suffered from weak organization and lack of financial backing. The party contested four seats in the fourth general election of 1970. Basnet had himself contested two seats in the election. Compared to other opposition parties, the Sikkim Janata Party took more radical postures. During the election campaign the party called for revision of the 1950 India-Sikkim Peace Treaty, calling for greater autonomy for Sikkim (positions shared with the Sikkim National Congress and the Sikkim State Congress). The party condemned the 1950 treaty as a 'slander on Sikkim'.

Karma Lama of the Sikkim Janata Party contested the Sangha seat, finishing in second place with 46 votes (10.31%).

Following the election, in which the party failed to win any seats, Basnet resigned from the party presidency and left the party. Another key leader of the party, B.B. Gurung, also renounced his membership. After these departures, K.C. Pradhan became the main leader of the party.

On 15 August 1972 SJP reached an agreement with the Sikkim State Congress to merge the two parties. The merger was completed on 26 October 1972, with the formation of the Sikkim Janata Congress.
