= Sikkim State Congress =

- Founded: 1947
- Dissolved: 1972
- Merged into: Sikkim Janata Congress
- Ideology: Abolishment of Landlordism, One Man One Vote, Annexation of Kingdom of Sikkim with India
- Colours: Blue

The Sikkim State Congress, or SSC, was an annexationist political party in the Kingdom of Sikkim. It was founded in 1947 and worked closely with the Indian National Congress (INC) to successfully achieve the annexation of Sikkim to India. Other parties established by the INC to serve India's interests in its near abroad included the Nepal State Congress Party and the Bhutan State Congress Party.

== History ==
Sikkim State Congress was formed on 7th December 1947 after localised organisations Praja Sudharak Samaj, Praja Sammelan and Praja Mandal jointly decided to form a unified party. Tashi Tshering was the President of the newly formed party. The SSC's main constituents were Nepalese, while its opponent, the Sikkim National Party, had support among the Bhutia and Lepcha people. It campaigned to change the election system from a confessional system to a "one man, one vote" system. When that reform happened in 1974, the numerically superior Nepalese made the Congress Sikkim's dominant political party. Some anti-clerical and other modernizing elites within the Bhutia-Lepcha community joined the Sikkim State Congress, because of its desire to abolish landlordism. Kazi Lhendup Dorjee, one of these, was president of the party between 1953 and 1958.

Tashi Tshering, Gobardhan Pradhan, DB Tiwari, CD Rai, DS Lepcha, Sonam Tshering, LD Kazi, Roy Choudhary and Helen Lepcha were among the founder members of the party. Tashi Tshering, Kashiraj Pradhan, Nahakul Pradhan and Chandra Das Rai were other prominent leaders who led the party before the merger with India.

After the formation of the Congress, Tshering organised its first public meeting in 7 December 1947 at Gangtok demanding abolishing landlordism, forming an interim government and accession to India. The Congress started fresh agitation in February,1949 demanding the formation of an interim government and democratic reforms following which Chandra Das Rai and five others were arrested. This was followed by Congress supporters encircling the Palace on 1 May, 1949. On 8 May 1949, Chogyal appointed Sikkim's first interim government led by Chief Minister Tashi Tshering and his popular ministry. However the government was dismissed within 29 days by the Indian Political Officer Harishwar Dayal.

By late 1950s to the 1970s the party was led by Kashiraj Pradhan and his nephew Nahakul Pradhan, both serving as President of the party in different decades. Under their leadership the party greatly moderated it’s anti-Chogyal stand and participated in the Royal Sikkimese administration through subsequent wins in elections to the State Council. By the early 1970s, Nahakul Pradhan led party demanded for a responsible government under the Chogyal opposing the demands of Kazi Lhendup Dorjee led Sikkim National Congress. The party was part of Sikkimese administration throughout the pre merger period with subsequent wins in all elections to the State council. Later SSC merged with Sikkim Janata Party in 1972, forming the Sikkim Janata Congress.

== Electoral history ==
Election	Seats won	Seats +/-	Source
1953	6 / 18	-	
1958	7 / 20	▲1	
1967	2 / 24	▼5	
1970	4 / 24	▲2	

== See also ==
- History of Sikkim
