= List of political officers in the Kingdom of Sikkim =

Flag of the Kingdom of Sikkim from 1967 to 1975.

Map of Sikkim.

This article lists the political officers in the Kingdom of Sikkim from 1889 to 1975. Until 1947, political officers were British and acted as local representatives of the British Empire and British Raj. Following its independence in 1947, India continued to appoint its own political officers until 1975, when Sikkim became the 22nd state of India following a referendum. The officer also oversaw British trade agencies in Tibet.

== List ==
(Dates in italics indicate de facto continuation of office)

| No. | Portrait | Name | Term | Notes |
British Political Officers
| 1 | | John Claude White | 1889 – April 1908 | |
| 2 | | Charles Alfred Bell | September 1906 – January 1907 | Acting for White |
| 3 | | Charles Alfred Bell | April 1908 – April 1918 | 1st time |
| 4 | | James Leslie Rose Weir | 10 August 1911 – 8 November 1911 | Acting for Bell |
| 5 | | Basil Gould | 13 October 1913 – 5 October 1914 | Acting for Bell |
| 6 | | William L. Campbell | April 1918 – January 1920 | Acting to March 1919 |
| 7 | | Charles Alfred Bell | January 1920 – December 1920 | 2nd time |
| 8 | | John Bartley | 7 December 1920 – 24 January 1921 | Acting |
| 9 | | William Frederick Travers O'Connor | January 1921 – March 1921 | 1st time, acting |
| 10 | | David Macdonald | March 1921 – 18 June 1921 | |
| 11 | | Frederick Marshman Bailey | 19 June 1921 – 6 June 1926 | 1st time |
| 12 | | Frederick Williamson | 7 June 1926 – 16 December 1926 | 1st time, acting |
| 13 | | Frederick Marshman Bailey | 16 December 1926 – 16 October 1928 | 2nd time |
| 14 | | James Leslie Rose Weir | 16 October 1928 – 2 April 1931 | 1st time |
| 15 | | Frederick Williamson | 3 April 1931 – August 1931 | 2nd time, acting |
| 16 | | James Leslie Rose Weir | 5 November 1931 – 3 January 1933 | 2nd time |
| 17 | | Frederick Williamson | 4 January 1933 – 17 November 1935 | 3rd time |
| 18 | | Richmond Keith Molesworth Battye | 18 November 1935 – 22 December 1935 | Acting |
| 19 | | Basil Gould | 22 December 1935 – May 1937 | 1st time |
| 20 | | Hugh Edward Richardson | May 1937 – November 1937 | Acting |
| 21 | | Basil Gould | November 1937 – June 1945 | 2nd time. From 1941, Sir Basil Gould |
| 22 | | Arthur John Hopkinson | June 1945 – 14 August 1947 | |
Indian Political Officers
| 23 | | Arthur John Hopkinson | 15 August 1947 – 1948 | |
| 24 | | Harishwar Dayal | 1948–1952 | |
| 25 | | Balraj Krishna Kapur | March 1952 – 1955 | |
| 26 | | Apa Parshuram Rao Pant | 1955–1961 | |
| 27 | | Inder Jeet Bahadur Singh | 23 October 1961 – December 1963 | |
| 28 | | Avtar Singh | 1964–1966 | |
| 29 | | Vincent Herbert Coelho | 1966 – 21 June 1967 | |
| 30 | | Nedyam Balachandran Menon | 3 July 1967 – May 1970 | |
| 31 | | Inder Sen Chopra | 1970 – July 1972 | |
| 32 | | Kayatyani Shankar Bajpai | 1972–1974 | |
| 33 | | Gurbachan Singh | 1974 – 16 May 1975 | |

== See also ==
- Chogyal
- List of heads of government of the Kingdom of Sikkim
- History of Sikkim
