= Bhutia-Lepcha =

Sikkimese people of Tibetan ancestry

Total population
- 112,507

Regions with significant populations
- Sikkim, India: 112,507 (2011 census)

Languages
- Sikkimese, Nepali, Dzongkha, Tibetan, Lepcha

Religion
- Buddhism, Bön, Mun

Bhutia-Lepcha is an ethnic grouping consisting of people of the Bhutia and Lepcha communities in Sikkim, India. Both these groups are listed as Scheduled Tribes by the Government of India.

After the implementation of the recommendations of the Delimitation Commission, in 2002, 12 (out of 32) seats have been reserved for this group in the Sikkim Legislative Assembly.

== Reservation within Sikkim ==
Reservation for the Bhutia-Lepcha (BL) people started with the 1953 Sikkimese general election with 6 (out of 18) seats reserved in the Sikkim State Council. This was changed to 7 (out of 24) seats by the time of the 1970 Sikkimese general election. The reservation was further increased to 15 (out of 32) seats in the first election to be based on universal suffrage in 1974. As of 2006, there are 12 seats (out of 32) reserved for the BL in the Sikkim Legislative Assembly.

== Sikkim Bhutia Lepcha Apex Committee ==
The Sikkim Bhutia Lepcha Apex Committee (SIBLAC) is a group striving for the political rights of ethnic groups of Sikkimese, Bhutia-Lepcha (BL) and Nepalis of Sikkimese origin. In addition to the reservation for the BL in the Legislative Assembly of Sikkim, they argue for reservation in local body (panchayat) elections as well.

== Legal battles ==
In 1993, a case was brought in the Supreme Court of India, challenging the reservation for the BL constituencies and for the Sangha constituency in Sikkim, by Ram Chandra Poudyal of the Rising Sun Party. The five-judge bench of the Supreme Court, dismissed the petition, judging that the reservations (or their quantity) aren't violating articles 14, 170(2) or 332 of the Constitution.

In 2015, a petition was brought to the Sikkim High Court by Mr. Phigu Tshering Bhutia arguing for reassigning reservation for the Bhuti-Lepcha as well as for the Limboo-Tamang (LT), in the upcoming municipal elections, in Sikkim. The judge, Meenakshi Madan Rai, dismissed the petition, while upholding the precedent where reservation in electoral constituencies aren't subject to the scrutiny of any court of law.

== See also ==
- Indigenous peoples of Sikkim
- List of constituencies of the Sikkim Legislative Assembly
- Scheduled Tribes
- Reserved political positions in India
