= Sikkim National Party =

Sikkim political party, 1950 to 1977

- Founder: Netuk Lama
- Founded: 1950
- Dissolved: 1977
- Ideology: Pro-independence for the Kingdom of Sikkim
- Colours: Orange

Election symbol

Sikkim National Party was a political party in the Kingdom of Sikkim, formed in 1950. The Sikkim National Party was in favour of the monarchy and advocated independence for Sikkim. The party was founded to counter the growing influence of the pro-Indian parties Sikkim State Congress and Rajya Praja Sammelan, that had been formed after the independence of India in 1947.

In the last elections for the Sikkim State Council before the fall of the monarchy in 1975, NP only won the seat of Kabi-Tingda (the sole seat not won by Dorjee's unified Congress party).

== Electoral history ==
Election	Seats won	Seats +/-	Source
1953	6 / 18		
1958	6 / 20	-	
1967	5 / 24	▼1	
1970	8 / 24	▲3	
1973	9 / 24	▲1	
1974	1 / 32	▼8	
