= Sikkim Janata Congress =

Sikkim political party

- Founded: 1972
- Dissolved: 1973
- Merged into: Sikkim National Congress
- Colours: Blue

Sikkim Janata Congress (translation: Sikkim Popular Congress) was a political party in Sikkim, active in the struggle for democratic reforms. The SJC was founded when the Sikkim State Congress and Sikkim Janata Party merged, in October 1972. K.C. Pradhan was its president.

In 1973, the SJC merged with Dorjee's Sikkim National Congress.

== Electoral history ==
Election	Seats won	Seats +/-	Source
1973	2 / 24	New	
