= Sikkim Legislative Assembly =

Unicameral legislature of the state of Sikkim

- 11th Sikkim Assembly

Type
- Type: Unicameral
- Term limits: 5 years

History
- Founded: 4 May 1974 (52 years ago)
- Preceded by: Sikkim State Council

Leadership
- Governor: Dushyant Kumar Gautam
- Speaker: Mingma Narbu Sherpa, SKM since 12 June 2024
- Deputy Speaker: Raj Kumari Thapa, SKM since 12 June 2024
- Chief Minister (Leader of the House): Prem Singh Tamang, SKM since 27 May 2019

Structure
- Seats: 32
- Political groups: Government SKM (32) Opposition Vacant (Note: All seats belong to the ruling Sikkim Krantikari Morcha.)

Elections
- Voting system: First past the post
- Last election: 19 April 2024
- Next election: 2029

Meeting place
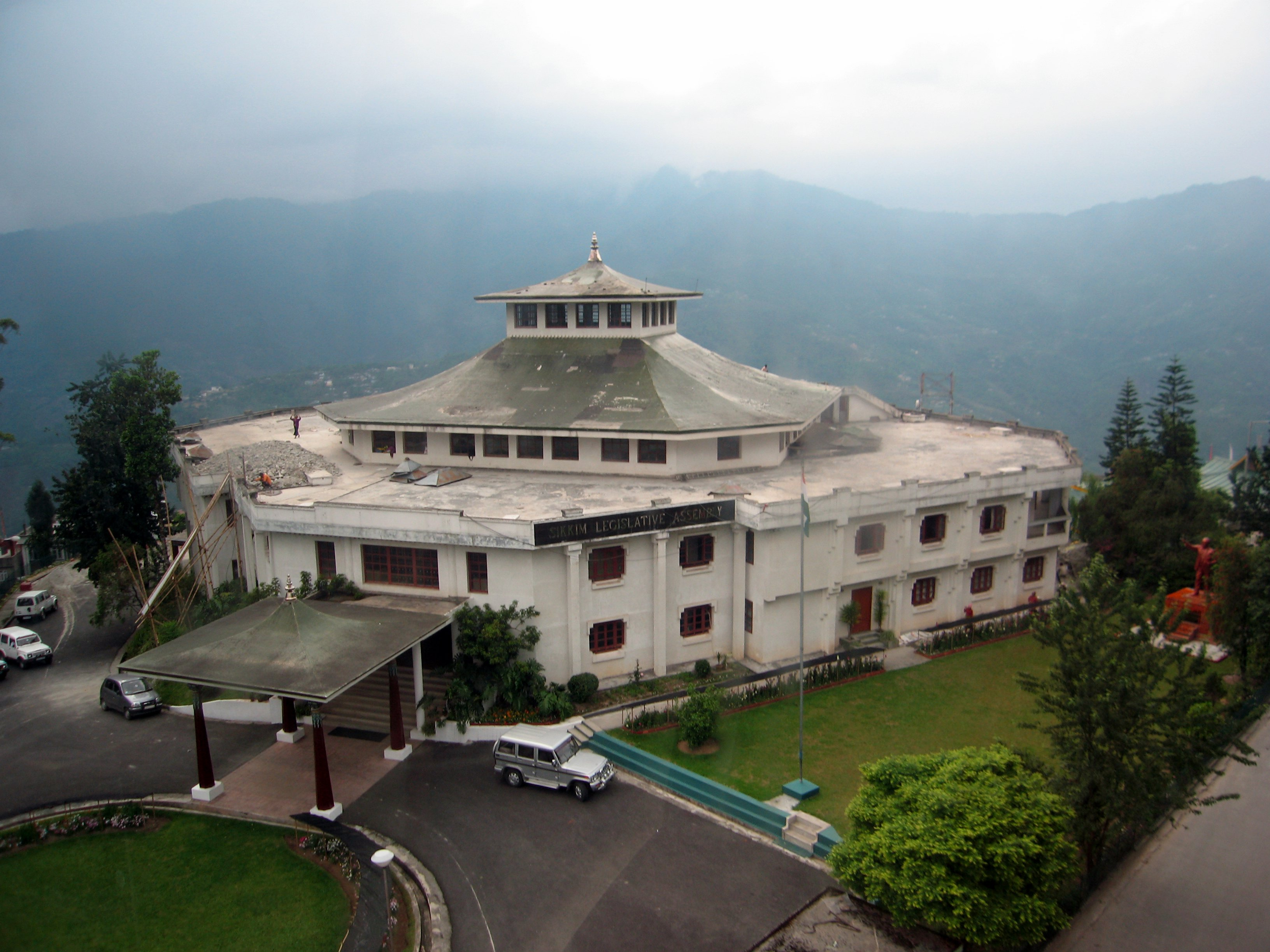
- Sikkim Legislative Assembly, Gangtok, Sikkim, India

Website
- Sikkim Legislative Assembly

The Sikkim Legislative Assembly is the unicameral state legislature of Sikkim state in north-eastern India. The seat of the Legislative Assembly is at Gangtok, the capital of the Sikkim state.

== History ==
Sikkim became the 22nd state of India by the 36th Amendment of the Indian Constitution in 1975. The Act provides that the Legislative Assembly of Sikkim shall consist of not less than thirty two members and that "the Assembly of Sikkim formed as a result of the elections held in Sikkim in April 1974 with 32 members elected in the said elections (hereinafter referred to as the sitting members) shall be deemed to be the legislative Assembly of the State of Sikkim duly constituted under the Constitution."

Sikkim is situated in the North East of India and has a geographical area of 7,096 square kilometres (2,740 sq mi) and a population of 6.1 lakhs. It was a tiny Himalayan kingdom, ruled by a hereditary monarchy for about 3 centuries from the 17 century CE to 1975. In 1950, the kingdom became a protectorate of the Government of India, and was vested with autonomy in its internal affairs while its defense, communications and external relations became the responsibility of India. The kingdom finally opted to become full-fledged state of the Indian Union with effect from 26 April 1975.

Kazi Lhendup Dorjee was the first Chief Minister of Sikkim state from 1975 to 1979. Nar Bahadur Bhandari and Pawan Kumar Chamling served long terms as Chief Minister. As of the 2024 Sikkim Legislative Assembly election, Prem Singh Tamang is the Chief Minister of Sikkim.

== Structure ==
Map of constituencies of Sikkim Vidhan Sabha

There are 32 members in the legislative assembly. There are 12 seats reserved for BL Community of Sikkim. These scheduled tribes include ethnic tribes such as Bhutia, Lepcha (Sherpa), Limbu, Tamang and other Sikkimese Nepali Communities, as specified during the merger of the Kingdom of Sikkim (monarchy) into India. 2 seats reserved for Scheduled Castes (SC). One seat (Sangha) is reserved for the Buddhist monastic community of Sikkim.

== Members of Legislative Assembly ==
The Eleventh assembly was elected in 2024 Sikkim Legislative Assembly election. The current members are listed below:

District	No.	Constituency	Name	Party	Remarks
Gyalshing	1	Yoksam–Tashiding (BL)	Tshering Thendup Bhutia	Sikkim Krantikari Morcha	
Gyalshing	2	Yangthang	Bhim Hang Limboo	Sikkim Krantikari Morcha	
Gyalshing	3	Maneybong–Dentam	Sudesh Kumar Subba	Sikkim Krantikari Morcha	
Gyalshing	4	Gyalshing–Barnyak	Lok Nath Sharma	Sikkim Krantikari Morcha	
Soreng	5	Rinchenpong (BL)	Erung Tenzing Lepcha	Sikkim Krantikari Morcha	
Soreng	6	Daramdin (BL)	Mingma Narbu Sherpa	Sikkim Krantikari Morcha	
Soreng	7	Soreng–Chakung	Prem Singh Tamang	Sikkim Krantikari Morcha	Resigned on 14 June 2024
Soreng	7	Soreng–Chakung	Aditya Tamang	Sikkim Krantikari Morcha	Elected unopposed in 2024 by-election
Soreng	8	Salghari–Zoom (SC)	Madan Cintury	Sikkim Krantikari Morcha	
Namchi	9	Barfung (BL)	Rikshal Dorjee Bhutia	Sikkim Krantikari Morcha	
Namchi	10	Poklok–Kamrang	Bhoj Raj Rai	Sikkim Krantikari Morcha	
Namchi	11	Namchi–Singhithang	Krishna Kumari Rai	Sikkim Krantikari Morcha	Resigned on 13 June 2024
Namchi	11	Namchi–Singhithang	Satish Chandra Rai	Sikkim Krantikari Morcha	Elected unopposed in 2024 by-election
Namchi	12	Melli	Nar Bahadur Pradhan	Sikkim Krantikari Morcha	
Namchi	13	Namthang–Rateypani	Sanjit Kharel	Sikkim Krantikari Morcha	
Namchi	14	Temi–Namphing	Bedu Singh Panth	Sikkim Krantikari Morcha	
Namchi	15	Rangang–Yangang	Raj Kumari Thapa	Sikkim Krantikari Morcha	
Namchi	16	Tumin–Lingee (BL)	Samdup Tshering Bhutia	Sikkim Krantikari Morcha	
Gangtok	17	Khamdong–Singtam	Nar Bahadur Dahal	Sikkim Krantikari Morcha	
Pakyong	18	West Pendam (SC)	Lall Bahadur Das	Sikkim Krantikari Morcha	
Pakyong	19	Rhenock	Prem Singh Tamang	Sikkim Krantikari Morcha	Chief Minister
Pakyong	20	Chujachen	Puran Kumar Gurung	Sikkim Krantikari Morcha	
Pakyong	21	Gnathang–Machong (BL)	Pamin Lepcha	Sikkim Krantikari Morcha	
Pakyong	22	Namchaybong	Raju Basnet	Sikkim Krantikari Morcha	
Gangtok	23	Shyari (BL)	Tenzing Norbu Lamtha	Sikkim Krantikari Morcha	Switch from SDF to SKM
Gangtok	24	Martam–Rumtek (BL)	Sonam Venchungpa	Sikkim Krantikari Morcha	
Gangtok	25	Upper Tadong	G.T. Dhungel	Sikkim Krantikari Morcha	
Gangtok	26	Arithang	Arun Kumar Upreti	Sikkim Krantikari Morcha	
Gangtok	27	Gangtok (BL)	Delay Namgyal Barfungpa	Sikkim Krantikari Morcha	
Gangtok	28	Upper Burtuk	Kala Rai	Sikkim Krantikari Morcha	
Mangan	29	Kabi–Lungchok (BL)	Thenlay Tshering Bhutia	Sikkim Krantikari Morcha	
Mangan	30	Djongu (BL)	Pintso Namgyal Lepcha	Sikkim Krantikari Morcha	
Mangan	31	Lachen–Mangan (BL)	Samdup Lepcha	Sikkim Krantikari Morcha	
Buddhist Monasteries	32	Sangha	Sonam Lama	Sikkim Krantikari Morcha	

== See also ==
- List of constituencies of the Sikkim Legislative Assembly
- List of chief ministers of Sikkim
- List of states of India by type of legislature
- Vidhan Sabha
