= Sikkim National Congress =

Former political party in the Kingdom of Sikkim

- Founder: Kazi Lhendup Dorji
- Founded: 1962
- Dissolved: 1977
- Merged into: Indian National Congress
- Ideology: Annexation of Kingdom of Sikkim with India
- Colours: Blue

Election symbol

Sikkim National Congress (abbr. SNC) was a political party in the Kingdom of Sikkim. It was founded in 1962, through a merger of Swatantra Dal, Rajya Praja Sammelan, and dissidents of the then-dominant parties, Sikkim State Congress and Sikkim National Party. Kazi Lhendup Dorjee was its leader.

The SNC was formed to be a party representing all ethnic groups in Sikkim, as the previously dominating parties were divided on ethnic lines. It opposed the monarchy in Sikkim and worked for democratic reforms.

In April 1973, Sikkim Janata Congress merged with SNC. In 1974, the first democratically elected government took office in Sikkim. In that election, the party won 31 out of 32 seats in the State Council.

After the merger of Sikkim with India in 1975, the party merged with the Indian National Congress.

== Electoral history ==
Election	Seats won	Seats +/-	Source
1967	8 / 24	-	
1970	3 / 24	▼5	
1973	5 / 24	▲2	
1974	31 / 32	▲26	
