= List of speakers of the Sikkim Legislative Assembly =

Presiding officer of Sikkim legislative assembly

Speaker of the Sikkim Legislative Assembly
- Seal of the state of Sikkim

- Flag of India
- Incumbent; Mingma Narbu Sherpa since 12 June 2024
- Sikkim Legislative Assembly
- Style: The Hon’ble (formal); Mr. Deputy Speaker (informal)
- Member of: Sikkim Legislative Assembly
- Reports to: Government of Sikkim
- Seat: Sikkim Legislative Assembly
- Appointer: Members of the Sikkim Legislative Assembly
- Term length: During the life of the vidhan Sabha (five years maximum)
- Constituting instrument: Article 93 of the Constitution of India
- Inaugural holder: Chatur Singh Rai
- Formation: 1974; 52 years ago
- Deputy: Raj Kumari Thapa
- Website: -

The Speaker of the Sikkim Legislative Assembly is the title given to the presiding officer (chair) of the Sikkim Legislative Assembly. The Speaker's official role is to moderate debate, make rulings on procedure, announce the results of votes, etc. The Speaker decides who may speak and has the powers to discipline members who break the procedures of the Assembly. The Speaker often also represents the body in person, as the voice of the body in ceremonial and some other situations. Many bodies also have a speaker pro tempore or deputy speaker, designated to fill in when the speaker is not available.

== Role in the Legislative Assembly ==
The Speaker presides over the sessions of the Legislative Assembly and conducts the business in the Assembly. He decides whether a bill is a money bill or a non-money bill. He maintains discipline and decorum in the Assembly and can punish a member for their unruly behaviour by suspending them. He permits the moving of various kinds of motions and resolutions like the motion of no confidence, motion of adjournment, motion of censure and calling attention notice as per the rules. The Speaker decides on the agenda to be taken up for discussion during the meeting. The date of election of the Speaker is fixed by the Governor.

Although the members of the Legislative Assembly represent their constituencies, the Speaker represents the whole Assembly.

While the office of Speaker is vacant, the duties of the office are performed by the Deputy Speaker or, if the office of Deputy Speaker is also vacant, by such member of the Assembly as the Governor may appoint for the purpose.

During the absence of the Speaker from any sitting of the Assembly the Deputy Speaker or, if he is also absent, such person as may be determined by the Assembly, or, if no such person is present, such other person as may be determined by the Assembly, shall act as Speaker.

== Election of the Speaker ==
In the Legislative Assembly, a simple majority vote in the Assembly in which all present members participate determine both the Speaker and the Deputy Speaker — the presiding officers — who are also its members.

The party in power proposes the name of their candidate after its candidate after titular hearings with Leaders of other Parties who are a part of the Assembly. This ensures that the Speaker is accepted by all political Parties belonging to the Assembly. The name of the candidate determined by the party in power is usually proposed by the Chief Minister or the Minister of Parliamentary Affairs. The pro-tem Speaker chairs the session in which the election for the post of the Speaker takes place.

The Deputy Speaker chairs sessions where the election takes place towards the end of Legislative Assembly. Once the election is over, the person who is presiding declares the chosen candidate to be Speaker of the Assembly, without latter motions being voted upon. Once the final tally of votes is declared, the Chief Minister and Leader of the Opposition escort the Speaker elect to the Chair. His speech, in which he thanks the Assembly, marks the start of the tenure of the new Speaker.

== Term of office ==
The term of office of the Speaker ranges from the day he is elected to the dissolution of the Legislative Assembly. When the Assembly is dissolved, the Speaker terminates his tenure as a member of the Assembly, but does not quit his position as Speaker. He stands eligible for re-election.

A member holding office as Speaker or Deputy Speaker of an Assembly shall vacate his office if his tenure as member of the Assembly is terminated; or may at any time by writing under his hand addressed, if such members is the Speaker, to the Deputy Speaker, and if such member is the Deputy Speaker, to the Speaker, resign his office; and may be removed from his office by a resolution of the Assembly provided that no resolution shall be moved unless at least fourteen days' notice has been given.

Further, whenever the Assembly is dissolved, the speaker shall not vacate his office until immediately prior to the Legislation Assembly's first meeting after the dissolution.

At any sitting of the Legislative Assembly, while any resolution for the removal of the Speaker from his office is under consideration, the Speaker, or while any resolution for the removal of the Deputy Speaker from his office is under consideration, the Deputy Speaker, shall not, though he is present, preside, and during the absence of the Speaker from any sitting of the Assembly the Deputy Speaker in relation to every such sitting as they apply in relation to a sitting from which the Speaker or, as the case may be, the Deputy Speaker, is absent.

The Speaker shall have the right to speak and take part in discussions in the Legislative Assembly while any resolution for his removal from office is under consideration in the Assembly and shall be entitled to vote only in the first instance on such resolution or on any other matter during such proceedings but not in the case of an equality of votes.

== List of speakers ==
Assembly	Election Year	Speaker	Political Party
1st	1974	Chatur Singh Rai	Sikkim National Congress
2nd	1979	Sonam Tshering	Sikkim Janata Parishad
3rd	1985	Tulshi Ram Sharma	Sikkim Sangram Parishad
4th	1989	Dorjee Tshering	Sikkim Sangram Parishad
5th	1994	Chakra Bahadur Subba	Sikkim Democratic Front
6th	1999	Kalawati Subba	Sikkim Democratic Front
7th	2004	D.N. Takarpa	Sikkim Democratic Front
8th	2009	K.T. Gyaltsen	Sikkim Democratic Front
9th	2014	Kedar Nath Rai	Sikkim Democratic Front
10th	2019	Lall Bahadur Das	Sikkim Krantikari Morcha
10th	2019	Arun Kumar Upreti	Sikkim Krantikari Morcha
11th	2024	Mingma Narbu Sherpa	Sikkim Krantikari Morcha

== List of deputy speakers ==
No.	Name	Elected constituency	Term of office		Assembly	Political party	Speaker
1	R. C. Poudyal	Loosing-Pachekhani Assembly constituency	1975	1977	1st (1974)	Sikkim National Congress	Chatur Singh Rai
2	Kalzang Gyatso	Kabi-Tingda Assembly constituency	1977	1979	1st (1974)	Sikkim National Party	Chatur Singh Rai
3	Lal Bahadur Basnet	Gangtok	1979	1985	2nd (1979)	Sikkim Janata Parishad	Sonam Tshering
4	Ram Lepcha	Pathing	1985	1989	3rd (1985)	Sikkim Sangram Parishad	Tulshi Ram Sharma
5	Bedu Singh Panth	Wak	December 1989	June 1994	4th (1989)	Sikkim Sangram Parishad	Dorjee Tshering
6	Dal Bahadur Gurung	Geyzing	29 December 1994	10 October 1999	5th (1994)	Sikkim Democratic Front	Chakra Bahadur Subba
7	Palden Lachungpa	Sangha	15 October 1999	21 May 2004	6th (1999)	Sikkim Democratic Front	Kalawati Subba
8	Mingma Tshering Sherpa	Pathing	24 May 2004	20 May 2009	7th (2004)	Sikkim Democratic Front	D.N. Takarpa
9	Man Bahadur Dahal	Gyalshing–Barnyak	22 May 2009	21 May 2014	8th (2009)	Sikkim Democratic Front	K.T. Gyaltsen
10	Sonam Gyatso Lepcha	Djongu	27 May 2014	1 June 2019	9th (2014)	Sikkim Democratic Front	Kedar Nath Rai
11	Sangay Lepcha	Yoksam–Tashiding	3 June 2019	3 June 2024	10th (2019)	Sikkim Krantikari Morcha	Lall Bahadur Das
11	Sangay Lepcha	Yoksam–Tashiding	3 June 2019	3 June 2024	10th (2019)	Sikkim Krantikari Morcha	Arun Kumar Upreti
12	Raj Kumari Thapa	Rangang–Yangang	12 June 2024	Incumbent	11th (2024)	Sikkim Krantikari Morcha	Mingma Narbu Sherpa

== Pro tem Speaker ==
=== List of Pro tem Speakers ===
  - Sangay Lepcha 2019
  - Sanjeet Kharel 2024
