= Tulsiram Sharma Kashyap =

Indian writer

Tulshi Ram Sharma
- तुलसीराम शर्मा ‘कश्यप’
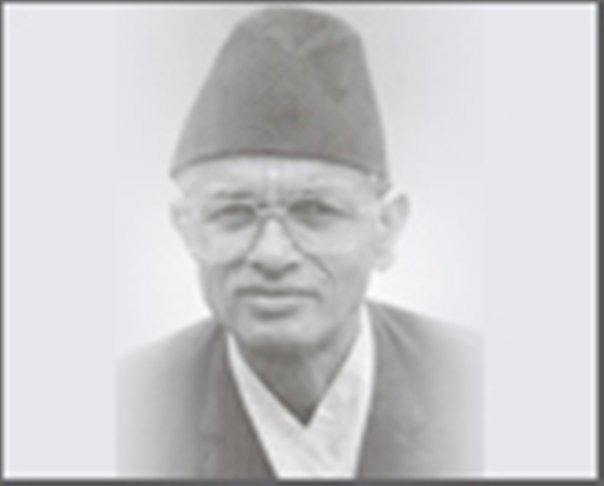

3rd Speaker of the Sikkim Legislative Assembly
- In office 1985–1989
- Preceded by: Sonam Tshering
- Succeeded by: Dorjee Tshering

Member of the Sikkim Legislative Assembly
- In office 1979–1989
- Preceded by: Constituency established
- Succeeded by: Rajendra Prasad Uprety
- Constituency: Regu

Personal details
- Born: 11 February 1939 Chujachen Pam, Kingdom of Sikkim (present-day Sikkim, India)
- Died: 8 February 1998 (aged 58)
- Occupation: Poet, writer, politician
- Awards: Sahitya Akademi Award (1990)

Tulsiram Sharma 'Kashyap' (11 February 1939 – 8 February 1998) was an Indian writer and politician in the Nepali language from Sikkim, India. He is a recipient of Sahitya Academy Award in Nepali for his poetry Aama in 1990. He is the second generation writers of modern era of Nepali literature who has contributed to all genres of literature.

== Early life and education ==
Tulsiram Sharma (Kashyap) was born on February 11, 1939, to late Mr. and Mrs. Chandra Lal Sharma. His early education began in his village school established by his father. His second eldest brother Jai Narayan Sharma greatly influenced the tender mind of Tulsiram Sharma who was gradually introduced to the fascinating world of Gita and KRISHNA CHARITA. Such literary pilgrimage inculcated in him deep love for learning and he began to recite sacred Shlokas from his early childhood.

Tulsiram Sharma passed his School Final Examination from Namchi High School in 1962, and graduated in 1971 as a private candidate.

== Profession career ==
After graduation he was appointed as a graduate teacher and posted to Rhenock and Chujachen Junior High School. From 1975 to 1977, he was deputed to S.S.B. where he discharged his duties as a Circle Organiser. Later, he joined politics and in 1979 general election he was elected and inducted into the Cabinet as Agricultural Minister. Subsequently, he was given Education portfolio. In the next term in 1984 he retained his seat and was elected as the Speaker of the Sikkim Legislative Assembly.

Tulsiram Sharma Kashyap's two well known books are Mahakabya Janmabhumi (1986) published by Ankura Prakashan and Ama ( 1988) published by Aaja Ko Sikkim Prakashan. His contribution to Nepali literature is considered significant. His other notable works are Manthan and Sikkim Hijo Dekhi Aaja Samma.

Late Tulsiram Sharma "Kashyap" was the recipient of Bhanu Puraskar in 1987, and Sahitya Akademi Award in 1990 for his Mahakabya "AMA". He was posthumously awarded the Sikkim State Award in recognition of his contribution in Nepali literature and language on August 15, 1999. Fri, May 18, 2018, GANGTOK,:

== Electoral records ==
Year	Constituency	Political Party	Result	Position	Votes	% Votes	% Margin	Deposit	Source
1979	Regu	SJP	Won						
1985	Regu	SSP	Won						
1989	Regu	Independent	Lost						
1994	Regu	BJP	Lost						

== Awards ==
Tulsiram Sharma 'Kashyap' was the recipient of the Bhanu Puraskar in 1987, and Sahitya Akadami Award in 1990 for his Mahakavya "Aama". He was posthumously awarded the Sikkim State Award in recognition of his contribution to Nepali literature and language on 15 August 1999.

== See also ==
- List of Sahitya Akademi Award winners for Nepali
- Indra Bahadur Rai
- Agam Singh Giri
- Lil Bahadur Chettri
