= Kharananda Upreti =

Indian politician

Kharananda Upreti (K. N. Upreti)

Member of the Sikkim Legislative Assembly
- In office 1979–1999
- Constituency: Rhenock

Minister, Government of Sikkim
- In office 1985–1994
- Constituency: Rhenock

Personal details
- Born: Kharananda Upreti; 1949 or 1950
- Party: SDF (JNP > SCR > SSP > SPCC (INC) > BJP > HSP >)
- Profession: Politician/Social Worker

Karananda Upreti, better known as K. N. Upreti is an Indian politician in Sikkim.

== Political career ==
K. N. Upreti took part in the 1973 democratic movement against Chogyal Dynasty of Sikkim. From 1974 to 1975, he was the general secretary of Sikkim Student Association, Kolkata. From 1976 to 1977, he was the president of National Students' Union of India (NSUI) for Sikkim.

In 1977, K. N. Upreti became the general secretary of Janata Party, Sikkim Unit under Kazi Lhendup Dorjee. In 1978, he seceded from Janata Party, and joined Sikkim Congress (Revolutionary) (SCR) under Bhim Bahadur Gurung (B. B. Gurung) as the general secretary of it. In 1979 Sikkim Legislative Assembly election, Upreti stood as the candidate of SCR from Rhenock constituency, and won in the melee among 10 candidates.

By 1985 Sikkim Legislative Assembly election, K. N. Upreti had joined Sikkim Sangram Parishad (SSP) which was led by Nar Bahadur Bhandari. Upreti won the seat from Rhenock again. In 1989 Sikkim Legislative Assembly election, he won that seat for a third time. He served as the Minister for Law, Education, Sports, UD & HD, Food & Civil Supplies, Culture, Government of Sikkim (Nar Bahadur Bhandari ministry).

In 1994 Sikkim Legislative Assembly election, K. N. Upreti won the seat from Rhenock fourth times, but SSP was beaten by Sikkim Democratic Front (SDF) which was led by Pawan Kumar Chamling. In 1998, Upreti followed Nar Bahadur Bhandari, joined Sikkim Pradesh Congress Committee (SPCC. Sikkim branch of Indian National Congress (INC)) as the vice president of it. In 1999 Sikkim Legislative Assembly election, Upreti did not contest any constituency, meanwhile Bhandari stood as INC candidate from Rhenock constituency and won the seat.

In 2004 Sikkim Legislative Assembly election, K. N. Upreti stood as the candidate of INC from Rhenock, but he was defeated by the candidate of SDF, Bhim PD. Dhungel. In 2009 Sikkim Lok Sabha election, Upreti stood as the candidate of INC again, but he became the runner-up candidate again. In 2010, Upreti came to a rupture with the SPCC president, Nar Bahadur Bhandari. Finally, on March 26, 2011, Upreti and six other leaders was expelled from SPCC by Bhandari.

In December 2017, K. N. Upreti joined Bharatiya Janata Party (BJP) with 2 former SDF State Ministers, Ran Bahadur Subba (R.B. Subba) and Birbal Limboo. However, in August same year, Upreti transferred to Hamro Sikkim Party (HSP) which was led by Bhaichung Bhutia. Upreti was appointed to the advisor of HSP.

In February 2019, Upreti seceded from HSP with acting president of HSP, R.B. Subba and some other leaders. They explained one of the major reasons for quitting from HSP, namely nomination of Bina Basnett as the party president. In addition, they insisted that 80% of party workers of HSP favored to nominate Upreti as the party president. Upreti, Subba and other leaders joined SDF.

== Electoral record ==
Sikkim Legislative Assembly election

Year	Constituency	Political Party	Result	Position	Votes	% Votes	% Margin	Deposit	Source
1979	Rhenock	SC (R)	Won	1st/10	504	23.06	+6.68	refunded	
1985	Rhenock	SSP	Won	1st/7	1,809	59.74	+36.33	refunded	
1989	Rhenock	SSP	Won	1st/3	2,295	60.27	+26.89	refunded	
1994	Rhenock	SSP	Won	1st/4	2,336	46.52	+13.76	refunded	
2004	Rhenock	INC	Lost	2nd/3	1,354	21.98	-53.47	refunded	

Lok Sabah election, Sikkim

Year	Constituency	Political Party	Result	Position	Votes	% Votes	% Margin	Deposit	Source
2009	Sikkim	INC	Lost	2nd/7	74,483	29.59	-33.71	refunded	
