= 2004 Sikkim Legislative Assembly election =

2004 election of the Indian state assembly of Sikkim

- 10 May 2004

All 32 seats in the Sikkim Legislative Assembly 17 seats needed for a majority
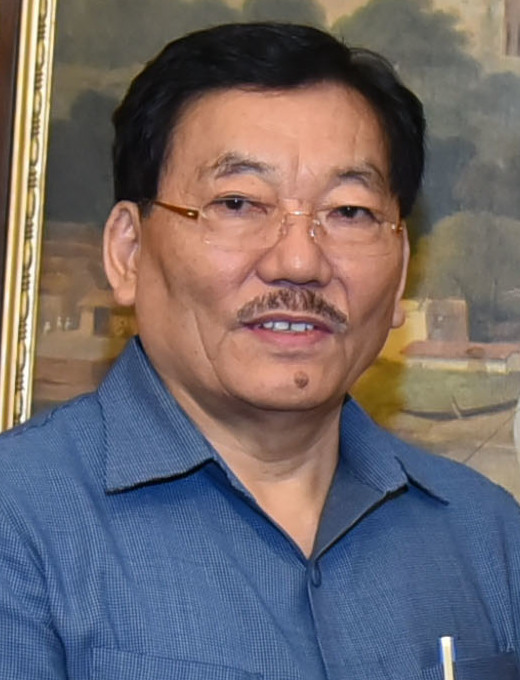

	Majority party	Minority party
Leader	Pawan Kumar Chamling	Nar Bahadur Bhandari
Party	SDF	INC
Leader's seat	Damthang	Central Pendam–East Pendam, Gangtok (both lost)
Seats before	24	0
Seats won	31	1
Seat change	▲7	▲1
Popular vote	139,662	51,329
Percentage	71.09%	26.13%
- Constituencies of Sikkim
Chief Minister before election
Pawan Kumar Chamling
SDF
Elected Chief Minister
Pawan Kumar Chamling
SDF

The 2004 Sikkim Legislative Assembly election took place on 10 May 2004 for 32 members of the Sikkim Legislative Assembly. The votes were counted and result declared on 13 May 2004. Sikkim Democratic Front, a regional political party, won 31 of the 32 assembly seats in this election, with the only other seat going to the Indian National Congress.

== Schedule ==
Event	Date
Date for Nominations	16 April 2004
Last Date for filing Nominations	23 April 2004
Date for scrutiny of nominations	24 April 2004
Last date for withdrawal of candidatures	26 April 2004
Date of poll	10 May 2004
Date of counting	13 May 2004

== Parties Contested ==
No.	Party	Flag	Symbol	Leader	Seats contested
1.	Sikkim Democratic Front			Pawan Kumar Chamling	32
2.	Indian National Congress			Nar Bahadur Bhandari	28
3.	Sikkim Himali Rajya Parishad				9
4.	Bharatiya Janata Party			A. B. Vajpayee	4
5.	Communist Party of India (Marxist)			Harkishan Singh Surjeet	1
6.	Sikkim Sangram Parishad				1
7.	Independents			collective leadership	16

== Results ==
Party	Votes	%	Seats	+/–
Sikkim Democratic Front	139,662	71.09	31	▲12
Indian National Congress	51,329	26.13	1	▼1
Sikkim Himali Rajya Parishad	1,123	0.57	0	New
Bharatiya Janata Party	667	0.34	0	New
Communist Party of India (Marxist)	144	0.07	0	0
Sikkim Sangram Parishad	90	0.05	0	▼7
Independents	3,450	1.76	0	▼1
Total	196,465	100.00	32	0
Valid votes	196,465	99.60		
Invalid/blank votes	781	0.40		
Total votes	197,246	100.00		
Registered voters/turnout	281,937	69.96		
Source: CEO Sikkim

=== Results by constituency ===
Winner, runner-up, voter turnout, and victory margin in every constituency
Assembly Constituency		Turnout	Winner				Runner Up				Margin
#k	Names	%	Candidate	Party	Votes	%	Candidate	Party	Votes	%	Margin
1	Yoksam	80.66%	Kalawati Subba	SDF	3,947	60.9%	Mangal Bir Subba	INC	2,427	37.45%	1,520
2	Tashiding (ST-BL)	84.4%	Dawa Narbu Takarpa	SDF	3,509	65.32%	Sonam Dadul Kazi	INC	1,778	33.1%	1,731
3	Geyzing	78.96%	Sher Bahadur Subedi	SDF	4,227	62.44%	Dal Bahadur Gurung	INC	2,410	35.6%	1,817
4	Dentam	84.97%	Deepak Kumar Gurung	SDF	4,158	65.42%	Sher Hang Subba	INC	2,093	32.93%	2,065
5	Barmiok	81.33%	Narendra Kumar Subba	SDF	4,029	71.92%	Puspak Ram Subba	INC	1,479	26.4%	2,550
6	Rinchenpong (ST-BL)	81.78%	Dawcho Lepcha	SDF	5,303	81.58%	Pema Kinzang Bhutia	INC	1,061	16.32%	4,242
7	Chakung	84.15%	Prem Singh Tamang	SDF	6,702	94.42%	Satish Mohan Pradhan	INC	201	2.83%	6,501
8	Soreong	81.16%	Ram Bahadur Subba	SDF	5,553	72.65%	Ashok Kumar Subba	INC	1,871	24.48%	3,682
9	Daramdin	79.17%	Ran Bahadur Subba	SDF	6,380	87.13%	Amar Subba	INC	819	11.19%	5,561
10	Jorthang–Nayabazar	77.34%	Kedar Nath Rai	SDF	7,863	81.71%	Purna Kri Rai	INC	1,536	15.96%	6,327
11	Ralong (ST-BL)	83.55%	Dorjee Dazom Bhutia	SDF	4,131	77.32%	Chozang Bhutia	INC	1,212	22.68%	2,919
12	Wak	-	Chandra Bahadur Karki	SDF	Elected Unopposed						
13	Damthang	-	Pawan Kumar Chamling	SDF	Elected Unopposed						
14	Melli	-	Girish Chandra Rai	SDF	Elected Unopposed						
15	Rateypani–West Pendam (SC)	76.58%	Aita Singh Baraily (Kami)	SDF	6,553	83.46%	Janga Bir Darnal	INC	1,170	14.9%	5,383
16	Temi–Tarku	79.28%	Garjaman Gurung	SDF	6,403	75.62%	Laxmi Prasad Tiwari	INC	1,947	23.%	4,456
17	Central Pendam–East Pendam	79.45%	Somnath Poudyal	SDF	5,620	59.11%	Nar Bahadur Bhandari	INC	2,165	22.77%	3,455
18	Rhenock	80.96%	Bhim Prasad Dhungel	SDF	4,647	75.45%	Kharananda Upreti	INC	1,354	21.98%	3,293
19	Regu	80.5%	Karna Bahadur Chamling	SDF	5,662	84.28%	Arun Kumar Rai	INC	1,056	15.72%	4,606
20	Pathing (ST-BL)	82.48%	Mingma Tshering Sherpa	SDF	4,930	67.41%	Tseten Tashi Bhutia	INC	2,275	31.11%	2,655
21	Loosing Pachekhani	81.35%	Manita Thapa	SDF	4,394	71.73%	Bharat Basnett	INC	1,651	26.95%	2,743
22	Khamdong (SC)	78.54%	Birkha Man Ramudamu	SDF	6,160	74.59%	Santosh Kumar Bardewa	INC	1,929	23.36%	4,231
23	Djongu (ST-BL)	86.7%	Sonam Gyatso Lepcha	SDF	3,344	65.34%	Sonam Chyoda Lepcha	INC	1,774	34.66%	1,570
24	Lachen Mangshila (ST-BL)	84.18%	Hishey Lachungpa	SDF	4,906	75.56%	Anil Lachenpa	INC	1,587	24.44%	3,319
25	Kabi Tingda (ST-BL)	-	Thenlay Tshering Bhutia	SDF	Elected Unopposed						
26	Rakdong Tentek (ST-BL)	81.%	Norzong Lepcha	SDF	3,809	61.85%	Phuchung Bhutia	INC	2,116	34.36%	1,693
27	Martam (ST-BL)	81.73%	Dorjee Tshering Lepcha	SDF	5,668	74.44%	Sonam Tshering Bhutia	INC	1,946	25.56%	3,722
28	Rumtek (ST-BL)	72.58%	Menlom Lepcha	SDF	5,639	56.61%	Delay Namgyal Barfungpa	INC	4,323	43.39%	1,316
29	Assam–Lingjey (ST-BL)	79.15%	Kunga Zangpo Bhutia	SDF	4,641	64.77%	Kunga Nima Lepcha	INC	2,415	33.71%	2,226
30	Ranka (ST-BL)	74.88%	Nimthit Lepcha	SDF	5,083	60.3%	Pintso Chopel Lepcha	INC	3,230	38.32%	1,853
31	Gangtok	62.5%	Narendra Kumar Pradhan	SDF	5,952	66.69%	Nar Bahadur Bhandari	INC	2,829	31.7%	3,123
32	Sangha (SG)	66.99%	Tshering Lama	INC	675	32.33%	Palden Lama	Independent	587	28.11%	88
