= Regu Assembly constituency =

Constituency of the Sikkim legislative assembly in India

Regu
- Former constituency for the Sikkim Legislative Assembly

Constituency details
- Country: India
- Region: Northeast India
- State: Sikkim
- Established: 1979
- Abolished: 2008
- Total electors: 8,345

Regu Assembly constituency was an assembly constituency in the Indian state of Sikkim.

== Members of the Legislative Assembly ==
Election	Member	Party
1979	Tulshi Sharma	Sikkim Janata Parishad
1985	Tulshi Sharma	Sikkim Sangram Parishad
1989	Rajendra Prasad Uprety	Sikkim Sangram Parishad
1994	Karna Bahadur Chamling	Sikkim Democratic Front
1999	Karna Bahadur Chamling	Sikkim Democratic Front
2004	Karna Bahadur Chamling	Sikkim Democratic Front

== Election results ==
=== Assembly election 2004 ===
2004 Sikkim Legislative Assembly election: Regu
Party	Candidate	Votes	%	±%
SDF	Karna Bahadur Chamling	5,662	84.28%	▲33.37
INC	Arun Kumar Rai	1,056	15.72%	▲15.15
Margin of victory		4,606	68.56%	▲66.18
Turnout		6,718	80.50%	▼0.99
Registered electors		8,345		▲1.45
SDF hold		Swing	▲33.37	

=== Assembly election 1999 ===
1999 Sikkim Legislative Assembly election: Regu
Party	Candidate	Votes	%	±%
SDF	Karna Bahadur Chamling	3,413	50.91%	▲1.75
SSP	Krishan Bahadur Rai	3,253	48.52%	▲2.82
INC	Damber Singh Gurung	38	0.57%	▼1.07
Margin of victory		160	2.39%	▼1.07
Turnout		6,704	82.88%	▼1.21
Registered electors		8,226		▲27.69
SDF hold		Swing	▲1.75	

=== Assembly election 1994 ===
1994 Sikkim Legislative Assembly election: Regu
Party	Candidate	Votes	%	±%
SDF	Karna Bahadur Chamling	2,619	49.16%	New
SSP	Krishna Bahadur Rai	2,435	45.70%	▼10.14
BJP	Tulshi Ram Sharma	137	2.57%	New
INC	Purna Kumar Gurung	87	1.63%	▼33.47
Margin of victory		184	3.45%	▼17.29
Turnout		5,328	84.43%	▲2.47
Registered electors		6,442		
SDF gain from SSP		Swing	▼6.69	

=== Assembly election 1989 ===
1989 Sikkim Legislative Assembly election: Regu
Party	Candidate	Votes	%	±%
SSP	Rajendra Prasad Uprety	2,479	55.85%	▲10.09
INC	Karna Bahadur	1,558	35.10%	▲6.52
RIS	Surmadan Chetri	196	4.42%	New
Independent	Tulshiram Sharma	40	0.90%	New
Independent	D. B. Gurung	24	0.54%	New
Margin of victory		921	20.75%	▲3.56
Turnout		4,439	77.68%	▲16.67
Registered electors		5,532		
SSP hold		Swing	▲10.09	

=== Assembly election 1985 ===
1985 Sikkim Legislative Assembly election: Regu
Party	Candidate	Votes	%	±%
SSP	Tulshi Sharma	1,462	45.76%	New
INC	Karna Bahadur	913	28.58%	▲13.00
Independent	Khusnarayan Pradhan	379	11.86%	New
CPI(M)	Mohan Gurung	336	10.52%	New
Independent	Bauikunda Raj Shretha	40	1.25%	New
Independent	Lok Bagadur Gurung	38	1.19%	New
Independent	Tshering Thargey	27	0.85%	New
Margin of victory		549	17.18%	▲14.61
Turnout		3,195	64.72%	▲5.95
Registered electors		5,026		▲20.27
SSP gain from SJP		Swing	▲19.93	

=== Assembly election 1979 ===
1979 Sikkim Legislative Assembly election: Regu
Party	Candidate	Votes	%	±%
SJP	Tulshi Sharma	622	25.83%	New
Independent	Karna Bahadur	560	23.26%	New
INC	Udai Chandra Vasistha	375	15.57%	New
SC (R)	Chatra Rai	338	14.04%	New
JP	Man Bahadur Rai	214	8.89%	New
SPC	Indra Bahadur Rai	120	4.98%	New
Independent	Dilli Ram Dorjee	87	3.61%	New
Independent	Mani Prasad Rai	50	2.08%	New
Independent	Nar Bahadur Pradhan	42	1.74%	New
Margin of victory		62	2.57%	
Turnout		2,408	59.94%	
Registered electors		4,179		
SJP win (new seat)				
