= Puran Kumar Gurung =

Indian politician

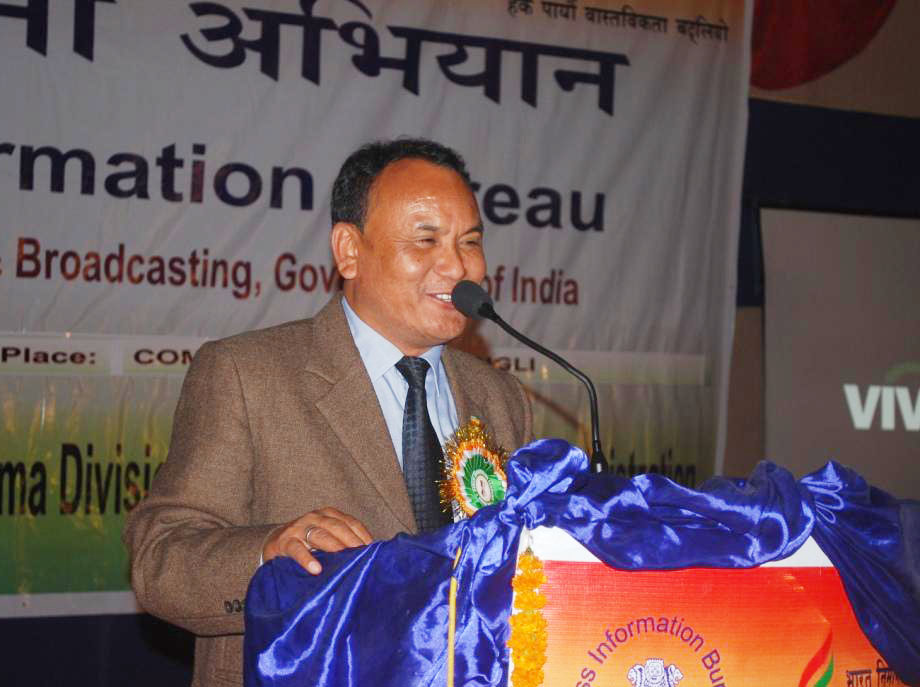
- Public Information Campaign on Bharat Nirman at Rongli on December 2013.

Minister of Agriculture & Horticulture of Sikkim
- Incumbent
- Assumed office 11 June 2024
- Governor: Lakshman Acharya; Om Prakash Mathur
- Chief Minister: Prem Singh Tamang
- Preceded by: Lok Nath Sharma

Minister of Fisheries of Sikkim
- Incumbent
- Assumed office 11 June 2024
- Governor: Lakshman Acharya; Om Prakash Mathur
- Chief Minister: Prem Singh Tamang

Minister of Animal Husbandry and Veterinary Services of Sikkim
- Incumbent
- Assumed office 11 June 2024
- Governor: Lakshman Acharya
- Chief Minister: Prem Singh Tamang
- Preceded by: Lok Nath Sharma

Member of Sikkim Legislative Assembly
- Incumbent
- Assumed office 1 June 2024
- Preceded by: Krishna Bahadur Rai
- Constituency: Chujachen
- In office 2009–2014
- Preceded by: Constituency established
- Succeeded by: Bikram Pradhan
- Constituency: Chujachen

Personal details
- Born: 1967 (age 58–59) Aritar, Sikkim
- Party: Sikkim Krantikari Morcha
- Other political affiliations: Sikkim Democratic Front
- Education: Bachelor of Arts
- Alma mater: Sikkim Government College
- Occupation: Politician

Puran Kumar Gurung (born 1967) is an Indian politician from Sikkim. He is an MLA of Sikkim Krantikari Morcha from Chujachen Assembly Constituency in Pakyong district. He won the 2024 Sikkim Legislative Assembly election.

== Early life and education ==
Gurung is a resident of Aritar Basty post, Aritar, East Sikkim. He was born to Dilli Samsher Gurung. He passed the Senior Secondary School Examination, equivalent to Class 12, at Chujachen Senior Secondary School in 1985. Later, he completed Bachelor of Arts from Sikkim Government College, affiliated with University of North Bengal in 1987. He married Asha Gurung and has two sons, Kenny Gurung and Shawan Gurung.

== Career ==
Gurung started his political career with Sikkim Democratic Front and was first elected as an MLA from Chujachen Assembly Constituency in 2009. He won the 2009 Sikkim Legislative Assembly election defeating Harka Raj Gurung of Indian National Congress by a margin of 5,963 votes. He again won from Chujachen Assembly Constituency in the 2024 Sikkim Legislative Assembly election representing Sikkim Krantikari Morcha. He defeated Mani Kumar Gurung of Sikkim Democratic Front by a margin of 3,334 votes.
