= Sher Bahadur Subedi =

Indian politician (1957/1958 – 2024)

Sher Bahadur Subedi (1957/1958 – 9 February 2024) was an Indian Sikkim Democratic Front politician from Sikkim. He was elected in Sikkim Legislative Assembly election in 2014 from Gyalshing-Barnyak constituency as candidate of Sikkim Democratic Front. He was minister of Rural Management & Development, Panchayati Raj and Cooperation in Pawan Chamling's fifth ministry from 2014 to 2019. Subedi died from cancer on 9 February 2024, at the age of 66.

== Electoral performance ==
Election	Constituency	Party	Result	Votes %	Opposition Candidate	Opposition Party	Opposition vote %	Ref
1999	Geyzing	SDF	Won	53.06%	Puspak Ram Subba	SSP	40.07%	
2004	Geyzing	SDF	Won	62.44%	Dal Bahadur Gurung	INC	35.06%	
2014	Gyalshing–Barnyak	SDF	Won	50.86%	Lok Nath Sharma	SKM	43.68%	
