= Sonam Gyatso =

Sonam Gyatso may refer to:

- The 3rd Dalai Lama
- Sonam Gyatso (mountaineer), oldest person to summit Everest when he summited in 1965
- Sonam Gyatso Lepcha, Indian politician from Sikkim
