= Kabi Tingda Assembly constituency =

Constituency of the Sikkim legislative assembly in India

Kabi Tingda
- Former constituency for the Sikkim Legislative Assembly

Constituency details
- Country: India
- Region: Northeast India
- State: Sikkim
- Established: 1979
- Abolished: 2008
- Total electors: 6,163

Kabi Tingda Assembly constituency was an assembly constituency in the Indian state of Sikkim.

== Members of the Legislative Assembly ==
Election	Member	Party
1979	Sonam Tshering	Sikkim Janata Parishad
1985	Kalzang Gyatso	Indian National Congress
1989	Hangu Tshering Bhutia	Sikkim Sangram Parishad
1994	Thenlay Tshering Bhutia	Sikkim Democratic Front
1999	Thenlay Tshering Bhutia	Sikkim Democratic Front
2004	Thenlay Tshering Bhutia	Sikkim Democratic Front

== Election results ==
=== Assembly election 2004 ===
2004 Sikkim Legislative Assembly election: Kabi Tingda
Party	Candidate	Votes	%	±%
SDF	Thenlay Tshering Bhutia	Unopposed		
Registered electors		6,163		▲10.91
SDF hold		Swing		

=== Assembly election 1999 ===
1999 Sikkim Legislative Assembly election: Kabi Tingda
Party	Candidate	Votes	%	±%
SDF	Thenlay Tshering Bhutia	2,028	43.07%	▲4.02
INC	T. Lachungpa	1,418	30.11%	▼7.55
SSP	Palden Bhutia	1,263	26.82%	▲3.98
Margin of victory		610	12.95%	▲11.57
Turnout		4,709	86.27%	▲10.07
Registered electors		5,557		▲4.26
SDF hold		Swing	▲4.02	

=== Assembly election 1994 ===
1994 Sikkim Legislative Assembly election: Kabi Tingda
Party	Candidate	Votes	%	±%
SDF	Thenlay Tshering Bhutia	1,554	39.05%	New
INC	T. Lachungpa	1,499	37.66%	▼1.41
SSP	Pema Sherap Lepcha	909	22.84%	▼32.82
Margin of victory		55	1.38%	▼15.20
Turnout		3,980	81.43%	▼1.86
Registered electors		5,330		
SDF gain from SSP		Swing		

=== Assembly election 1989 ===
1989 Sikkim Legislative Assembly election: Kabi Tingda
Party	Candidate	Votes	%	±%
SSP	Hangu Tshering Bhutia	1,806	55.65%	▲21.94
INC	Kalzang Gyatso	1,268	39.08%	▼9.62
RIS	Sonam Dorjee	37	1.14%	New
Margin of victory		538	16.58%	▲1.60
Turnout		3,245	73.37%	▲14.43
Registered electors		4,240		
SSP gain from INC		Swing		

=== Assembly election 1985 ===
1985 Sikkim Legislative Assembly election: Kabi Tingda
Party	Candidate	Votes	%	±%
INC	Kalzang Gyatso	1,102	48.70%	New
SSP	Geyching Bhutia	763	33.72%	New
Independent	Azing Lepcha	324	14.32%	New
Independent	Karma Chultim Bhutia	46	2.03%	New
Independent	Karma Pintsu Bhutia	13	0.57%	New
Margin of victory		339	14.98%	▲6.72
Turnout		2,263	66.08%	▲3.29
Registered electors		3,644		▲27.41
INC gain from SJP		Swing	▼1.96	

=== Assembly election 1979 ===
1979 Sikkim Legislative Assembly election: Kabi Tingda
Party	Candidate	Votes	%	±%
SJP	Sonam Tshering	852	50.65%	New
JP	Kalzang Gyatso	713	42.39%	New
Independent	Nima Kazi	51	3.03%	New
SPC	Dawa Thendup Lepcha	45	2.68%	New
Independent	Sonam Dorjee	21	1.25%	New
Margin of victory		139	8.26%	
Turnout		1,682	60.91%	
Registered electors		2,860		
SJP win (new seat)				
