= Jorthang–Nayabazar Assembly constituency =

Constituency of the Sikkim legislative assembly in India

Jorthang–Nayabazar
- Former constituency for the Sikkim Legislative Assembly

Constituency details
- Country: India
- Region: Northeast India
- State: Sikkim
- Established: 1979
- Abolished: 2008
- Total electors: 12,442

Jorthang–Nayabazar Assembly constituency was an assembly constituency in the Indian state of Sikkim.

== Members of the Legislative Assembly ==
Election	Member	Party
1979	Bhim Bahadur Gurung	Sikkim Congress
1985	Bhim Raj Rai	Sikkim Sangram Parishad
1989	Bhim Raj Rai	Sikkim Sangram Parishad
1994	Bhoj Raj Rai	Sikkim Democratic Front
1999	Bhoj Raj Rai	Sikkim Democratic Front
2004	Kedar Nath Rai	Sikkim Democratic Front

== Election results ==
=== Assembly election 2004 ===
2004 Sikkim Legislative Assembly election: Jorthang–Nayabazar
Party	Candidate	Votes	%	±%
SDF	Kedar Nath Rai	7,863	81.71%	▲26.37
INC	Purna Kri Rai	1,536	15.96%	▲15.13
BJP	Padam Prasad Sharma	224	2.33%	New
Margin of victory		6,327	65.75%	▲51.97
Turnout		9,623	77.34%	▼2.95
Registered electors		12,442		▲15.40
SDF hold		Swing	▲26.37	

=== Assembly election 1999 ===
1999 Sikkim Legislative Assembly election: Jorthang–Nayabazar
Party	Candidate	Votes	%	±%
SDF	Bhoj Raj Rai	4,791	55.34%	▼3.66
SSP	Bhim Raj Rai	3,598	41.56%	▲5.84
Independent	Biren Chandra	196	2.26%	New
INC	Durga Lama	72	0.83%	▼3.64
Margin of victory		1,193	13.78%	▼9.49
Turnout		8,657	82.04%	▼1.52
Registered electors		10,782		▲25.10
SDF hold		Swing	▼3.66	

=== Assembly election 1994 ===
1994 Sikkim Legislative Assembly election: Jorthang–Nayabazar
Party	Candidate	Votes	%	±%
SDF	Bhoj Raj Rai	4,160	59.00%	New
SSP	Dil Kumari Bhandari	2,519	35.73%	▼40.38
INC	Budha Maya Subba	315	4.47%	▼15.62
Margin of victory		1,641	23.27%	▼32.74
Turnout		7,051	83.80%	▲9.95
Registered electors		8,619		
SDF gain from SSP		Swing		

=== Assembly election 1989 ===
1989 Sikkim Legislative Assembly election: Jorthang–Nayabazar
Party	Candidate	Votes	%	±%
SSP	Bhim Raj Rai	4,023	76.11%	▲7.22
INC	Rajan Gurung	1,062	20.09%	▲5.18
RIS	Birkha Rai	201	3.80%	New
Margin of victory		2,961	56.02%	▲2.04
Turnout		5,286	74.03%	▲2.10
Registered electors		7,356		
SSP hold		Swing		

=== Assembly election 1985 ===
1985 Sikkim Legislative Assembly election: Jorthang–Nayabazar
Party	Candidate	Votes	%	±%
SSP	Bhim Raj Rai	2,648	68.89%	New
INC	Asharman Rai	573	14.91%	New
Independent	Bircha Rai	408	10.61%	New
Independent	Bishnu Kumar Gazmer	170	4.42%	New
Independent	Babulal Goyal	27	0.70%	New
Margin of victory		2,075	53.98%	▲52.03
Turnout		3,844	71.58%	▼4.59
Registered electors		5,510		▲30.94
SSP gain from SC (R)		Swing	▲44.79	

=== Assembly election 1979 ===
1979 Sikkim Legislative Assembly election: Jorthang–Nayabazar
Party	Candidate	Votes	%	±%
SC (R)	Bhim Bahadur Gurung	754	24.10%	New
SJP	Lila Kumar Rai	693	22.15%	New
SPC	Hastdas Rai	599	19.14%	New
Independent	Neel Kamal Thapa	406	12.98%	New
JP	S. K. Rai	369	11.79%	New
Independent	Humanay Rai	210	6.71%	New
Independent	Hastudas Rai	67	2.14%	New
Independent	Kaluram Agrawal	31	0.99%	New
Margin of victory		61	1.95%	
Turnout		3,129	77.31%	
Registered electors		4,208		
SC (R) win (new seat)				
