= Ralong Assembly constituency =

Constituency of the Sikkim legislative assembly in India

Ralong
- Former constituency for the Sikkim Legislative Assembly

Constituency details
- Country: India
- Region: Northeast India
- State: Sikkim
- Established: 1979
- Abolished: 2008
- Total electors: 6,395

Ralong Assembly constituency was an assembly constituency in the Indian state of Sikkim.

== Members of the Legislative Assembly ==
Election	Member	Party
1979	Chamla Tshering	Sikkim Congress
1985	Sonam Gyatso	Sikkim Sangram Parishad
1989	Sonam Gyatso Kaleon	Sikkim Sangram Parishad
1994	Dorjee Dazom Bhutia	Sikkim Democratic Front
1999	Dorjee Dazom Bhutia	Sikkim Democratic Front
2004	Dorjee Dazom Bhutia	Sikkim Democratic Front

== Election results ==
=== Assembly election 2004 ===
2004 Sikkim Legislative Assembly election: Ralong
Party	Candidate	Votes	%	±%
SDF	Dorjee Dazom Bhutia	4,131	77.32%	▲23.01
INC	Chozang Bhutia	1,212	22.68%	▲18.68
Margin of victory		2,919	54.63%	▲26.57
Turnout		5,343	83.55%	▲0.21
Registered electors		6,395		▲8.37
SDF hold		Swing	▲23.01	

=== Assembly election 1999 ===
1999 Sikkim Legislative Assembly election: Ralong
Party	Candidate	Votes	%	±%
SDF	Dorjee Dazom Bhutia	2,671	54.31%	▲8.58
SSP	Ugen Tashi Bhutia	1,291	26.25%	▲0.52
Independent	Chewang Sherpa	759	15.43%	New
INC	Sonam Tshering Bhutia	197	4.01%	▼19.84
Margin of victory		1,380	28.06%	▲8.06
Turnout		4,918	85.66%	▼0.89
Registered electors		5,901		▲12.68
SDF hold		Swing	▲8.58	

=== Assembly election 1994 ===
1994 Sikkim Legislative Assembly election: Ralong
Party	Candidate	Votes	%	±%
SDF	Dorjee Dazom Bhutia	2,017	45.73%	New
SSP	Ugen Tashi Bhutia	1,135	25.73%	▼64.01
INC	Sonam Gyatso Kaleon	1,052	23.85%	▲14.85
Independent	Dawa Tempa Sherpa	183	4.15%	New
Independent	Taktuk Bhutia	24	0.54%	New
Margin of victory		882	20.00%	▼60.75
Turnout		4,411	85.93%	▲17.50
Registered electors		5,237		
SDF gain from SSP		Swing	▼44.01	

=== Assembly election 1989 ===
1989 Sikkim Legislative Assembly election: Ralong
Party	Candidate	Votes	%	±%
SSP	Sonam Gyatso Kaleon	2,903	89.74%	▲22.32
INC	Dorjee Dazom Bhutia	291	9.00%	▼13.89
RIS	Passang Sherpa	41	1.27%	New
Margin of victory		2,612	80.74%	▲36.20
Turnout		3,235	68.58%	▲0.89
Registered electors		4,848		
SSP hold		Swing		

=== Assembly election 1985 ===
1985 Sikkim Legislative Assembly election: Ralong
Party	Candidate	Votes	%	±%
SSP	Sonam Gyatso	1,697	67.42%	New
INC	Kazi Lhendup Dorjee Khangsharpa	576	22.88%	▲21.38
Independent	Dawa Tshering Bhutia	97	3.85%	New
Independent	Tashi Lhendup Bhatia	67	2.66%	New
JP	Ninda Bhutia	42	1.67%	▼16.61
SPC	Pema Wangchuk Bhutia	28	1.11%	▼7.43
Margin of victory		1,121	44.54%	▲40.51
Turnout		2,517	67.85%	▲0.11
Registered electors		3,823		▲51.11
SSP gain from SC (R)		Swing	▲41.08	

=== Assembly election 1979 ===
1979 Sikkim Legislative Assembly election: Ralong
Party	Candidate	Votes	%	±%
SC (R)	Chamla Tshering	438	26.34%	New
Independent	Sonam Pintso Takapa	371	22.31%	New
SJP	Tashi Wangdi Bhutia	336	20.20%	New
JP	Karma Bhutia	304	18.28%	New
SPC	Norbu Tshering Bhutia	142	8.54%	New
Independent	Passang Tshering Bhutia	39	2.35%	New
INC	Ugen Tashi Bhutia	25	1.50%	New
Margin of victory		67	4.03%	
Turnout		1,663	69.29%	
Registered electors		2,530		
SC (R) win (new seat)				
