= Melli Assembly constituency =

Constituency of the Sikkim legislative assembly in India

Coordinates: 27.090°N 88.456°E

Melli
- Constituency No. 12 for the Sikkim Legislative Assembly

Constituency details
- Country: India
- Region: Northeast India
- State: Sikkim
- District: Namchi
- Lok Sabha constituency: Sikkim
- Established: 1979
- Total electors: 15,479
- Reservation: None

Member of Legislative Assembly
- 11th Sikkim Legislative Assembly
- Incumbent Nar Bahadur Pradhan
- Party: SKM
- Alliance: NDA
- Elected year: 2024

Melli Assembly constituency is one of the 32 assembly constituencies of Sikkim a north east state of India. Melli is part of Sikkim Lok Sabha constituency.

== Members of the Legislative Assembly ==
Election	Member	Party
1979	Mohan Prasad Sharma	Sikkim Janata Parishad
1985	Dilliram Basnet	Sikkim Sangram Parishad
1989	Dilliram Basnet	Sikkim Sangram Parishad
1994	Girish Chandra Rai	Sikkim Democratic Front
1999	Girish Chandra Rai	Sikkim Democratic Front
2004	Girish Chandra Rai	Sikkim Democratic Front
2009	Tulshi Devi Rai	Sikkim Democratic Front
2014	Tulshi Devi Rai	Sikkim Democratic Front
2019	Farwanti Tamang	Sikkim Democratic Front
2024	Nar Bahadur Pradhan	Sikkim Krantikari Morcha

== Election results ==
=== Assembly Election 2024 ===
2024 Sikkim Legislative Assembly election: Melli
Party	Candidate	Votes	%	±%
SKM	Nar Bahadur Pradhan	7,904	57.96%	▲14.56
CAP–Sikkim	Ganesh Kumar Rai	3,621	26.55%	New
SDF	Nirmal Kumar Pradhan	1,321	9.69%	▼40.56
BJP	Yogen Rai	582	4.27%	▲1.25
Independent	Rupen Karki	109	0.80%	New
NOTA	None of the Above	99	0.73%	▼0.59
Margin of victory		4,283	31.41%	▲24.57
Turnout		13,636	85.07%	▲3.38
Registered electors		16,029		▲3.55
SKM gain from SDF		Swing	▲7.72	

=== Assembly election 2019 ===
2019 Sikkim Legislative Assembly election: Melli
Party	Candidate	Votes	%	±%
SDF	Farwanti Tamang	6,354	50.25%	▼17.07
SKM	Tilak Basnet	5,489	43.41%	▲13.46
BJP	Bhola Chawhan	382	3.02%	New
NOTA	None of the Above	166	1.31%	▼0.25
INC	Hari Basnett	121	0.96%	▼0.20
SRP	Bal Bir Tamang	70	0.55%	New
Margin of victory		865	6.84%	▼30.53
Turnout		12,645	81.69%	▼2.88
Registered electors		15,479		▲15.13
SDF hold		Swing	▼17.07	

=== Assembly election 2014 ===
2014 Sikkim Legislative Assembly election: Melli
Party	Candidate	Votes	%	±%
SDF	Tulshi Devi Rai	7,655	67.32%	▼0.16
SKM	Prem Bahadur Karki	3,406	29.95%	New
NOTA	None of the Above	178	1.57%	New
INC	Man Bahadur Rai	132	1.16%	▼25.09
Margin of victory		4,249	37.37%	▼3.85
Turnout		11,371	84.57%	▲0.74
Registered electors		13,445		▲20.58
SDF hold		Swing	▼0.16	

=== Assembly election 2009 ===
2009 Sikkim Legislative Assembly election: Melli
Party	Candidate	Votes	%	±%
SDF	Tulshi Devi Rai	6,307	67.48%	New
INC	Dil Kri. Chhetri	2,454	26.25%	New
BJP	Bhola Chawhan	148	1.58%	New
CPI(M)	Bhagirath Bhandari	130	1.39%	New
Independent	Shiva Das Rai	119	1.27%	New
Sikkim Gorkha Party	Phulchand Rai	84	0.90%	New
NCP	Jashram Rai	68	0.73%	New
Margin of victory		3,853	41.22%	
Turnout		9,347	83.83%	▲83.83
Registered electors		11,150		
SDF hold		Swing		

=== Assembly election 2004 ===
2004 Sikkim Legislative Assembly election: Melli
Party	Candidate	Votes	%	±%
SDF	Girish Chandra Rai	Unopposed		
Registered electors		9,609		
SDF hold		Swing		

=== Assembly election 1999 ===
1999 Sikkim Legislative Assembly election: Melli
Party	Candidate	Votes	%	±%
SDF	Girish Chandra Rai	4,059	58.81%	▲6.18
SSP	G. S. Lama	2,800	40.57%	▲4.11
INC	Hari Basnet	43	0.62%	▼8.84
Margin of victory		1,259	18.24%	▲2.07
Turnout		6,902	84.08%	▼0.39
Registered electors		8,361		▲17.43
SDF hold		Swing		

=== Assembly election 1994 ===
1994 Sikkim Legislative Assembly election: Melli
Party	Candidate	Votes	%	±%
SDF	Girish Chandra Rai	3,108	52.63%	New
SSP	Manita Pradhan	2,153	36.46%	▼39.23
INC	Deo Narayan Pradhan	559	9.47%	New
Independent	Chandra Basnet	47	0.80%	New
Margin of victory		955	16.17%	▼45.56
Turnout		5,905	85.13%	▲12.77
Registered electors		7,120		▲11.22
SDF gain from SSP		Swing	▼23.06	

=== Assembly election 1989 ===
1989 Sikkim Legislative Assembly election: Melli
Party	Candidate	Votes	%	±%
SSP	Dilliram Basnet	3,400	75.69%	▲4.88
Independent	Girish Chandra Rai	627	13.96%	New
RIS	Man Bahadur Tamang	287	6.39%	New
Independent	Bishnu Kumar Rai	178	3.96%	New
Margin of victory		2,773	61.73%	▲14.35
Turnout		4,492	72.57%	▲1.97
Registered electors		6,402		▲25.68
SSP hold		Swing	▲4.88	

=== Assembly election 1985 ===
1985 Sikkim Legislative Assembly election: Melli
Party	Candidate	Votes	%	±%
SSP	Dilliram Basnet	2,460	70.81%	New
INC	Grish Chandra Rai	814	23.43%	▲19.05
Independent	Chandra Khaling	189	5.44%	New
Margin of victory		1,646	47.38%	▲41.71
Turnout		3,474	69.67%	▼5.11
Registered electors		5,094		▲50.09
SSP gain from SJP		Swing		

=== Assembly election 1979 ===
1979 Sikkim Legislative Assembly election: Melli
Party	Candidate	Votes	%	±%
SJP	Mohan Prasad Sharma	669	26.89%	New
Independent	Sailesh Chandra Pradhan	528	21.22%	New
SPC	Lal Das Rai	295	11.86%	New
JP	D. B. Basnet	263	10.57%	New
Independent	Deo Narayan Pradhan	221	8.88%	New
Independent	Bhim Bahadur Gurung	201	8.08%	New
SC (R)	Nanda Bahadur Rai	163	6.55%	New
INC	Chabilall Rai	109	4.38%	New
Independent	Krishna Kumar Dulal	21	0.84%	New
Independent	Kali Prasad Rai	18	0.72%	New
Margin of victory		141	5.67%	
Turnout		2,488	77.20%	
Registered electors		3,394		
SJP win (new seat)				

== See also ==
- Melli
- Namchi district
- List of constituencies of Sikkim Legislative Assembly
