= 1999 Sikkim Legislative Assembly election =

Legislative Assembly election in Sikkim State, India

- 3 October 1999

32 seats in the Sikkim Legislative Assembly 17 seats needed for a majority
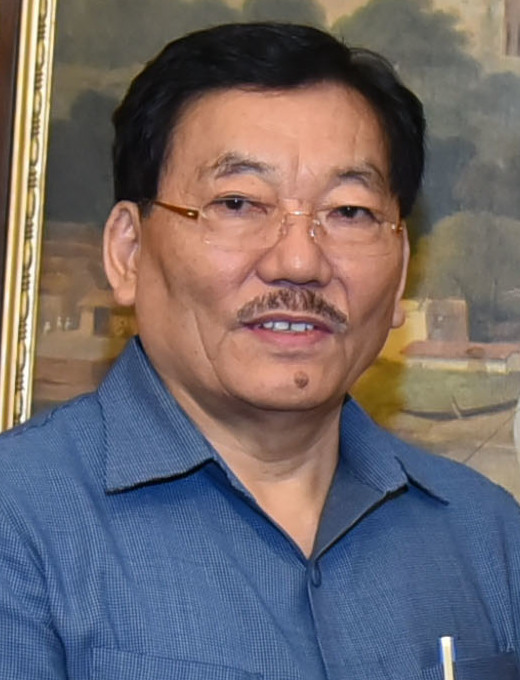
	Majority party	Minority party
		SSP
Leader	Pawan Kumar Chamling	Nar Bahadur Bhandari
Party	SDF	SSP
Leader's seat	Damthang	Rhenock
Last election	19	10
Seats won	24	7
Seat change	▲5	▼3
Popular vote	107,214	85,827
Percentage	52.32%	41.88%
- Constituencies of Sikkim
CM before election
Pawan Kumar Chamling
SDF
Elected CM
Pawan Kumar Chamling
SDF

Legislative Assembly elections were held in Sikkim, in October 1999, to elect the 32 members of the sixth Legislative Assembly. Sikkim Democratic Front won 24 seats, a little over two-thirds in the house.

== Election schedule ==
The polling schedule for the 1999 General Elections and State Assembly elections was announced by the Chief Election Commissioner on 11 July 1999.

Poll event	Date
Notification date	7 September 1999
Last date for filing nomination	14 September 1999
Scrutiny of nomination	15 September 1999
Last Date for withdrawal of nomination	17 September 1999
Date of poll	3 October 1999
Date of counting of votes/Result	6 October 1999

== Parties and alliances ==
=== SDF+ ===
No.	Party	Flag	Symbol	Leader	Seats contested
1.	Sikkim Democratic Front			Pawan Kumar Chamling	31
2.	Independent			Palden Lama	1

=== Sikkim Sangram Parishad ===
No.	Party	Flag	Symbol	Leader	Seats contested
1.	Sikkim Sangram Parishad			Nar Bahadur Bhandari	32

=== Indian National Congress ===
No.	Party	Flag	Symbol	Leader	Seats contested
1.	Indian National Congress			Sonia Gandhi	31

=== CPI(M) ===
No.	Party	Flag	Symbol	Leader	Seats contested
1.	Communist Party of India (Marxist)			Harkishan Singh Surjeet	2

== Results ==
Party	Votes	%	Seats	+/–
Sikkim Democratic Front	107,214	52.32	24	▲5
Sikkim Sangram Parishad	85,827	41.88	7	▼3
Indian National Congress	7,512	3.67	0	▼2
Communist Party of India (Marxist)	398	0.19	0	0
Independents	3,976	1.94	1	0
Total	204,927	100.00	32	0
Valid votes	204,927	98.06		
Invalid/blank votes	4,056	1.94		
Total votes	208,983	100.00		
Registered voters/turnout	255,377	81.83		
Source: CEO Sikkim

=== Results by constituency ===
Winner, runner-up, voter turnout, and victory margin in every constituency
Assembly Constituency		Turnout	Winner				Runner Up				Margin
#k	Names	%	Candidate	Party	Votes	%	Candidate	Party	Votes	%	Margin
1	Yoksam	81.81%	Kalawati Subba	SDF	3,240	51.65%	Mangalbir Subba	SSP	1,749	27.88%	1,491
2	Tashiding	84.74%	Thutop Bhutia	SDF	2,740	53.77%	Sonam Dadul Kazi	SSP	2,148	42.15%	592
3	Geyzing	82.54%	Sher Bahadur Subedi	SDF	3,316	53.06%	Puspak Ram Subba	SSP	2,504	40.07%	812
4	Dentam	86.62%	Narendra Kumar Subba	SDF	3,112	51.81%	Padam Lall Gurung	SSP	2,636	43.89%	476
5	Barmiok	81.28%	Tulshi Prasad Pradhan	SDF	2,353	44.93%	Birendra Subba	SSP	2,020	38.57%	333
6	Rinchenpong	82.15%	Ongden Tshering Lepcha	SDF	3,640	60.49%	Pema Kinzang Bhutia	SSP	2,001	33.25%	1,639
7	Chakung	83.73%	Prem Singh Tamang	SDF	3,572	56.55%	Tika Gurung	SSP	2,420	38.32%	1,152
8	Soreong	83.15%	Ram Bahadur Subba	SDF	3,456	48.83%	Nar Bahadur Bhandari	SSP	3,390	47.9%	66
9	Daramdin	83.19%	Ran Bahadur Subba	SDF	4,194	60.98%	Akar Dhoj Subba	SSP	2,532	36.81%	1,662
10	Jorthang–Nayabazar	82.04%	Bhoj Raj Rai	SDF	4,791	54.16%	Bhim Raj Rai	SSP	3,598	40.67%	1,193
11	Ralong	85.66%	Dorjee Dazom Bhutia	SDF	2,671	52.84%	Ugen Tashi Bhutia	SSP	1,291	25.54%	1,380
12	Wak	82.37%	Kedar Nath Rai	SDF	3,284	64.91%	Manoj Rai	SSP	1,683	33.27%	1,601
13	Damthang	82.34%	Pawan Kumar Chamling	SDF	4,952	71.39%	Kamal Kumar Rai	SSP	1,866	26.9%	3,086
14	Melli	84.08%	Girish Chandra Rai	SDF	4,059	57.74%	G. S. Lama	SSP	2,800	39.83%	1,259
15	Rateypani–West Pendam	83.94%	Chandra Kumar Mohora	SDF	4,073	55.09%	Madan Kumar Cintury	SSP	3,115	42.13%	958
16	Temi–Tarku	83.02%	Garjaman Gurung	SDF	4,396	57.76%	Dil Kumari Bhandari	SSP	3,071	40.35%	1,325
17	Central Pendam–East Pendam	81.%	Sang Dorjee Tamang	SSP	4,575	49.89%	Dilli Prasad Kharel	SDF	4,329	47.2%	246
18	Rhenock	81.04%	Nar Bahadur Bhandari	SSP	3,364	54.77%	Bedu Singh Panth	SDF	2,576	41.94%	788
19	Regu	82.88%	Karna Bahadur Chamling	SDF	3,413	50.06%	Krishan Bahadur Rai	SSP	3,253	47.71%	160
20	Pathing	84.07%	Sonam Dorjee	SSP	3,755	51.79%	Ram Lepcha	SDF	2,903	40.04%	852
21	Loosing Pachekhani	84.%	Jai Kumar Bhandari	SSP	2,826	47.09%	Vinod Pradhan	SDF	2,821	47.01%	5
22	Khamdong	83.62%	Gopal Lamichaney	SDF	4,507	58.65%	Lall Bahadur Das	SSP	2,954	38.44%	1,553
23	Djongu	86.4%	Sonam Gyatso Lepcha	SSP	2,399	50.77%	Sonam Chyoda Lepcha	SDF	2,228	47.15%	171
24	Lachen Mangshila	87.79%	Hishey Lachungpa	SDF	3,772	58.24%	Nedup Tshering Lachenpa	SSP	2,540	39.22%	1,232
25	Kabi Tingda	86.27%	Thenlay Tshering Bhutia	SDF	2,028	42.3%	T. Lachungpa	INC	1,418	29.58%	610
26	Rakdong Tentek	79.17%	Mingma Tshering Sherpa	SSP	2,823	49.82%	Danorbu Sherpa	SDF	1,140	20.12%	1,683
27	Martam	81.44%	Dorjee Tshering Lepcha	SDF	4,262	60.93%	Nuk Tshering Bhutia	SSP	2,485	35.53%	1,777
28	Rumtek	78.03%	Karma Tempo Namgyal Gyaltsen	SDF	4,326	49.34%	O. T. Bhutia	SSP	4,132	47.13%	194
29	Assam–Lingjey	83.39%	Tseten Tashi Bhutia	SDF	2,951	44.33%	Kunga Zangpo Bhutia	SSP	2,850	42.81%	101
30	Ranka	81.46%	Tseten Dorjee Lepcha	SDF	4,274	55.43%	Pintso Chopel Lepcha	SSP	3,182	41.27%	1,092
31	Gangtok	67.82%	Narendra Kumar Pradhan	SSP	4,308	47.75%	K. B. Gurung	SDF	3,835	42.51%	473
32	Sangha	61.43%	Palden Lama	IND	1,309	64.77%	Namkha Gyaltsen Lama	INC	370	18.31%	939
