= Kedar Nath Rai =

Indian politician

Kedar Nath Rai is a leader of Sikkim Democratic Front. He is the 9th Speaker of the Sikkim Legislative Assembly. He was elected to the assembly from Poklok-Kamrang. Rai had earlier served as minister in the Government of Sikkim. He has also been elected from Jorethang during term of 2004–09.

== Electoral performance ==
Election	Constituency	Party	Result	Votes %	Opposition Candidate	Opposition Party	Opposition vote %	Ref
2014	Poklok–Kamrang	SDF	Won	68.85%	Bhoj Raj Rai	SKM	28.63%	
2004	Jorthang–Nayabazar	SDF	Won	81.71%	Purna Kumari Rai	INC	15.96%	
1999	Wak	SDF	Won	64.91%	Manoj Rai	SSP	33.27%	
1994	Wak	SDF	Won	51.71%	Bedu Singh Panth	SSP	33.01%	
