= Tashi Thendup Bhutia =

Indian politician

MLA Tashi Thendup Bhutia

Member of Sikkim Legislative Assembly for Barfung
- In office May 2019 – May 2024
- Preceded by: Dorjee Dazom Bhutia
- Succeeded by: Rikshal Dorjee Bhutia

Personal details
- Party: Bharatiya Janata Party (from 2019); Sikkim Democratic Front

Tashi Thendup Bhutia is a Bharatiya Janata Party politician from Sikkim. He has been elected in Sikkim Legislative Assembly election in 2019 from Barfung constituency as candidate of Sikkim Democratic Front but later he joined Bharatiya Janata Party.
