= Chujachen =

- Location in Sikkim, India Chujachen (India)
- Coordinates: 27.212607°N 88.683341°E
- Country: India
- State: Sikkim
- District: Pakyong District
- Subdivision: Rongli

Languages
  - Official: Nepali (Gorkha), Bhutia, Lepcha, Limbu, Newari, Rai, Gurung, Mangar, Sherpa, Tamang and Sunwar
- Time zone: UTC+5:30 (IST)
- PIN: 737131
- Telephone code: 03592
- Vehicle registration: SK-01 and SK-07
- Nearest city: Rongli
- Vidhan Sabha: Chujachen Constituency

Chujachen is a large village located above Rongli Bazar, Pakyong District, numbering 816 households per a 2011 census. It resides at latitude 27.21 and longitude 88.68.

== History ==
Meaning of the village name Chujachen means above pani dhara. The village origin By Norbu or Nopu Bhutia In 1951 a primary School was established and later upgraded to a Senior secondary in 1984.

== Chujachen data ==
According to the 2011 census, Chujachen's demographics are as follows:

Particulars	Total	Male	Female
1. Total No. of Houses	1094		
2. Population	4781	2492	2289
3. Child (0–6)	545	293	252
4. Schedule Caste	168	83	85
5. Schedule Tribe	648	318	330
6. Literacy	84.30 %	88.68 %	79.58 %
7. Total Workers	1537	1128	409
8. Main Worker	246	0	0
9. Marginal Worker	333	178	155

== Notable people ==
- Tulsiram Sharma Kashyap
- Mohan Gurung
- Damber Pradhan
- Rudra Mani Pradhan
- Milan Sharma
