= Rinchenpong Assembly constituency =

Constituency of the Sikkim legislative assembly in India

Coordinates: 27.24°N 88.27°E

Rinchenpong
- Constituency No. 5 for the Sikkim Legislative Assembly

Constituency details
- Country: India
- Region: Northeast India
- State: Sikkim
- District: West Sikkim
- Lok Sabha constituency: Sikkim
- Established: 1979
- Total electors: 14,756
- Reservation: BL

Member of Legislative Assembly
- 11th Sikkim Legislative Assembly
- Incumbent Erung Tenzing Lepcha
- Party: SKM
- Alliance: NDA
- Elected year: 2024

Rinchenpong is one of the 32 assembly constituencies of Sikkim a north east state of India. Rinchenpong is part of Sikkim Lok Sabha constituency.

This constituency is reserved for members of the Bhutia-Lepcha community.

== Members of the Legislative Assembly ==
Election	Member	Party
1979	Katuk Bhutia	Sikkim Janata Parishad
1985	Ongdi Bhutia	Sikkim Sangram Parishad
1989	Chong Lamu Bhutia	Sikkim Sangram Parishad
1994	Phur Tshering Lepcha	Sikkim Democratic Front
1999	Ongden Tshering Lepcha	Sikkim Democratic Front
2004	Dawcho Lepcha	Sikkim Democratic Front
2009	Dawa Norbu Takarpa	Sikkim Democratic Front
2014	Karma Sonam Lepcha	Sikkim Democratic Front
2019	Karma Sonam Lepcha	Sikkim Democratic Front
2024	Erung Tenzing Lepcha	Sikkim Krantikari Morcha

== Election results ==
=== Assembly Election 2024 ===
2024 Sikkim Legislative Assembly election: Rinchenpong
Party	Candidate	Votes	%	±%
SKM	Erung Tenzing Lepcha	9,624	68.91%	▲25.15
SDF	Norden Bhutia	3,224	23.08%	▼29.16
CAP–Sikkim	Dawa Ongdi Lepcha	552	3.95%	New
BJP	Sancho Lepcha	328	2.35%	▼0.06
NOTA	None of the Above	239	1.71%	▲0.85
Margin of victory		6,400	45.82%	▲37.34
Turnout		13,967	87.16%	▲1.78
Registered electors		16,024		▲8.59
SKM gain from SDF		Swing	▲16.66	

=== Assembly election 2019 ===
2019 Sikkim Legislative Assembly election: Rinchenpong
Party	Candidate	Votes	%	±%
SDF	Karma Sonam Lepcha	6,582	52.24%	▼16.13
SKM	Phurba Tshering Bhutia	5,513	43.76%	▲16.85
BJP	Sancho Lepcha	303	2.40%	▲0.67
NOTA	None of the Above	109	0.87%	▼0.04
INC	Phurchung Lepcha	92	0.73%	▼0.50
Margin of victory		1,069	8.48%	▼32.98
Turnout		12,599	85.38%	▼0.48
Registered electors		14,756		▲17.91
SDF hold		Swing	▼16.13	

=== Assembly election 2014 ===
2014 Sikkim Legislative Assembly election: Rinchenpong
Party	Candidate	Votes	%	±%
SDF	Karma Sonam Lepcha	7,347	68.37%	▼4.32
SKM	Pema Kinzang Bhutia	2,891	26.90%	New
BJP	Laten Tshering Sherpa	186	1.73%	New
INC	Karsang Sherpa	132	1.23%	▼22.99
NOTA	None of the Above	97	0.90%	New
AITC	Phur Tshering Lepcha	93	0.87%	New
Margin of victory		4,456	41.47%	▼7.00
Turnout		10,746	85.86%	▼1.10
Registered electors		12,515		▲22.88
SDF hold		Swing	▼4.32	

=== Assembly election 2009 ===
2009 Sikkim Legislative Assembly election: Rinchenpong
Party	Candidate	Votes	%	±%
SDF	Dawa Norbu Takarpa	6,438	72.69%	▼8.90
INC	Pema Kinzang Bhutia	2,145	24.22%	▲7.90
Sikkim Gorkha Party	Phurba Sherpa	160	1.81%	New
SHRP	Karsang Sherpa	114	1.29%	New
Margin of victory		4,293	48.47%	▼16.79
Turnout		8,857	86.96%	▲5.18
Registered electors		10,185		
SDF hold		Swing	▼8.90	

=== Assembly election 2004 ===
2004 Sikkim Legislative Assembly election: Rinchenpong
Party	Candidate	Votes	%	±%
SDF	Dawcho Lepcha	5,303	81.58%	▲20.14
INC	Pema Kinzang Bhutia	1,061	16.32%	▲11.55
Independent	Nima Sherpa	79	1.22%	New
Independent	Phur Tshering Lepcha	57	0.88%	New
Margin of victory		4,242	65.26%	▲37.59
Turnout		6,500	81.78%	▲0.92
Registered electors		7,948		
SDF hold		Swing	▲20.14	

=== Assembly election 1999 ===
1999 Sikkim Legislative Assembly election: Rinchenpong
Party	Candidate	Votes	%	±%
SDF	Ongden Tshering Lepcha	3,640	61.44%	▲1.05
SSP	Pema Kinzang Bhutia	2,001	33.78%	▲6.13
INC	Phur Tshering Lepcha	283	4.78%	▼4.37
Margin of victory		1,639	27.67%	▼5.08
Turnout		5,924	82.15%	▲4.07
Registered electors		7,326		▲6.81
SDF hold		Swing		

=== Assembly election 1994 ===
1994 Sikkim Legislative Assembly election: Rinchenpong
Party	Candidate	Votes	%	±%
SDF	Phur Tshering Lepcha	3,181	60.39%	New
SSP	Phurba Sherpa	1,456	27.64%	▼42.40
INC	Kintup Bhutia	482	9.15%	▼15.15
Independent	Dawagyatso Lepcha	76	1.44%	New
Independent	Deoman Lama	72	1.37%	New
Margin of victory		1,725	32.75%	▼12.99
Turnout		5,267	78.51%	▲12.74
Registered electors		6,859		▲5.60
SDF gain from SSP		Swing	▼9.65	

=== Assembly election 1989 ===
1989 Sikkim Legislative Assembly election: Rinchenpong
Party	Candidate	Votes	%	±%
SSP	Chong Lamu Bhutia	2,914	70.05%	▲24.11
INC	Phur Tshering Lepcha	1,011	24.30%	▲11.86
RIS	Ugen Palzor Gyalsten	127	3.05%	New
Denzong Peoples Chogpi	Tashi Wongdi Funpo	89	2.14%	New
Margin of victory		1,903	45.75%	▲21.13
Turnout		4,160	66.13%	▲3.58
Registered electors		6,495		▲27.23
SSP hold		Swing	▲24.11	

=== Assembly election 1985 ===
1985 Sikkim Legislative Assembly election: Rinchenpong
Party	Candidate	Votes	%	±%
SSP	Ongdi Bhutia	1,418	45.93%	New
Independent	Degay Bhutia	658	21.32%	New
INC	Phur Tshering Lepcha	384	12.44%	New
Independent	Karma Chuden	330	10.69%	New
Independent	Tashi Lhendup Bhutia	266	8.62%	New
Independent	Phur Tshering Lepcha	31	1.00%	New
Margin of victory		760	24.62%	▲19.12
Turnout		3,087	62.53%	▲2.13
Registered electors		5,105		▲38.84
SSP gain from SJP		Swing	▲18.06	

=== Assembly election 1979 ===
1979 Sikkim Legislative Assembly election: Rinchenpong
Party	Candidate	Votes	%	±%
SJP	Katuk Bhutia	598	27.88%	New
JP	Degey Bhutia	480	22.38%	New
SC (R)	Loday Tshering Bhutia	457	21.31%	New
SPC	Dawa Tshering Sherpa	415	19.35%	New
Independent	Gompoo Namgyal Lepcha	138	6.43%	New
Independent	Lako Tshering Lepcha	57	2.66%	New
Margin of victory		118	5.50%	
Turnout		2,145	62.63%	
Registered electors		3,677		
SJP win (new seat)				

== See also ==
- Richenpong
- West Sikkim district
- List of constituencies of Sikkim Legislative Assembly
