= Karma Loday Bhutia =

Indian politician

Minister of Forest and Environment of Sikkim
- In office 27 May 2019 – 10 June 2024
- Governor: Lakshman Acharya; Ganga Prasad
- Chief Minister: Prem Singh Tamang
- Preceded by: Tshering Wangdi Lepcha
- Succeeded by: Pintso Namgyal Lepcha

Minister of Mines and Geology of Sikkim
- In office 27 May 2019 – 10 June 2024
- Governor: Lakshman Acharya; Ganga Prasad
- Chief Minister: Prem Singh Tamang
- Preceded by: Tshering Wangdi Lepcha
- Succeeded by: Pintso Namgyal Lepcha

Minister of Science and Technology of Sikkim
- In office 27 May 2019 – 10 June 2024
- Governor: Lakshman Acharya; Ganga Prasad
- Chief Minister: Prem Singh Tamang
- Preceded by: Tshering Wangdi Lepcha
- Succeeded by: Pintso Namgyal Lepcha

Member of the Sikkim Legislative Assembly
- In office 3 June 2019 – 2 June 2024
- Preceded by: Ugen Nedup Bhutia
- Succeeded by: Thenlay Tshering Bhutia
- Constituency: Kabi Lungchok

Personal details
- Born: Karma Loday Bhutia
- Party: Sikkim Krantikari Morcha
- Other political affiliations: Sikkim Democratic Front
- Education: B.A, North Bengal University
- Profession: Retired government employee

Karma Loday Bhutia is an Indian politician from Sikkim. He was elected to the Sikkim Legislative Assembly in 2019.

== Political career ==
=== Elections ===
In 2019 Bhutia stood for election on a Sikkim Krantikari Morcha (SKM) ticket from the Kabi Lungchok seat in the Sikkim Legislative Assembly. He won against the Sikkim Democratic Front candidate, Ugen Nedup Bhutia by a margin of over 1437 votes in the 2019 Sikkim Legislative Assembly election. Following his victory, Bhutia was inducted in the P. S. Golay's Cabinet with the following portfolios: forest and environment; mines and geology; and science and technology.

For the 2024 Sikkim Legislative Assembly election, Bhutia was denied SKM party ticket to represent the same constituency. SKM instead chose Thenlay Tshering Bhutia to represent the party in the assembly seat, who eventually won the election. Few days after the results were declared, SKM expelled Karma Bhutia from the party due to allegations of engaging in anti-party activities after being denied the ticket to represent the seat.

=== Political issues ===
On 5 November 2023, at the annual convention of the Sikkim Bhutia Lepcha Apex Committee, Bhutia called for a proportionate increase of Bhutia Lepcha seats in the Sikkim Legislative Assembly. Then, the community held 13 seats, including the Sangha seat.
