= Kabi–Lungchok Assembly constituency =

Constituency of the Sikkim legislative assembly in India

Coordinates: 27.40°N 88.61°E

Kabi Lungchok
- Constituency No. 29 for the Sikkim Legislative Assembly

Constituency details
- Country: India
- Region: Northeast India
- State: Sikkim
- District: Mangan
- Lok Sabha constituency: Sikkim
- Established: 2008
- Total electors: 12,661
- Reservation: BL

Member of Legislative Assembly
- 11th Sikkim Legislative Assembly
- Incumbent Thenlay Tshering Bhutia
- Party: SKM
- Alliance: NDA
- Elected year: 2024

Kabi Lungchok Assembly constituency is one of the 32 assembly constituencies of Sikkim, It lies on Gangtok district and Mangan district. This constituency falls under Sikkim Lok Sabha constituency.

This constituency is reserved for members of the Bhutia-Lepcha community.

== Members of the Legislative Assembly ==
Election	Member	Party
2009	Thenlay Tshering Bhutia	Sikkim Democratic Front
2014	Ugen Nedup Bhutia	Sikkim Krantikari Morcha
2019	Karma Loday Bhutia	Sikkim Krantikari Morcha
2024	Thenlay Tshering Bhutia	Sikkim Krantikari Morcha

== Election results ==
=== Assembly Election 2024 ===
2024 Sikkim Legislative Assembly election: Kabi–Lungchok
Party	Candidate	Votes	%	±%
SKM	Thenlay Tshering Bhutia	5,882	54.18%	▼0.89
SDF	Gnawo Chopel Lepcha	4,189	38.59%	▼2.61
BJP	Ugen Nedup Bhutia	589	5.43%	New
NOTA	None of the Above	196	1.81%	▲0.87
Margin of victory		1,693	15.60%	▲1.72
Turnout		10,856	82.19%	▲0.36
Registered electors		13,209		▲4.33
SKM hold		Swing	▼0.89	

=== Assembly election 2019 ===
2019 Sikkim Legislative Assembly election: Kabi–Lungchok
Party	Candidate	Votes	%	±%
SKM	Karma Loday Bhutia	5,705	55.07%	▲5.88
SDF	Ugen Nedup Bhutia	4,268	41.20%	▼6.64
Independent	Phurden Tshering Lepcha	152	1.47%	New
INC	Gyurmik Yauseel Bhutia	138	1.33%	▼0.02
NOTA	None of the Above	97	0.94%	▼0.68
Margin of victory		1,437	13.87%	▲12.53
Turnout		10,360	81.83%	▼3.00
Registered electors		12,661		▲14.47
SKM hold		Swing	▲5.88	

=== Assembly election 2014 ===
2014 Sikkim Legislative Assembly election: Kabi–Lungchok
Party	Candidate	Votes	%	±%
SKM	Ugen Nedup Bhutia	4,615	49.18%	New
SDF	Thenlay Tshering Bhutia	4,489	47.84%	▼16.62
NOTA	None of the Above	152	1.62%	New
INC	Karma Tashi Bhutia	127	1.35%	▼34.19
Margin of victory		126	1.34%	▼27.58
Turnout		9,383	84.83%	▼0.53
Registered electors		11,061		▲26.20
SKM gain from SDF		Swing	▼15.28	

=== Assembly election 2009 ===
2009 Sikkim Legislative Assembly election: Kabi–Lungchok
Party	Candidate	Votes	%	±%
SDF	Thenlay Tshering Bhutia	4,823	64.46%	New
INC	Ugen Nedup Bhutia	2,659	35.54%	New
Margin of victory		2,164	28.92%	
Turnout		7,482	85.36%	
Registered electors		8,765		
SDF win (new seat)				

== See also ==
- Sikkim Lok Sabha constituency
- Kabi Lungchok
- Mangan district
