= Pintso Namgyal Lepcha =

Indian politician

Minister of Forest and Environment of Sikkim
- Incumbent
- Assumed office 11 June 2024
- Governor: Lakshman Acharya; Om Prakash Mathur
- Chief Minister: Prem Singh Tamang
- Preceded by: Karma Loday Bhutia

Minister of Mines and Geology of Sikkim
- Incumbent
- Assumed office 11 June 2024
- Governor: Lakshman Acharya; Om Prakash Mathur
- Chief Minister: Prem Singh Tamang
- Preceded by: Karma Loday Bhutia

Minister of Science and Technology of Sikkim
- Incumbent
- Assumed office 11 June 2024
- Governor: Lakshman Acharya; Om Prakash Mathur
- Chief Minister: Prem Singh Tamang
- Preceded by: Karma Loday Bhutia

Member of the Sikkim Legislative Assembly
- Incumbent
- Assumed office 3 June 2019
- Preceded by: Sonam Gyatso Lepcha
- Constituency: Djongu

Personal details
- Born: Pintso Namgyal Lepcha; 3 December 1974 (age 51) Sikkim, India
- Party: Sikkim Krantikari Morcha
- Other political affiliations: Sikkim Democratic Front, Bharatiya Janata Party
- Spouse: Lhakmit Lepcha

Pintso Namgyal Lepcha is a Sikkim Krantikari Morcha politician from Sikkim. He has been elected in Sikkim Legislative Assembly election in 2014 and 2019 from Djongu constituency as candidate of Sikkim Democratic Front but later he joined Bharatiya Janata Party. He later joined Sikkim Krantikari Morcha. He has been elected in Sikkim Legislative Assembly election in 2024 as a Sikkim Krantikari Morcha candidate.
