= Djongu Assembly constituency =

Constituency of the Sikkim legislative assembly in India

Coordinates: 27.54°N 88.49°E

Djongu
- Constituency No. 30 for the Sikkim Legislative Assembly

Constituency details
- Country: India
- Region: Northeast India
- State: Sikkim
- District: Mangan
- Lok Sabha constituency: Sikkim
- Established: 1979
- Total electors: 9,595
- Reservation: BL

Member of Legislative Assembly
- 11th Sikkim Legislative Assembly
- Incumbent Pintso Namgyal Lepcha
- Party: SKM
- Alliance: NDA
- Elected year: 2024

Djongu Assembly constituency is one of the 32 assembly constituencies of Sikkim, a north east state of India. This constituency falls under Sikkim Lok Sabha constituency.

This constituency is reserved for members of the Bhutia-Lepcha community.

== Members of the Legislative Assembly ==
Year	Member	Party
1979	Athup Lepcha	Sikkim Janata Parishad
1985	Sonam Chyoda Lepcha	Sikkim Sangram Parishad
1989	Sonam Chyoda Lepcha	Sikkim Sangram Parishad
1994	Sonam Chyoda Lepcha	Indian National Congress
1999	Sonam Gyatso Lepcha	Sikkim Sangram Parishad
2004	Sonam Gyatso Lepcha	Sikkim Democratic Front
2009	Sonam Gyatso Lepcha	Sikkim Democratic Front
2014	Sonam Gyatso Lepcha	Sikkim Democratic Front
2019	Pintso Namgyal Lepcha	Sikkim Democratic Front
2024	Pintso Namgyal Lepcha	Sikkim Krantikari Morcha

== Election results ==
Vote share of Winning candidates
2024	69.56%
2019	66.17%
2014	63.67%
2009	79.97%
2004	65.34%
1999	51.66%
1994	40.32%
1989	73.02%
1985	62.83%
1979	45.79%

=== Assembly election 2024 ===
2024 Sikkim Legislative Assembly election: Djongu
Party	Candidate	Votes	%	±%
SKM	Pintso Namgyal Lepcha	6,402	69.56%	▲38.77
SDF	Sonam Gyatso Lepcha	1,395	15.16%	▼51.01
CAP–Sikkim	Jorbu Tshering Lepcha	1,190	12.93%	New
BJP	Penzong Lepcha	148	1.61%	New
NOTA	None of the Above	68	0.74%	▲0.14
Margin of victory		5,007	54.41%	▲19.03
Turnout		9,203	87.46%	▼0.95
Registered electors		10,523		▲9.67
SKM gain from SDF		Swing	▲3.40	

=== Assembly election 2019 ===
2019 Sikkim Legislative Assembly election: Djongu
Party	Candidate	Votes	%	±%
SDF	Pintso Namgyal Lepcha	5,613	66.17%	▲2.50
SKM	Chungkipu Lepcha	2,612	30.79%	▼2.89
INC	Penzong Lepcha	119	1.40%	▼0.04
HSP	Athup Lepcha	88	1.04%	New
NOTA	None of the Above	51	0.60%	▼0.60
Margin of victory		3,001	35.38%	▲5.39
Turnout		8,483	88.41%	▼0.40
Registered electors		9,595		▲17.49
SDF hold		Swing	▲2.50	

=== Assembly election 2014 ===
2014 Sikkim Legislative Assembly election: Djongu
Party	Candidate	Votes	%	±%
SDF	Sonam Gyatso Lepcha	4,618	63.67%	▼16.30
SKM	Dawa Tshering Lepcha	2,443	33.68%	New
INC	Penzong Lepcha	105	1.45%	▼12.32
NOTA	None of the Above	87	1.20%	New
Margin of victory		2,175	29.99%	▼36.21
Turnout		7,253	88.81%	▼0.98
Registered electors		8,167		▲23.31
SDF hold		Swing	▼16.30	

=== Assembly election 2009 ===
2009 Sikkim Legislative Assembly election: Djongu
Party	Candidate	Votes	%	±%
SDF	Sonam Gyatso Lepcha	4,756	79.97%	▲14.64
INC	Norden Tshering Lepcha	819	13.77%	▼20.89
Independent	Tseten Dorjee Lepcha	372	6.26%	New
Margin of victory		3,937	66.20%	▲35.53
Turnout		5,947	89.79%	▲3.09
Registered electors		6,623		
SDF hold		Swing		

=== Assembly election 2004 ===
2004 Sikkim Legislative Assembly election: Djongu
Party	Candidate	Votes	%	±%
SDF	Sonam Gyatso Lepcha	3,344	65.34%	▲17.36
INC	Sonam Chyoda Lepcha	1,774	34.66%	New
Margin of victory		1,570	30.68%	▲26.99
Turnout		5,118	86.70%	▲1.79
Registered electors		5,903		
SDF gain from SSP		Swing		

=== Assembly election 1999 ===
1999 Sikkim Legislative Assembly election: Djongu
Party	Candidate	Votes	%	±%
SSP	Sonam Gyatso Lepcha	2,399	51.66%	▲12.56
SDF	Sonam Chyoda Lepcha	2,228	47.98%	▲27.63
Margin of victory		171	3.68%	▲2.46
Turnout		4,644	86.40%	▲4.18
Registered electors		5,469		▲14.87
SSP gain from INC		Swing		

=== Assembly election 1994 ===
1994 Sikkim Legislative Assembly election: Djongu
Party	Candidate	Votes	%	±%
INC	Sonam Chyoda Lepcha	1,550	40.32%	▲14.85
SSP	Sonam Dorjee Lepcha	1,503	39.10%	▼33.92
SDF	Chophel Lepcha	782	20.34%	New
Margin of victory		47	1.22%	▼46.32
Turnout		3,844	83.09%	▲3.22
Registered electors		4,761		▲16.07
INC gain from SSP		Swing		

=== Assembly election 1989 ===
1989 Sikkim Legislative Assembly election: Djongu
Party	Candidate	Votes	%	±%
SSP	Sonam Chyoda Lepcha	2,322	73.02%	▲10.19
INC	Athup Lepcha	810	25.47%	▼7.25
RIS	Chuden Lepcha	48	1.51%	New
Margin of victory		1,512	47.55%	▲17.44
Turnout		3,180	79.60%	▲12.38
Registered electors		4,102		▲14.29
SSP hold		Swing		

=== Assembly election 1985 ===
1985 Sikkim Legislative Assembly election: Djongu
Party	Candidate	Votes	%	±%
SSP	Sonam Chyoda Lepcha	1,469	62.83%	New
INC	Athup Lepcha	765	32.72%	New
JP	Ongden Lepcha	46	1.97%	▼24.66
Independent	Nima Thomas Lepcha	38	1.63%	New
Independent	Chhuden Lepcha	20	0.86%	New
Margin of victory		704	30.11%	▲10.95
Turnout		2,338	66.84%	▲0.47
Registered electors		3,589		▲22.87
SSP gain from SJP		Swing	▲17.04	

=== Assembly election 1979 ===
1979 Sikkim Legislative Assembly election: Djongu
Party	Candidate	Votes	%	±%
SJP	Athup Lepcha	865	45.79%	New
JP	Kazi Lhendup Dorjee Kangsarpa	503	26.63%	New
SPC	Pintook Lepcha	343	18.16%	New
Independent	Sonam Chyoda Lepcha	178	9.42%	New
Margin of victory		362	19.16%	
Turnout		1,889	68.16%	
Registered electors		2,921		
SJP win (new seat)				

== See also ==
- Sikkim Lok Sabha constituency
- Mangan district
