= Bishnu Kumar Sharma =

Indian politician

Member of Sikkim Legislative Assembly
- In office May 2019 – May 2024
- Preceded by: Hemendra Adhikari
- Succeeded by: Prem Singh Tamang
- Constituency: Rhenock

Personal details
- Born: 1955 (age 70–71) Rhenock
- Party: Sikkim Krantikari Morcha
- Parent: Gauri Shanker Sharma (father)
- Education: Padamchey Primary School
- Profession: Politician

Bishnu Kumar Sharma (born 1955) is an Indian politician from Sikkim. He is a member of the Sikkim Legislative Assembly representing Sikkim Krantikari Morcha from Rhenock (East) Assembly constituency in Pakyong district. He won the 2019 Sikkim Legislative Assembly election.

== Early life and education ==
Sharma is from Rhenock. His is born to late Gauri Shanker Sharma. He studied only till Class V at Padamchey Primary School.

== Career ==
Sharma won the 2019 Sikkim Legislative Assembly election as a representative of Sikkim Krantikari Morcha from Rhenock East Assembly constituency. He defeated Hemendra Adhikari of Sikkim Democratic Front by a margin of 3,086 votes. In August 2023, he was inducted as Culture and Printing and Stationery minister.
