= Farwanti Tamang =

Indian politician

Member of Sikkim Legislative Assembly
- In office May 2019 – May 2024
- Preceded by: Tulshi Devi Rai
- Succeeded by: Nar Bahadur Pradhan
- Constituency: Melli

Personal details
- Party: Bharatiya Janata Party
- Other political affiliations: Sikkim Democratic Front

Farwanti Tamang is a Bharatiya Janata Party politician from Sikkim. She has been elected in Sikkim Legislative Assembly election in 2019 from Melli constituency as candidate of Sikkim Democratic Front but later she joined Bharatiya Janata Party.
