= Nar Bahadur Pradhan =

Indian politician

Member of Sikkim Legislative Assembly
- Incumbent
- Assumed office 1 June 2024
- Preceded by: Farwanti Tamang
- Constituency: Melli

Nar Bahadur Pradhan is an Indian politician from Sikkim belonging from the Sikkim Krantikari Morcha. He is a member of the Legislative Assembly in the 11th Sikkim Legislative Assembly. He won over Citizen Action Party's Ganesh Rai with 7904 votes. a margin of 4283.
