= Rikshal Dorjee Bhutia =

Indian politician

Member of Sikkim Legislative Assembly
- Incumbent
- Assumed office 1 June 2024
- Preceded by: Tashi Thendup Bhutia
- Constituency: Barfung

Personal details
- Political party: Sikkim Krantikari Morcha

Rikshal Dorjee Bhutia is an Indian politician from Sikkim belonging from the Sikkim Krantikari Morcha. He is a member of the Legislative Assembly in the 11th Sikkim Legislative Assembly. He won over SDF's candidate and former Indian football captain Bhaichung Bhutia with 8358 votes.

== Education ==
He graduated from University of North Bengal in 1994.
