= Wak Assembly constituency =

Constituency of the Sikkim legislative assembly in India

Coordinates: 27.21°N 88.35°E

Wak
- Former constituency for the Sikkim Legislative Assembly

Constituency details
- Country: India
- Region: Northeast India
- State: Sikkim
- Established: 1979
- Abolished: 2008
- Total electors: 6,956

Wak Assembly constituency was an assembly constituency in the Indian state of Sikkim.

== Members of the Legislative Assembly ==
Election	Member	Party
1979	Garjaman Gurung	Sikkim Prajatantra Congress
1985	Bedu Singh Chettri	Sikkim Sangram Parishad
1989	Bedu Singh Panth	Sikkim Sangram Parishad
1994	Kedar Nath Rai	Sikkim Democratic Front
1999	Kedar Nath Rai	Sikkim Democratic Front
2004	Chandra Bahadur Karki	Sikkim Democratic Front

== Election results ==
=== Assembly election 2004 ===
2004 Sikkim Legislative Assembly election: Wak
Party	Candidate	Votes	%	±%
SDF	Chandra Bahadur Karki	Unopposed		
Registered electors		6,956		▲13.25
SDF hold		Swing		

=== Assembly election 1999 ===
1999 Sikkim Legislative Assembly election: Wak
Party	Candidate	Votes	%	±%
SDF	Kedar Nath Rai	3,284	65.79%	▲12.77
SSP	Manoj Rai	1,683	33.71%	▼0.13
Margin of victory		1,601	32.07%	▲12.90
Turnout		4,992	82.37%	▲0.44
Registered electors		6,142		▲14.40
SDF hold		Swing	▲12.77	

=== Assembly election 1994 ===
1994 Sikkim Legislative Assembly election: Wak
Party	Candidate	Votes	%	±%
SDF	Kedar Nath Rai	2,301	53.02%	New
SSP	Bedu Singh Panth	1,469	33.85%	▼54.78
INC	Chandra Lal Rai	495	11.41%	▲4.42
Independent	Manoj Rai	66	1.52%	New
Margin of victory		832	19.17%	▼62.47
Turnout		4,340	82.88%	▲17.90
Registered electors		5,369		
SDF gain from SSP		Swing	▼35.61	

=== Assembly election 1989 ===
1989 Sikkim Legislative Assembly election: Wak
Party	Candidate	Votes	%	±%
SSP	Bedu Singh Panth	2,930	88.63%	▲19.53
INC	Suk Bahadur Rai	231	6.99%	▼18.88
RIS	Kul Bahadur Rai	145	4.39%	New
Margin of victory		2,699	81.64%	▲38.41
Turnout		3,306	65.07%	▲1.22
Registered electors		5,253		
SSP hold		Swing		

=== Assembly election 1985 ===
1985 Sikkim Legislative Assembly election: Wak
Party	Candidate	Votes	%	±%
SSP	Bedu Singh Chettri	1,704	69.10%	New
INC	Chandra Das Rai	638	25.87%	▲22.67
Independent	Sonam Pintso Takapa	78	3.16%	New
Independent	Prem Singh Rai	19	0.77%	New
Independent	Kharka Bahadur Rai	15	0.61%	New
Margin of victory		1,066	43.23%	▲36.68
Turnout		2,466	63.19%	▲8.79
Registered electors		3,996		▲44.26
SSP gain from SPC		Swing	▲34.72	

=== Assembly election 1979 ===
1979 Sikkim Legislative Assembly election: Wak
Party	Candidate	Votes	%	±%
SPC	Garjaman Gurung	504	34.38%	New
SJP	Durga Prasad Rajalim	408	27.83%	New
JP	Pandu Ram Rai	175	11.94%	New
SC (R)	Passang Sherpu	147	10.03%	New
Independent	Sonam Tobden Bhutia	116	7.91%	New
INC	Suraj Kumar Khartam	47	3.21%	New
Independent	Nimu Tenzing Bhutia	29	1.98%	New
Independent	Gyampo Bhutia	17	1.16%	New
Independent	Dojee Dazom Bhutia	14	0.95%	New
Independent	Norden Bhutia	9	0.61%	New
Margin of victory		96	6.55%	
Turnout		1,466	59.68%	
Registered electors		2,770		
SPC win (new seat)				
