= Krishna Bahadur Rai (Indian politician) =

Indian politician (died 2026)

Member of Sikkim Legislative Assembly
- In office 2019–2024
- Preceded by: Bikram Pradhan
- Succeeded by: Puran Kumar Gurung
- Constituency: Chujachen

Personal details
- Died: 17 November 2026
- Party: Bharatiya Janata Party (from 2019)
- Other political affiliations: Sikkim Democratic Front

Krishna Bahadur Rai (died 17 November 2026) was an Indian Bharatiya Janata Party politician from Sikkim. He was elected in Sikkim Legislative Assembly election in 2019 from Chujachen constituency as candidate of Sikkim Democratic Front but later he joined Bharatiya Janata Party. Rai died after a long illness on 17 November 2026.
