= Dorjee Dazom Bhutia =

Indian politician

Dorjee Dazom Bhutia is a Sikkim Democratic Front politician from Sikkim. He was elected in Sikkim Legislative Assembly election in 2014 from Barfung constituency as candidate of Sikkim Democratic Front. He was minister of Energy & Power and Labour in Pawan Chamling fifth ministry from 2014 to 2019.

== Electoral performance ==
| Election | Constituency | Party | Result | Votes % | Opposition Candidate | Opposition Party | Opposition vote % | Ref |
|---|---|---|---|---|---|---|---|---|
| 2014 | Barfung | SDF | Won | 63.79% | Pema Wangyal Bhutia | SKM | 33.24% | |
| 2004 | Ralong | SDF | Won | 77.32% | Chozang Bhutia | INC | 22.68% | |
| 1999 | Ralong | SDF | Won | 52.84% | Ugen Tashi Bhutia | SSP | 25.54% | |
| 1994 | Ralong | SDF | Won | 44.82% | Ugen Tashi Bhutia | SSP | 25.22% | |
| 1989 | Ralong | INC | Lost | 9.00% | Sonam Gyatso Kaleon | SSP | 89.74% | |
