= Karma Sonam Lepcha =

Indian politician

MLA Karma Sonam Lepcha

Member of Sikkim Legislative Assembly
- In office 2014–2024
- Preceded by: Dawa Norbu Takarpa
- Succeeded by: Erung Tenzing Lepcha
- Constituency: Rinchenpong

Personal details
- Party: Bharatiya Janata Party (from 2019)

Karma Sonam Lepcha is a Bharatiya Janata Party politician from Sikkim. He has been elected in Sikkim Legislative Assembly election in 2014 and 2019 from Rinchenpong constituency as candidate of Sikkim Democratic Front but later he joined Bharatiya Janata Party.
