= Barfung Assembly constituency =

Constituency of the Sikkim legislative assembly in India

Coordinates: 27.294°N 88.353°E

Barfung
- Constituency No. 9 for the Sikkim Legislative Assembly

Constituency details
- Country: India
- Region: Northeast India
- State: Sikkim
- District: Namchi
- Lok Sabha constituency: Sikkim
- Established: 2008
- Reservation: BL

Member of Legislative Assembly
- 11th Sikkim Legislative Assembly
- Incumbent Rikshal Dorjee Bhutia
- Party: SKM
- Alliance: NDA
- Elected year: 2024

Barfung Assembly constituency is one of the 32 assembly constituencies of Sikkim, a northeast state of India. Barfung is part of Sikkim Lok Sabha constituency.

This constituency is reserved for members of the Bhutia-Lepcha community.

== Members of the Legislative Assembly ==
Election	Member	Party
2009	Sonam Gyatso Bhutia	Sikkim Democratic Front
2014	Dorjee Dazom Bhutia	Sikkim Democratic Front
2019	Tashi Thendup Bhutia	Sikkim Democratic Front
2024	Rikshal Dorjee Bhutia	Sikkim Krantikari Morcha

== Election results ==
=== Assembly election 2009 ===
2009 Sikkim Legislative Assembly election: Barfung
Party	Candidate	Votes	%	±%
SDF	Sonam Gyatso Bhutia	6,049	70.35%	New
INC	Lobzang Bhutia	2,197	25.55%	New
Independent	Sonam Pintso Bhutia	352	4.09%	New
Margin of victory		3,852	44.80%	
Turnout		8,598	85.78%	
Registered electors		10,023		
SDF win (new seat)				

=== Assembly election 2014 ===
2014 Sikkim Legislative Assembly election: Barfung
Party	Candidate	Votes	%	±%
SDF	Dorjee Dazom Bhutia	6,639	63.79%	▼6.57
SKM	Pema Wangyal Bhutia	3,460	33.24%	New
NOTA	None of the Above	197	1.89%	New
INC	Dadul Lepcha	112	1.08%	▼24.48
Margin of victory		3,179	30.54%	▼14.26
Turnout		10,408	84.73%	▼1.05
Registered electors		12,283		▲22.55
SDF hold		Swing	▼6.57	

=== Assembly election 2019 ===
2019 Sikkim Legislative Assembly election: Barfung
Party	Candidate	Votes	%	±%
SDF	Tashi Thendup Bhutia	5,936	49.13%	▼14.66
SKM	Lobzang Bhutia	5,839	48.32%	▲15.08
SRP	Mingma Tshring Sherpa	169	1.40%	New
NOTA	None of the Above	139	1.15%	▼0.74
Margin of victory		97	0.80%	▼29.74
Turnout		12,083	81.23%	▼3.50
Registered electors		14,875		▲21.10
SDF hold		Swing	▼14.66	

=== Assembly election 2024 ===
2024 Sikkim Legislative Assembly election: Barfung
Party	Candidate	Votes	%	±%
SKM	Rikshal Dorjee Bhutia	8,358	61.86%	▲13.54
SDF	Bhaichung Bhutia	4.012	29.69%	▼18.63
Citizen Action Party – Sikkim	Dadul Lepcha	656	4.85%	New
BJP	Tashi Dadul Bhutia	298	2.21%	N/A
NOTA	None of the Above	188	1.39%	▲0.24
Margin of victory		4,346	32.16%	▲31.36
Turnout		13,512		
Registered electors				
SKM gain from SDF		Swing		

== See also ==
- Namchi district
- List of constituencies of Sikkim Legislative Assembly
