= Erung Tenzing Lepcha =

Indian politician

Member of Sikkim Legislative Assembly
- Incumbent
- Assumed office 1 June 2024
- Preceded by: Karma Sonam Lepcha
- Constituency: Rinchenpong

Personal details
- Born: June 17, 1991 (age 35)
- Party: Sikkim Krantikari Morcha
- Education: University of Delhi

Erung Tenzing Lepcha (born 17 June 1991) is an Indian politician from Sikkim belonging from the Sikkim Krantikari Morcha. He is a member of the Legislative Assembly in the 11th Sikkim Legislative Assembly. He won with over 9624 votes. In 2025, he won the Best Indian Golden Personalities Award 2025.

== Education ==
He graduated from the University of Delhi with a Bachelor of Arts degree in 2013
