= Geyzing Assembly constituency =

Constituency of the Sikkim legislative assembly in India

Coordinates: 27.29°N 88.26°E

Geyzing
- Former constituency for the Sikkim Legislative Assembly

Constituency details
- Country: India
- Region: Northeast India
- State: Sikkim
- Established: 1979
- Abolished: 2008
- Total electors: 8,574

Geyzing was an assembly constituency in the Indian state of Sikkim.

== Members of the Legislative Assembly ==
Election	Member	Party
1979	Indra Bahadur Limboo	Sikkim Janata Parishad
1985	Man Bahadur Dahal	Sikkim Sangram Parishad
1989	Man Bahadur Dahal	Sikkim Sangram Parishad
1994	Dal Bahadur Gurung	Sikkim Democratic Front
1999	Sher Bahadur Subedi	Sikkim Democratic Front
2004	Sher Bahadur Subedi	Sikkim Democratic Front

== Election results ==
=== Assembly election 2004 ===
2004 Sikkim Legislative Assembly election: Geyzing
Party	Candidate	Votes	%	±%
SDF	Sher Bahadur Subedi	4,227	62.44%	▲7.87
INC	Dal Bahadur Gurung	2,410	35.60%	▲31.37
Independent	Dhan Bahadur Gurung	69	1.02%	New
Independent	Chandra Bahadur Katwal	64	0.95%	New
Margin of victory		1,817	26.84%	▲13.48
Turnout		6,770	78.96%	▼1.31
Registered electors		8,574		▲13.25
SDF hold		Swing	▲7.87	

=== Assembly election 1999 ===
1999 Sikkim Legislative Assembly election: Geyzing
Party	Candidate	Votes	%	±%
SDF	Sher Bahadur Subedi	3,316	54.57%	▲3.30
SSP	Puspak Ram Subba	2,504	41.20%	▲16.18
INC	Man Bahadur Dahal	257	4.23%	▼12.25
Margin of victory		812	13.36%	▼12.88
Turnout		6,077	82.54%	▼0.26
Registered electors		7,571		▲8.03
SDF hold		Swing	▲3.30	

=== Assembly election 1994 ===
1994 Sikkim Legislative Assembly election: Geyzing
Party	Candidate	Votes	%	±%
SDF	Dal Bahadur Gurung	2,893	51.27%	New
SSP	Dal Bahadur Karki	1,412	25.02%	▼47.38
INC	Bhim Narayan Tewari	930	16.48%	▲10.14
Independent	Nar Bahadur Dahal	319	5.65%	New
Independent	Devi Prasad Chettri	80	1.42%	New
Margin of victory		1,481	26.24%	▼24.91
Turnout		5,643	82.56%	▲12.77
Registered electors		7,008		
SDF gain from SSP		Swing	▼21.14	

=== Assembly election 1989 ===
1989 Sikkim Legislative Assembly election: Geyzing
Party	Candidate	Votes	%	±%
SSP	Man Bahadur Dahal	3,175	72.41%	▲17.41
RIS	Garjaman Subba	932	21.25%	New
INC	Ram Maya Chetri	278	6.34%	▼9.88
Margin of victory		2,243	51.15%	▲18.42
Turnout		4,385	70.57%	▲7.69
Registered electors		6,472		
SSP hold		Swing		

=== Assembly election 1985 ===
1985 Sikkim Legislative Assembly election: Geyzing
Party	Candidate	Votes	%	±%
SSP	Man Bahadur Dahal	1,702	54.99%	New
Independent	Dawa Norbu Kazi	689	22.26%	New
INC	Nanda Kumar Subedi	502	16.22%	New
JP	Aita Raj Limboo	64	2.07%	▼10.09
Independent	Pharsa Man Limboo	55	1.78%	New
Independent	Dal Bahadur Karki	31	1.00%	New
Independent	Ganga Prasad Sharma	24	0.78%	New
Independent	Mehar Man Gurung	23	0.74%	New
Margin of victory		1,013	32.73%	▲25.83
Turnout		3,095	62.84%	▼13.24
Registered electors		5,153		▲55.12
SSP gain from SJP		Swing	▲21.69	

=== Assembly election 1979 ===
1979 Sikkim Legislative Assembly election: Geyzing
Party	Candidate	Votes	%	±%
SJP	Indra Bahadur Limboo	811	33.31%	New
SC (R)	Nanda Kumar Subedi	643	26.41%	New
JP	Dudraj Gurung	296	12.16%	New
SPC	Dhan Bahadur Basnet	218	8.95%	New
Independent	Padam Dhoj Limbu	142	5.83%	New
Independent	Kancho Bhutia	110	4.52%	New
Independent	Chatra Bahadur Chhetri	62	2.55%	New
Independent	Purna Bahadur Limboo	59	2.42%	New
Independent	Pharsa Man Limbu	42	1.72%	New
Independent	Prem Prakash Sahay	27	1.11%	New
Independent	Ras Bahadur Sanyashi	25	1.03%	New
Margin of victory		168	6.90%	
Turnout		2,435	78.90%	
Registered electors		3,322		
SJP win (new seat)				
