= Tulshi Devi Rai =

Indian politician

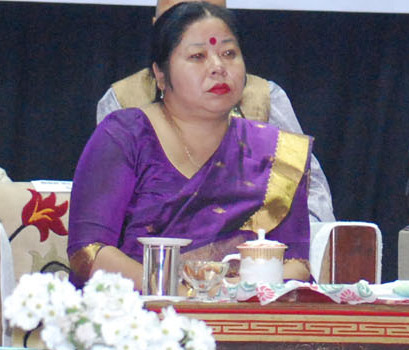
- Tulshi Devi Rai in 2018

Member of Sikkim Legislative Assembly
- In office 2009–2014
- Preceded by: Girish Chandra Rai
- Succeeded by: Farwanti Tamang
- Constituency: Melli

Personal details
- Party: Sikkim Democratic Front
- Spouse: Ganesh Kumar Rai

Tulsi Devi Rai is a Sikkim Democratic Front politician from Sikkim. She was elected in Sikkim Legislative Assembly election in 2009 and 2014 from Melli constituency as candidate of Sikkim Democratic Front. She was minister of Water Security, Public Health Engineering, Social Justice, Empowerment & Welfare Departments in the Fifth Chamling ministry from 2014 to 2019.
