= Tshering Thendup Bhutia =

Indian politician

- छिरिङ टी. भुटिया

Minister of Commerce and Industries of Sikkim
- Incumbent
- Assumed office 11 June 2024
- Governor: Lakshman Acharya; Om Prakash Mathur
- chief minister: Prem Singh Tamang
- Preceded by: Bedu Singh Panth

Minister of Tourism and Civil Aviation of Sikkim
- Incumbent
- Assumed office 11 June 2024
- Governor: Lakshman Acharya; Om Prakash Mathur
- chief minister: Prem Singh Tamang
- Preceded by: Bedu Singh Panth

Member of the Sikkim Legislative Assembly
- Incumbent
- Assumed office June 2024
- Preceded by: Sangay Lepcha
- Constituency: Yoksam–Tashiding

Personal details
- Born: 1965 (age 60–61) Pelling, Yuksom
- Party: Sikkim Krantikari Morcha
- Spouse: Chachudem Bhutia
- Children: 1
- Education: Bachelor of Commerce
- Alma mater: University of North Bengal
- Occupation: Politician

Tshering Thendup Bhutia (born 1965) is an Indian politician from Sikkim. He is a member of the Legislative Assembly from Yoksam–Tashiding Assembly constituency in Gyalshing district representing Sikkim Krantikari Morcha. He won the 2024 Sikkim Legislative Assembly election.

== Early life and education ==
Bhutia is from Yuksom Tashiding. His father's name is Topgay Bhutia. He completed his Bachelor of Commerce at University of North Bengal in 1989. He is a retired government employee. He served as Block Development Officer at BAC Chongrang and as Sub Divisional Magistrate at Yuksom Sub Division.

== Career ==
Bhutia won the 2024 Sikkim Legislative Assembly election from Yoksam Tashiding Assembly Constituency representing Sikkim Krantikari Morcha. He defeated Meewang Gyatso Bhutia of Sikkim Democratic Front by a margin of 4,812 votes.
