= Sangay Lepcha =

Indian politician

Member of Sikkim Legislative Assembly
- In office May 2019 – May 2024
- Preceded by: Sonam Dadul Bhutia
- Succeeded by: Tshering Thendup Bhutia
- Constituency: Yoksam–Tashiding

Dy. Speaker of the Sikkim Legislative Assembly
- In office 2019 – 11 June 2024
- Preceded by: Sonam Gyatso Lepcha
- Succeeded by: Raj Kumari Thapa
- Constituency: Yoksam–Tashiding

Personal details
- Born: Sangay Lepcha
- Party: Sikkim Krantikari Morcha
- Profession: Retired Government Servant

Sangay Lepcha is an Indian politician. He was elected to the Sikkim Legislative Assembly from Yoksam–Tashiding in the 2019 Sikkim Legislative Assembly election as a member of the Sikkim Krantikari Morcha. He is Deputy Speaker of the Sikkim Legislative Assembly. He is also elected as Pro tem Speaker of Sikkim Legislative Assembly in 2019.

== Electoral performance ==
| Election | Constituency | Party | Result | Votes % | Opposition Candidate | Opposition Party | Opposition vote % | Ref |
|---|---|---|---|---|---|---|---|---|
| 2019 | Yoksam–Tashiding | SKM | Won | 48.52% | Dichen Wangchuk Bhutia | SDF | 47.84% | |
