= 1994 Sikkim Legislative Assembly election =

Legislative Assembly election in Sikkim State, India

- 16 November 1994

All 32 seats in the Sikkim Legislative Assembly 17 seats needed for a majority
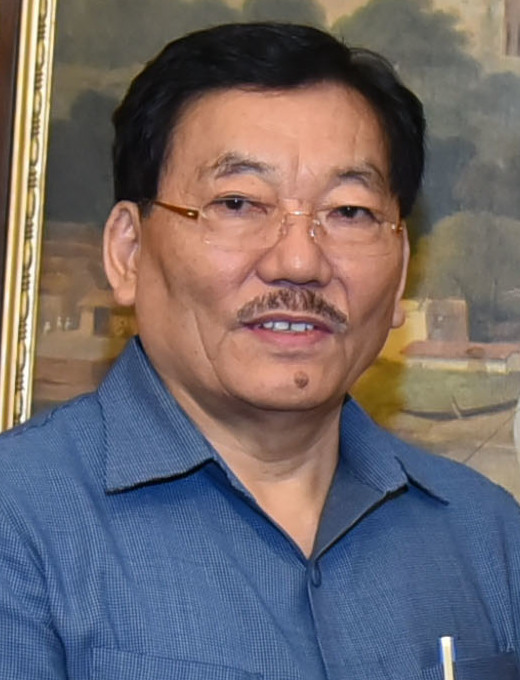

	Majority party	Minority party
Leader	Pawan Kumar Chamling	Nar Bahadur Bhandari
Party	SDF	SSP
Leader's seat	Damthang	Soreng-Chakung
Last election	New	32
Seats won	19	10
Seat change	New	▼22
Popular vote	72,856	60,851
Percentage	42.00%	35.08%
- Constituencies of Sikkim
CM before election
Nar Bahadur Bhandari
SSP
Elected CM
Pawan Kumar Chamling
SDF

Legislative Assembly elections were held in Sikkim, in November 1994, to elect the 32 members of the fifth Legislative Assembly.

== Parties Contested ==
No.	Party	Flag	Symbol	Leader	Seats contested
1.	Sikkim Democratic Front			Pawan Kumar Chamling	32
2.	Sikkim Sangram Parishad			Nar Bahadur Bhandari	31
3.	Indian National Congress			P. V. Narasimha Rao	31
4.	Revolutionary Socialist Party			Manoj Bhattacharya	11
5.	Bharatiya Janata Party			L. K. Advani	3
6.	Communist Party of India (Marxist)			Harkishan Singh Surjeet	2
7.	Independents			collective leadership	76

== Results ==
Party	Votes	%	+/–	Seats	+/–
Sikkim Democratic Front	72,856	42.00	▲42.00	19	Steady
Sikkim Sangram Parishad	60,851	35.08	▼35.33	10	▼22
Indian National Congress	26,045	15.02	▼3.03	2	▲2
Revolutionary Socialist Party	2,906	1.68	▲1.68	0	Steady
Bharatiya Janata Party	274	0.16	▲0.16	0	Steady
Communist Party of India (Marxist)	270	0.16	▲0.16	0	Steady
Independents	10,255	5.91	▲3.18	1	▲1
Total	173,457	100.00	–	32	0
Valid votes	173,457	97.44			
Invalid/blank votes	4,566	2.56			
Total votes	178,023	100.00			
Registered voters/turnout	217,743	81.76			
Source: ECI

=== Results by constituency ===
Winner, runner-up, voter turnout, and victory margin in every constituency
Assembly Constituency		Turnout	Winner				Runner Up				Margin
#k	Names	%	Candidate	Party	Votes	%	Candidate	Party	Votes	%	Margin
1	Yoksam	82.89%	Ashok Kumar Subba	Independent	2,231	39.19%	Sanchaman Subba	INC	2,086	36.64%	145
2	Tashiding	82.04%	Thutop Bhutia	SSP	1,644	35.42%	Rinzing Wangyal Kazi	SDF	1,512	32.57%	132
3	Geyzing	82.56%	Dal Bahadur Gurung	SDF	2,893	50.%	Dal Bahadur Karki	SSP	1,412	24.4%	1,481
4	Dentam	85.53%	Chakra Bahadur Subba	SDF	2,193	40.11%	Padam Lall Gurung	SSP	1,844	33.72%	349
5	Barmiok	83.89%	Tulshi Prasad Pradhan	SDF	2,007	42.58%	Birendra Subba	SSP	1,552	32.92%	455
6	Rinchenpong	78.51%	Phur Tshering Lepcha	SDF	3,181	59.07%	Phurba Sherpa	SSP	1,456	27.04%	1,725
7	Chakung	84.39%	Prem Singh Tamang	SDF	3,372	58.07%	Tika Gurung	SSP	1,766	30.41%	1,606
8	Soreong	83.18%	Nar Bahadur Bhandari	SSP	3,291	50.78%	Man Bahadur Subba	SDF	2,886	44.53%	405
9	Daramdin	84.29%	Ran Bahadur Subba	SDF	3,832	61.04%	Padam Bahadur Gurung	SSP	2,022	32.21%	1,810
10	Jorthang–Nayabazar	83.8%	Bhoj Raj Rai	SDF	4,160	57.59%	Dil Kumari Bhandari	SSP	2,519	34.87%	1,641
11	Ralong	85.93%	Dorjee Dazom Bhutia	SDF	2,017	44.82%	Ugen Tashi Bhutia	SSP	1,135	25.22%	882
12	Wak	82.88%	Kedar Nath Rai	SDF	2,301	51.71%	Bedu Singh Panth	SSP	1,469	33.01%	832
13	Damthang	80.27%	Pawan Kumar Chamling	SDF	3,904	68.95%	Kumar Subba	SSP	1,463	25.84%	2,441
14	Melli	85.13%	Girish Chandra Rai	SDF	3,108	51.28%	Manita Pradhan	SSP	2,153	35.52%	955
15	Rateypani–West Pendam	82.1%	Aita Singh Kami	SDF	3,409	54.22%	Madan Kumar Cintury	SSP	2,186	34.77%	1,223
16	Temi–Tarku	77.26%	Garjaman Gurung	SDF	3,273	55.89%	Indra Bahadur Rai	SSP	2,148	36.68%	1,125
17	Central Pendam–East Pendam	82.04%	Dilli Prasad Kharel	SDF	2,712	34.46%	Sang Dorjee Tamang	SSP	2,530	32.15%	182
18	Rhenock	83.79%	Kharananda Upreti	SSP	2,336	45.4%	Biraj Adhikari	SDF	1,645	31.97%	691
19	Regu	84.43%	Karna Bahadur Chamling	SDF	2,619	48.15%	Krishna Bahadur Rai	SSP	2,435	44.77%	184
20	Pathing	83.58%	Ram Lepcha	SSP	2,625	42.26%	Sonam Dorjee	SDF	1,848	29.75%	777
21	Loosing Pachekhani	83.35%	Dil Bahadur Thapa	SDF	1,497	30.54%	Jai Kumar Bhandari	SSP	1,485	30.3%	12
22	Khamdong	81.82%	Gopal Lamichaney	SDF	3,260	50.69%	Ganju Thatal	SSP	2,164	33.65%	1,096
23	Djongu	83.09%	Sonam Chyoda Lepcha	INC	1,550	39.18%	Sonam Dorjee Lepcha	SSP	1,503	37.99%	47
24	Lachen Mangshila	81.55%	Hishey Lachungpa	SDF	2,316	44.21%	Tseten Lepcha	INC	1,420	27.1%	896
25	Kabi Tingda	81.43%	Thenlay Tshering Bhutia	SDF	1,554	35.81%	T. Lachungpa	INC	1,499	34.54%	55
26	Rakdong Tentek	81.94%	Mingma Tshering Sherpa	SSP	2,835	52.77%	Phuchung Bhutia	INC	880	16.38%	1,955
27	Martam	82.98%	Dorjee Tshering Lepcha	SSP	2,955	48.96%	Samten Tshering Bhutia	SDF	1,647	27.29%	1,308
28	Rumtek	80.33%	Menlom Lepcha	SSP	2,934	42.91%	Karma Tempo Namgyal Gyaltsen	SDF	1,969	28.8%	965
29	Assam–Lingjey	84.76%	Tseten Tashi	SSP	1,574	30.99%	Namgey Bhutia	SDF	1,388	27.33%	186
30	Ranka	81.5%	Rinzing Ongmu	SSP	2,200	36.78%	Tseten Lepcha	SDF	2,182	36.48%	18
31	Gangtok	72.54%	Narendra Kumar Pradhan	SSP	2,798	38.73%	Dilli Prasad Dhungel	INC	2,070	28.65%	728
32	Sangha	54.02%	Namkha Gyaltsen Lama	INC	767	46.01%	Palden Lama	SDF	643	38.57%	124
