= Gyalshing–Barnyak Assembly constituency =

Constituency of the Sikkim legislative assembly in India

Coordinates: 27.250°N 88.238°E

Gyalshing-Barnyak
- Constituency No. 4 for the Sikkim Legislative Assembly

Constituency details
- Country: India
- Region: Northeast India
- State: Sikkim
- District: Gyalshing
- Lok Sabha constituency: Sikkim
- Established: 2008
- Total electors: 12,406
- Reservation: None

Member of Legislative Assembly
- 11th Sikkim Legislative Assembly
- Incumbent Lok Nath Sharma
- Party: SKM
- Alliance: NDA
- Elected year: 2024

Gyalshing Barnyak Assembly constituency is one of the 32 assembly constituencies of Sikkim a north east state of India. Gyalshing Barnyak is part of Sikkim Lok Sabha constituency.

== Members of the Legislative Assembly ==
Election	Member	Party
2009	Man Bahadur Dahal	Sikkim Democratic Front
2014	Sher Bahadur Subedi	Sikkim Democratic Front
2019	Lok Nath Sharma	Sikkim Krantikari Morcha
2024	Lok Nath Sharma	Sikkim Krantikari Morcha

== Election results ==
=== Assembly election 2024 ===
2024 Sikkim Legislative Assembly election: Gyalshing–Barnyak
Party	Candidate	Votes	%	±%
SKM	Lok Nath Sharma	5,612	48.10%	▼8.96
Independent	Khusandra Prasad Sharma	4,649	39.85%	New
SDF	Tika Prasad Sharma	829	7.11%	▼32.30
CAP–Sikkim	Pujan Kharka	317	2.72%	New
BJP	Bharat Kumar Sharma	155	1.33%	▼0.78
NOTA	None of the Above	105	0.90%	▲0.19
Margin of victory		963	8.25%	▼9.40
Turnout		11,667	85.27%	▲2.46
Registered electors		13,683		▲10.29
SKM hold		Swing	▼8.96	

=== Assembly election 2019 ===
2019 Sikkim Legislative Assembly election: Gyalshing–Barnyak
Party	Candidate	Votes	%	±%
SKM	Lok Nath Sharma	5,862	57.06%	▲13.38
SDF	Laxuman Sharma	4,048	39.40%	▼11.45
BJP	Bhanu Bhakta Dahal	217	2.11%	▲0.60
NOTA	None of the Above	73	0.71%	▼0.95
HSP	Sukuhang Subba	73	0.71%	New
Margin of victory		1,814	17.66%	▲10.48
Turnout		10,273	82.81%	▼2.25
Registered electors		12,406		▲18.50
SKM gain from SDF		Swing	▲6.20	

=== Assembly election 2014 ===
2014 Sikkim Legislative Assembly election: Gyalshing–Barnyak
Party	Candidate	Votes	%	±%
SDF	Sher Bahadur Subedi	4,529	50.86%	▼17.27
SKM	Lok Nath Sharma	3,890	43.68%	New
NOTA	None of the Above	148	1.66%	New
BJP	Mandhoj Thapa	135	1.52%	▼2.02
INC	Dal Bahadur Karki	107	1.20%	▼20.15
AITC	Hari Chandra Sharma	96	1.08%	New
Margin of victory		639	7.18%	▼39.59
Turnout		8,905	85.06%	▲0.74
Registered electors		10,469		▲21.07
SDF hold		Swing	▼17.27	

=== Assembly election 2009 ===
2009 Sikkim Legislative Assembly election: Gyalshing–Barnyak
Party	Candidate	Votes	%	±%
SDF	Man Bahadur Dahal	4,967	68.13%	New
INC	Youa Raj Rai	1,557	21.36%	New
SHRP	Laxmi Pd. Tiwari	361	4.95%	New
BJP	Man Dhoj Thapa	258	3.54%	New
Sikkim Gorkha Party	Yam Lall Dangal	148	2.03%	New
Margin of victory		3,410	46.77%	
Turnout		7,291	84.32%	
Registered electors		8,647		
SDF win (new seat)				

== See also ==
- Gyalshing
- Gyalshing district
- List of constituencies of Sikkim Legislative Assembly
