= Yoksam–Tashiding Assembly constituency =

Constituency of the Sikkim legislative assembly in India

Coordinates: 27.291°N 88.282°E

Yoksam–Tashiding
- Constituency No. 1 for the Sikkim Legislative Assembly

Constituency details
- Country: India
- Region: Northeast India
- State: Sikkim
- District: Gyalshing
- Lok Sabha constituency: Sikkim
- Established: 2008
- Total electors: 15,524
- Reservation: BL

Member of Legislative Assembly
- 11th Sikkim Legislative Assembly
- Incumbent Tshering Thendup Bhutia
- Party: SKM
- Alliance: NDA
- Elected year: 2024

Yoksam–Tashiding Assembly constituency is one of the 32 assembly constituencies of Sikkim a north east state of India. Yoksam–Tashiding is part of Sikkim Lok Sabha constituency.

This constituency is reserved for members of the Bhutia-Lepcha community.

== Members of the Legislative Assembly ==
Election	Member	Party
2009	Dawcho Lepcha	Sikkim Democratic Front
2014	Sonam Dadul Bhutia	Sikkim Democratic Front
2019	Sangay Lepcha	Sikkim Krantikari Morcha
2024	Tshering Thendup Bhutia	Sikkim Krantikari Morcha

== Election results ==
=== Assembly Election 2024 ===
2024 Sikkim Legislative Assembly election: Yoksam–Tashiding
Party	Candidate	Votes	%	±%
SKM	Tshering Thendup Bhutia	8,271	60.80%	▲12.28
SDF	Meewang Gyatso Bhutia	3,459	25.43%	▼22.41
CAP–Sikkim	Jigmey Bhutia	1,024	7.53%	New
BJP	Kunzang Sherab Bhutia	318	2.34%	New
INC	Kamal Lepcha	170	1.25%	▲0.08
NOTA	None of the Above	159	1.17%	▲0.04
Independent	Palden Lepcha	109	0.80%	New
Independent	Sonam Palzor Bhutia	94	0.69%	New
Margin of victory		4,812	35.37%	▲34.70
Turnout		13,604	87.63%	▲2.75
Registered electors		15,524		▲12.43
SKM hold		Swing	▲12.28	

=== Assembly election 2019 ===
2019 Sikkim Legislative Assembly election: Yoksam–Tashiding
Party	Candidate	Votes	%	±%
SKM	Sangay Lepcha	5,686	48.52%	▲22.71
SDF	Dichen Wangchuk Bhutia	5,607	47.84%	▼20.49
HSP	Phurkit Lepcha	158	1.35%	New
INC	Pema Rinzing Bhutia	137	1.17%	▼2.49
NOTA	None of the Above	132	1.13%	▼1.08
Margin of victory		79	0.67%	▼41.85
Turnout		11,720	84.88%	▼1.14
Registered electors		13,808		▲19.76
SKM gain from SDF		Swing	▼19.81	

=== Assembly election 2014 ===
2014 Sikkim Legislative Assembly election: Yoksam–Tashiding
Party	Candidate	Votes	%	±%
SDF	Sonam Dadul Bhutia	6,777	68.33%	▼3.42
SKM	Thutop Bhutia	2,559	25.80%	New
INC	Pema Rinzing Bhutia	363	3.66%	▼16.57
NOTA	None of the Above	219	2.21%	New
Margin of victory		4,218	42.53%	▼9.00
Turnout		9,918	86.02%	▼0.92
Registered electors		11,530		▲21.73
SDF hold		Swing	▼3.42	

=== Assembly election 2009 ===
2009 Sikkim Legislative Assembly election: Yoksam–Tashiding
Party	Candidate	Votes	%	±%
SDF	Dawcho Lepcha	5,909	71.75%	New
INC	Aden Tshering Lepcha	1,666	20.23%	New
SHRP	Nedup Tshering Bhutia	430	5.22%	New
Sikkim Gorkha Party	Pemba Sherpa	230	2.79%	New
Margin of victory		4,243	51.52%	
Turnout		8,235	86.94%	
Registered electors		9,472		
SDF win (new seat)				

== See also ==
- Yuksom
- Gyalshing district
- List of constituencies of Sikkim Legislative Assembly
