= Lok Nath Sharma =

Indian politician

Member of Sikkim Legislative Assembly
- Incumbent
- Assumed office May 2019
- Preceded by: Sher Bahadur Subedi
- Constituency: Gyalshing-Barnyak

Minister of Food security, Agriculture, Horticulture & Cash crops, Animal Husbandry, Livestock fisheries & Veterinary services, Information, public relations and Printing
- In office 2019 – 10 June 2024
- Constituency: Gyalshing-Barnyak

Personal details
- Born: Lok Nath Sharma
- Party: Sikkim Krantikari Morcha
- Other political affiliations: Sikkim Democratic Front
- Profession: Police (Resigned) and Social Worker

Lok Nath Sharma is an Indian politician. He was elected to the Sikkim Legislative Assembly from Gyalshing-Barnyak in the 2019 Sikkim Legislative Assembly election as a member of the Sikkim Krantikari Morcha. He is Minister of Food security, Agriculture, Horticulture & Cash crops, Animal Husbandry, Livestock fisheries & Veterinary services, Information, public relations and Printing in P. S. Golay Cabinet.

== Electoral performance ==
| Election | Constituency | Party | Result | Votes % | Opposition Candidate | Opposition Party | Opposition vote % | Ref |
|---|---|---|---|---|---|---|---|---|
| 2019 | Gyalshing–Barnyak | SKM | Won | 57.06% | Laxuman Sharma | SDF | 39.40% | |
| 2014 | Gyalshing–Barnyak | SKM | Lost | 43.68% | Sher Bahadur Subedi | SDF | 50.86% | |
