= Chujachen Assembly constituency =

Legislative Assembly constituency in Sikkim, India

Coordinates: 27.209°N 88.700°E

Chujachen
- Constituency No. 20 for the Sikkim Legislative Assembly

Constituency details
- Country: India
- Region: Northeast India
- State: Sikkim
- District: Pakyong
- Lok Sabha constituency: Sikkim
- Established: 2008
- Total electors: 18,749
- Reservation: None

Member of Legislative Assembly
- 11th Sikkim Legislative Assembly
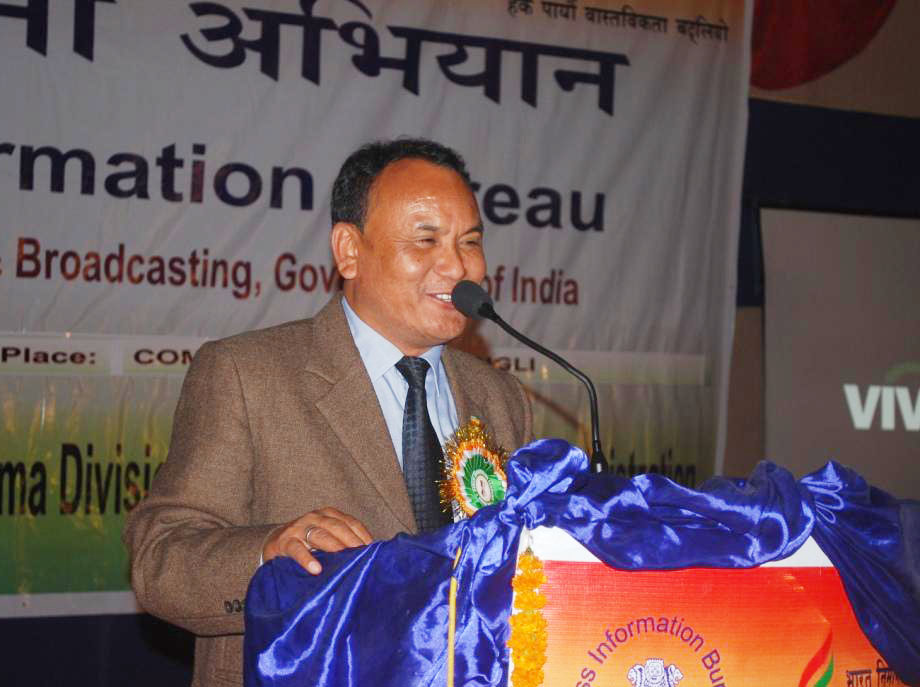
- Incumbent Puran Kumar Gurung
- Party: SKM
- Alliance: NDA
- Elected year: 2024

Chujachen is one of the 32 Legislative Assembly constituencies of Sikkim state, in India. It is part of Pakyong district. It was created after the passing of the Delimitation of Parliamentary and Assembly Constituencies Order, 2008.

== Members of the Legislative Assembly ==
Election	Member	Party
2009	Puran Kumar Gurung	Sikkim Democratic Front
2014	Bikram Pradhan	Sikkim Democratic Front
2019	Krishna Bahadur Rai	Sikkim Democratic Front
2024	Puran Kumar Gurung	Sikkim Krantikari Morcha

== Election results ==
=== Assembly election 2009 ===
2009 Sikkim Legislative Assembly election: Chujachen
Party	Candidate	Votes	%	±%
SDF	Puran Kumar Gurung	8,077	74.35%	New
INC	Harka Raj Gurung	2,114	19.46%	New
BJP	Gajendra Rizal	220	2.03%	New
Independent	Mohan Gurung	155	1.43%	New
Sikkim Gorkha Party	Dhiraj Kumar Rai	76	0.70%	New
SHRP	Gopal Chettri	76	0.70%	New
NCP	Shiva Kumar Pradhan	73	0.67%	New
Independent	Biraj Adhikari	72	0.66%	New
Margin of victory		5,963	54.89%	
Turnout		10,863	83.92%	
Registered electors		12,944		
SDF win (new seat)				

=== Assembly election 2014 ===
2014 Sikkim Legislative Assembly election: Chujachen
Party	Candidate	Votes	%	±%
SDF	Bikram Pradhan	7,836	60.98%	▼13.37
SKM	Kharga Bahadur Gurung	4,425	34.44%	New
BJP	Gajendra Rizal	248	1.93%	▼0.10
NOTA	None of the Above	179	1.39%	New
INC	Rudra Narsing Sakya	162	1.26%	▼18.20
Margin of victory		3,411	26.54%	▼28.35
Turnout		12,850	83.09%	▼0.84
Registered electors		15,466		▲19.48
SDF hold		Swing	▼13.37	

=== Assembly election 2019 ===
2019 Sikkim Legislative Assembly election: Chujachen
Party	Candidate	Votes	%	±%
SDF	Krishna Bahadur Rai	7,266	51.12%	▼9.86
SKM	Damber Kumar Pradhan	5,939	41.79%	▲7.35
BJP	Mohan Gurung	514	3.62%	▲1.69
INC	Gopal Chettri	177	1.25%	▼0.02
SRP	Anil Kumar Rai	107	0.75%	New
NOTA	None of the Above	97	0.68%	▼0.71
Margin of victory		1,327	9.34%	▼17.21
Turnout		14,213	79.96%	▼3.13
Registered electors		17,776		▲14.94
SDF hold		Swing	▼9.86	

=== Assembly election 2024 ===
2024 Sikkim Legislative Assembly election: Chujachen
Party	Candidate	Votes	%	±%
SKM	Puran Kumar Gurung	8,199	55.66%	▲13.87
SDF	Mani Kumar Gurung	4,865	33.03%	▼18.09
CAP–Sikkim	Ganesh Kumar Rai	1,077	7.31%	New
BJP	Duk Nath Nepal	464	3.15%	▼0.47
NOTA	None of the Above	126	0.86%	▲0.18
Margin of victory		3,334	22.63%	▲13.29
Turnout		15,557	82.98%	▲3.02
Registered electors		18,749		▲5.47
SKM win (new seat)				

== See also ==
- List of constituencies of the Sikkim Legislative Assembly
- Pakyong district
