= Bhoj Raj Rai =

Indian politician

- भोज राज राई

Minister of Urban Development of Sikkim
- Incumbent
- Assumed office 11 June 2024
- Governor: Lakshman Acharya
- Chief Minister: Prem Singh Tamang
- Preceded by: Lall Bahadur Das

Minister of Food and Civil Supplies of Sikkim
- Incumbent
- Assumed office 11 June 2024
- Governor: Lakshman Acharya
- Chief Minister: Prem Singh Tamang
- Preceded by: Lall Bahadur Das

Member of Sikkim Legislative Assembly
- Incumbent
- Assumed office 1 June 2024
- Preceded by: Prem Singh Tamang
- Constituency: Poklok-Kamrang
- In office 1994–2004
- Preceded by: Bhim Raj Rai
- Succeeded by: Kedar Nath Rai
- Constituency: Jorthang–Nayabazar

Personal details
- Born: 23 March 1964 (age 62)
- Party: Sikkim Krantikari Morcha, Sikkim Democratic Front
- Spouse: Sharda Rai
- Children: Yash Raj Rai, Abhay Raj Rai

Bhoj Raj Rai is an Indian politician from Sikkim belonging from the Sikkim Krantikari Morcha. He is a member of the Legislative Assembly in the 11th Sikkim Legislative Assembly. He won over SDF's candidate and former Chief Minister of Sikkim Pawan Kumar Chamling with 8037 votes.
