= 1979 Sikkim Legislative Assembly election =

1979 election of the Indian state assembly of Sikkim

← 1974 (country)	12 October 1979	1985 →

32 seats in the Sikkim Legislative Assembly 17 seats needed for a majority
- Registered: 117,157
- Turnout: 65.13%
	Majority party	Minority party	Third party
	SJP		SPC
Leader	Nar Bahadur Bhandari
Party	SJP	SC (R)	SPC
Leader's seat	Soreng-Chakung
Seats won	16	11	4
Popular vote	22,776	14,889	11,400
Percentage	31.49%	20.58%	15.76%
- Constituencies of Sikkim
Chief Minister before election
Kazi Lhendup Dorjee
INC
Elected Chief Minister
Nar Bahadur Bhandari
SJP

Legislative Assembly elections were held in Sikkim on 12 October 1979 to elect the 32 members of the second Legislative Assembly.

== Parties Contested ==
No.	Party	Flag	Symbol	Leader	Seats contested
1.	Sikkim Prajatantra Congress				32
2.	Sikkim Janata Parishad			Nar Bahadur Bhandari	31
3.	Sikkim Congress (Revolutionary)			Ram Chandra Poudyal	27
4.	Janata Party			Chandra Shekhar	30
5.	Indian National Congress			Indira Gandhi	12
6.	Communist Party of India (Marxist)			E. M. S. Namboodiripad	2
7.	Sikkim Scheduled Caste League			Purna Bahadur Khati	2
8.	Independents			collective leadership	108

== Results ==
Party	Votes	%	Seats
Sikkim Janata Parishad	22,776	31.49	16
Sikkim Congress (Revolutionary)	14,889	20.58	11
Sikkim Prajatantra Congress	11,400	15.76	4
Janata Party	9,534	13.18	0
Indian National Congress	1,476	2.04	0
Communist Party of India (Marxist)	241	0.33	0
Sikkim Scheduled Caste League	85	0.12	0
Independents	11,938	16.50	1
Total	72,339	100.00	32
Valid votes	72,339	94.81	
Invalid/blank votes	3,960	5.19	
Total votes	76,299	100.00	
Registered voters/turnout	117,157	65.13	
Source: ECI

=== Results by constituency ===
Winner, runner-up, voter turnout, and victory margin in every constituency
Assembly Constituency		Turnout	Winner				Runner Up				Margin
#k	Names	%	Candidate	Party	Votes	%	Candidate	Party	Votes	%	Margin
1	Yoksam	68.98%	Sanchaman Limboo	SJP	754	29.2%	Ashok Kumar Subba	Independent	556	21.53%	198
2	Tashiding	63.%	Dawgyal Pentso Bhutia	SJP	729	42.61%	Phurba Wangyal Lassopa	JP	502	29.34%	227
3	Geyzing	78.9%	Indra Bahadur Limboo	SJP	811	30.94%	Nanda Kumar Subedi	SC (R)	643	24.53%	168
4	Dentam	72.03%	Padam Lall Gurung	SC (R)	949	40.5%	Pahalman Subba	SJP	379	16.18%	570
5	Barmiok	71.07%	Til Bahadur Limbu	SJP	688	31.15%	Manita Pradhan	SC (R)	419	18.97%	269
6	Rinchenpong	62.63%	Katuk Bhutia	SJP	598	25.97%	Degey Bhutia	JP	480	20.84%	118
7	Chakung	72.41%	Bhim Bahadur Gurung	SC (R)	1,605	63.16%	Kul Man Mukhia	SJP	378	14.88%	1,227
8	Soreong	62.%	Nar Bahadur Bhandari	SJP	1,833	67.39%	Kuldip Gurung	SC (R)	375	13.79%	1,458
9	Daramdin	72.82%	Padam Bahadur Gurung	SJP	1,770	65.29%	Phurba Sangey Sherpa	JP	323	11.91%	1,447
10	Jorthang–Nayabazar	77.31%	Bhim Bahadur Gurung	SC (R)	754	23.18%	Lila Kumar Rai	SJP	693	21.3%	61
11	Ralong	69.29%	Chamla Tshering	SC (R)	438	24.99%	Sonam Pintso Takapa	Independent	371	21.16%	67
12	Wak	59.68%	Garjaman Gurung	SPC	504	30.49%	Durga Prasad Rajalim	SJP	408	24.68%	96
13	Damthang	70.27%	Pradeep Yanzone	SC (R)	661	24.83%	Mani Raj Rai	SJP	622	23.37%	39
14	Melli	77.2%	Mohan Prasad Sharma	SJP	669	25.53%	Sailesh Chandra Pradhan	Independent	528	20.15%	141
15	Rateypani–West Pendam	64.96%	Bir Bahadur Lohar	SC (R)	1,348	50.28%	Isory Majhi	SPC	784	29.24%	564
16	Temi–Tarku	67.54%	Nar Bahadur Khatiwada	SPC	762	35.98%	Harikrishna Sharma	SJP	455	21.48%	307
17	Central Pendam–East Pendam	61.21%	Bhuwani Prasad Kharel	SC (R)	1,346	36.19%	Toga Nidhi Bhandari	SJP	775	20.84%	571
18	Rhenock	70.54%	Kharananda Upreti	SC (R)	504	22.23%	Bhuwani Prasad Dahal	JP	358	15.79%	146
19	Regu	59.94%	Tulshi Sharma	SJP	622	24.83%	Karna Bahadur	Independent	560	22.36%	62
20	Pathing	66.96%	Ram Lepcha	SC (R)	713	28.22%	Chitim Bhutia	SJP	525	20.78%	188
21	Loosing Pachekhani	57.13%	Jagat Bandhu Pradhan	SC (R)	889	42.52%	Bans Bahadur Basnet	SJP	334	15.97%	555
22	Khamdong	79.69%	Dal Bahadur Damai	SPC	879	33.38%	Tilochan	SJP	705	26.78%	174
23	Djongu	68.16%	Athup Lepcha	SJP	865	43.45%	Kazi Lhendup Dorjee Kangsarpa	JP	503	25.26%	362
24	Lachen Mangshila	53.35%	Tenzing Dadul Bhutia	SJP	864	42.5%	Tasha Tengay Lepcha	JP	525	25.82%	339
25	Kabi Tingda	60.91%	Sonam Tshering	SJP	852	48.91%	Kalzang Gyatso	JP	713	40.93%	139
26	Rakdong Tentek	65.7%	Dugo Bhutia	SPC	1,387	55.33%	Loden Tshering Bhutia	SJP	498	19.86%	889
27	Martam	57.03%	Samten Tshering	SJP	731	35.75%	Rapzang Lama	SPC	597	29.19%	134
28	Rumtek	59.06%	Dadul Bhutia	SJP	948	37.19%	Karma Gyampo Bhutia	SPC	602	23.62%	346
29	Assam–Lingjey	58.53%	Sherab Palden	SJP	1,120	61.47%	Phuchung Tshering	SC (R)	405	22.23%	715
30	Ranka	67.24%	Dorjee Tshering Bhutia	SC (R)	679	32.43%	Sonam Tshering Bhutia	SJP	660	31.52%	19
31	Gangtok	56.74%	Lal Bahadur Basnet	SJP	1,707	38.04%	Dorjee Dadul	JP	1,174	26.16%	533
32	Sangha	38.13%	Lhachen Ganchen Rimpuchhi	Independent	733	90.94%	Pema Lama	SPC	45	5.58%	688
