= Sonam Gyatso Lepcha =

Indian politician

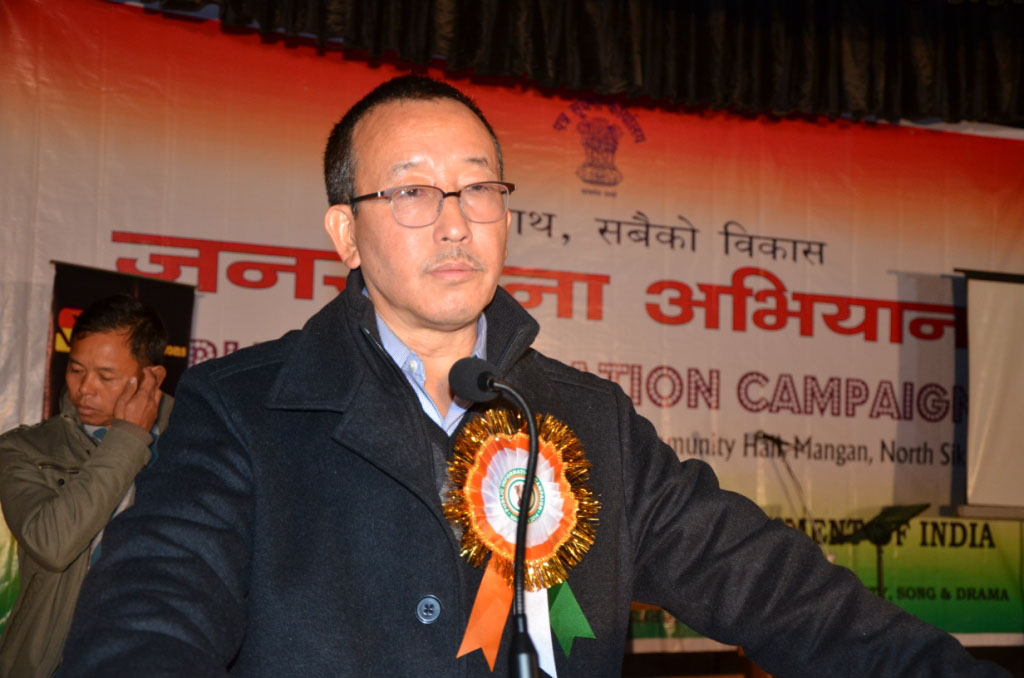
- Public Information Campaign at Mangan on December 2014

Deputy Speaker of Sikkim Legislative Assembly
- In office 27 May 2014 – 1 June 2019
- Preceded by: Man Bahadur Dahal
- Succeeded by: Sangay Lepcha

Member of Sikkim Legislative Assembly
- In office 1999–2019
- Preceded by: Sonam Chyoda Lepcha
- Succeeded by: Pintso Namgyal Lepcha
- Constituency: Djongu

Personal details
- Born: Sonam Gyatso Lepcha
- Party: Sikkim Democratic Front

Sonam Gyatso Lepcha is an Indian politician from Sikkim. He is a member of the Sikkim Democratic Front. He was elected to the Sikkim Legislative Assembly from Djongu in the 2019 Sikkim Legislative Assembly election as a member of the Sikkim Krantikari Morcha. He has won this seat from 1999 but lost in 2024.
