= Thenlay Tshering Bhutia =

Indian politician

Member of Sikkim Legislative Assembly
- Incumbent
- Assumed office 1 June 2024
- Preceded by: Karma Loday Bhutia
- Constituency: Kabi Lungchok
- In office April 2009 – 2014
- Preceded by: Constituency established
- Succeeded by: Ugen Nedup Bhutia
- Constituency: Kabi Lungchok
- In office November 1994 – March 2009
- Preceded by: Hangu Tshering Bhutia
- Succeeded by: Constituency abolished
- Constituency: Kabi Tingda

Personal details
- Party: Sikkim Krantikari Morcha
- Other political affiliations: Sikkim Democratic Front

Thenlay Tshering Bhutia is an Indian politician from Sikkim who is serving as MLA from the Sikkim Krantikari Morcha from Kabi Lungchok for 2024 elections. He was previously in Sikkim Democratic Front party as Area MLA of kabi Tingda before the year 2014 election which he lost to Ugen Nedup of Sikkim Krantikari Morcha. He is currently a member of the Legislative Assembly in the 11th Sikkim Legislative Assembly. He won over SDF candidate Gnawo Chopel Lepcha with 1693 votes.
