= Sikkim Sangram Parishad =

Sikkim Sangram Parishad सिक्किम संग्राम परिषद
- Chairperson: Dil Kumari Bhandari
- Founded: 1984
- Headquarters: Sangram Bhavan, Jewan Theeng Marg, Gangtok, Sikkim
- Ideology: Democratic socialism
- Seats in Lok Sabha: 0 / 543
- Seats in Sikkim Legislative Assembly: 0 / 32

Election symbol

Sikkim Sangram Parishad is a regional political party in the Indian state of Sikkim. In 1979, after a period of instability, a ministry headed by Nar Bahadur Bhandari from Sikkim Janata Parishad party gained power in Sikkim. In 1984, Bhandari dissolved Sikkim Janata Parishad and formed a new party called Sikkim Sangram Parishad. Sikkim Sangram Parishad held on to power in the 1985 and 1989 elections, but after that lost to Sikkim Democratic Front, which has swept the elections since 1999. Sikkim Sangram Parishad did not win any seats in the state assembly in the 2004 elections. Nar Bahadur Bhandari has merged Sikkim Sangram Parishad with the Indian National Congress and he became the president of the Sikkim Pradesh Congress Committee (SPCC).

In 2013, Nar Bahadur Bhandari revived the Sikkim Sangram Parishad again.

This party had won state election two times in 1985 and 1989.

== Electoral records ==
Sikkim Legislative Assembly election

Year	Total Seats	Seats Contested	Seats Won	Forfeited Deposits	% Votes Contested	Source
1985	32	32	30	0	62.20	
1989	32	32	32	0	70.41	
1994	32	31	10	1	35.41	
1999	32	32	7	1	41.88	
2004	32	1	0	1	1.01	

Lok Sabha election, Sikkim

Year	Total Seats	Seats Contested	Seats Won	Forfeited Deposits	% Votes Contested	Source
1985 (by-election)	1	1	1	0	uncontested	
1989	1	1	1	0	68.52	
1991	1	1	1	0	90.12	
1996	1	1	0	0	24.50	
1999	1	1	0	0	42.15	
2004	1	1	0	1	1.46	
