= Gangtok district =

District in Sikkim, India

- District of Sikkim
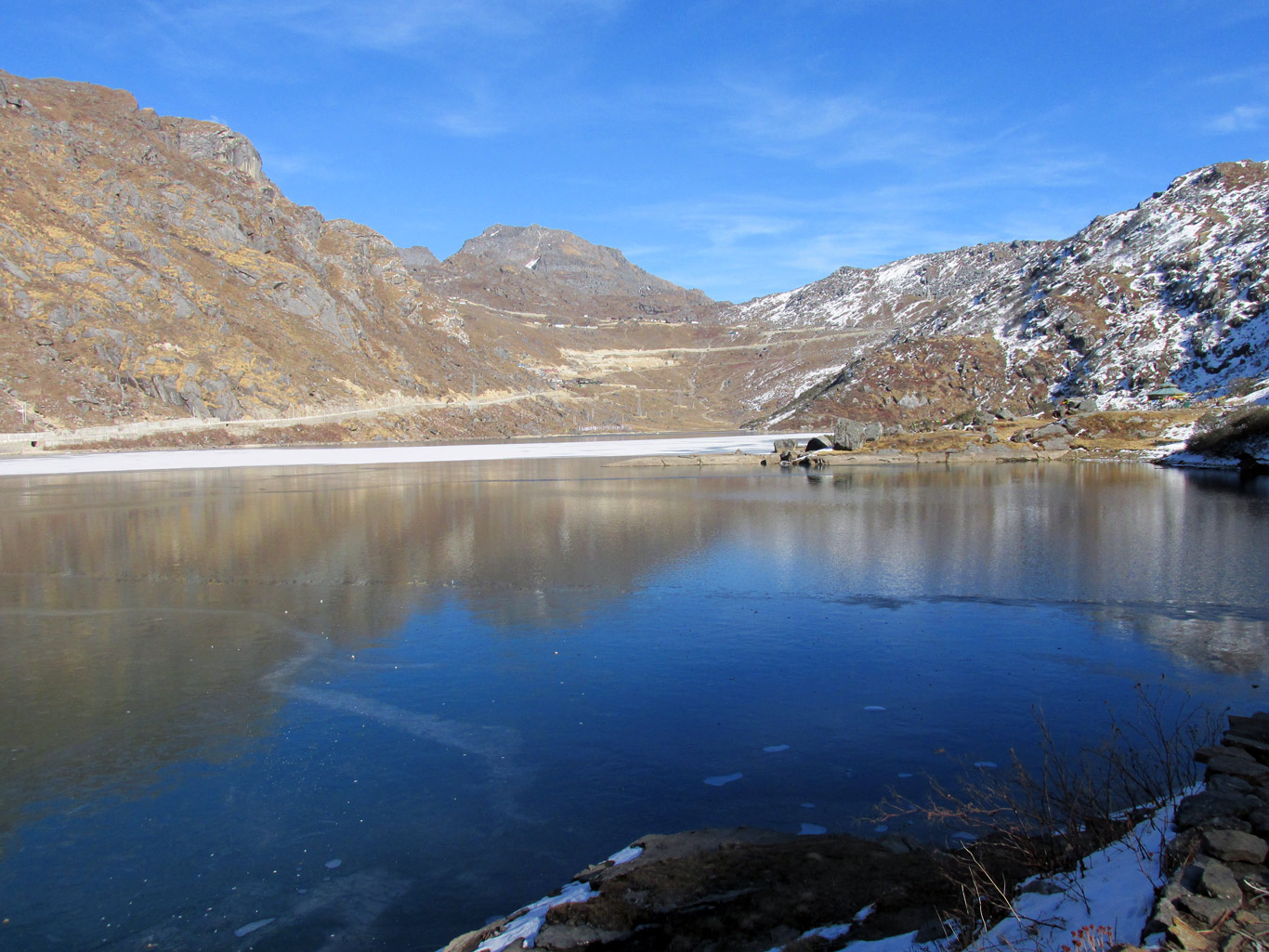
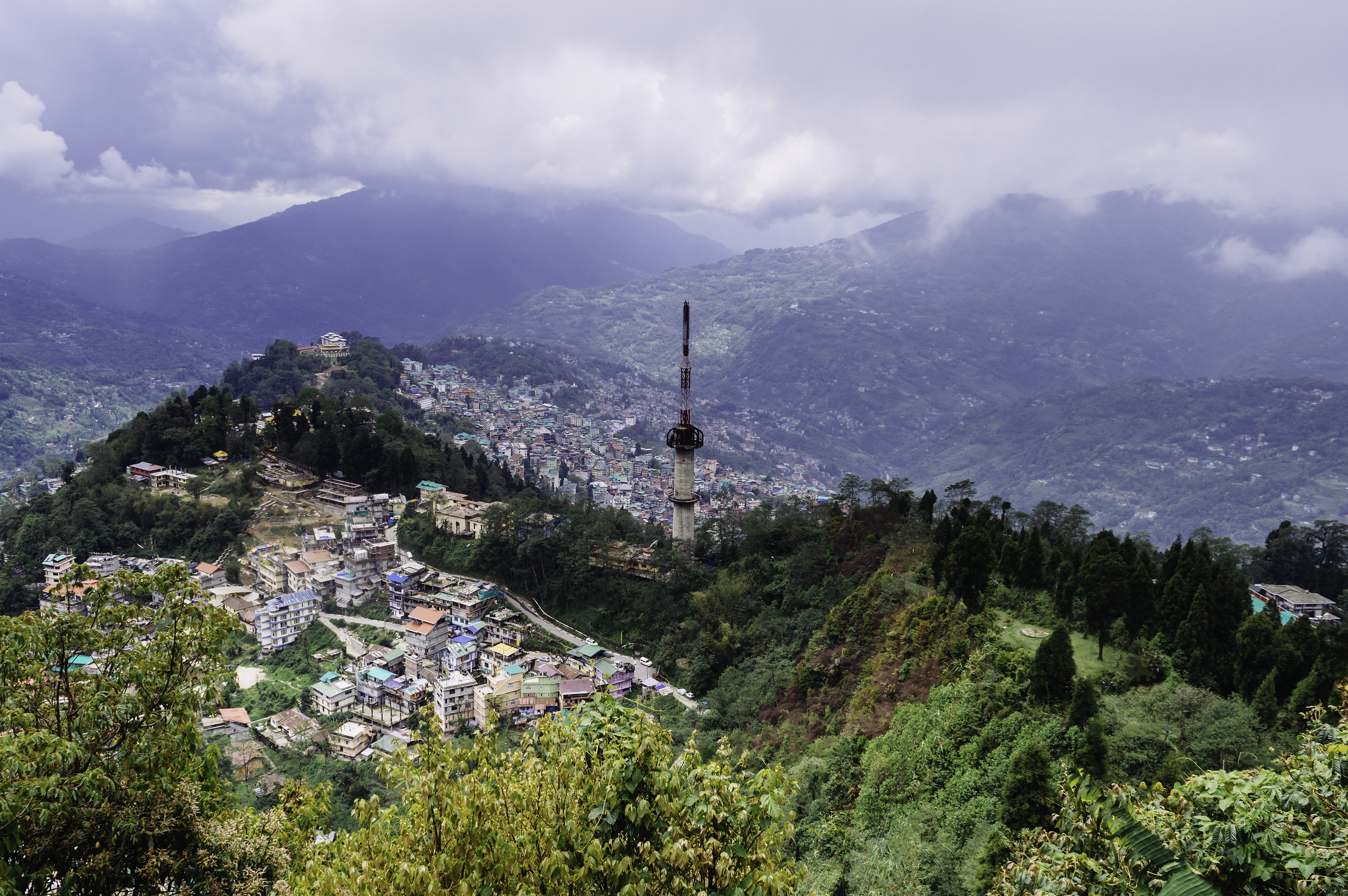
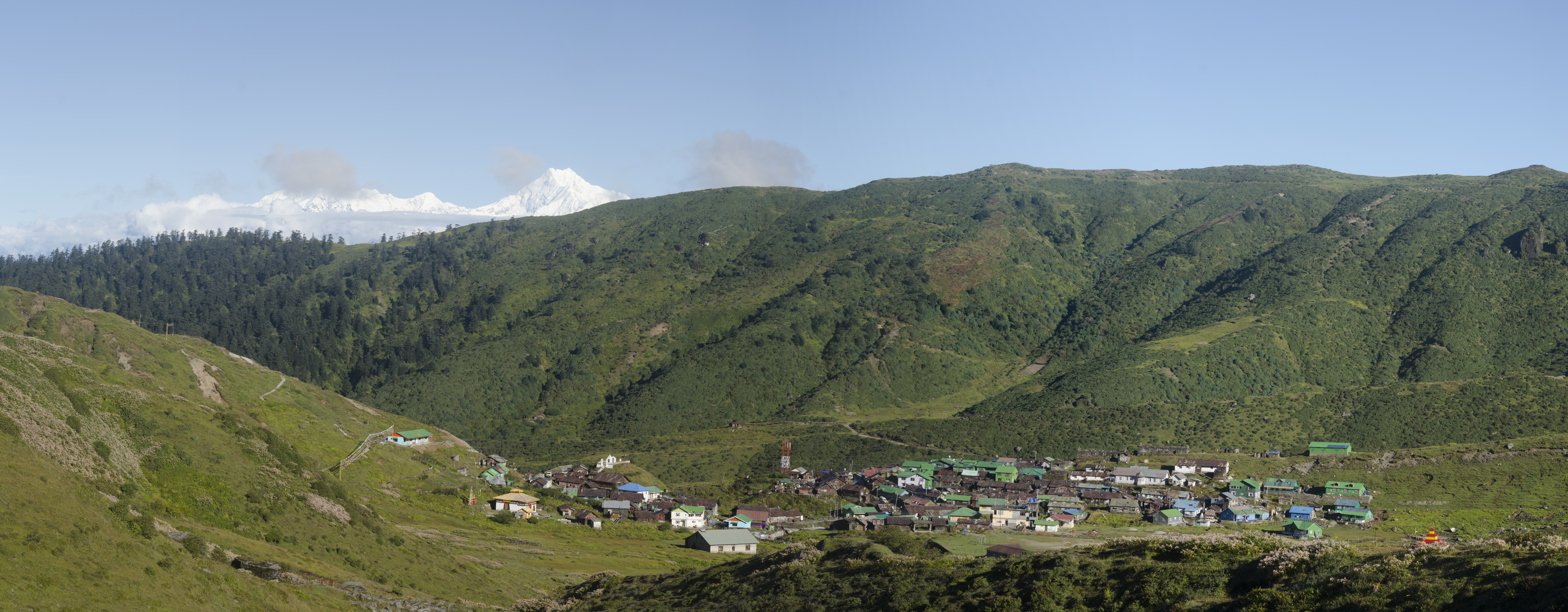
- Changu Lake, view of Gangtok, Nathang Valley, Sikkim
- Interactive map of Gangtok district
- Coordinates: 27°19′N 88°36′E
- Country: India
- State: Sikkim
- Headquarters: Gangtok

Government
  - District magistrate: Tushar Gajanan Nikhare
  - Lok Sabha constituencies: Sikkim Constituency
  - Vidhan Sabha constituencies: Khamdong-Singtam; Shyari; Martam-Rumtek; Upper Tadong; Arithang; Gangtok; Upper Burtuk

Area
  - Total: 964 km^{2} (372 sq mi)
- Elevation: 610 m (2,000 ft)

Population (2011)
  - Total: 283,583
  - Density: 294/km^{2} (762/sq mi)
- Time zone: UTC+05:30 (IST)
- ISO 3166 code: IN-SK
- Vehicle registration: SK-01, SK-08
- Major Highways: NH 717A; NH 10; NH 717B; NH 310; NH 310A
- Largest Stadium: Paljor Stadium, Gangtok
- Website: gangtokdistrict.nic.in

Gangtok district is an administrative district of the Indian state of Sikkim. It was renamed in 2021 as a result of administrative reorganisation of the state, which also saw three subdivisions of the East Sikkim district spawned off as a separate Pakyong district.

The headquarters of the Gangtok district is Gangtok, which is also the state capital. Gangtok is the hub of all administrative activity in the state. The district is bounded by the Pakyong district in the south and southeast, Bhutan in the east, the Tibet in the northeast, Mangan District in the north and Namchi District in the west.

The civilian region is administered by a district collector, appointed by the state government. A major general is assigned to administer military forces in the district. As of 2011 it is the most populous of the six districts of Sikkim.

== History ==
East Sikkim was part of the Kingdom of Sikkim for most of its history. In the 19th century, the district was under the rule of the Bhutanese. After the Anglo Bhutan War, the territory was virtually under the command of the British forces. After India's independence in 1947, the area was part of the Kingdom of Sikkim under the protection of India. During the Sino-Indian War of 1962, the Nathula Pass witnessed a few skirmishes between India and China. In 1975, Sikkim formally became part of the Indian Union as India's 22nd state. The district was under the occupation of the Nepalese for 30 years in the eighteenth and nineteenth centuries.

== Geography ==
View of Kanchenjunga from Gangtok

The district occupies an area of 560 km^{2} (220 sq mi).

The two important Mountain Passes of East Sikkim are Nathula and Jelepla, both passes connects Sikkim with Tibet.

Military-wise, the district is a very sensitive area with the Indian army having control over most areas east of Gangtok and near its borders with Tibet and Bhutan. Visitors to this region are restricted and just a few areas are open to tourists in the areas east of Gangtok.

Popular tourist locales of East Sikkim and Pakyong districts are the Tsongmo Lake, Lake Menmecho, Dzuluk, Baba Mandir, Gnathang Valley, Elephant Lake Kupup, Lungthung View Point, Tukla Valley, Thambi View Point and the Nathu La pass. The pass was first opened during the 1904 Younghusband Expedition to Tibet. It saw a tremendous boom in trade during 1950–1959 when the Chinese troops occupying Tibet were supplied through the pass. The pass and Baba Mandir are open to Indian nationals only. To enter this region a special permit is required; the Inner Line Permit has to be obtained one day prior to departure. This permit is made through local tourist offices. Other tourist areas include the town of Gangtok, the Phodong Monastery north of Gangtok and the Rumtek Monastery.

Other special attractions in the Capital City Gangtok are M G Marg, Hanuman Tok, Ranka Monastery, Himalayan Zoological Park, Palzor Stadium, Tashi View Point, Pakyong Airport view Point. Zuluk And Gnathang Valley are famous attractions in East Sikkim.

== Wildlife sanctuaries ==
Kyongnosla Alpine Sanctuary, and Fambong Lho Wildlife Sanctuary two famous wildlife sanctuaries lies in the East Sikkim district.

== Rivers and lakes ==
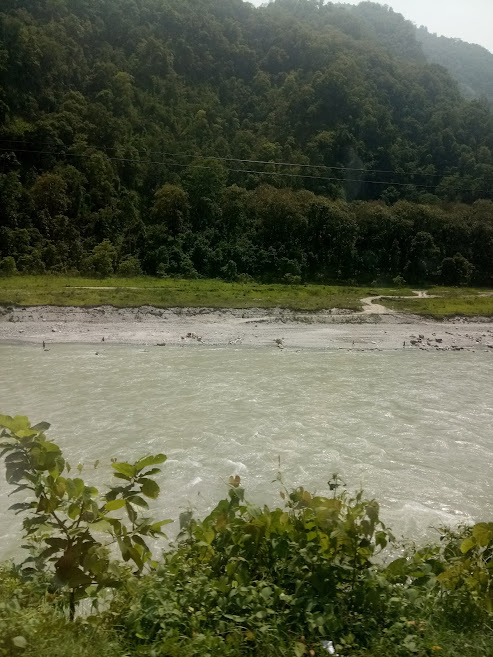
Teesta river near Gangtok

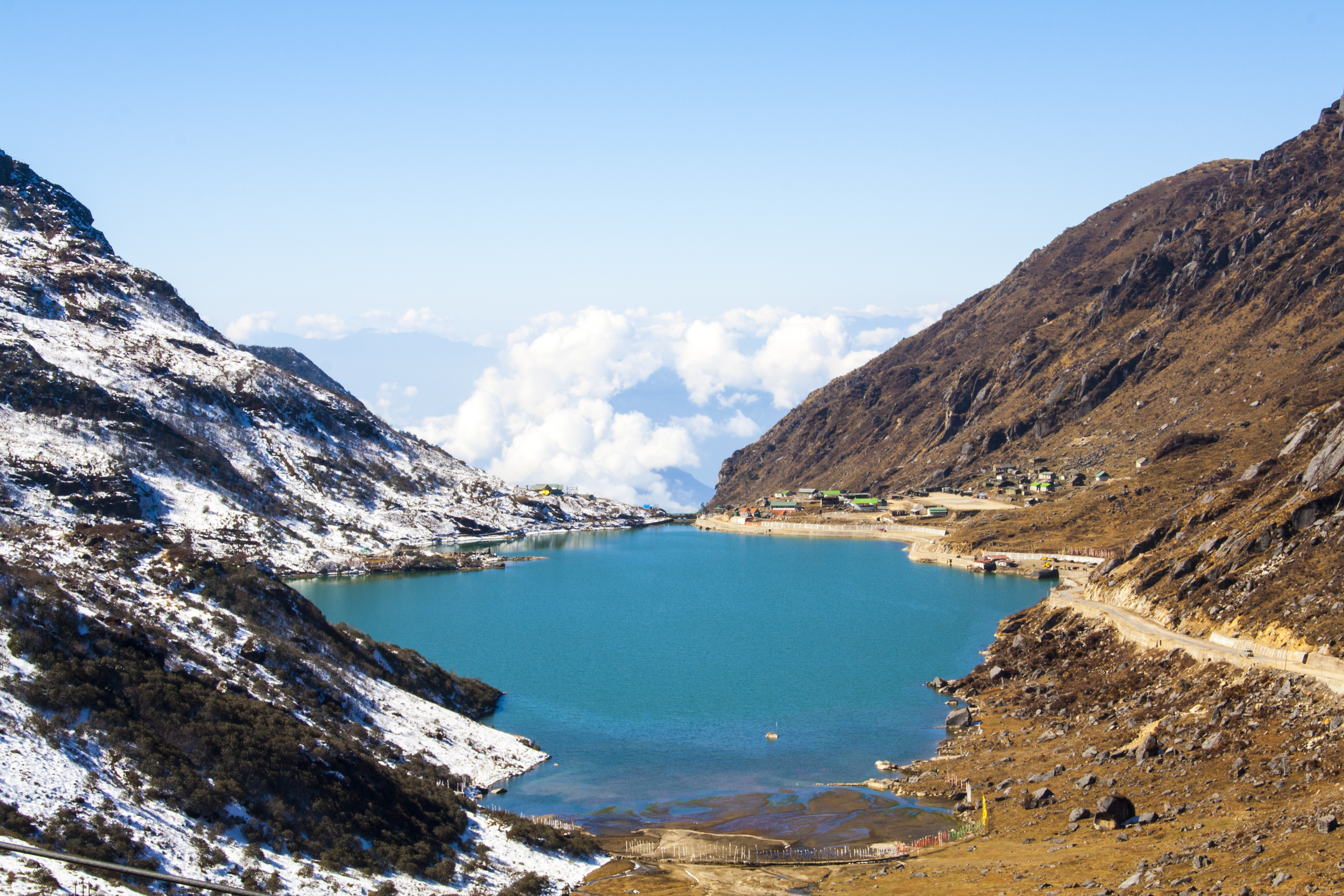
Tsongmo Lake Gangtok District Sikkim

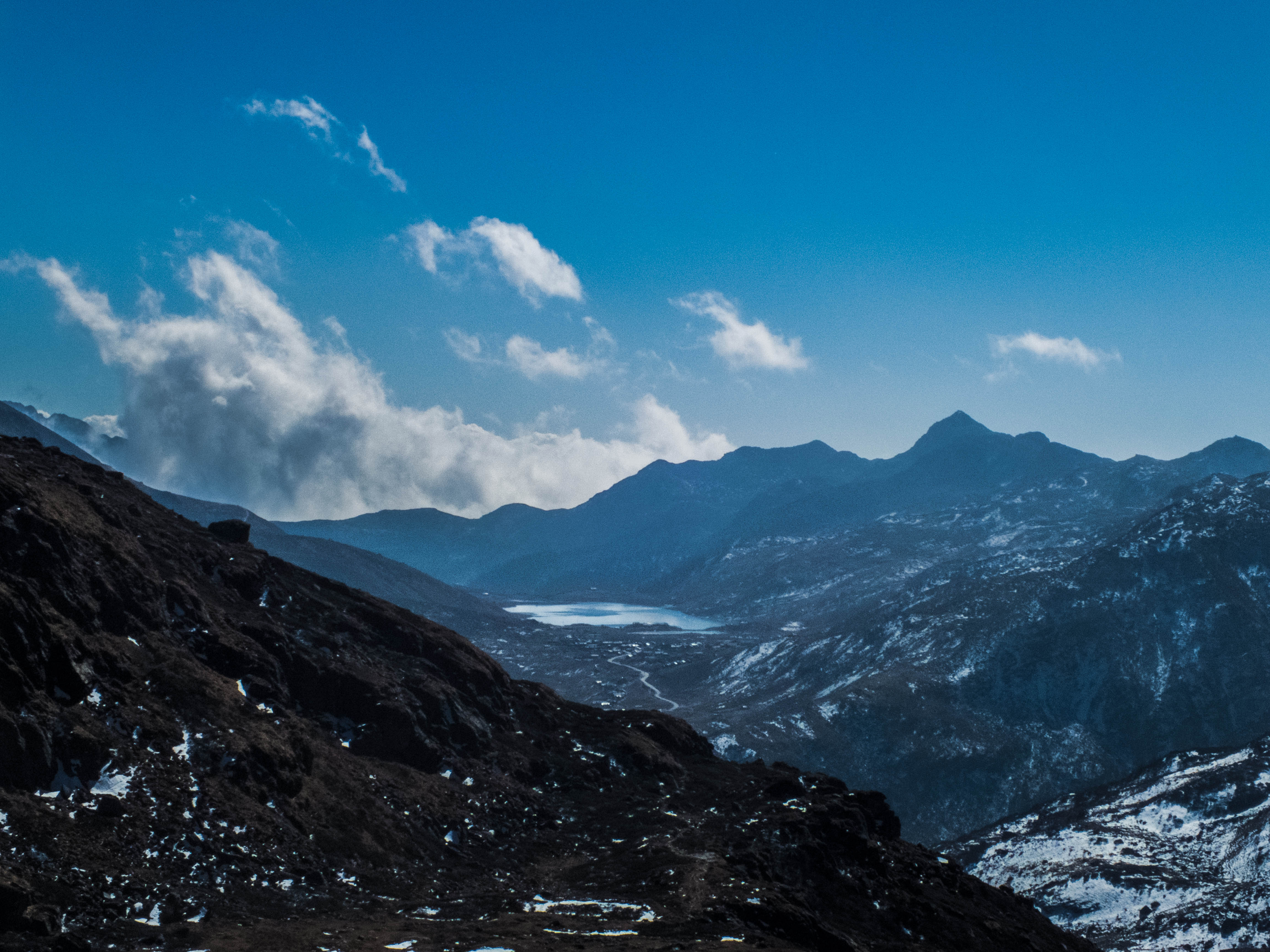
Menmecho Lake Gangtok District Sikkim

=== Rivers ===
River Teesta, the largest river of state flows in East district from Dikchu to Singtam.

River Jaldhaka originates from Kupup and flows south east towards Bhutan, West Bengal and Bangladesh.

Other major rivers of east sikkim are Ranikhola, Ratey River, Roro River, Rangchang Khola etc.

=== Lakes ===
List of important lakes of Gangtok district and Pakyong District are:

- Lake Menmecho
- Lake Tsomgo
- Elephant Lake
- Aritar Lake
- Manju Lake
- Mulkharka Lake
- Nathula Lake
- Gnathang Heart Lake
- Yalk-la Lake. etc.

== Flora and fauna ==
Variety of plants and wildlife are found in the East Sikkim and Pakyong District. The important ones are Red panda the state animal, Blood pheasant, the state bird, Dendrobium nobile the state flower and Rhododendron the state tree are found in the wildlife sanctuaries of East sikkim. Other important wild animals include Snow Leopard, Himalayan black bear, Clouded leopard, Large Indian civet etc. Forest Department, Government of Sikkim has also confirmed the presence of Royal Bengal Tiger in the Pangolakha Wildlife Sanctuary of Pakyong District in January 2019.

== Demographics ==
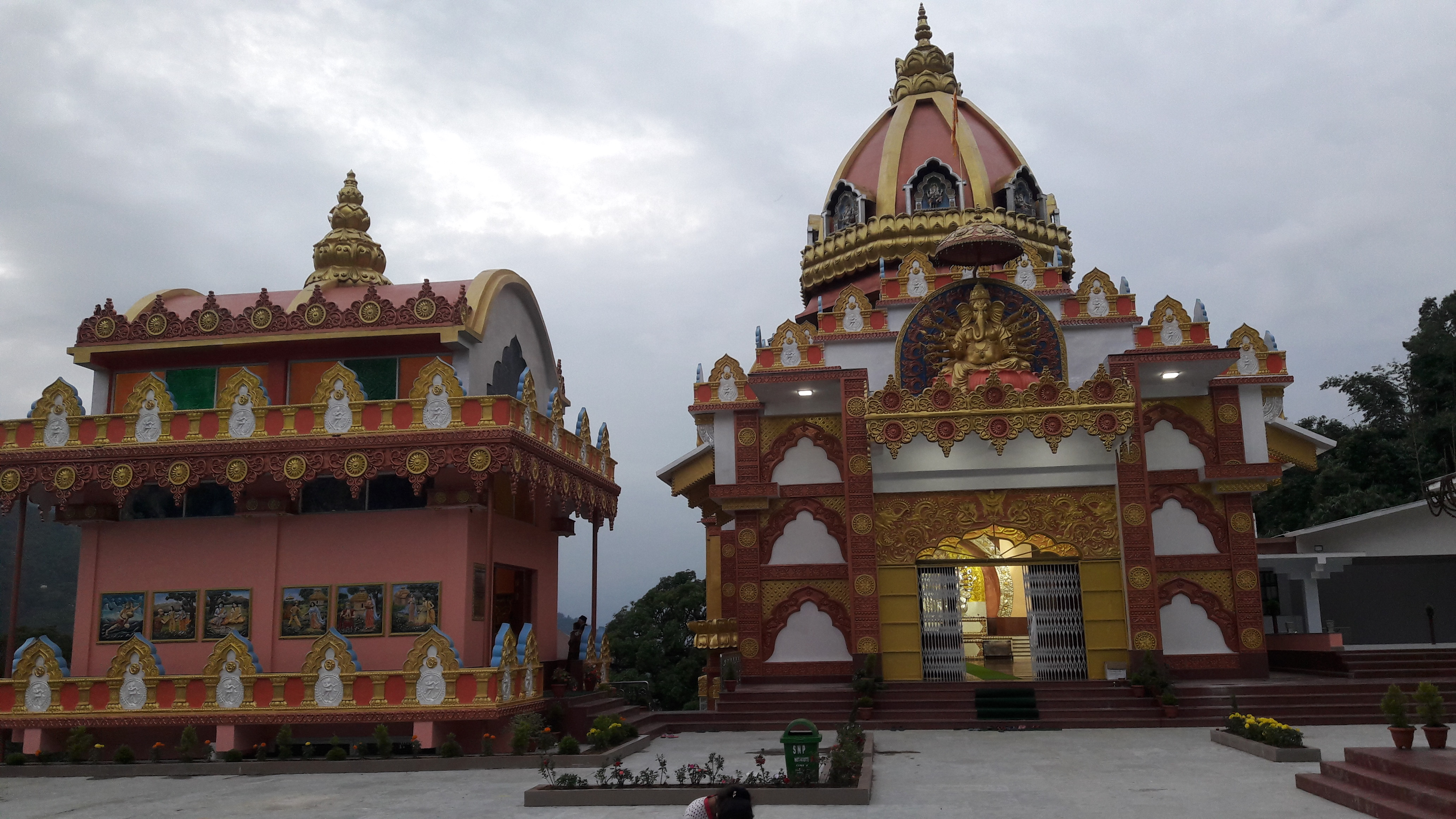
Shri Viswa Vinayaka Mandir temple in Rhenock, Pakyong District

According to the 2011 census East Sikkim district along with Pakyong District has a population of 283,583, roughly equal to the nation of Barbados. This gives it a ranking of 574th in India (out of a total of 640). The district has a population density of 295 inhabitants per square kilometre (760/sq mi) . Its population growth rate over the decade 2001–2011 was 14.79%. East Sikkim has a sex ratio of 872 females for every 1000 males, and a literacy rate of 84.67%.

Religion in Gangtok district (2011)
Hinduism	62.74%
Buddhism	25.55%
Christianity	8.25%
Islam	2.19%
Other or not stated	1.35%

Languages of Gangtok (2011)
1. Nepali (65.6%)
2. Hindi (8.63%)
3. Sikkimese (8.16%)
4. Lepcha (3.41%)
5. Bhojpuri (2.25%)
6. Bengali (1.68%)
7. Limbu (1.55%)
8. Tamang (1.49%)
9. Sherpa (1.14%)
10. Others (6.10%)

Hinduism is followed by majority of the people in the Gangtok district. Buddhism followed by a considerable minority, while Christianity is the third largest religion, 40% of its adherents live in Gangtok. Islam is the fourth-largest religion and is mainly found in migrants in urban centres, mainly Gangtok.

=== Languages ===
At the time of the 2011 census, 65.59% of the population in the district spoke Nepali, 8.63% Hindi, 8.16% Sikkimese, 3.41% Lepcha, 2.25% Bhojpuri, 1.68% Bengali, 1.55% Limbu, 1.49% Tamang, 1.14% Sherpa, 0.75% Rai and 0.51% Tibetan as their first language.

== Assembly constituencies ==
The district is divided into 7 assembly constituencies.

- Khamdong-Singtam
- Shyari (BL)
- Martam-Rumtek (BL)
- Upper Tadong
- Arithang
- Gangtok (BL)
- Upper Burtuk

== Divisions ==
=== Administrative divisions ===
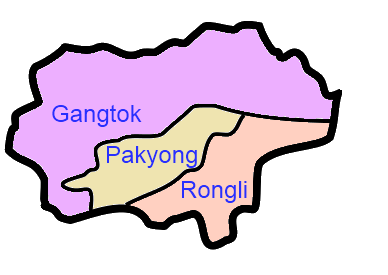
Subdivisions of the East Sikkim district

East Sikkim is divided into three sub-divisions till June 2021. In June 2021, the two subdivisions of Pakyong and Rongli were constituted as Pakyong District:

== Important towns and cities ==
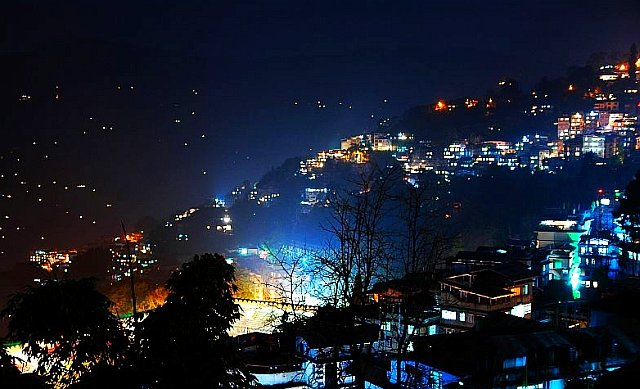
Gangtok at night

The major towns and cities of Gangtok District are

- Gangtok
- Singtam
- Ranipool
- Upper Tadong
- Dikchu
- Sherathang
- Makha

== Transport ==
=== Roadways ===
East Sikkim is connected with wide road network managed by Border Road Organization, National Highways and Infrastructure Development Corporation Limited and State PWD.

East Sikkim has the following National Highways:

- National Highway 10 connecting Siliguri to Gangtok, lies in East Sikkim from Singtam to Gangtok via Ranipool.
- National Highway-717A connecting Bagrakote to Gangtok, lies in the East Sikkim from Ahopul, Ranipool to Gangtok.
- Small portion of National Highway-717B connecting Rhenock and Menla, Sherathang via Zuluk and Rongli lies in East Sikkim. Larger portion lies in Pakyong District.
- National Highway-310 connecting Ranipool and Nathula via Gangtok lies totally on East Sikkim.
- National Highway 310A connecting Gangtok and Mangan lies in East Sikkim from Gangtok to Tingda via Penlong.
- Some portions of National Highway 510 also lies in East Sikkim in Singtam Sherwani area.

=== Airways ===
Pakyong Airport lies on the town of Pakyong in Pakyong District is the nearest airport from East Sikkim. The airport has daily direct flight services from New Delhi, Guwahati and Kolkata.

=== Railway ===
Rangpo Railway Station an under construction railway station of Northeast Frontier Railway zone is the nearest railway station that lies on Rangpo Town of Pakyong District.
