= National Highway 310 (India) =

National Highway in India

National Highway 310
- Map of the National Highway in red
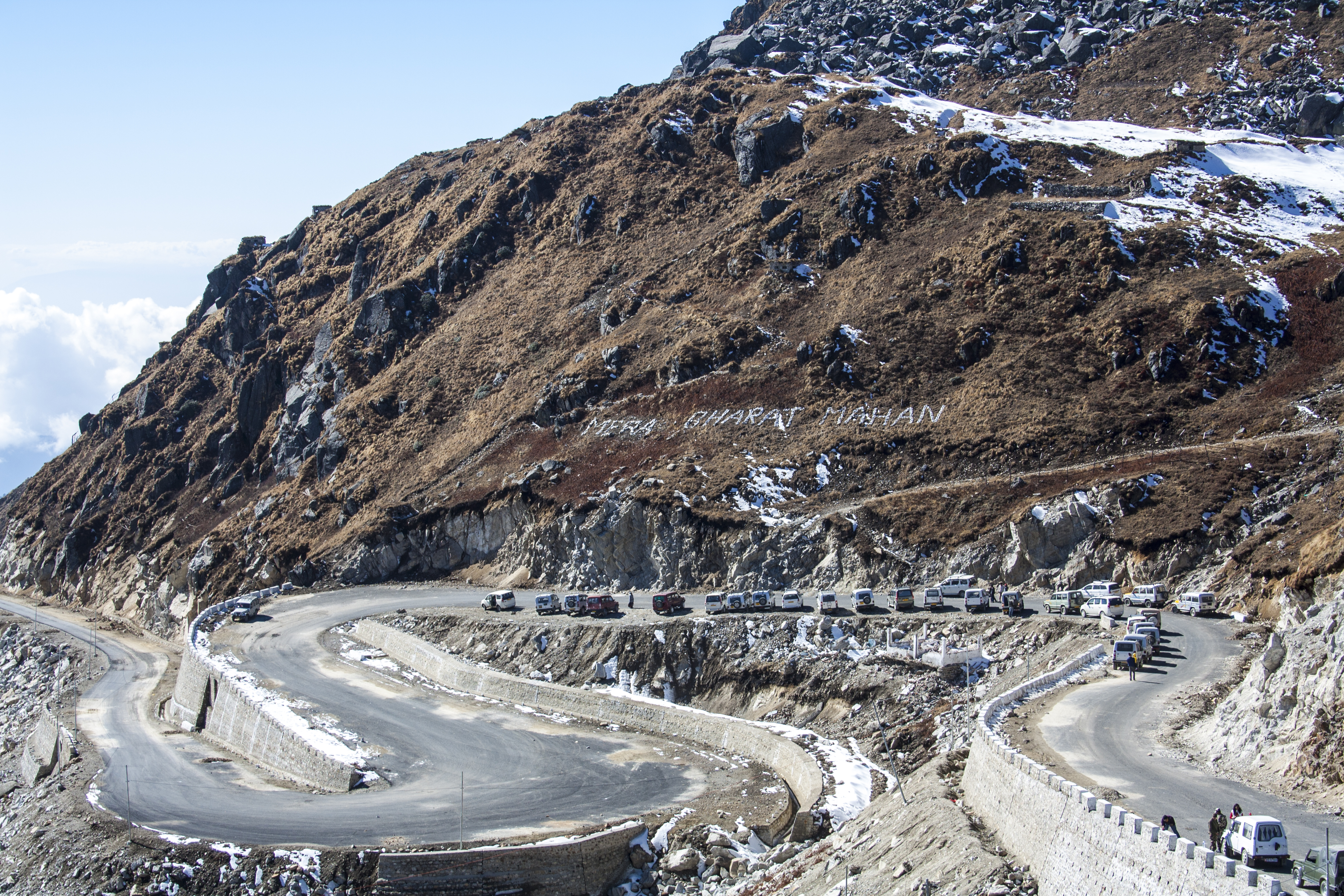
- NH 310 near Nathu La

Route information
- Length: 87 km (54 mi)

Major junctions
- West end: NH 10 in Ranipaul
- NH 310A in Tashi View Point; NH 717B in Sarathang
- East end: G562 in Nathu La at India/China border

Location
- Country: India
- States: Sikkim

Highway system
- Roads in India; Expressways; National; State; Asian
← NH 110	→ NH 310A

National Highway 310, commonly referred to as NH 310 is a national highway in India. It is a spur road of National Highway 10. NH-310 traverses the state of Sikkim in India.

== Route ==
Ranipaul, Burduk, Menla, Changgu, Sherathang, Nathu La.

== See also ==
- List of national highways in India
- List of national highways in India by state
