= NH 10 =

NH 10 may refer to:

- National Highway 10 (India)
  - NH10 (film), a 2015 Indian thriller film
- New Hampshire Route 10, United States
