= Tumen, Sikkim =

Village in India

Tumen/Tumin Tumin
- Village
- Location in Sikkim, India Tumen/Tumin (India)
- Coordinates: 27.3318°N 88.5142°E
- Country: India
- State: Sikkim
- District: East Sikkim

Area
  - Total: 1,070.77 ha (2,645.9 acres)
- Elevation: 1,502 m (4,928 ft)

Population (2011)
  - Total: 2,974
  - Density: 277.7/km^{2} (719.4/sq mi)

Languages
  - Official: Hindi, Nepali, Bhutia, Lepcha, Limbu, Newari, Rai, Gurung, Sherpa, Tamang and Sunwar
- Time zone: UTC+5:30 (IST)
- PIN: 737134
- Telephone code: 03595
- Vehicle registration: SK-01

Tumen, also known as Tumin, is a census village in East Sikkim district, Sikkim, India. The village is located 32 km from Gangtok.

According to the 2011 Census of India, Tumen village has a total population of 2,974 people including 1,522 males and 1,452 females. The literacy rate per the census of the village is 62.10%.

== Tourist attraction ==
The Tumen monastery, built in 1915, is a major tourist attraction in the village.
