= Rhenock =

- Town
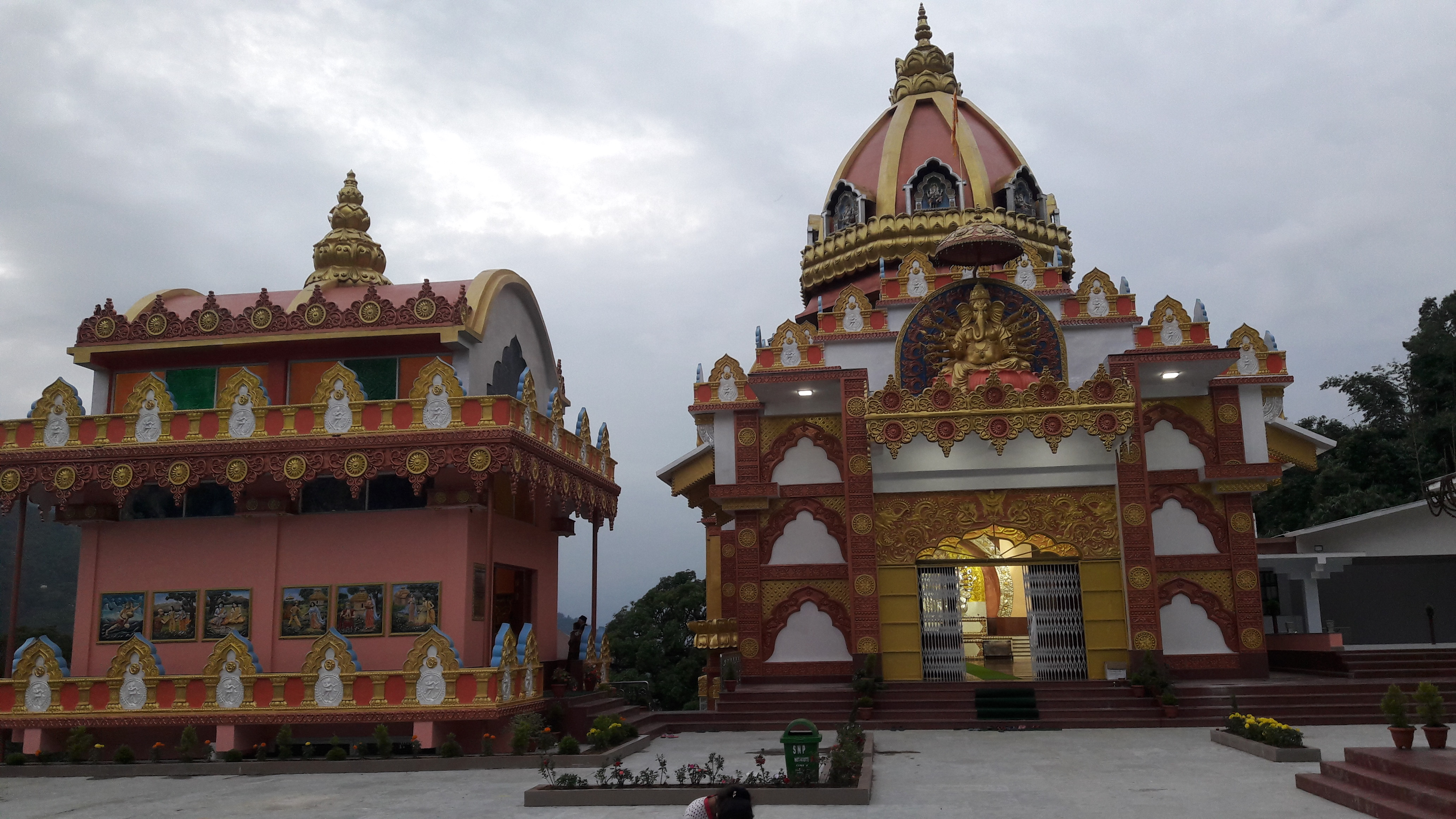
- Viswa Vinayak temple at Rhenock, Pakyong district (Sikkim)

- Location in Sikkim, India Rhenock (India)
- Coordinates: 27.17°N 88.64°E
- Country: India
- State: Sikkim
- District: Pakyong
- Elevation: 1,040 m (3,410 ft)

Languages
  - Official: Sikkimese, Nepali, Lepcha, Limbu, Newari, Rai, Gurung, Mangar, Sherpa, Tamang and Sunwar
- Time zone: UTC+5:30 (IST)
- PIN: 737 133
- Telephone code: 03592
- Vehicle registration: SK
- Lok Sabha: Sikkim Constituency
- Nearest city: Kalimpong
- Vidhan Sabha: Rhenock Constituency
- Website: eastsikkim.nic.in

Rhenock (Nepali pronunciation: [rinak]) is a town, just 29 km from Pakyong City in the Pakyong district in Sikkim, India, located on the border with the Kalimpong district of West Bengal. It lies 63 kilometres east of Gangtok, and 47 kilometres north of Kalimpong on the way to Jelepla Pass at an altitude of 1,040 metres. The Lepcha word Rhe-nock means Black Hill. Situated in the extreme east of Sikkim, Rhenock witnessed the establishment of the first police outpost in the state.

== History ==
Rhenock was covered with dense forest around the 13th century. The Lepchas were the early settlers about five or six hundred years ago. In the mid-16th century the Bhutias, migrated from Tibet settled in the villages presently known as Kyongsa, Aritar, Tarpin, Reshi and Chalisey. The people who settled were Gorkha ethnic groups such as Newars, Bahuns (Adhikari, Poudyal, Gautam, Dahal, Bhandari, Pokhrel and Achaarja), Chhetri (Subedi, Khatiwada & Bista), Gurung, Rai and Limbu. Some people from Northern parts of India also migrated here at around 1940-1960 for business.

== People ==
Rhenock is inhabited by people of different ethnic groups such as Lepchas, Bhutias, Nepalis (Gorkhas), Kiratis, Biharis and Marwaris. Lepcha tribes who were early settlers have their own unique culture. Originally followers of Shamanism, they later became followers of Buddhism. Some of them are followers of Christianity. Bhutias are another group of tribes who are followers of Buddhism and who have their own identity and culture. The majority of the people are Indian Nepalis also known as Gorkha. Most of them are Hindus by religion. Some of the Nepalis Gurung Buddhist; Some others are followers of Christianity. In spite of the above, everyone respects others' beliefs and faiths and celebrates others' festivals which makes a peaceful and prosperous society.

== Demographics ==
=== Religion ===
Religious Demographic in Rhenock Census Town (2011)
1. Hinduism (77.2%)
2. Buddhism (10.8%)
3. Christianity (9.23%)
4. Islam (2.52%)
5. Others (0.22%)

=== Languages ===
Languages spoken in Rhenock Census Town (2011)
1. Nepali (73.6%)
2. Hindi (16.9%)
3. Bhojpuri (4.11%)
4. Bhutia (2.26%)
5. Bengali (1.05%)
6. Limbu (0.54%)
7. Lepcha (0.39%)
8. Sherpa (0.33%)
9. Others (0.82%)

== Transport ==
=== Roadways ===
Rhenock, Charfatak lies on National Highway-717A connecting Bagrakote to Gangtok, via Labha, Algarah etc. National Highway 717B, which is a spur road of National Highway-717A, originates from Charfatak, Rhenock and ends in Menla, Sherathang via Zuluk and Rongli.

The town is well connected to many parts of Sikkim and its neighbouring state of West Bengal. Direct Taxi services access Gangtok, Pakyong, Kalimpong, Pedong, Algarah, Labha, Rongli, Rangpo, Singtam, Ranipool, Rorathang, Panitanki, and Siliguri.

As Rhenock lies close to the border between Sikkim and Kalimpong district of North Bengal, so it is also an important town for the villages of Kalimpong district like Lingsay, Chuba, Beech Kagay, Gendung, Bendha, Pavak, Kataray, Jhusing, Jogi Bhir, Mudung, Pithamchin, Mulkharka, Fusrey, Tagathan, Kashing, Lunchu, Khimsithang, Ladam, Deorali Kagey, Hatticharay, Dabaipani etc. Hence daily taxi services access these villages with Rhenock.

Buses:

SNT buses are available from the town. The Bus service connecting Rongli to Sikkim Nationalised Transport Bus Terminus (Siliguri) runs from Rhenock via Rorathang, Rangpo, Sevoke etc. Also SNT bus connecting Rhenock to Gangtok via Pakyong originates from the town.

=== Airways ===
Pakyong Airport is 31 kilometres away from Rhenock. Bagdogra International Airport is 111 Kilometres away.

=== Railway ===
The nearest Railway Stations are

- Sevoke Junction - 79 Kilometres via NH10.
- Malbazar Junction - 81 Kilometres via NH-717A.
- Siliguri Junction - 99 Kilometres via NH10.
- New Jalpaiguri Junction - 104 Kilometres via NH10.
- Rangpo railway station an under construction railway station which is 26 kilometres away from Rhenock.

== Educational institutions ==
Rhenock has about 130 years of history of education. Rhenock School is among the oldest schools of Sikkim. It was established by a Christian missionary in 1880 at Rhenock (Khamdong). Later it was taken over by the government of Sikkim and shifted to Kingstone. Presently the school is known as Senior Secondary School, Rhenock. A Sanskrit Pathshala (School) was run in the premises of Rhenock Temple to teach Sanskrit and rituals to train Hindu priests. After the merger of Sikkim into the Indian union more than a dozen schools were opened by the government of Sikkim. Rhenock now has the following educational institutions:

- Government Degree College
- Government Senior Secondary School, Rhenock
- Government Secondary School, Tarpin
- Government Secondary School, Sudunglakha
- Government Secondary School, Aritar
- St. Joseph's School, Rhenock
- Sanskrit School at Khamdong & Rhenock Bazar
- Others: Junior high schools and many primary schools

== Places of interest ==
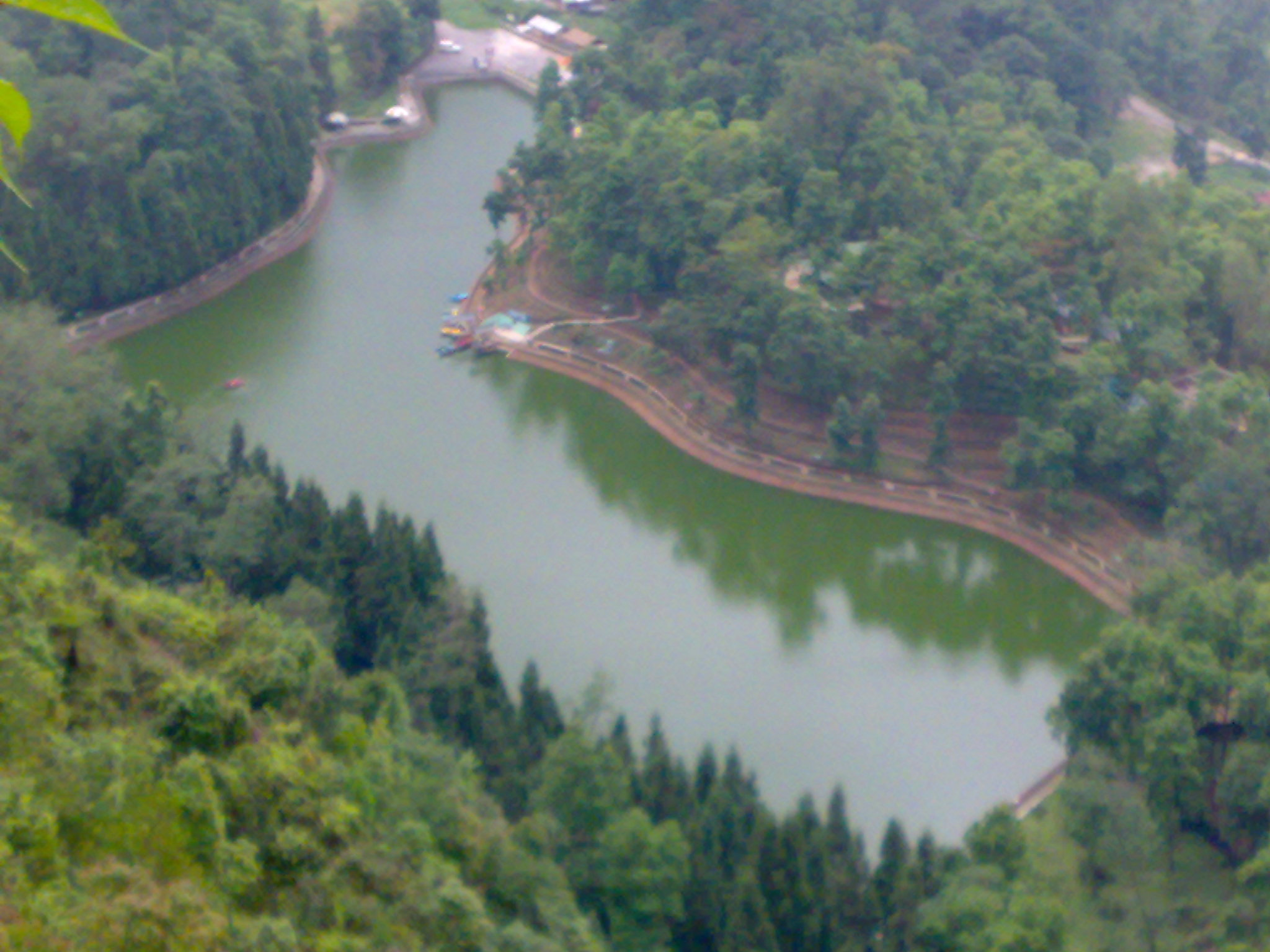
Aritar Lake, Rhenock, East Sikkim

- Shivalaya, Rhenock
- Shri Viswa Vinayaka Mandir Rhenock
- Aritar Lake
- Wood Land Nursery
- Aritar Gumpa (monastery)
- Lonely falls (Kali Khola)
- Reshi Eco Tourism
- Ramgauri Sangralaya (Museum carrying the history of Sikkim)

Pangulakha Wild Life Sanctuary (covered from Chandney to Bhutan border) Lampokhari Lake, Mangkhim, Hattey pahile. Darpaney in Mulukey East Sikkim

== Bibliography ==
- Mullard, Saul (2011), Opening the Hidden Land: State Formation and the Construction of Sikkimese History, BRILL, ISBN 978-90-04-20895-7
