= Kyongnosla Alpine Sanctuary =

Nature reserve in India

- IUCN category IV (habitat/species management area)
- Location within Sikkim Location within India
- Interactive map of Kyongnosla Alpine Sanctuary
- Location: Gangtok district, India
- Nearest city: Gangtok
- Coordinates: 27°22′37″N 88°44′28″E
- Area: 31 km^{2} (12 mi^{2})
- Established: 1977

Kyongnosla Alpine Sanctuary is a nature reserve in Gangtok district, Sikkim, India. It is situated around the area adjoining Lake Tsomgo and covers an area of about 31 km^{2} (12 sq mi). It harbours orchids and rhododendrons interspersed among tall junipers and taller silver firs.

Kyongnosla Alpine Sanctuary is part of the Sacred Himalayan Landscape.
