= Rongli =

- Town
- Location in Sikkim, India
- Coordinates: 27.2037°N 88.7015°E
- Country: India
- State: Sikkim
- District: Pakyong
- Elevation: 1,585 m (5,200 ft)

Language
  - Official: Nepali (Gorkha), Lepcha, Limbu, Newari, Rai, Gurung, Mangar, Sherpa, Tamang, Bhutia, and Sunwar
- Time zone: UTC+5:30 (IST)
- PIN: 737131
- Vehicle registration: SK
- Climate: Cwb
- Lok Sabha: Sikkim Constituency
- Nearest cities: Kalimpong - 58 Km, Gangtok - 62 Km; Pakyong - 22 Km
- Vidhan Sabha: Chujachen Constituency
- Website: eastsikkim.nic.in

Rongli is a town, in the Pakyong district of the Indian state of Sikkim. It lies on the banks of Rangpo River around 22 kilometres (14 mi) from Pakyong city, the district headquarters, and around 69 kilometres (43 mi) by road south of the state capital Gangtok. Rongli is also the headquarter of Rongli Subdivision of Pakyong district. Rongli is one of the oldest market of Sikkim that lies on the trade route between Kalimpong and Tibet.

== Demographics ==
As of the 2011 Census of India, Rangli had 6,054 households with a total population of 27,741. Males made up 14,408 of this figure and females 13,333 while 2,966 individuals were under six years of age.

== Transport ==
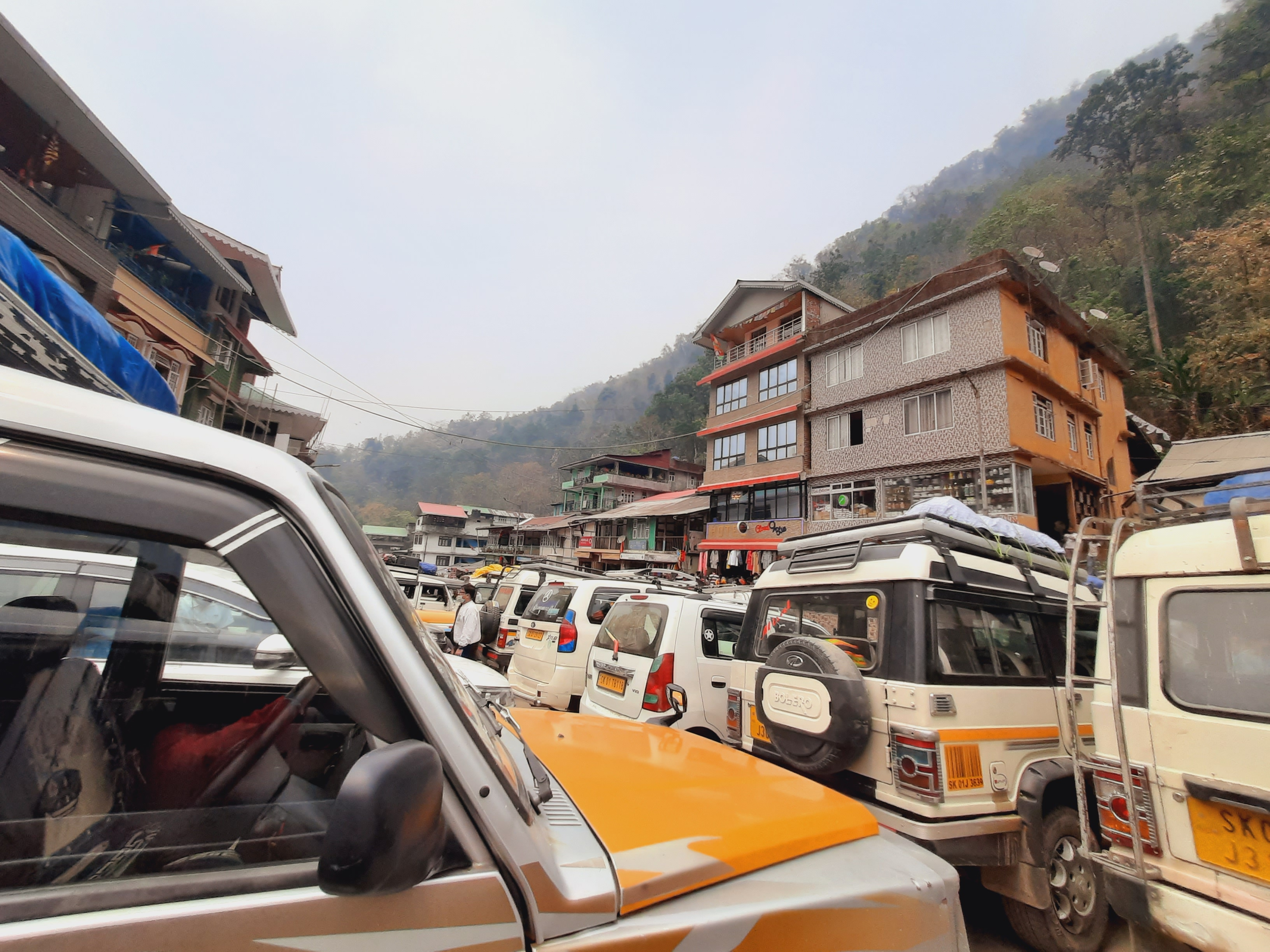
A taxi stand in Rongli Bazar

=== Roadways ===
Rongli lies on the National Highway 717B which connects Rhenock and Menla, Sherathang via Zuluk.

The town is well connected to many parts of East Sikkim and its neighbouring state West Bengal. Direct Taxi services access Gangtok, Pakyong, Kalimpong, Rhenock, Pedong, Algarah, Singtam, Rangpo, Rorathang, Ranipool, Sherathang, Panitanki and Siliguri.

Buses:

Sikkim Nationalized Transport (SNT) bus service originates from Rongli and terminates in Sikkim Nationalised Transport Bus Terminus (Siliguri) via Rorathang, Rangpo, Melli, Sevoke etc. Another SNT bus service originates from the town and connects Gangtok via Rorathang, Pakyong and Ranipool.

=== Airways ===
The nearest airport is Pakyong Airport 24 kilometres away. Bagdogra International Airport is 110 kilometres away.

=== Railways ===
The nearest railway stations are:

- Sevoke Junction 79 kilometres.
- Malbazar Junction 97 kilometres.
- Siliguri Junction 98 kilometres.
- New Jalpaiguri 104 kilometres.

Rangpo railway station is an under construction station 24 kilometres away from the town.

== Geography ==
The town is located at 27.2037°N 88.7015°E in Pakyong District that lies on the bank of Rangpo River making the town and nearby areas as a good agriculture area with abundance of water. Lying in East Sikkim on the road connecting Rangpo to Nathula, the town is also very close to the border between Sikkim and Bhutan and Sikkim and China.

The villages surrounding the town are Mulukay, Sudunglakha, Soureni, Dalapchand, Chujachen, Rolep, Rhegoh, Phadamchen, Dzuluk, Lamaten, Lingtam, Subaneydara, Kupup, Gnathang, Lhosing, etc.

== Rivers ==
Two major rivers River Rangpo and River Jaldhaka originates from lakes of Rongli Subdivision.

River Rangpo flows through Pakyong District towards Pakyong Sub Division villages, Rorathang town and joins river Teesta at Rangpo Town . Rongli Khola and River Rangpo meets at Rongli.

River Jaldhaka on the other hand flows towards Bhutan and comes back to India again at Kalimpong district and flows through Jalpaiguri district and Cooch Behar district of West Bengal before entering Bangladesh where it meets river Brahmaputra at Kurigram District.So at total this river flows through Three Countries.

== Climate ==
It has a humid subtropical type of climate ranging from 2 °C in winter to 30 °C in summer. It is normally dry in winter but rainfall occurs all year round. Monsoon season starts during the second week of June till September which is characterised by heavy rainfall, landslides and dense fog can disrupt travel during this days. Average rainfall in a year ranges from 2800mm- 3000mm. Best time to visit here is during spring and autumn season when plenty of sunshine is available making it a pleasurable day but Violent afternoon thunderstorms are common during afternoon hours in pre-monsoon (spring) and post-monsoon (autumn) season with strong surface winds, hailstorms and heavy rainfall it is always advisable to look at weather forecast before planning such trips.

== See also ==
- Pangolakha Wildlife Sanctuary
- Pakyong Subdivision
