= Ramgauri Sangralaya =

Ram Gauri Sangrahalaya
- Location of Rhenock in India
- Location: Rhenock - Pakyong District, Sikkim, India
- Coordinates: 27.176622°N 88.6432°E
- Type: Museum
- Owner: Ganesh Kumar Pradhan

Ram Gauri Sangralaya is a museum in Rhenock Bazar near Thakurbari Mandir (temple), in the administrative district of Pakyong District in the Indian state of Sikkim. Sangralaya is home of the Sikkim Herald, the first government newspaper of Sikkim, which also collects stamps, coins, and newspapers. The Museum documents the political history of Sikkim.

== Collection ==
The Museum has a large volume of documents related to the political development of the former Himalayan Kingdom of Sikkim. It has a collection of various tax receipts paid by the Sikkimese peasantry to their feudal lords in the pre-merger period, banks receipt issued by Bhojraj and Jethmul Bank (the first bank of Sikkim), the entire volume of Kanchenjunga (the first news-based journal of Sikkim) various antiques like telegram machines, gramophones, antique locks and keys, utensils, radios, and clocks.
