= Hanuman Tok =

Hindu temple in India

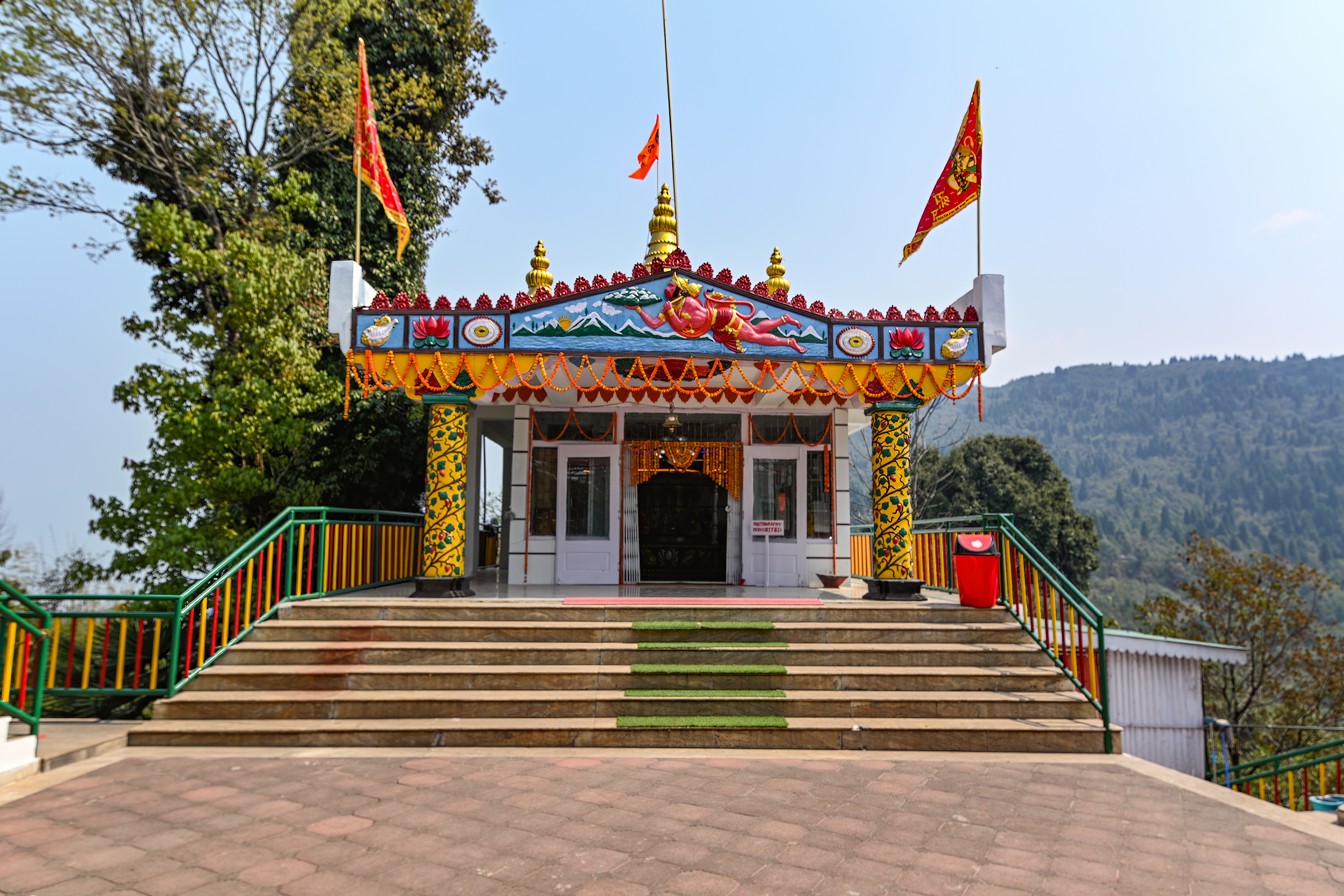
- View of Gangtok from Hanuman Tok

- Location in Sikkim

Religion
- Affiliation: Hinduism
- District: Gangtok
- Deity: Hanuman

Location
- Location: About 11 km far from Gangtok
- State: Sikkim
- Country: India
- Interactive map of Hanuman Tok
- Coordinates: 27°20′52″N 88°37′43″E

Architecture
- Completed: 1952
- Elevation: 2,194.56 m (7,200 ft)

Hanuman Tok is a Hindu temple complex which is located in the upper reaches of Gangtok, the capital of the Indian state of Sikkim. The temple is dedicated to lord Hanuman, and maintained by the Indian army. In 1950, a bureaucrat, Appaji Pant, built the temple over the stone. Later the Indian Army acquired the land around Hanuman Tok and inherited the temple along with it.

== Legends ==
According to the local legends, when Hanuman was flying to Dunagiri (mountain) which had the life saving herb Sanjeevani to save Lord Rama's brother Lakshmana, he rested in the spot for some time where his temple now lies.

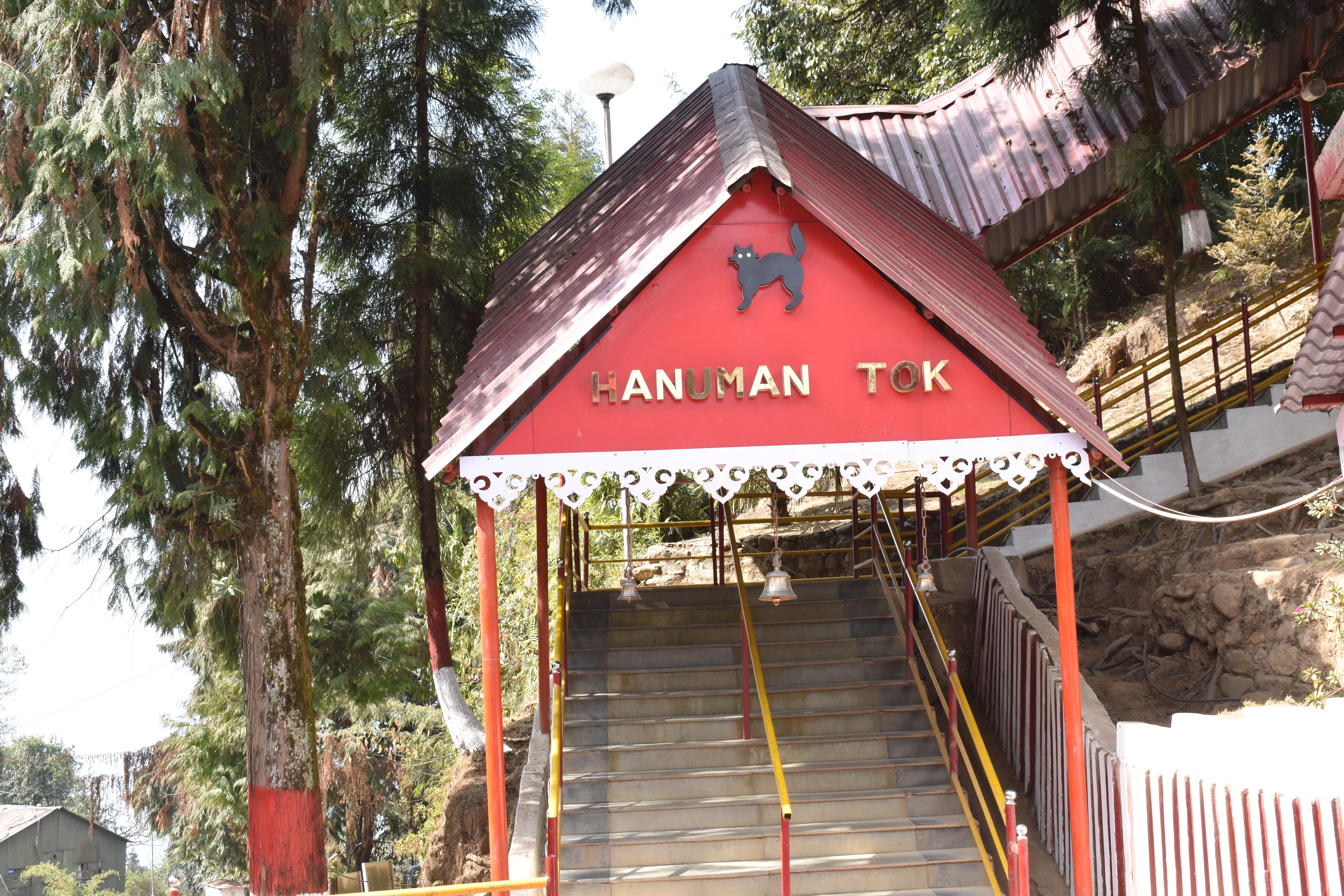
Entrance of Hanuman Tok

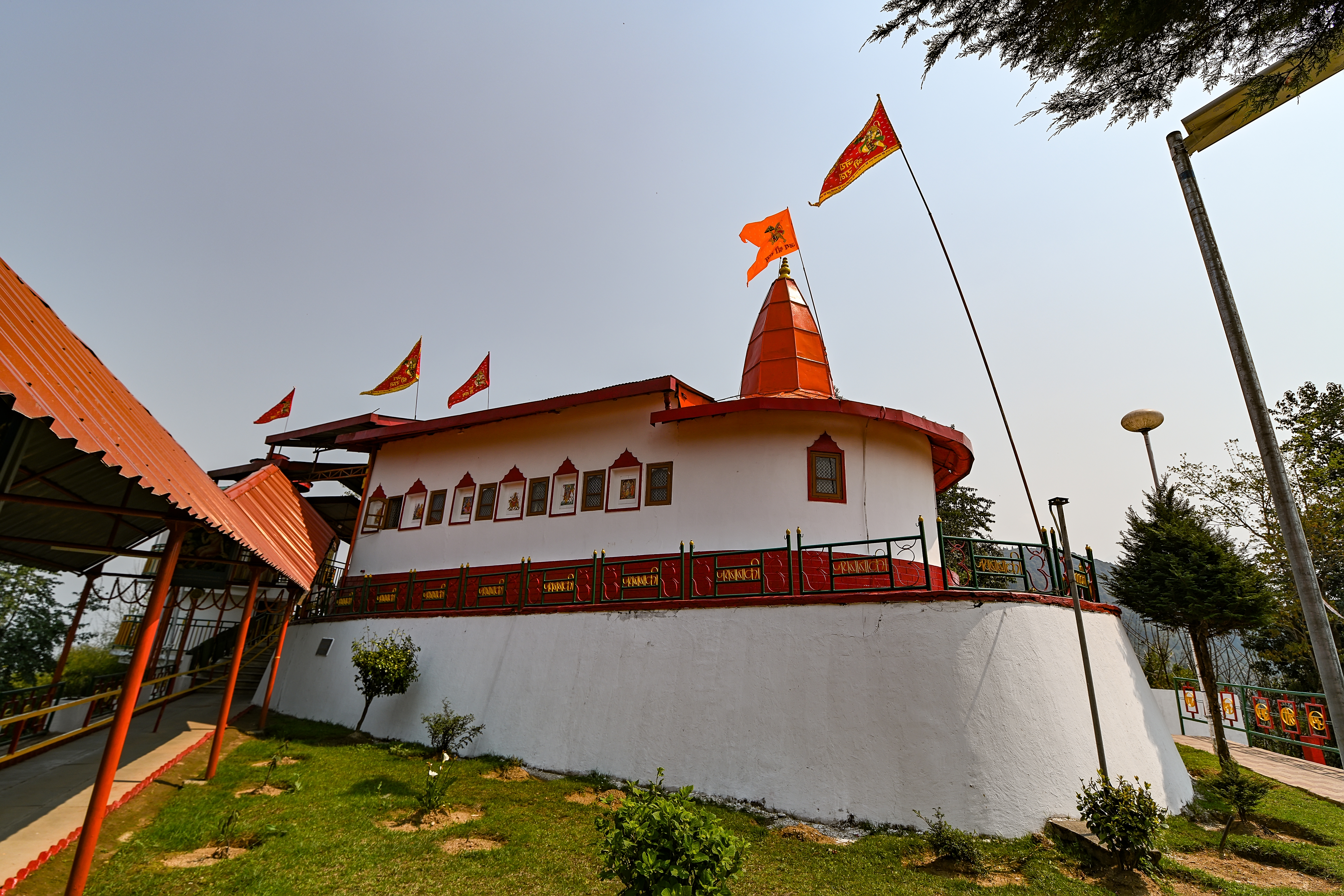
Building of Hanuman Tok

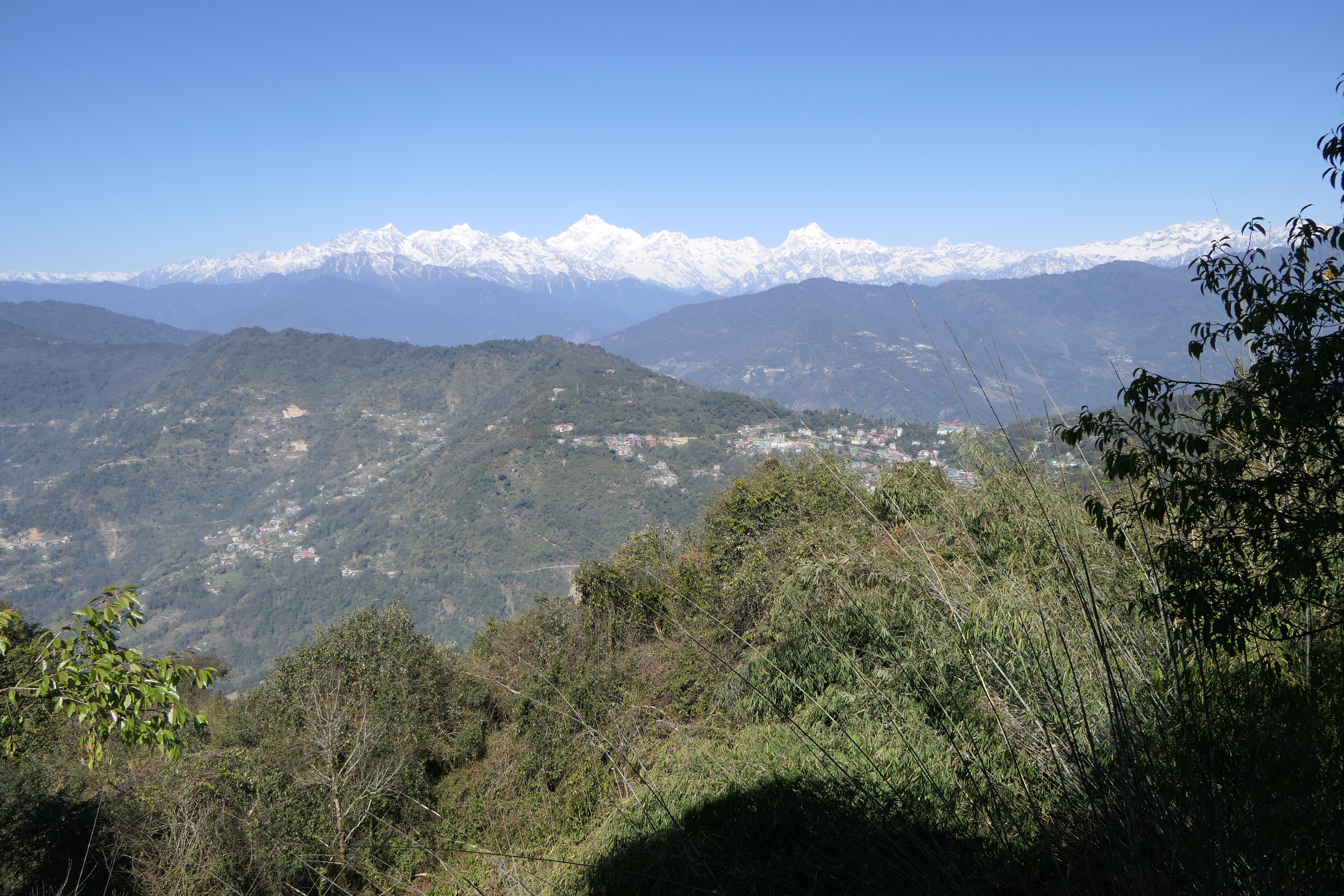
Kangchenjunga as seen from Hanuman Tok

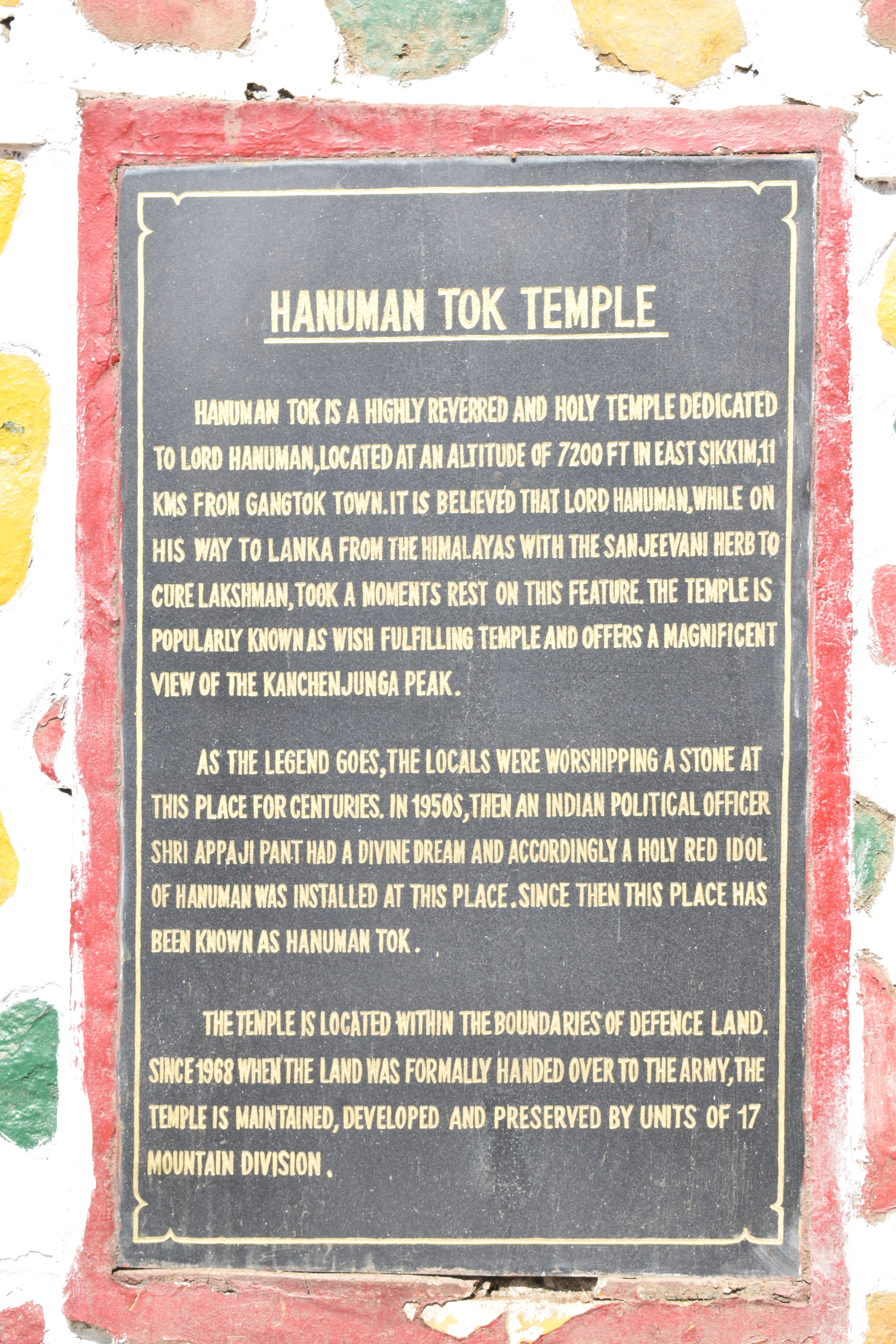
History of Hanuman Tok
