= National Highway 717B (India) =

National Highway in India

National Highway 717B

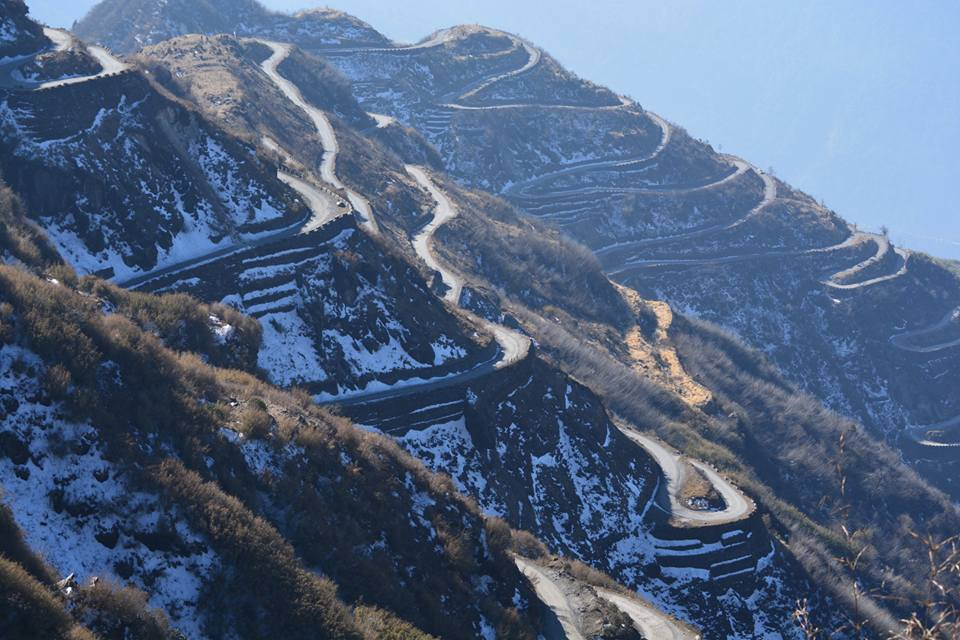
- NH 717B switchbacks at Zuluk

Route information
- Auxiliary route of NH 17
- Length: 80.1 km (49.8 mi)

Major junctions
- South end: Rhenock
- North end: Menla, Sherathang

Location
- Country: India
- States: Sikkim

Highway system
- Roads in India; Expressways; National; State; Asian
← NH 717A	→ NH 310

National Highway 717B, commonly referred to as NH 717B is a national highway in India. It is a secondary spur road of National Highway 17. NH-717B traverses the state of Sikkim in India. The highway is being constructed and maintained by the National Highways and Infrastructure Development Corporation Limited (NHIDCL).

== Route ==
NH717B starts from Rhenock Charfatak towards Rongli, Zuluk, Gnathang, Kupup & Sherathang and ends in Menla in the state of Sikkim.

== Junctions ==
NH 717A Terminal near Rangpo.
NH 310 Terminal near Menla, Sherathang.

== See also ==
- List of national highways in India
- List of national highways in India by state
- National Highway 717A (India)
