= Dzuluk =

- Hamlet
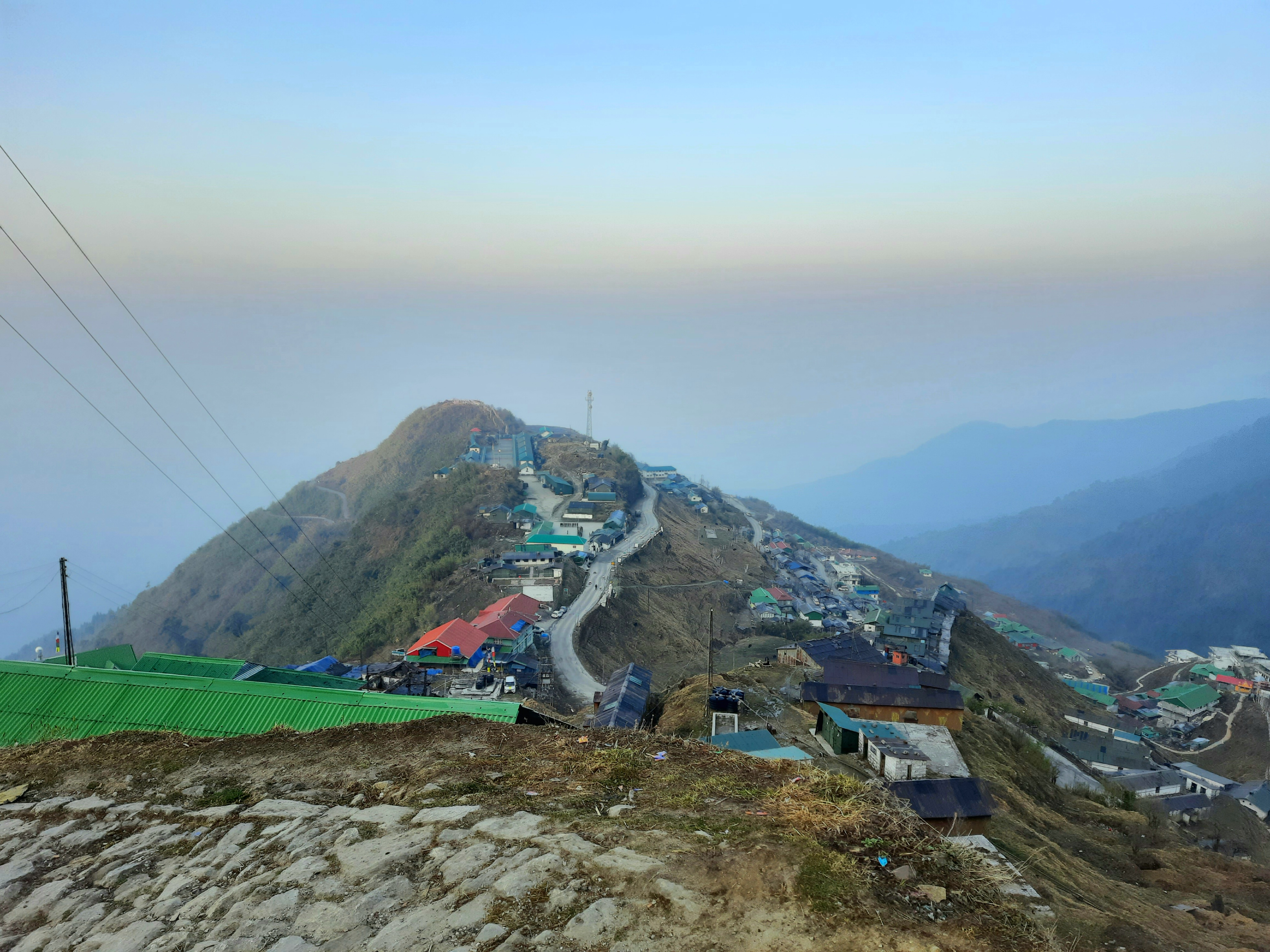
- Zuluk at dawn

- Location in Sikkim, India Dzuluk (India)
- Coordinates: 27.2509908°N 88.7750191°E
- Country: India
- State: Sikkim
- District: Pakyong District
- Elevation: 2,900 m (9,400 ft)

Population
  - Total: 306

Dzuluk or Zuluk or Jhuluk or Jaluk is a small hamlet located at a height of 9,400 feet (2,900 m) on the rugged terrain of the lower Himalayas in Rongli Subdivision of Pakyong District, which lies in the Indian state Sikkim (Pincode 737131). This place is relatively an emerging and offbeat destination in Sikkim. Today it is a tourist destination for the view of the eastern Himalayan mountain range including the Kanchenjunga.

== History ==
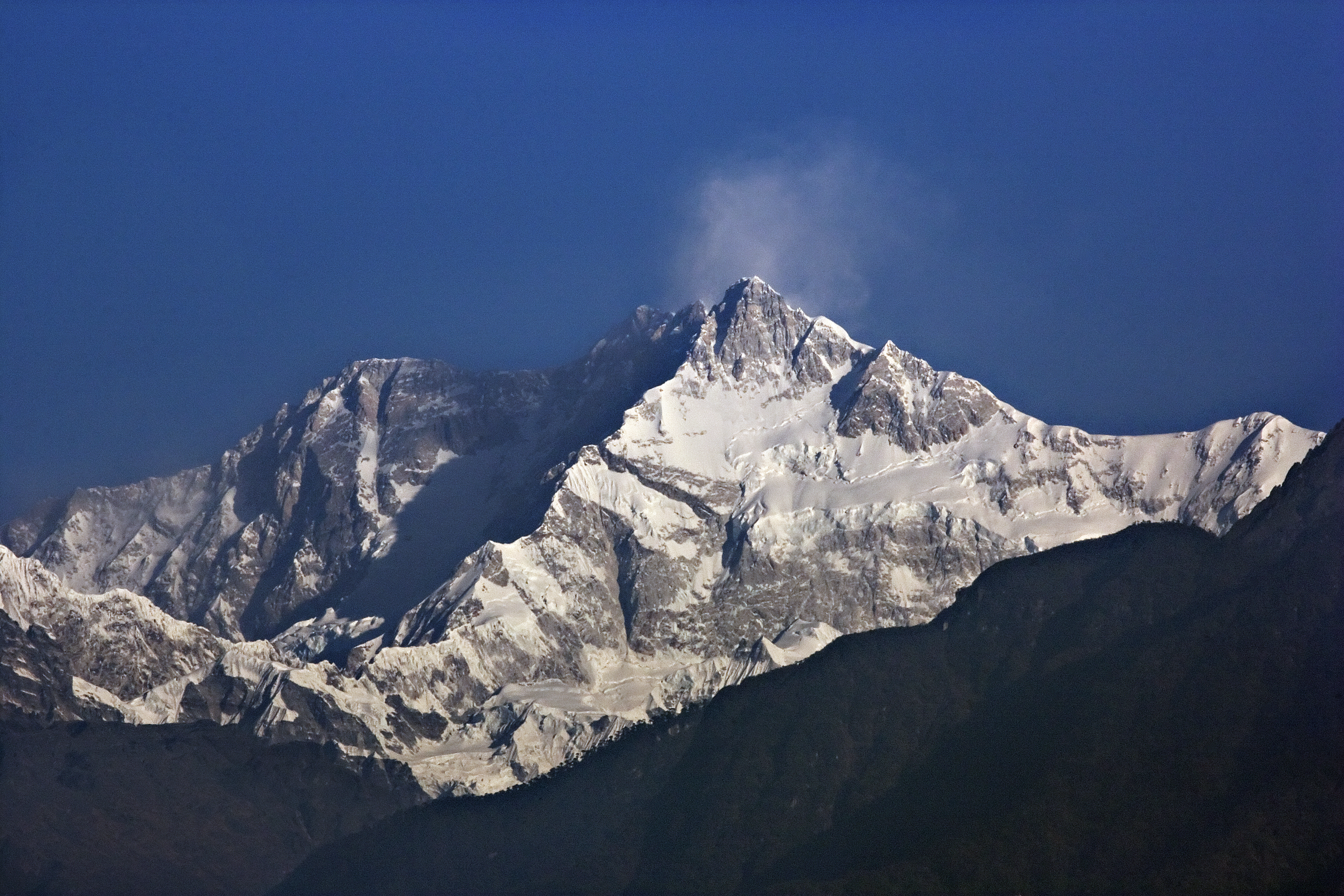
Kangchenjunga from Sikkim

Dzuluk was once a transit point to the trade route between Kalimpong and Tibet. The route was in use even a few decades ago until the 1959 Chinese crackdown in Tibet. It was commonly used by traders traveling to Tibet through Jelep La ("La" stands for mountain pass) as an overnight base. The route started from Kalimpong and passed through Pedong, Aritar, Dzuluk and Jelepla to Chumbi valley in Tibet.

== Geography ==
Dzuluk is located at 27.2518°N 88.7775°E.

== Climate ==
Dzuluk is at an altitude of about 9,400 feet. The summer temperature would be near 20 °C (68 °F) with substantial difference between the day and night temperature. The rainy season is a little protracted, and heavy to very heavy showers are common. The winter may see snowfall in the area of about 3–5 feet (0.91–1.52 m) of snow.

- October to February — winter, cold and snow.
- March to May — cold.
- June to September — the monsoon season.

== Flora and fauna ==
Dzuluk lies on the Pangolakha Wildlife Sanctuary and is surrounded by wild forest, some of which are completely virgin. Sightings of deer, wild dogs, Himalayan bear, and the red panda are common. Some tigers have also reportedly been sighted in the area.

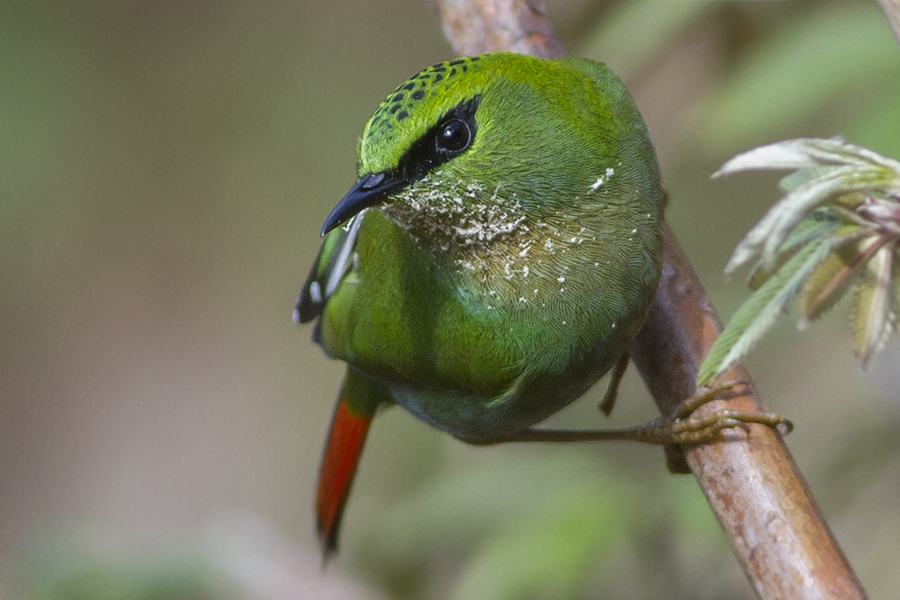
enriched wildlife

Several birds can also be seen such as Blood Pheasant, Himalayan monal, Kalij pheasant, Snow Pheasant and others. During the summer months, the area and its surrounding hills are covered with thousands of blooming rhododendron. Dzuluk during these months is colorful due to the variety of rhododendron.

== Population ==
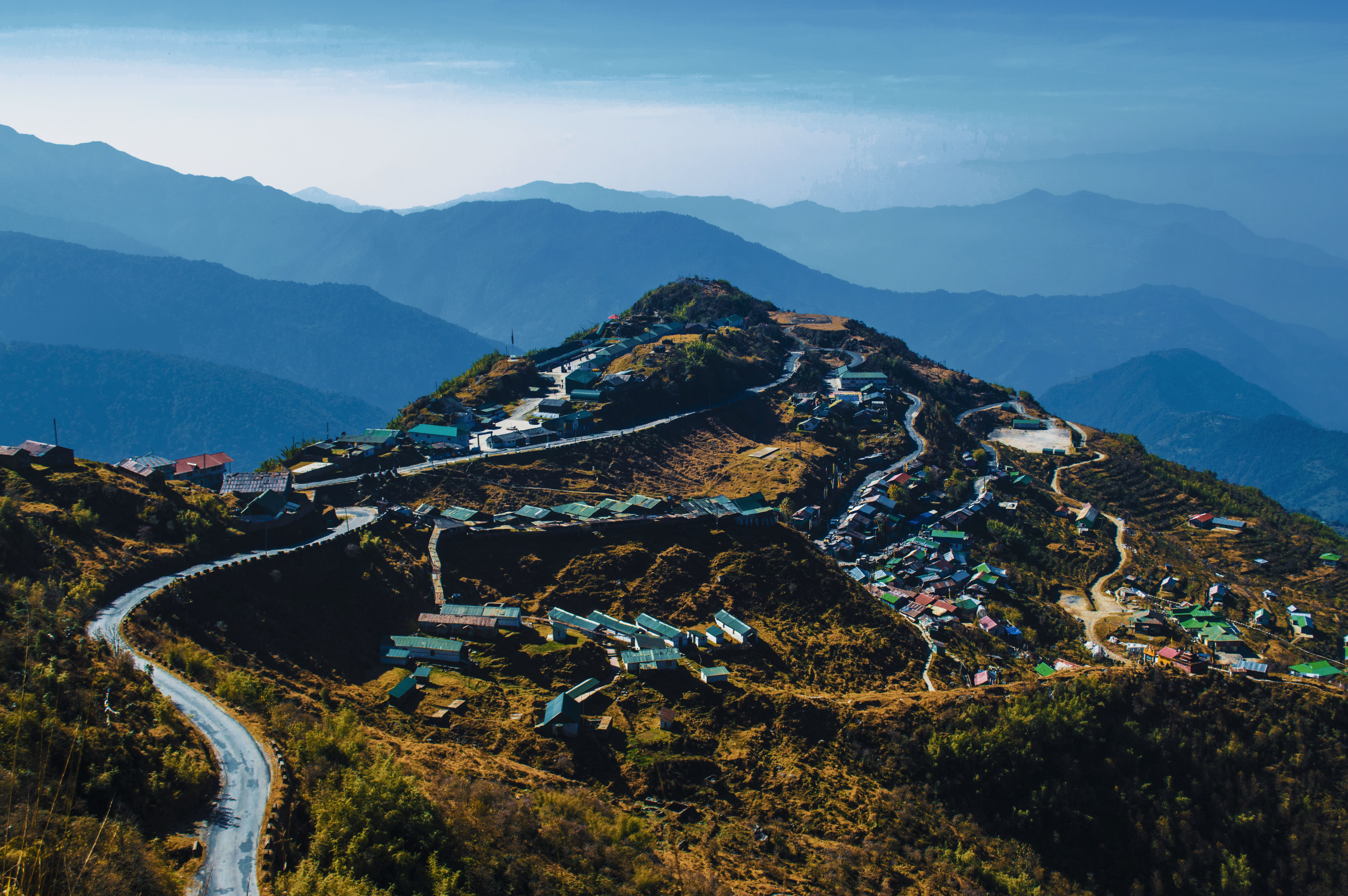
zuluk view

This small village accommodates a population of around 306 people and 65 households. Historically, Zuluk provides the accommodation facilities to the trader and porters of the trade route to Tibet. The trader and porter are mostly from Tibet and Nepal at that instant. In Indo-China war, the pass has closed the trade between India and Tibet were stop, due to the agitation of Indo china War, the most of trader and porter retreat from trade route and some settle there after the war. The remaining settlers used to work in BRO (Border Road Organisation), some in agriculture and the Indian army as a porter. There is an Indian Army base at Dzuluk, which has been used as a transit camp for the army movement to the Indo-Chinese border nearby. Farming is near-impossible due to soil quality and weather, and most of the land is fenced and military-controlled, making it unfit for grazing. BRO (Border Road Organisation), Tourism and porter in the Indian army are the only livelihoods of zuluk.

== Transport ==
=== Air ===
The Pakyong Airport, (IATA airport code PYG) in Pakyong, Sikkim is the nearest airport. One can drive for around 1–3 hours from there to reach Dzuluk.

=== Train ===
Siliguri Junction and New Jalpaiguri railway Station (NJP) in West Bengal are the closest railway stations. A drive of around 7–8 hours will take one to Dzuluk.

=== Road ===
Dzuluk lies on the National Highway-717B connecting Rhenock and Menla, via Rongli. Dzuluk can be reached from Siliguri by various hired vehicle in roughly 7 hours. Tourists can also travel to Dzuluk from Gangtok in roughly 4 hours by hiring vehicles.

- From Gangtok – 90 kilometres (56 mi), about 4 hours
- From NJP / Bagdogra - 160 kilometres (99 mi), about 6 hours
- From Kalimpong – 87 kilometres (54 mi), about 3.5 hours
- From Pelling – 150 kilometres (93 mi), about 7 hours
- From Darjeeling – 140 kilometres (87 mi), about 5 hours

== Nearby places ==
The three-level switchback roads of Dzuluk offer views of the Kangchenjunga and its mountain range. The other attractions of the place include lakes, temples, forests, and a route that leads to Tibet.
