= National Highway 310A (India) =

National highway in India

National Highway 310A
- Map of the National Highway in red

Route information
- Length: 55 km (34 mi)

Major junctions
- South end: Tashiview Point
- North end: Mangan

Location
- Country: India
- States: Sikkim

Highway system
- Roads in India; Expressways; National; State; Asian
← NH 10	→ NH 10

National Highway 310A, commonly referred to as NH 310A is a national highway in India. It is a spur road of National Highway 10. NH-310A traverses the state of Sikkim in East District and North District in India.

== Route ==
Tashiview point - Phodong - Mangan.

== Junctions ==
NH 10 Terminal near Tashiview point.

== See also ==
- List of national highways in India
- List of national highways in India by state
