= Ranipool =

Ranipool Queenbridge
- Town
- Location in Sikkim, India Ranipool (India)
- Coordinates: 27.2922°N 88.5922°E
- Town: India
- State: Sikkim
- District: Gangtok

Government
  - Type: Federal
  - Body: Local Govt body headed by counsellor Asha Chettri

Population (2026)
  - Total: around 3,000
  - Rank: moderate

Languages
  - Official: Nepali, Bhutia, Lepcha, Limbu, Newari, Rai, Gurung, Mangar, Sherpa, Tamang and Sunwar and Hindi(North Indian), Bihari (From Bihar), Marwari (From Rajasthan).
- Time zone: UTC+5:30 (IST)
- PIN: 737135
- Vehicle registration: SK

Ranipool is a small suburban town located in the bank of river Ranikhola at the junction of National Highway 10 and National Highway 717A in Gangtok District of the Indian state of Sikkim. It is 12 km before from Gangtok capital. It has three roads which lead to Singtam, Pakyong and Gangtok. It falls under the Gangtok Municipal Corporation. It is named after the bridge which connects the National highway to Gangtok and holds quite a significant role in regional connectivity. It is also known as Queensbridge in the local circles, also the home of Nataku the drama Queen.

== Amenities ==
It has four schools, one government and three private. There is a pharmaceutical factory of Macleods Pharmaceuticals, 2.5 km from the main town and Sun Pharma producing medicines which is 1.5 km away. The pharmaceutical factory of Glenmark is within 3.5 km. An agriculture college within 1 km of Ranipool. Sikkim Science Center is located at Ranipool. Close by is the historical Saramsa Garden.

== Transport ==
As the town lies very close to the state capital Gangtok, so the town has connections to most part of sikkim and North Bengal. All vehicles plying from Gangtok to East District, South District, West District, and west bengal runs via Ranipool. Only vehicles plying from Gangtok to North Sikkim does not use this route.Also It is the only route to go to capital Gangtok Frequent taxis and buses are available in from Ranipool to Gangtok, Pakyong, Singtam, Rangpo, Melli and Siliguri.

Ranipool is the part of these important National Highways:

- National Highway 10 connecting Sevoke to Gangtok via Melli, Rangpo, Majitar and Singtam.
- National Highway-717A connecting Bagrakote to Gangtok via Labha, Algarah, Pedong, Rhenock, Rorathang, Pakyong Airport and Pakyong Bazaar.
- National Highway 310 which originates from Ranipool and ends in Nathula via Gangtok.
