= Upper Tadong =

- Census town
- Location in Sikkim, India Upper Tadong (India)
- Coordinates: 27.3167°N 88.6000°E
- Country: India
- State: Sikkim
- District: Gangtok

Population (2001)
  - Total: 14,670

Languages
  - Official: Nepali, Bhutia, Lepcha, Limbu, Newari, Rai, Gurung, Mangar, Sherpa, Tamang and Sunwar
- Time zone: UTC+5:30 (IST)
- Vehicle registration: SK

Upper Tadong is a census town in Gangtok District in the Indian state of Sikkim. It falls under Gangtok Municipal Corporation.

== Climate ==
Climate data for Tadong (1991–2020)
Month	Jan	Feb	Mar	Apr	May	Jun	Jul	Aug	Sep	Oct	Nov	Dec	Year
Record high °C (°F)	23.0 (73.4)	26.2 (79.2)	29.1 (84.4)	34.5 (94.1)	32.1 (89.8)	32.0 (89.6)	32.6 (90.7)	33.0 (91.4)	33.1 (91.6)	32.8 (91.0)	28.0 (82.4)	24.0 (75.2)	34.5 (94.1)
Mean daily maximum °C (°F)	16.3 (61.3)	18.7 (65.7)	22.5 (72.5)	25.1 (77.2)	26.2 (79.2)	27.1 (80.8)	26.8 (80.2)	27.3 (81.1)	26.6 (79.9)	25.3 (77.5)	21.7 (71.1)	18.0 (64.4)	23.5 (74.3)
Mean daily minimum °C (°F)	7.0 (44.6)	9.0 (48.2)	11.9 (53.4)	14.3 (57.7)	16.9 (62.4)	19.4 (66.9)	20.0 (68.0)	19.9 (67.8)	19.0 (66.2)	15.5 (59.9)	11.4 (52.5)	8.4 (47.1)	14.4 (57.9)
Record low °C (°F)	0.6 (33.1)	0.0 (32.0)	4.8 (40.6)	7.6 (45.7)	8.6 (47.5)	13.1 (55.6)	16.2 (61.2)	14.3 (57.7)	12.7 (54.9)	8.3 (46.9)	0.8 (33.4)	2.4 (36.3)	0.0 (32.0)
Average rainfall mm (inches)	21.5 (0.85)	47.6 (1.87)	117.0 (4.61)	302.6 (11.91)	430.6 (16.95)	559.7 (22.04)	565.4 (22.26)	493.9 (19.44)	387.4 (15.25)	151.7 (5.97)	26.0 (1.02)	13.1 (0.52)	3,116.5 (122.70)
Average rainy days	2.1	3.9	8.8	15.2	19.1	22.3	25.8	24.2	19.5	7.6	1.6	1.2	151.1
Average relative humidity (%) (at 17:30 IST)	65	64	63	68	74	79	83	82	81	74	71	69	73
Source: India Meteorological Department

== Demographics ==
At the 2001 census of India, Upper Tadong had a population of 14,670. Males constituted 54% of the population and females 46%. Upper Tadong had an average literacy rate of 76%, higher than the national average of 59.5%: male literacy was 80%, and female literacy was 71%. In Upper Tadong, 10% of the population was under 6 years of age.
