= Aritar, Sikkim =

Aritar आरिटार
- Hill station
- Location in Sikkim, India Aritar (India)
- Coordinates: 27°11′17″N 88°40′29″E
- Country: India
- State: Sikkim
- District: Pakyong District
- Elevation 4600 ft: 1,498 m (4,915 ft)

Languages
  - Official: Nepali, Bhutia, Lepcha, Limbu, Newari, Rai, Gurung, Mangar, Sherpa, Tamang and Sunwar
- Time zone: UTC+5:30 (IST)
- Vehicle registration: SK

Aritar is a hill station in the Pakyong District under Rongli Sub-Division of the Indian state of Sikkim.

== Geography ==
It is located on the edge of the Himalayas, 67 kilometres from Gangtok, 52 kilometres from Kalimpong, 40 kilometres from Pakyong and 30 kilometres from Rangpo.

It is isolated from the rest of the state, on the far eastern border of Sikkim and bounded by Mt. Kanchendzonga. The region is characterized by lush forests, mountains and rivers. Aritar Lake (Ghati-Tso) is a nearby attraction, as are traditional villages and monasteries such as Lingsay.

Lampokhari is one of the oldest natural lakes in Sikkim, constructed to facilitate boating. At an altitude of 4600 ft (1,400 m) it is the only boat-ready lake in Sikkim.

Dak Bungalow : Popularly known as Ari-Bangla, it is an old British-built dak bungalow built by Sir James Claude White (first political officer of Sikkim during British rule in India) in the year 1895. At the same premises Sikkim’s first treasury was built as well as Sikkim Police was raised and the first outpost started functioning in the year 1897.

Aritar Gumpa : A monastery of the Kagyuapa order, considered as one of the holiest and oldest in Sikkim. Its traditional architecture, carved and painted murals, and multitude of manuscripts and icons reflect the monastic art of Sikkim.

Parbateyswar Shivalaya Mandir : The most venerated shrine with picturesque splendour is considered a very holy pilgrimage site, where thousands of devotees throng for the blessing and participate during the month of "SAWAN" to offer water and sip the sacred water from a sacred vessel.

Mankhim: "Mangkhim", a Temple of the Rai of Kirati origin is located at a height of 6500 ft at "Maity Village" (Kheselakha). Hattipailay is another virgin village where the visitors can see elephant footprints on rock.

Nirmal Dham : This place situated about 5 km (approx) from Rhenock Bazar, is an abode of "Nirmal Guruji" (a.k.a.) " Kopchey Baba", known for his miraculous healing power, which has attracted hundreds of devotees from all over India and neighbouring countries.

Ever green nursery & Ram Gauri Sangrhalaya : Located at Rhenock Bazar, the nursery and museum is privately owned and has drift wood collections, botanical & other varieties of flowers.

Kali khola falls (Lonely falls) : 100 m in height (Rorathang-Rongli road)

Changey water fall : 50 m in height (Near Lampokhari)

Lungchok valley : Trekking destination (Lokdara, Chujachen)

Love Dara : Low hill picnic spot. Aritar.

=== Gallery ===
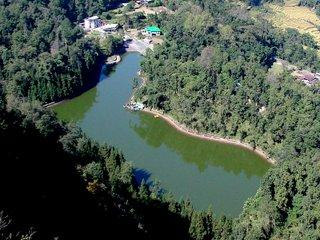
Ghati Tso(lake) of Aritar

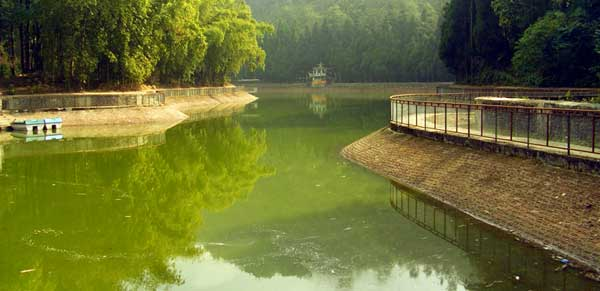
Ghati Tso of Aritar

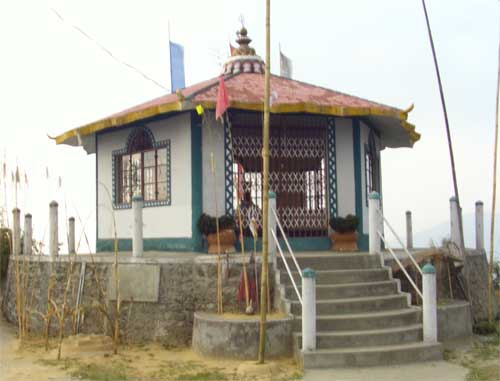
Mankhim (Temple) of Rai (ethnic group) of Kirati Origin
