= Lake Tsomgo =

Glacial lake in Sikkim, India

Lake Tsomgo Changu Lake
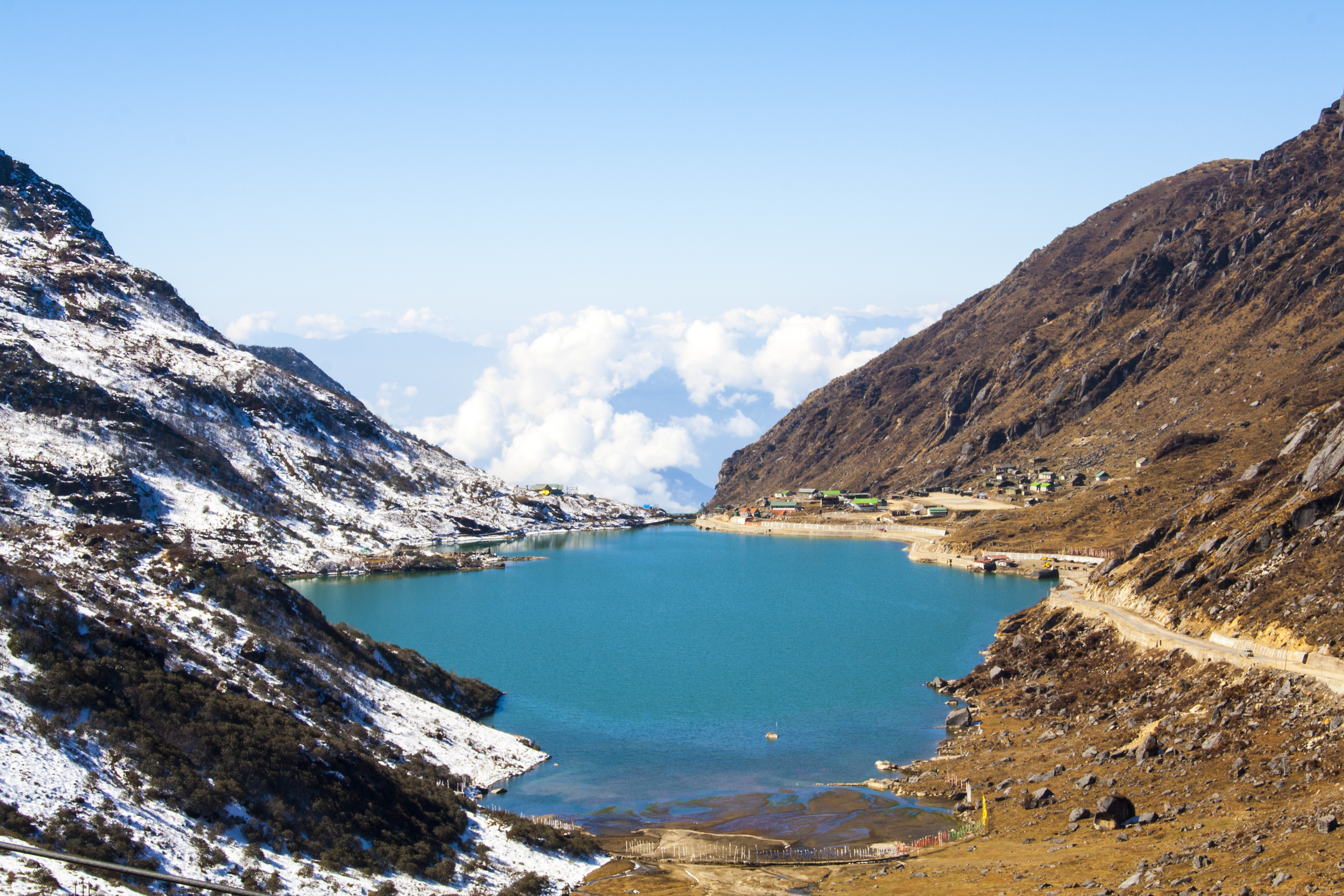
- Lake Tsomgo in Gangtok district (Sikkim)

- Location in Sikkim
- Location: Changu, Gangtok district, Sikkim
- Coordinates: 27°22′31″N 88°45′50″E
- Basin countries: India
- Max. length: 836 metres (2,743 ft)
- Max. width: 427 metres (1,401 ft)
- Surface area: 24.47 hectares (60.5 acres)
- Average depth: 4.58 metres (15.0 ft) (average)
- Max. depth: 15 metres (49 ft)
- Surface elevation: 3,753 metres (12,313 ft)
- Frozen: winter

Tsomgo Lake, also known as Tsongmo Lake or Changgu Lake, is a glacial lake in Changu in the Gangtok district of the Indian state of Sikkim, some 40 kilometres (25 mi) from the capital Gangtok. Located at an elevation of 3,753 m (12,313 ft), the lake remains frozen during the winter season. The lake surface reflects different colours with change of seasons and is held in great reverence by the local Sikkimese people. Buddhist monks prognosticated after studying the changing colours of the lake.

== Etymology ==
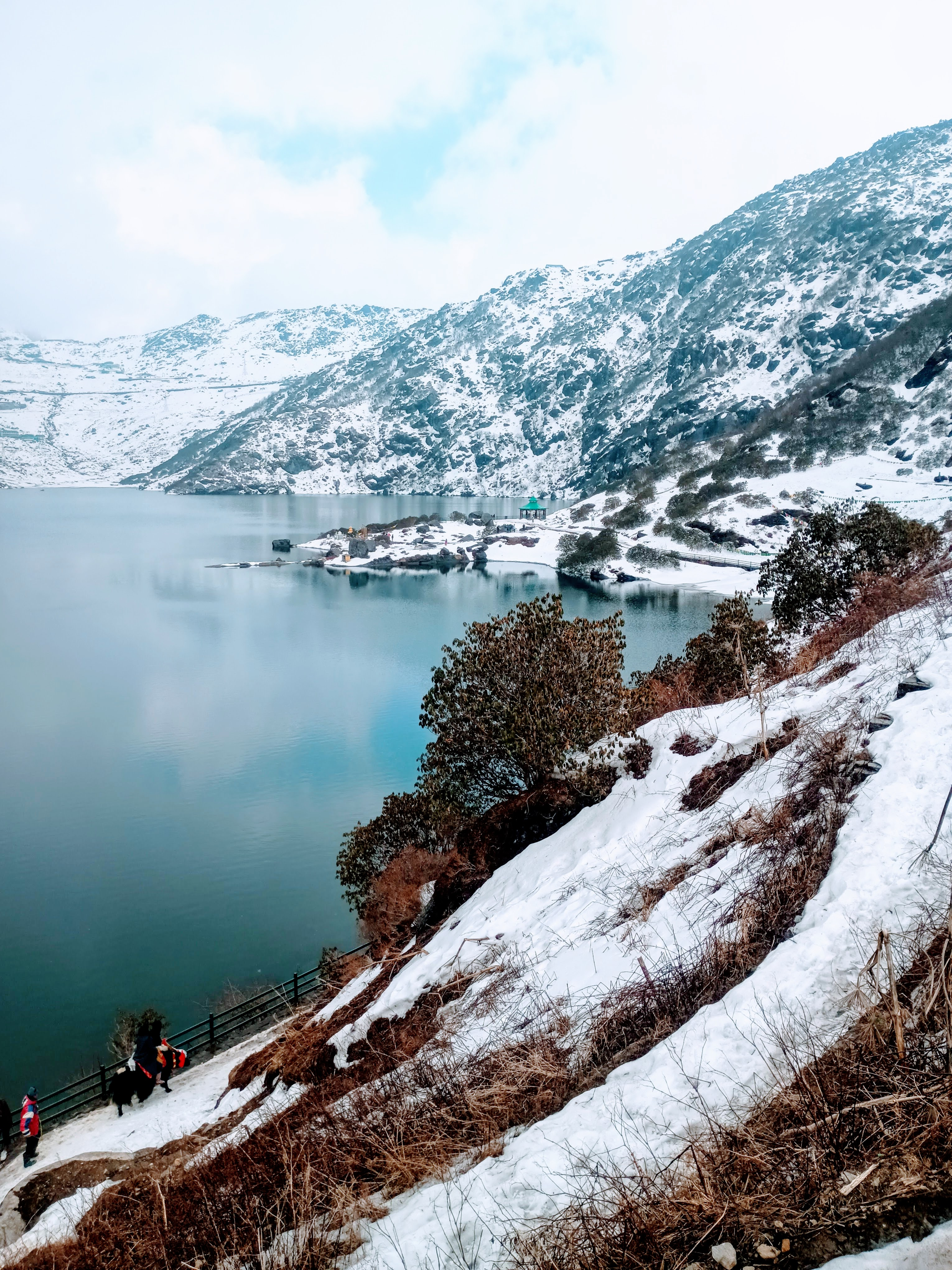
Tsomgo Lake in 2026

In Sikkimese language the name Tsomgo is made of two words 'Tso' meaning "lake" and 'Mgo' meaning "head" which gives the literal meaning as "source of the lake".

== Topography ==
The lake is surrounded by steep mountains which are covered with snow during winter. During summer the snow cover melts and forms the source for the lake. The lake which remains frozen in winter season, sometimes extending up to May, receives an average annual precipitation of 1,183 millimetres (46.6 in) with temperatures recorded in the range of 0–25 °C (32–77 °F).

The lake is about 40 kilometres (25 mi) away from Gangtok on the Gangtok-Nathula highway. Further, the road to Nathu La skirts the lake on the north side. The Chinese border crossing is only some 5 kilometres (3.1 mi) east-northeast in a straight line, but some 18 kilometres (11 mi) by road.

== Features ==
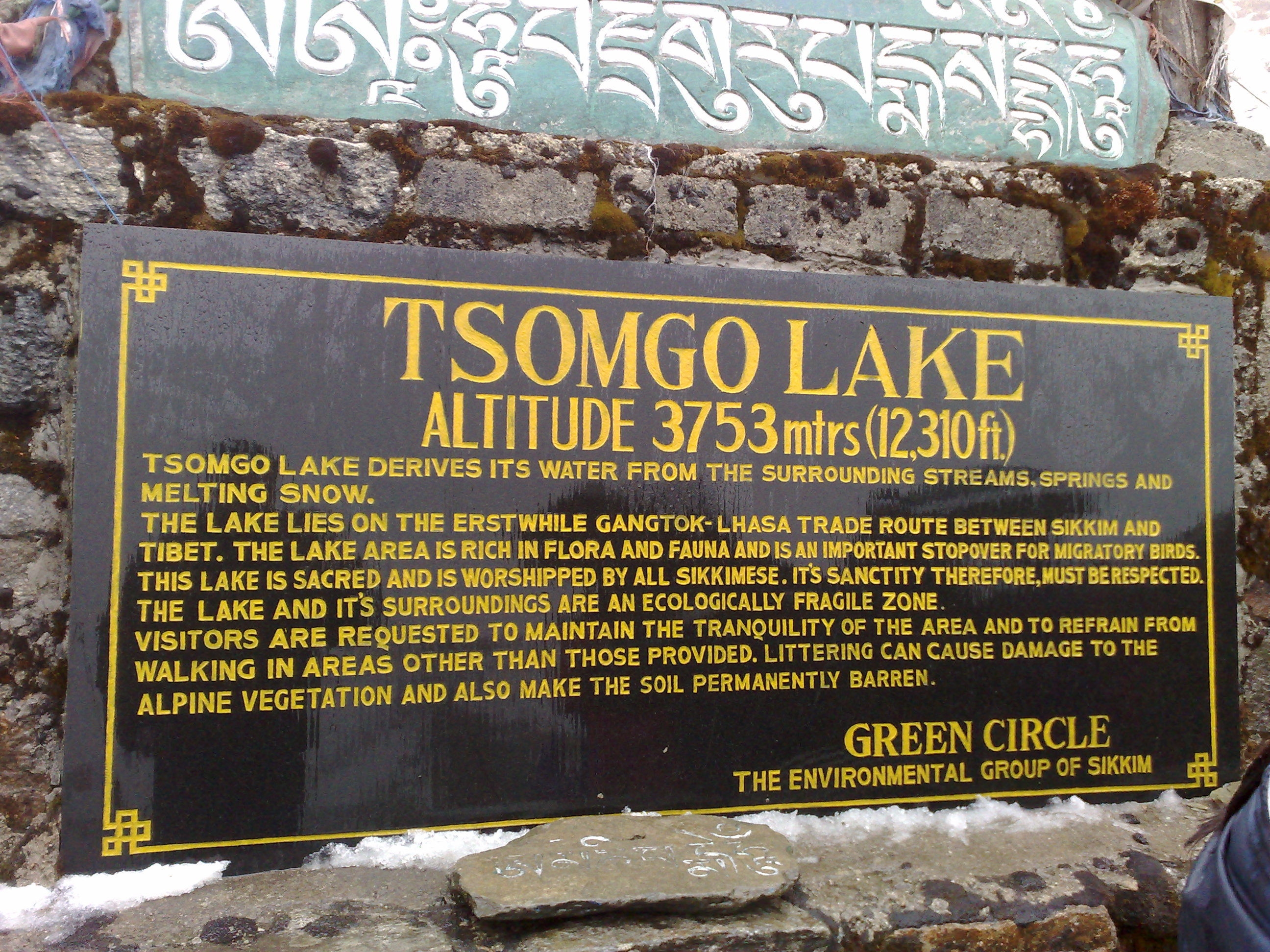
Sign for Tsomgo Lake

The lake is formed in an oval shape and has a surface area of 24.47 hectares (60.5 acres). The maximum length of the lake is 836 metres (2,743 ft) and has a maximum width of 427 metres (1,401 ft). The maximum depth reported is 15 metres (49 ft) while the average depth is 4.58 metres (15.0 ft). The lake water quality is of moderate turbidity.

The lake is the venue for the Guru Purnima festival which is also the Raksha Bandhan festival when the faith healers known as Jhakris of Sikkim assemble at the lake area to derive benefits from the healing qualities of the lake waters.

Alpine forests cover the catchment of the lake. After the winter season ends in middle of May, the periphery of lake has scenic blooms of flower species of rhododendrons (the state tree of Sikkim), primulas, blue and yellow poppies, irises and so forth. Also seen in the precincts of the lake are several species of birds including Brahminy ducks. Wildlife seen includes the red panda.

Tourist attractions at the lake site include joy rides on decorated yaks and mules where kiosks offer variety of food and drinks. There is also a small Shiva temple on the bank of the lake.

== Entry permits ==
As the lake is located in a restricted area it is essential for all Indians visiting the area to obtain permits. In case of foreign nationals special permit is essential.

Indian Postal Service released a commemorative stamp on the lake on 6 November 2006.

== Border trade market ==
The nearby habitation of Changgu was declared a border trade market in 2003.

Changgu

== Gallery ==
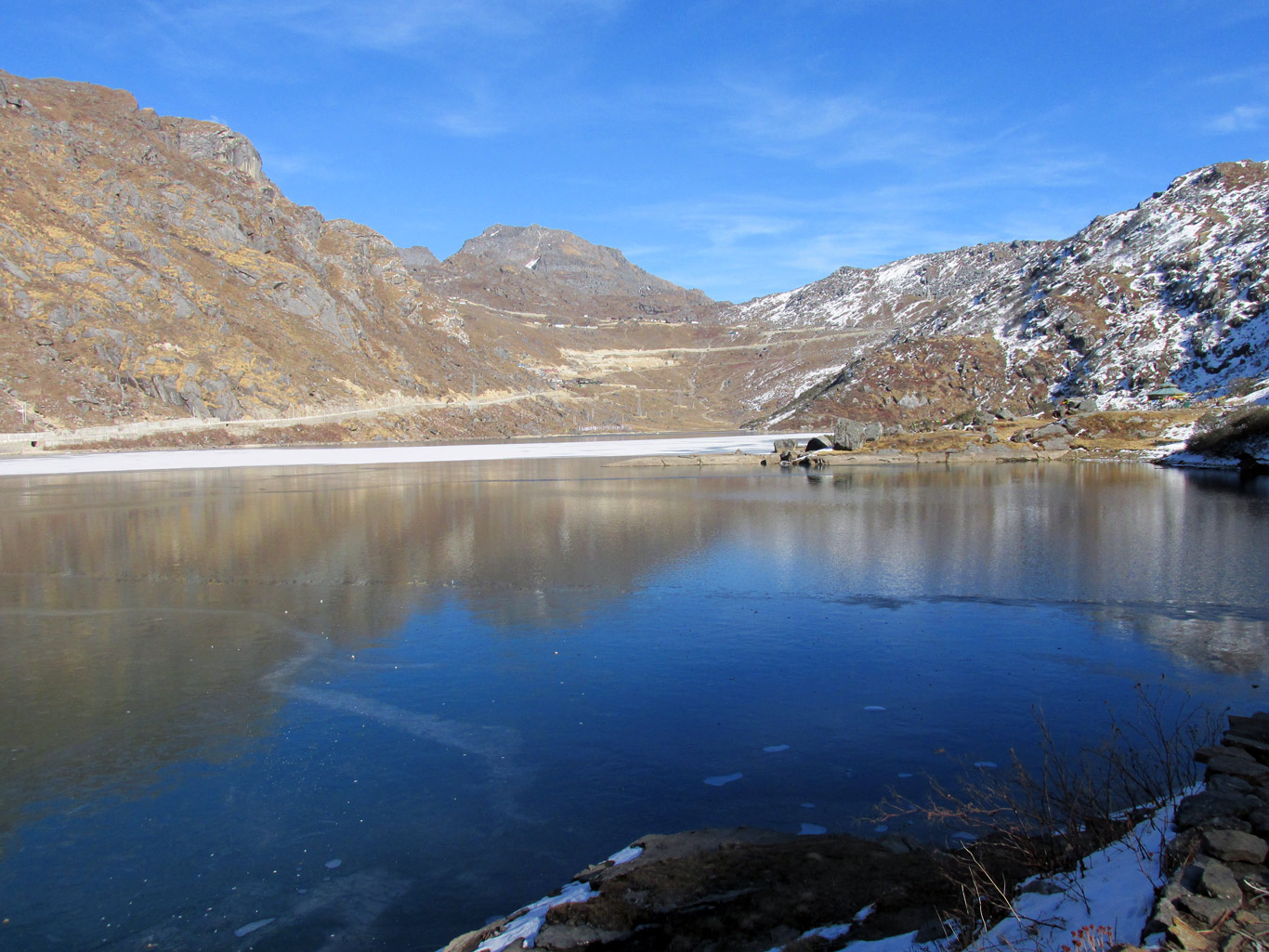
Tsongmo Lake, January 2014

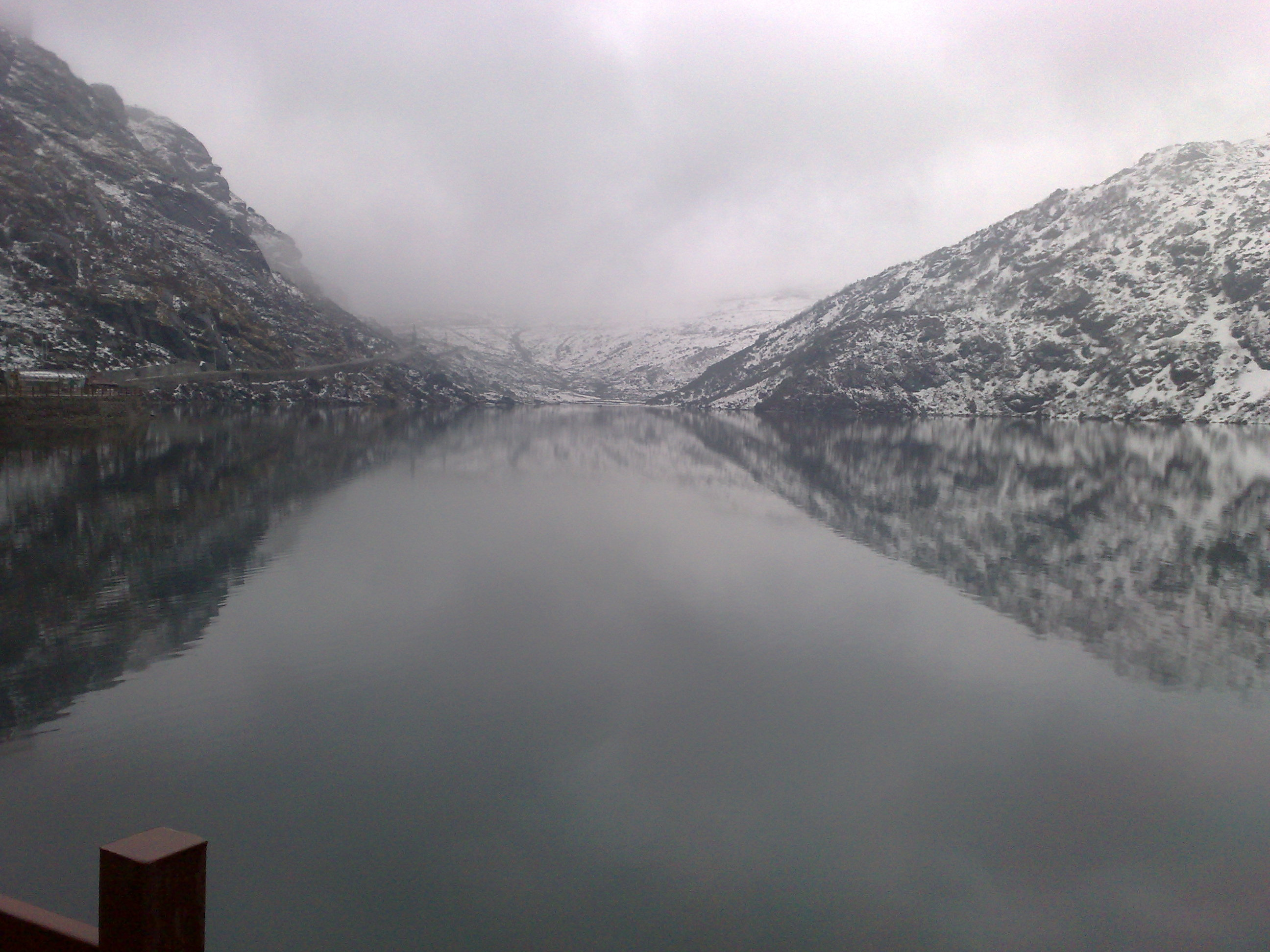
Tsomgo Lake

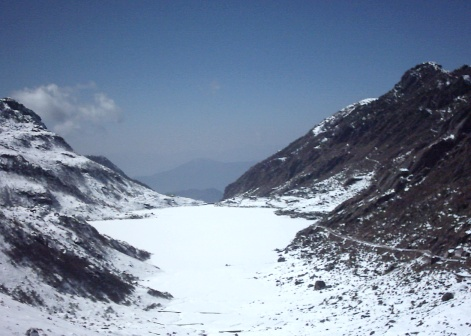
Tsongmo Lake in Winter

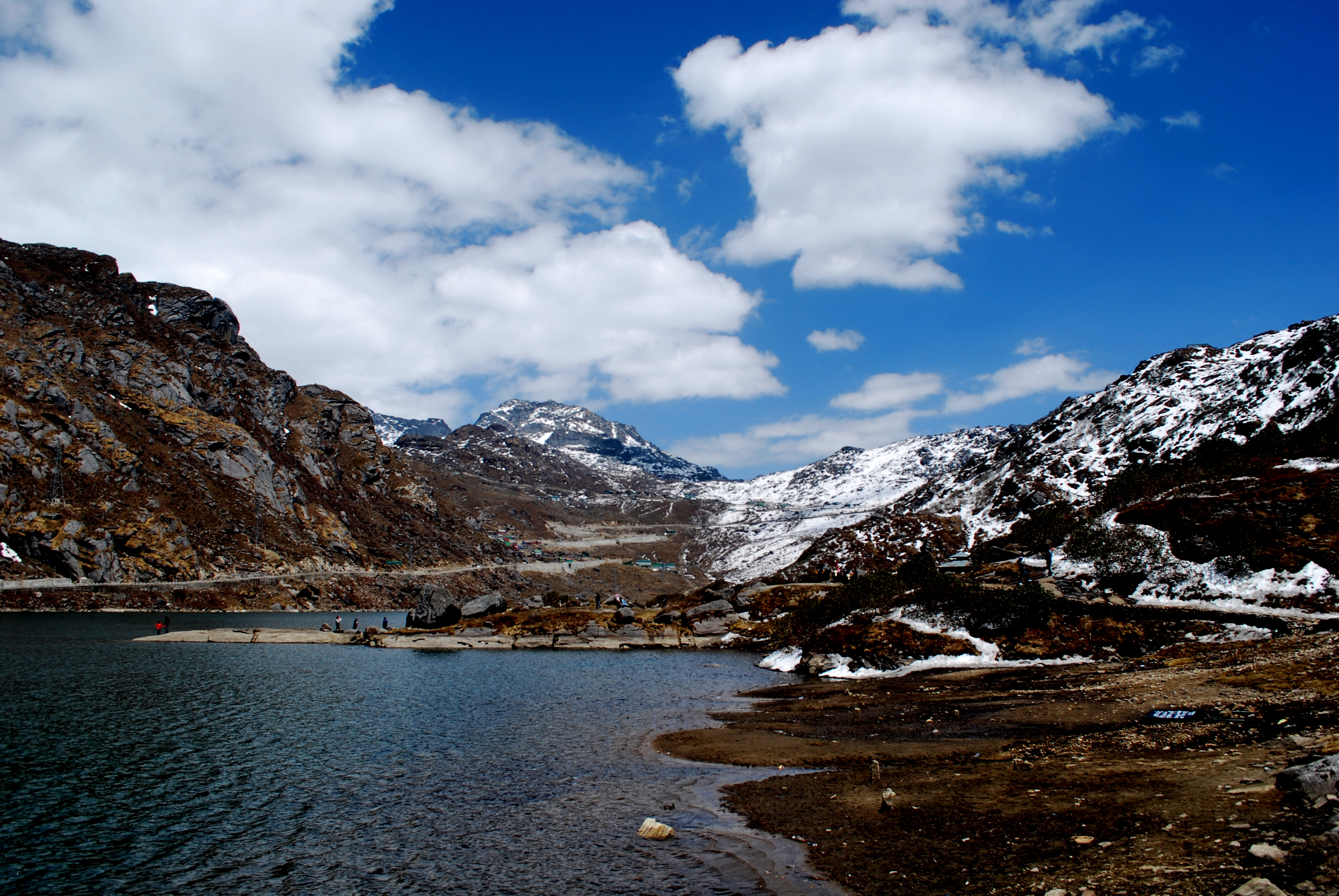
Tsomgo Lake in April 2017

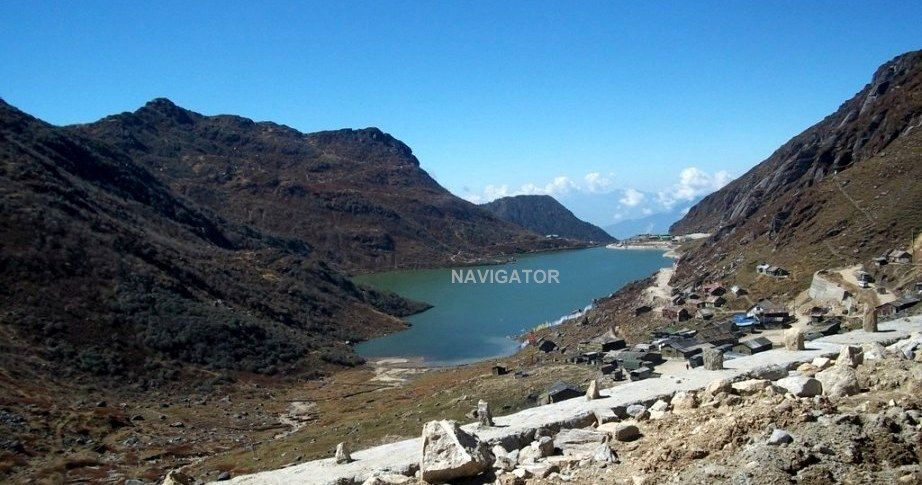
Tsomgo Lake in October

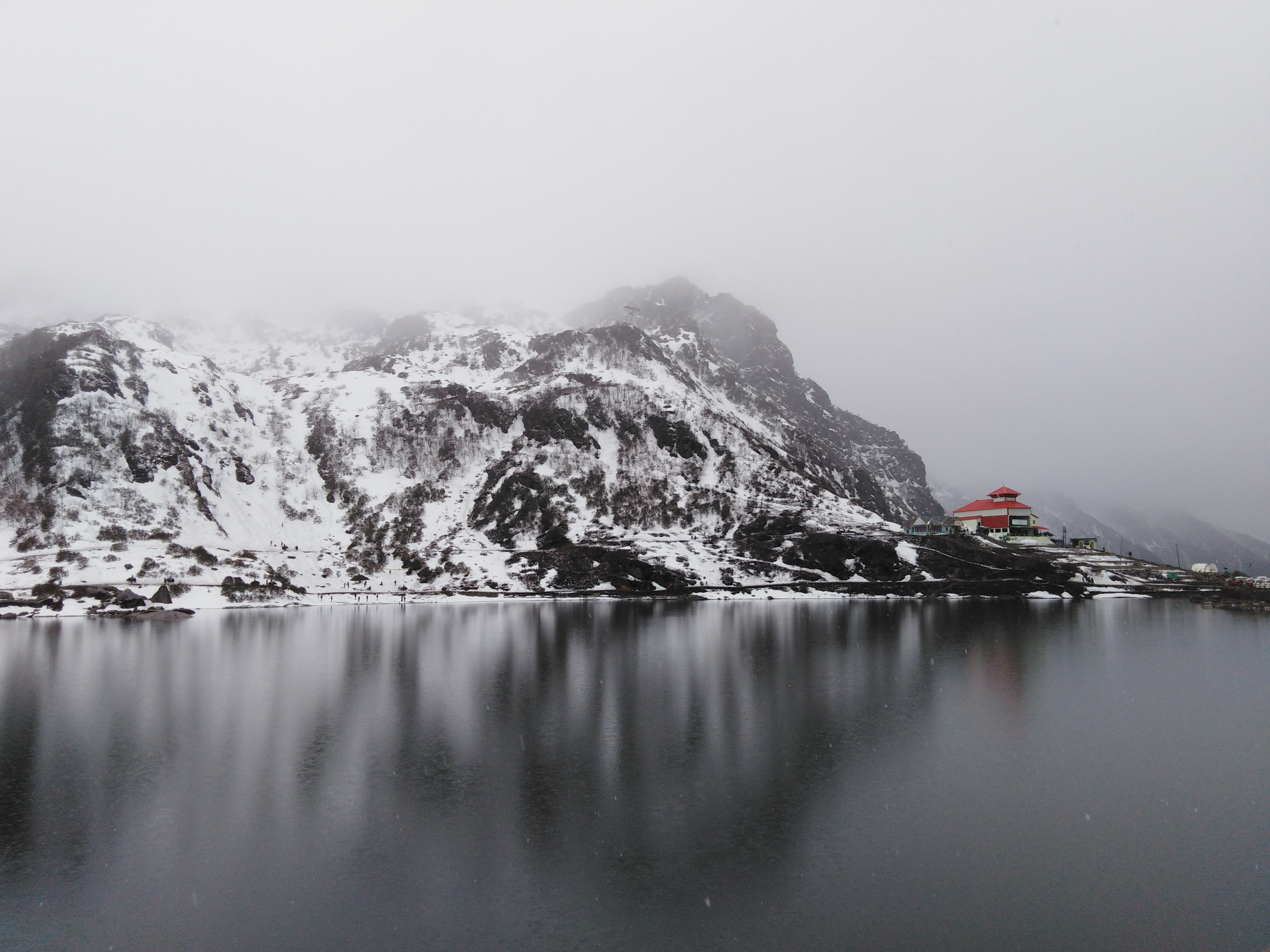
Tsomgo Lake in April 2019

== See also ==
- Tilicho Lake
- Gurudongmar Lake
- Nathu La

== Tourist Attraction ==
It is one of the biggest tourism draws in the Eastern Himalayan state of Sikkim receiving around 300,000 (3 lakh) tourists annually. The best time to visit the lake is January to March.

== Bibliography ==
- Kar, Devashish (28 January 2014). Wetlands and Lakes of the World. Springer Science & Business Media. ISBN 978-81-322-1023-8.
