= Sherathang =

- Town
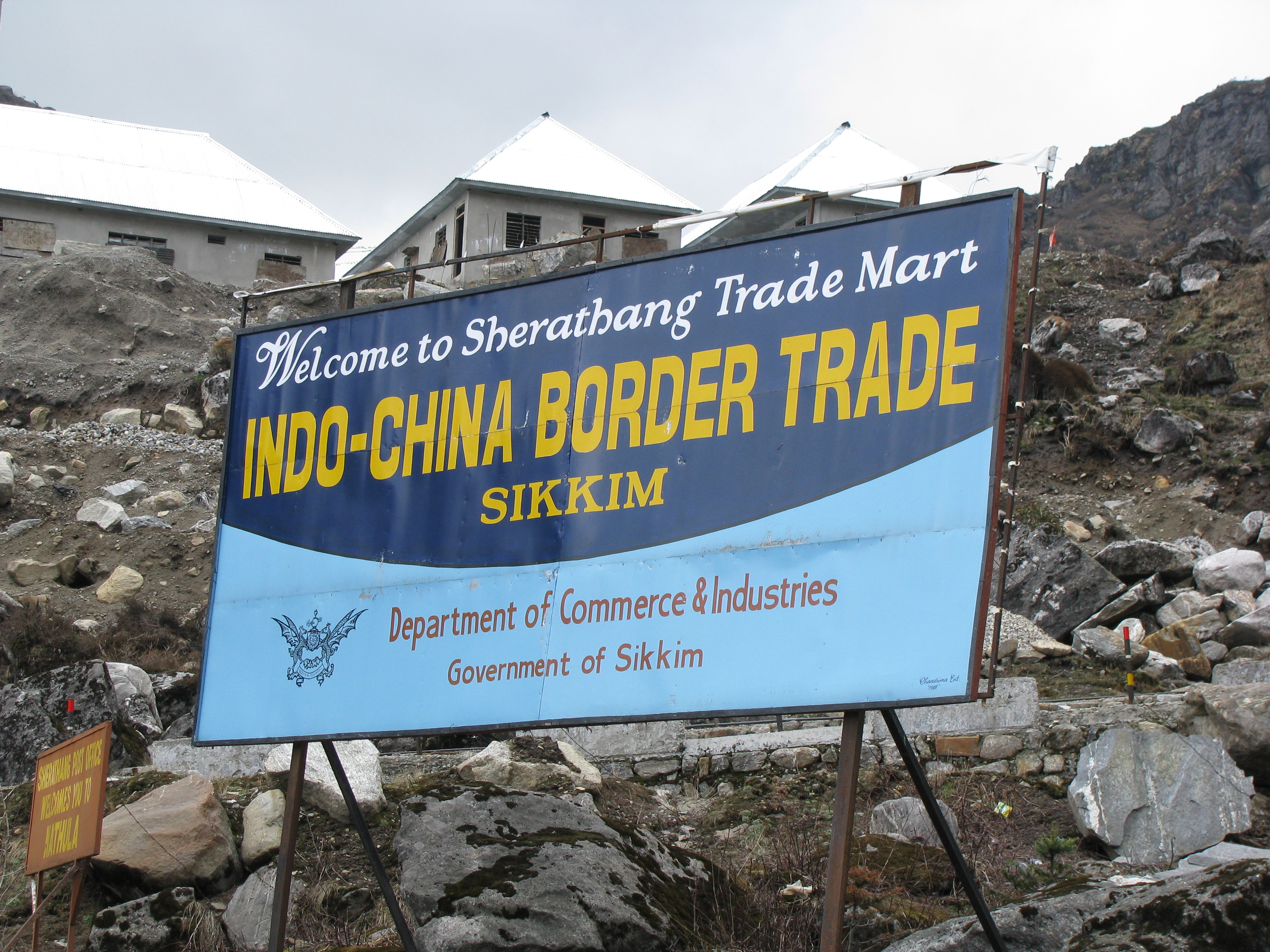

- Location in Sikkim, India
- Coordinates: 27°23′N 88°49′E
- Country: India
- State: Sikkim

Languages
  - Official: Nepali, Lepcha, Limbu, Newari, Rai, Gurung, Bhutia, Mangar, Sherpa, Tamang and Sunwar
- Time zone: UTC+5:30 (IST)
- PIN: 737103
- Vehicle registration: SK
- Lok Sabha: Sikkim Constituency
- Nearest city: Gangtok
- Vidhan Sabha: Kabi Lungchok Constituency
- Website: eastsikkim.nic.in

Sherathang is a town in Gangtok district near the Nathu La Pass in Sikkim, India. The location has been identified as the site for excise, customs and checking for trade between India and China. Rinqingang is the corresponding location in China.

Sherathang has an Indo-Tibetan Border Police border post, which is one of the India-China Border Personnel Meeting points (BPM points). A regular scheduled international mail exchange between India Post and China Post takes place here twice a week. There is a war memorial at Sherathang to commemorate the Indian Army's martyrs and war heroes of 1967 Nathu La and Cho La clashes.

== Border crossing ==
Sherathang in India and Rinchengang in Tibet are the designated India-China border trade marts for the local cross-border trade. In 2003, the governments of India and China agreed to use these locations as designated border trade mart.

Sherathang border post is also a mail exchange point between India Post and China. On Indian side, the mail from mainland India is received at India Post’s Siliguri office, send to Indian Army's Upper Tadong-based 77 Field post office, "The mail, mostly letters are vetted and then sealed in a bag and a manifest issued for the Chinese post office at Yathung in Tibet’s Chumbi Valley is sent to the India Post’s Gangtok head office, from where the sealed bag is collected by the Sherathang postman. While the mail exchange on the Indian side of the border takes place every Sunday, the exchange on the Chinese side takes place every Thursday."

== Infrastructure ==
The Power Department of the Government of Sikkim commissioned a 2X5 MVA, 66/11KV, Sherathang sub-station, which is the highest altitude permanent power sub-station in India and second highest in the world, at an altitude of 13,600 feet. Geographical remoteness and extreme weather, frequent blizzards and wide-ranging temperatures – between -10 and 20 C in the summer – make managing a power station a herculean task.

Sherathang Trade Mart has the highest altitude permanent internet café in the world, at an altitude of 13,600 feet. It was added to the Limca Book of Records 2007. This internet café also doubles as a photographic studio, provides scanning and faxing facilities. The café was set up by the Community Information Centre (CIC) of the Sikkim Information Technology (IT) department and inaugurated by the Chief Secretary of the hill state, N.D. Chingapa, on 21 April 2006.

== Notable landmarks ==
- Sherathang War Memorial

== See also ==
- Border Personnel Meeting point

== Bibliography ==
- Harris, Tina (2013). Geographical Diversions: Tibetan Trade, Global Transactions. University of Georgia Press. ISBN 978-0-8203-4573-4.
- Mathou, Thierry (2004), "Bhutan–China Relations: Towards a New step in Himalayan Politics" (PDF), The Spider and The Piglet: Proceedings of the First International Seminar on Bhutanese Studies, Thimpu: The Centre for Bhutan Studies
