= National Highway 10 (India) =

National highway in India

National Highway 10
- Map of National Highway 10 in red

Route information
- Length: 174 km (108 mi) 28 Km under NHIDCL

Major junctions
- South end: NH 27 in Siliguri, West Bengal
- List: NH 17 near Sevoke, West Bengal; NH 710 in Melli, West Bengal; NH 510 in Singtam, Sikkim; NH 717A in Ranipool, Sikkim
- North end: NH 310 in Gangtok, Sikkim

Location
- Country: India
- States: West Bengal, Sikkim

Highway system
- Roads in India; Expressways; National; State; Asian
← NH 9	→ NH 11

National Highway 10 (NH 10) is a national highway in North East India that goes from Siliguri to Gangtok. It passes through the Indian states of West Bengal and Sikkim.The highway is being maintained by the National Highways and Infrastructure Development Corporation Limited (NHIDCL) from Rangpo to Ranipool (28 km) in the state of Sikkim.

Before renumbering, the stretch between Siliguri and Sevoke was known as NH 31/C, while the section between Sevoke and Gangtok was known as NH 31A.

== Route ==
Schematic map of National Highways in India

NH10 starts from Siliguri and continues to Sevoke, Kalijhora, Rambi Bazar, Teesta Bazaar, Kalimpong, Melli in West Bengal and Rangpo, Majitar, Singtam, Ranipool and terminating at Gangtok in the State of Sikkim. Atal Setu Bridge constructed by NHIDCL, the longest roadway bridge of Sikkim is also the part of National Highway 10 which lies on the border of West Bengal's Kalimpong district and Sikkim's Pakyong District at the town of Rangpo.

== See also ==
- List of national highways in India
- List of national highways in India by state
- National Highways Development Project
- National Highway 717A
