= Kupup =

Kupup Kophu
- Hamlet
- Interactive map of Kupup
- Location within Sikkim Location within India
- Coordinates: 27°20′36″N 88°50′27″E
- Country: India
- State: Sikkim
- District: Gangtok
- Elevation: 4,298 m (14,101 ft)

Population (2017)
  - Total: 250

Kupup (Note: Alternative spellings: Kapup, Kupuk and Kophu.) is a hamlet in the Indian state of Sikkim near the border with China. It lies in a transverse valley below the Dongkya Range, close to the Jelep La pass. A nearby moraine ridge across the valley forms part of the watershed between the Teesta and Dichu river basins. To the southeast of the ridge is the lake Bitang Tso (Note: Alternative spellings: Bithang Tso, Bidang Tso, Bedang Tso, and Bidantso. The meaning is explained as "the lake of the cow-yak".), also called the Elephant Lake or Kupup Lake, from which the Dichu river is conventionally believed to originate.

Beyond the valley of Dichu to the east is the Mount Gipmochi, which China claims as the trijunction between India, Bhutan and itself, but this is disputed by Bhutan and India. The Doka La pass, next to Gipmochi where India has a border outpost, is accessed from Kupup via a border road.

== Geography ==
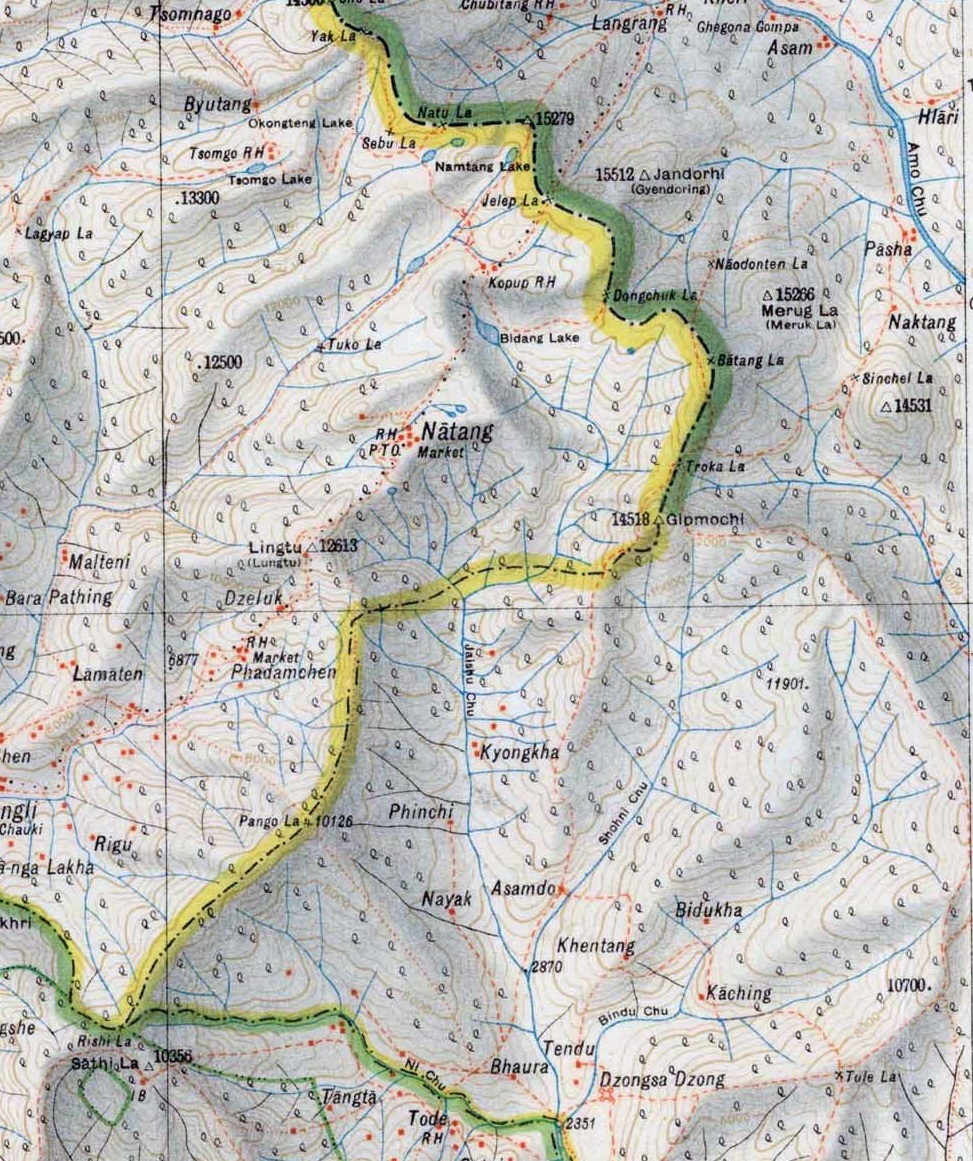
Kupup below the Jelep La pass (Survey of India, 1923)

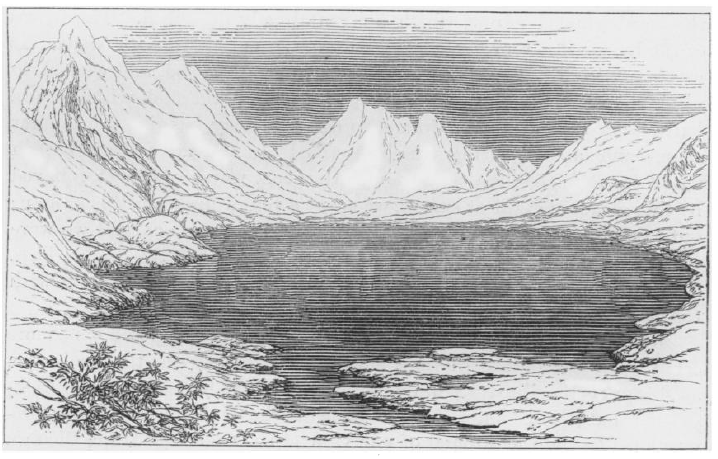
A sketch of Bitang Tso by Sir Richard Temple; Mount Gipmochi at the far end

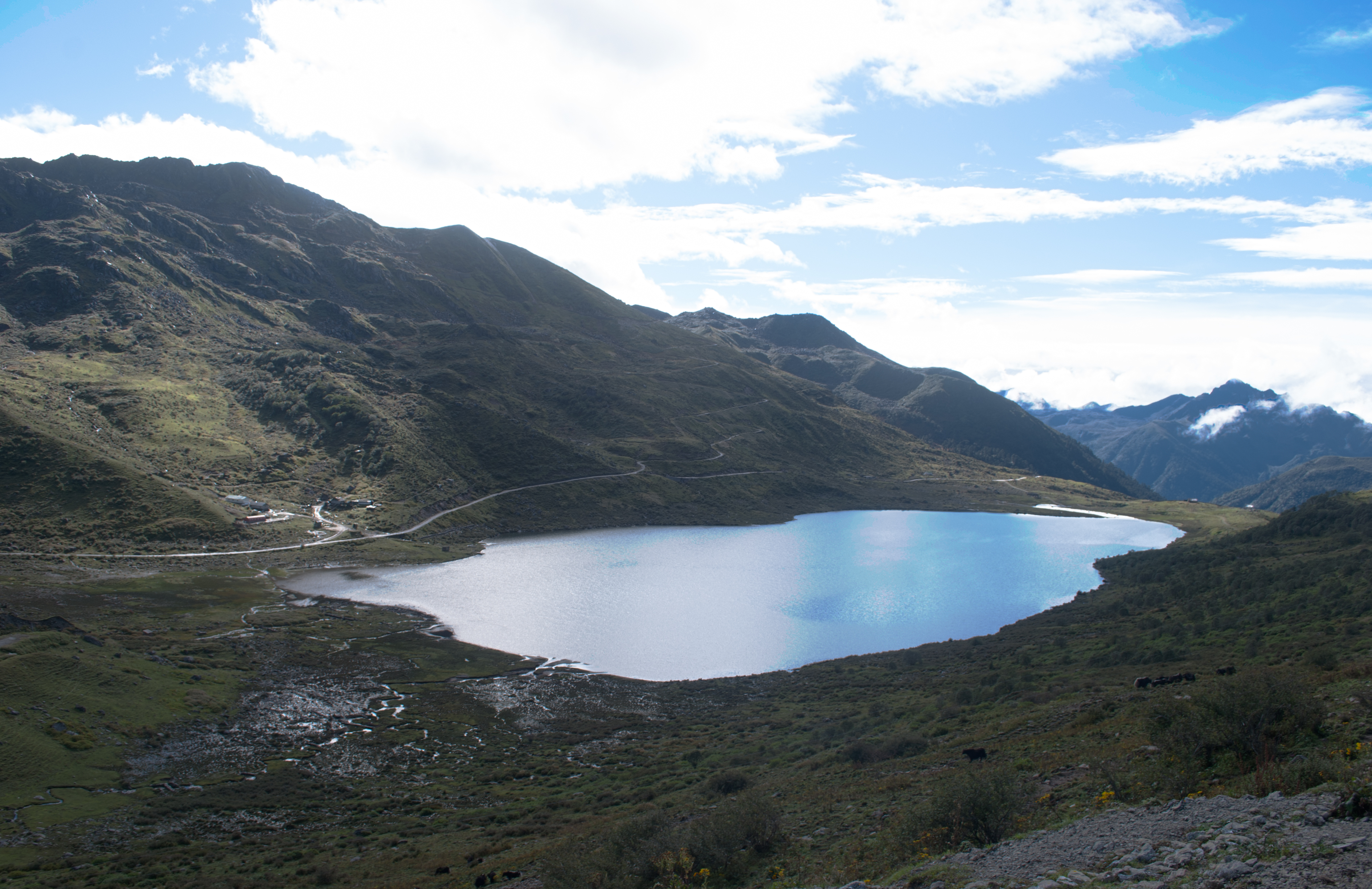
Contemporary photograph of Bitang Tso

Kupup lies in a transverse depression between the Dongkya Range that forms the border of Sikkim, and the mountains to the southwest. The Bitang Tso or Elephant Lake, a glacial lake that is regarded as the source of the Dichu river, is next to Kupup in the same depressioin. Kupup lies on the higher ground to the northwest of the Bitang Tso lake. Darjeeling superintendent J. W. Edgar, who surveyed the area for the construction of a road to Tibet in 1874, described Kupup as "a grassy and rather marshy valley". It was said that 1,500 men could encamp in the valley. Fuel and rhododendron scrub were plentiful in the locality. To the northeast of the valley is a steep hill called "Tent Hill", which rises to 1,000 ft. A stream flows down from the Jelep La pass and bends around the Tent Hill to the northwest, and drains into Menmecho Lake, which was described by Edgar as being especially beautiful. The river flowing from here is called Rangpo Chu, which is an upstream tributary of the Teesta River.

To the southeast of Kupup, the Bitang Tso is considered the source of the Dichu River, even though other streams flowing down from the Dongkya Range provide a greater volume of water. Dichu flows southeast until Mount Gipmochi on the western shoulder of the Doklam plateau, where it turns south and enters Bhutan.

The cart road to Jelep La on Sikkim–Tibet border, eventually laid by the British, ran on the watershed between Teesta and Dichu rivers. The watershed continues on to the moraine ridge above Bitang Tso. British explorers noted that, from here on, the road to Jelep La had a gentle ascent, which was no more than 1,000 feet (300 m) above.

== Current status ==
After the independence of India, a motorable road was constructed between Gangtok and Nathu La(up to Sherathang) during 1954–1958. The use of Jelep La was also continued, via the old British cart road as well as along the Nathu La road via Sherathang (8 km from Kupup).

Trade relations between India and China were suspended during the 1962 Sino-Indian War and the passes were closed. In 2006, Nathu La was reopened by mutual agreement. A motorable road along the old British alignment has been constructed between Kalimpong and Kupup, which continues on to Sherathang and Nathu La.

A second settlement of Kupup has grown up on the high ground above Bitang Tso, to support the Indian armed forces. A road to the Doka La pass near Mount Gipmochi, 5 km distant, runs from Kupup on the northeast side of the valley. During the 73-day Doklam standoff in 2017, Kupup formed a key link for the Indian military.

== Bibliography ==
- Blandford, William T. (1871), "Account of a visit to the eastern and northern frontiers of independent Sikkim, with notes on the zoology of the alpine and sub-alpine regions, Part I", Journal of the Asiatic Society of Bengal: 367–420
- Brown, Percy (1934), Townsend, Joan (ed.), Tours in Sikhim and the Darjeeling District (Revised ed.), Calcutta: W. Newman & Co – via archive.org
- Edgar, John Ware (1874), Report on a visit to Sikhim and the Thibetan frontier in October, November, and December, 1873, Calcutta: Bengal Secretariat Press – via archive.org
- O'Conner, W. F. (1900), Routes in Sikkim, Calcutta: Office of the Superintendent of Government Printing – via archive.org
- Steinmann, Brigitte (2004), "National Hegemonies, Local Allegiances: Historiography and ethnography of a Buddhist kingdom" (PDF), European Bulletin of Himalayan Research, 25/26: 145–167
- Temple, Richard (June 1881), "The Lake Region of Sikkim, on the Frontier of Tibet", Proceedings of the Royal Geographical Society and Monthly Record of Geography, 3 (6): 321–340, doi:10.2307/1800507, JSTOR 1800507
