= Takchang =

- Village
- Location in Sikkim, India Takchang (India)
- Coordinates: 27.216091°N 88.633833°E
- Country: India
- State: Sikkim
- District: Pakyong District
- Sub Division: Pakyong
- Founder: Takchangish

Government
  - Type: Democratic

Area
  - Total: 3 km^{2} (1.2 sq mi)
- Elevation: 1,246 m (4,088 ft)

Population
  - Total: 600 (Approx)
  - Density: 200/km^{2} (520/sq mi)

Languages
  - Official: Nepali, Bhutia, Lepcha
- Time zone: UTC+5:30 (IST)
- PIN: 737 133
- Vehicle registration: SK
- Nearest city: Pakyong
- Sex ratio: 978 ♂/♀
- Literacy: 82%
- Vidhan Sabha: Rhenock
- River: Ralong Khola

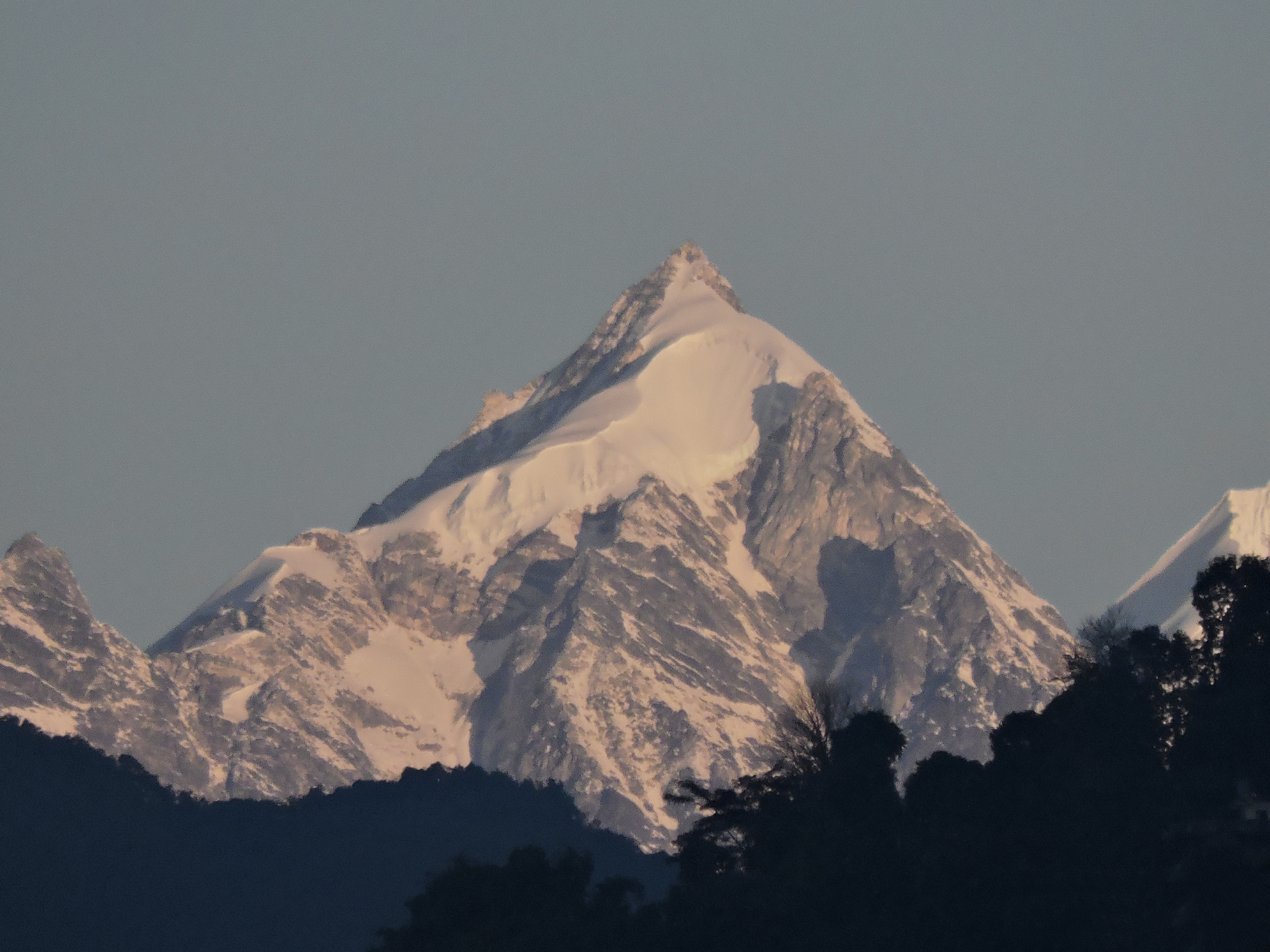
Narsing from Takchang

Takchang (Takshang) is a village near Pakyong in Pakyong District, India. Takchang is 30.7 km from Gangtok and the population of the village is nearly 550-600. Ethnic Nepali and Lepcha are the main settler of this village. Etymologically the word "Taktsong" is derived from Lepcha (Rong) language. The word tak means "Tiger" and tshong means "House", translating to "House of a Tiger".

== Geography ==
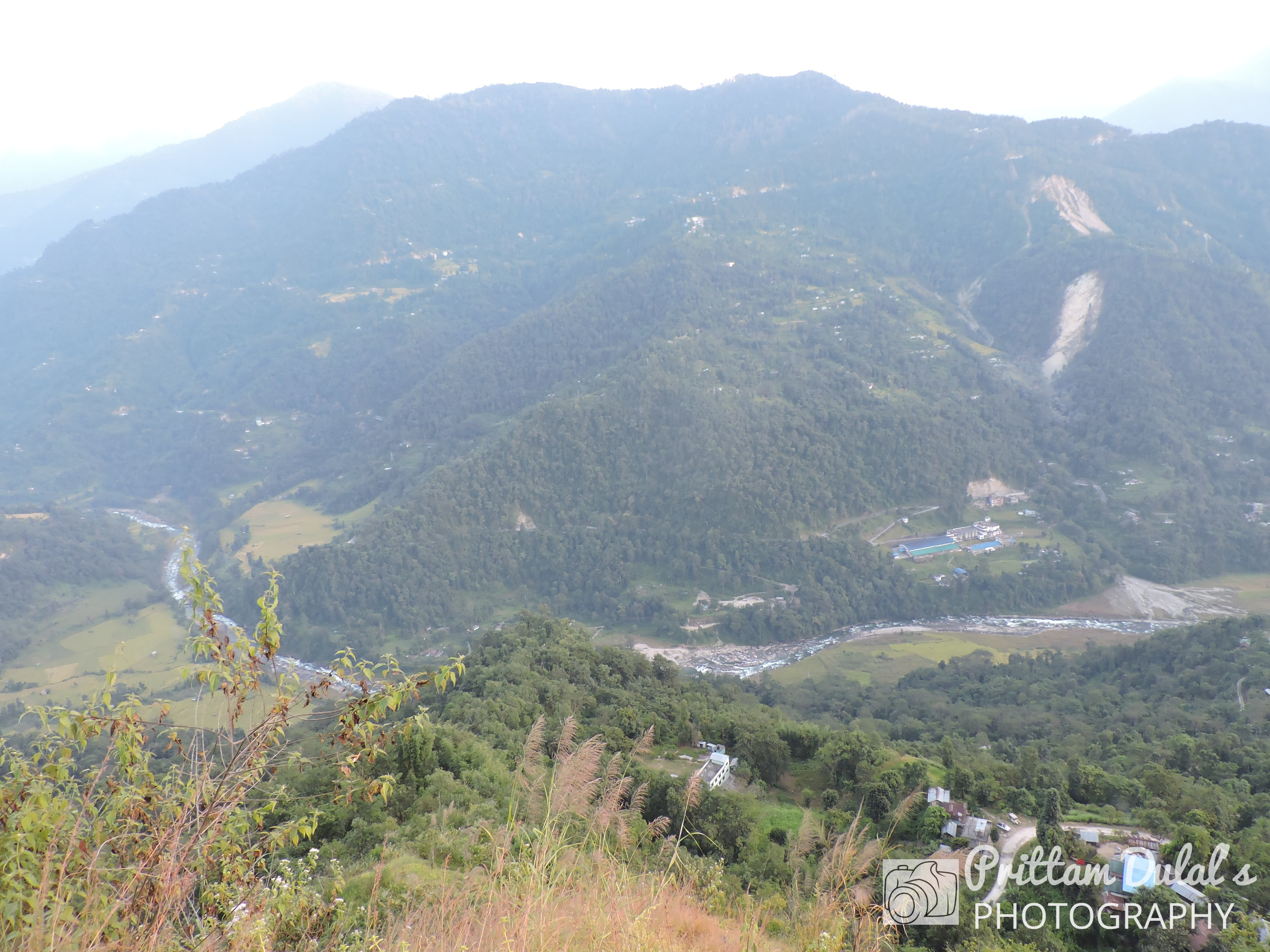
Path of Rangpo River as seen from Bandey Pokhrel View Point, Tareythang-Takchang, Pakyong District Sikkim

Takchang is located at 27.18°N 88.53°E. It is approximately 1246m above sea level.

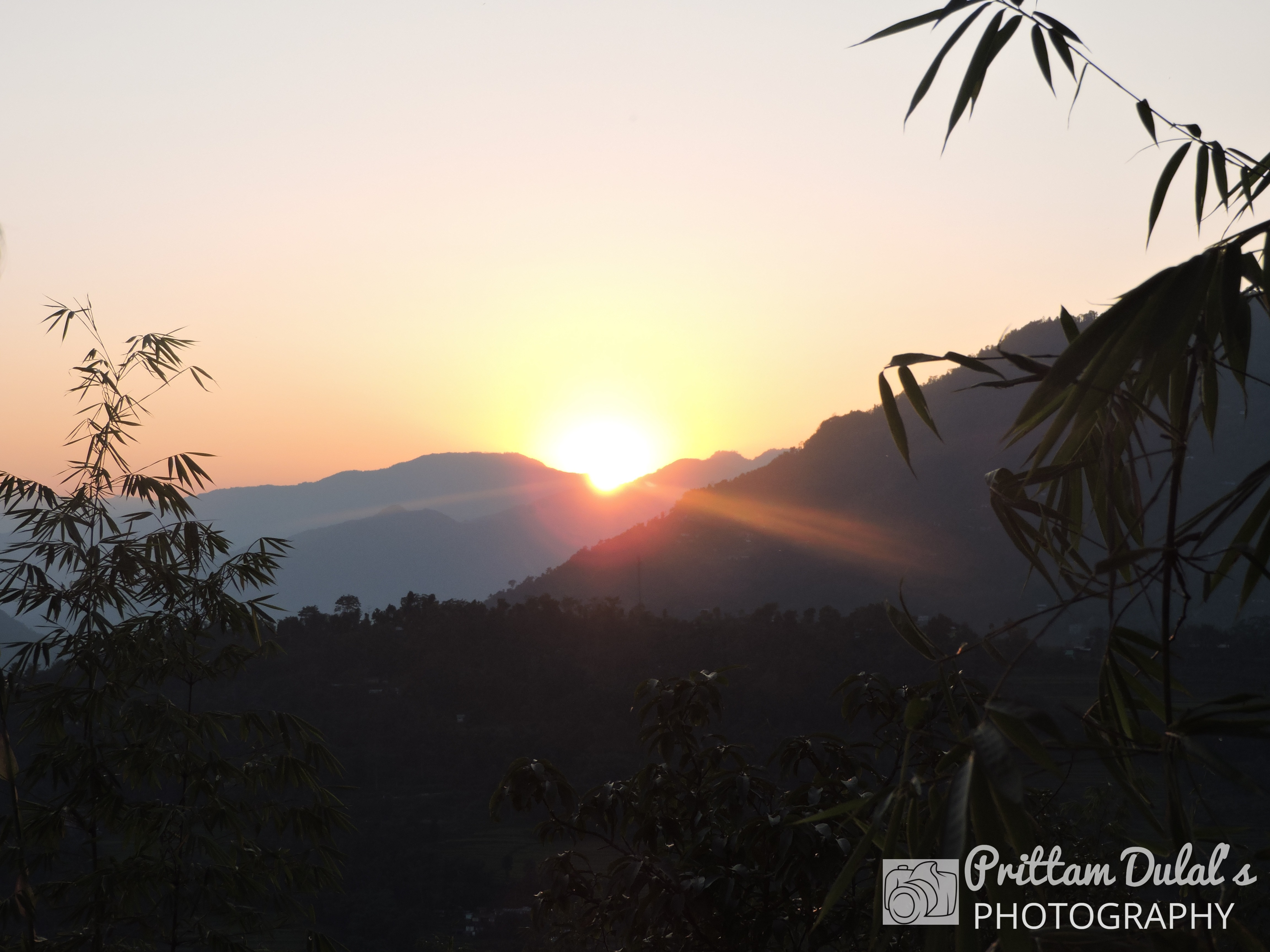
Takchang

== Folk tale related to Takchang ==
According to the folk fable and the aged citizen dwell in this village call "Bagh Khor"(बाघको खोर or बाघखोर ) in Nepali dialect (language) where there natives had to scared from the Tiger. The tome "Takchang Ko Ittehas"(ताकछाङको ईतिहास) written by Achut Sharma says that people used to find many tigers in early 17th century. Gradually people started saying the name of the village from Trooktsong to Taksong (टाक्सोङ) and nowadays it has come up to Takchang (ताकछाङ).

== Culture and mythology ==
People of different castes and creeds follow their own religions. Buddhism and Hinduism are the main religions but there are many sub religions (religious sects) are followed by the villagers. There are two temples; RAM Mandir & DURGA Mandir. A beautiful hill situated in the Northern part of Takchang called GUPHA DARA (गुफा डाडा) where believed that a monk had 3 years long subversive (underground) rumination as an ethnicity of Buddhism (Tibetan religion) in early 17th century. The encampment is sometimes used as a settlement by the Indian Army over there for 2/3 months. At present an attempt is made by Sagar Publication Takchang to establish a memorial forest (स्मृतिवन) where anyone can implant any type of sapling in the memory of their perished member of the ancestors.

== Demographics ==
People of different castes live in Takchang which consist of many sub castes and titles such as Neupane, Ghimire, Koirala, Bastola, Dulal, Dangal, Luitel, Rai, Lepcha (also called Róngkup), Chauhan, Thapa.

== Economy ==
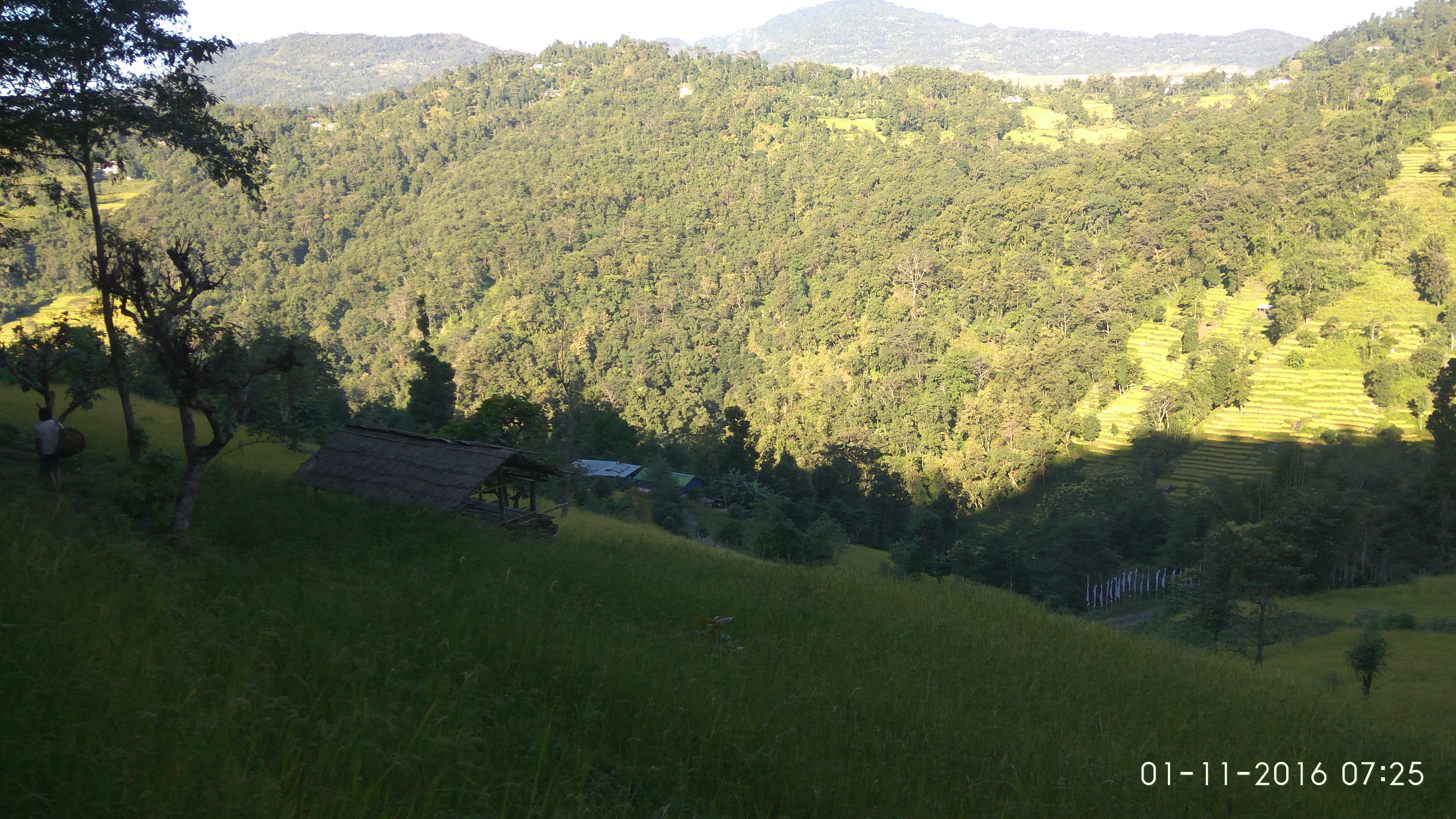
Paddyfield11

People are mainly engaged in primary sector like house farming, agriculture, pitty business, horticulture. Most of the youngsters are away from the village because of their job. Youngsters from the village are engaged work in the private and government sectors in the state capital Gangtok and some other states as well as abroad for their studies and job. There is a government school too in the middle of the village. Agriculture products include paddy (धान), maize (मकै), millet (कोदो), ginger (अदुवा), vegetables (सब्जी) and some cardamom (अलैची).
