= Tareythang =

Tareythang Tarethang
- Village
- Location in Sikkim, India Tareythang (India)
- Coordinates: 27.216°N 88.642°E
- Country: India
- State: Sikkim
- District: Pakyong District
- Elevation: 1,246 m (4,088 ft)

Languages
  - Official: Nepali, Bhutia, Lepcha, Limbu, Newari, Rai, Gurung, Mangar, Sherpa, Tamang and Sunwar
- Time zone: UTC+5:30 (IST)
- PIN: 737 106
- Vehicle registration: SK 07
- Nearest City: Pakyong
- Sex ratio: 989 ♂/♀
- Literacy: 84.78%
- Lok Sabha: Sikkim Constituency
- Vidhan Sabha constituency: Chujachen Assembly constituency
- Current Panchayats: Ms. Sabitra Sharma and Mr. Bhimlall Kafley.
- Nearest Town: Rorathang
- Climate: sub tropical to alpine (Köppen)

Tareythang (also spelled as Tarethang) is a village located in Pakyong sub division at the Pakyong District of Sikkim state in India. This village is about 1250 m above sea level with a sub-tropical climate. It is around 10 kilometers away from district headquarter Pakyong. In electoral roll of 2011, Tareythang comes under the Assembly Constituency of Chujachen.

== Etymology ==
The legends of the village says that the name Tareythang comes from two words 'Tarey' which means the Tarey Bhir and the word 'Thang' means the plain land. It means the plain land under Tarey bhir is called as Tareythang.

== Population composition ==
Nepali-speaking people comprising Bahun, Chettri, Darjee and Sunar constitutes the majority of the population at Tareythang.

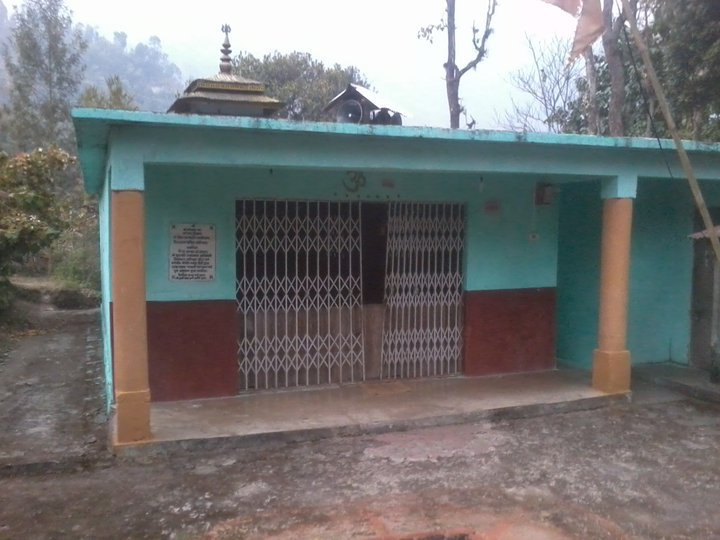
Tarkeshwar Shivalaya Mandir, Tareythang, Pakyong district Sikkim

== Economy ==
People are mainly engaged in primary sector like house farming, Agriculture, pitty business, Horticulture, diary etc. People engaged in agriculture produce as their main crops every year is Paddy (Dhaan), Maize (Makkai), Broom Plant (Kuccho), millet (Kodho), Ginger (Adhuwa), vegetables products & less quantity of cardamom (Aalinchi).

From 2013 onwards, Most locals are engaged in Diary Business. There are different Milk collection centre around Tareythang like Lower Tareythang Diary cum Milk Collection Centre, Tareythang Multipurpose Co-operative Society, which collects a good amount of milk on a daily basis and supplies to Sikkim Milk Union Limited, Gangtok, thus providing a good source of income for the dairy farmers of Tareythang.

There are also Consumer Service Points (CSP) of different banks in Tareythang like State Bank of India (SBI), Sikkim State Cooperative Bank Limited (SISCO) etc providing consumers with Banking Facilities around the village.

== Geography ==
As per the report of Sikkim Statistical Journal, published from Department of Economics, Statistics, Monitoring & Evaluation, Government of Sikkim, Tareythang has a total area of 223.17 Hactare and is located at an average elevation of 333 metres (1093 feet). Rangpo River flows below the village.

== Transport ==
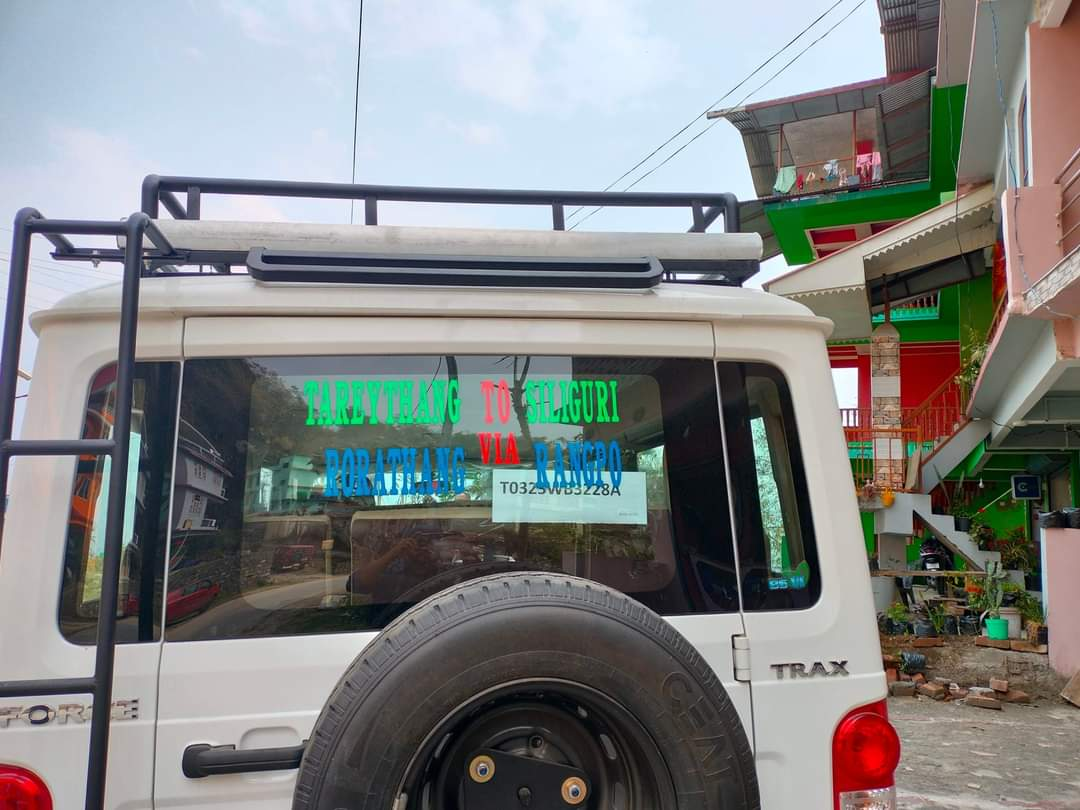
Tareythang to Siliguri Daily Jeep Service

Taxis/Jeep services access the towns and cities like Gangtok, Siliguri, Pakyong, Singtam, Rangpo, Majitar, Rorathang, Rhenock, Ranipool, Kumrek, Melli, Sevoke and Rongli from the village.

== Education ==
Government Secondary School Tareythang, Government Primary School Kapurpathey and Sanskrit Paathsaala Tareythang are the important educational institutes in the middle of the village. There is also one important Library in Tareythang which is called Tareythang Saraswati Pustakalaya.There is also one Public Gym called Lunatic Fring Brainsickers Gym, at Tareythang. Most of the youngsters are away from the village because of their job. Youngsters from the village are engaged in Private & Govt. sector in Capital city Gangtok and some other states as well as abroad for their studies & job.

== Healthcare ==
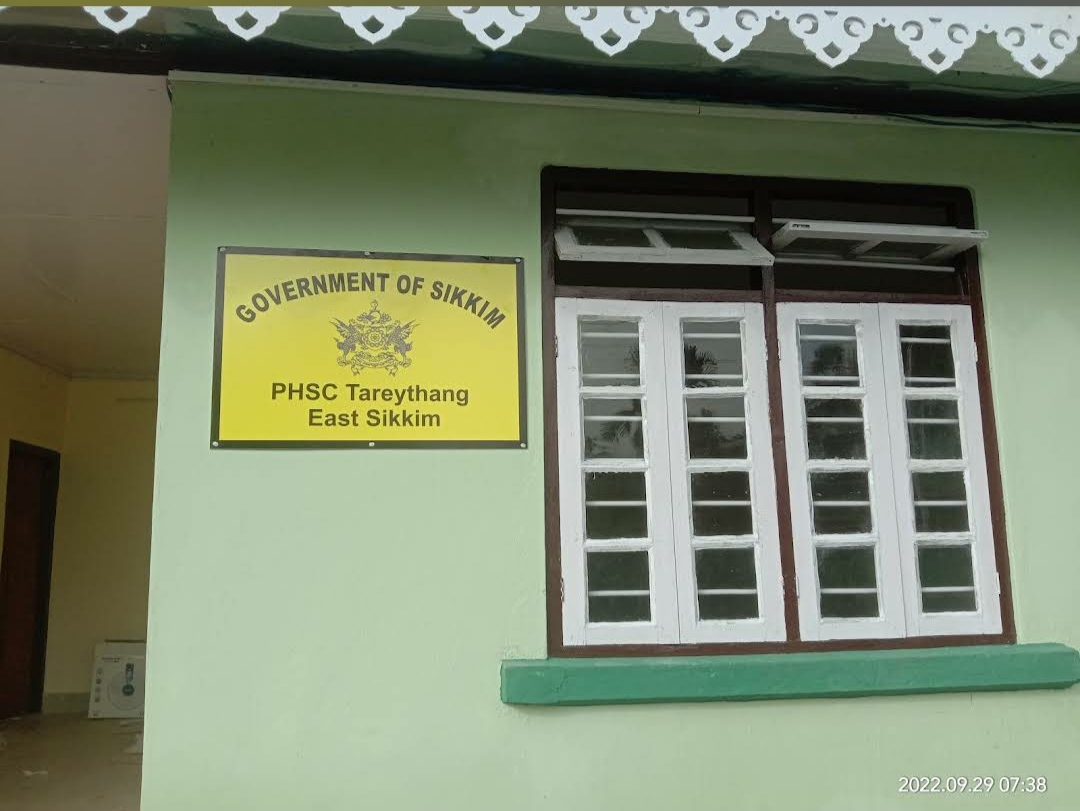
Primary Health Sub Centre in Tareythang

There is one Primary Health Sub Centre providing some basic healthcare services in Tareythang. It is operated by Government of Sikkim. The nearest advanced Healthcare Providers are STNM Gangtok, CRH Tadong, and Pakyong PHC.

== Demographics ==
As of the 2011 Census of India, Tareythang had a total 161 households and a population of 736. Male population was 370, while female population was 366. It has an average literacy rate of 84.78%, higher than the state average of 81.42%: male literacy is 93.43%, and female literacy is 75.78%.

== Sex ratio ==
In Tareythang village population of children with age 0-6 is 79 which makes up 10.73% of total population of village. Average Sex Ratio of Tareythang village is 989 which is higher than Sikkim state average of 890. Child Sex Ratio for the Tareythang as per census is 1257, higher than Sikkim average of 957.

== Tareythang data ==
According to the 2011 Census, Tareythang data are as under:

Particulars	Total	Male	Female
1. Total No. of Houses	161		
2. Population	736	370	366
3. Child (0-6)	79	35	44
4. Schedule Caste	96	49	47
5. Schedule Tribe	7	5	2
6. Literacy	84.78 %	93.43 %	75.78 %
7. Total Workers	361	207	154
8. Main Worker	246	0	0
9. Marginal Worker	115	33	82

== Caste wise data of the village ==
As per 2011 census, Schedule Caste (SC) constitutes 13.04% while Schedule Tribe (ST) were 0.95% of total population in Tareythang village.

== Work profile of the village ==
As per official census data of 2011, in Tareythang out of total population of 736, 361 were engaged in work activities. 68.14% of workers describe their work as Main Work (Employment or Earning more than 6 Months) while 31.86% were involved in Marginal activity providing livelihood for less than 6 months. Of 361 workers engaged in Main Work, 121 were cultivators (owner or co-owner) while 32 were Agricultural labourer.

== Notable people ==
- Trilochan Pokhrel, Sikkimese freedom fighter.
- Raju Kafley, Film Director

== Attractions ==
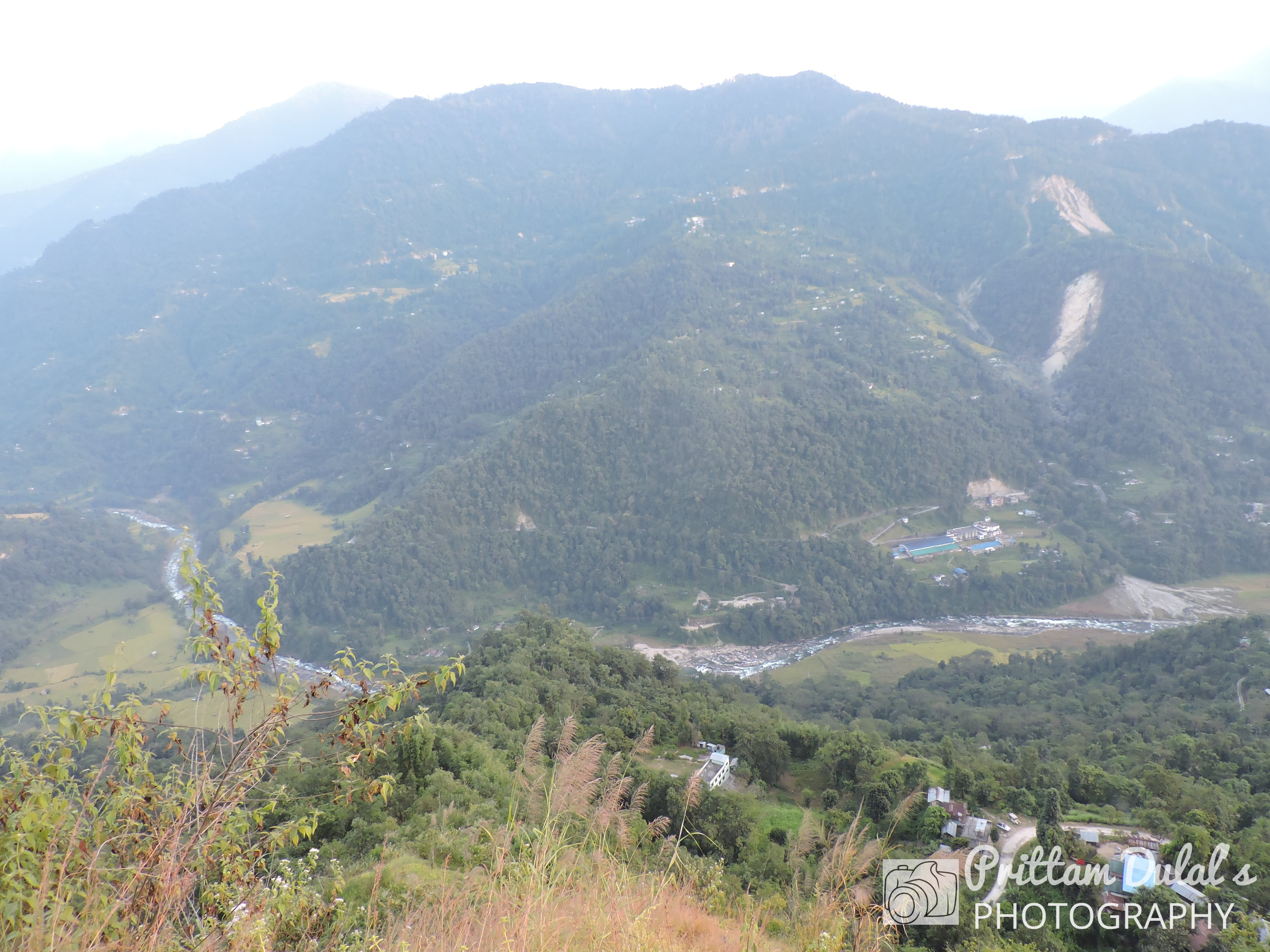
Path of Rangpo River as seen from Bandey Pokhrel View Point, Tareythang-Takchang, Pakyong District Sikkim

Attractions in and around Tareythang are as follows:

- Tarkeshwar Shivalaya Mandir, Tareythang
- Banday Pokhrel View Point.
- Indreni Waterfalls.
- Donok Khola Waterfalls.
- Donok Biyasi (Beautiful Agricultural Farmland) in Lower Tareythang
- Tareythang Saraswati Pustakalaya.
- Rangpo Khola in Lower Tareythang. Etc.
