= Pacheykhani =

- Village
- Location of Pacheykhani
- Coordinates: 27°12′38″N 88°36′10″E
- Country: India
- District: Pakyong District
- State: Sikkim

Area
  - Total: 1.6282 km^{2} (0.6287 sq mi)
- Elevation: 1,018 m (3,340 ft)

Population (2011)
  - Total: 2,264
  - Density: 1,390/km^{2} (3,601/sq mi)
  - Females: 1,100
  - males: 1,164
- Time zone: UTC+5:30 (IST)
- Pin Code: 737106

Pacheykhani is a village located in National Highway 717A, Pakyong tehsil of Pakyong District in Sikkim, India. It is situated 7 kilometres (4.3 mi) from the district headquarters at Pakyong and 37 kilometres (23 mi) from the state capital Gangtok. The 2011 Census of India recorded it as having a population of 2264 of which 1164 were male and 1100 were female. According to the census 2011 the village code of Pacheykhani is 261340. The total geographical area of the village is 162.82 hectares (402.3 acres) . As per 2019 stats, Pacheykhani villages comes under Rhenock assembly & Sikkim parliamentary constituency. Rorathang is nearest town to Pacheykhani which is approximately 09 kilometres (5.6 mi) away.
