= Trilochan Pokhrel =

Indian freedom fighter

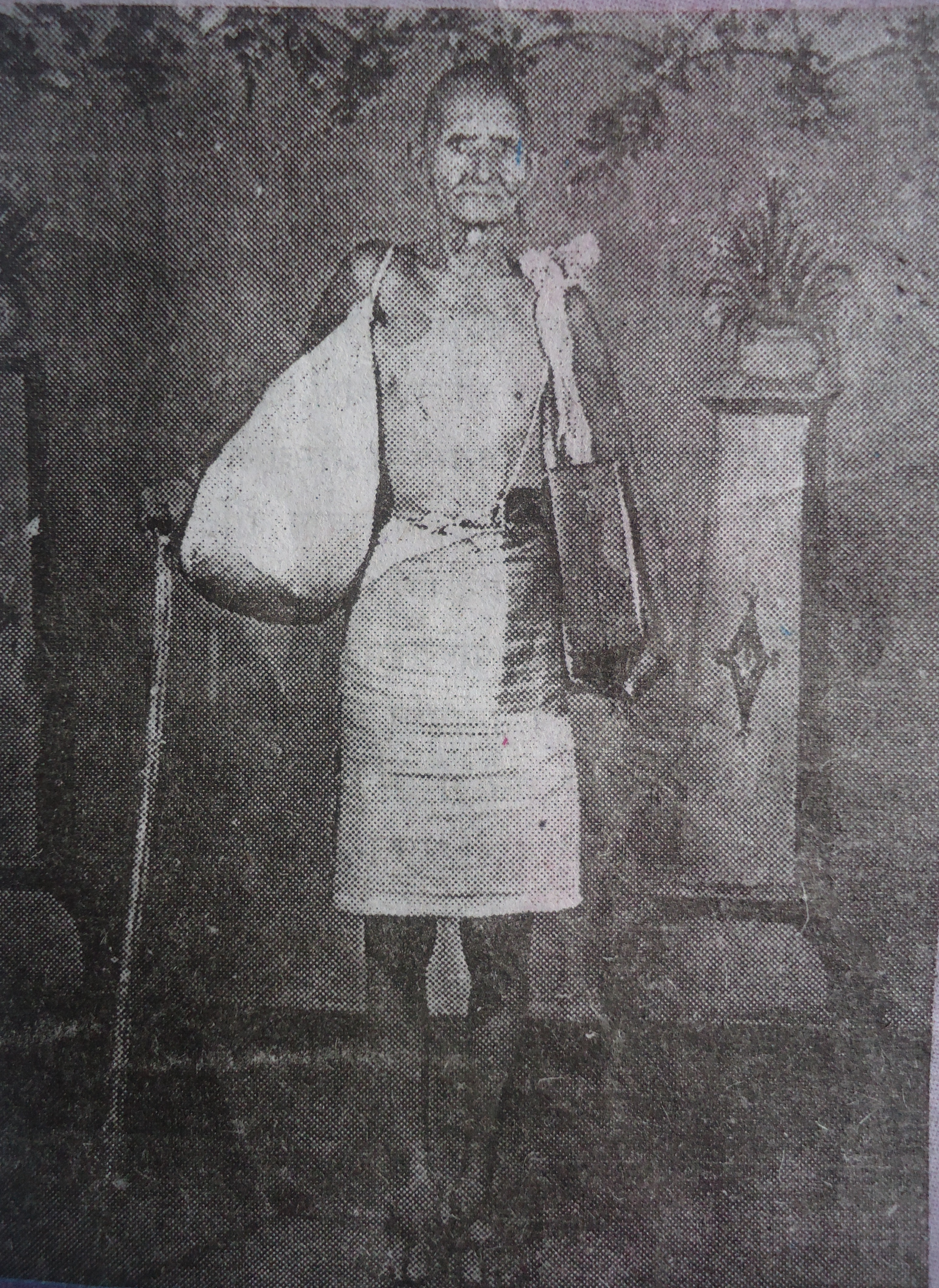
- Trilochan Pokhrel
- Born: Tareythang, Kingdom of Sikkim
- Died: 27 January 1969; Purnia district, Bihar, India
- Known for: Prominent Figure of Indian independence movement activism in North Bengal and Sikkim
- Title: Bandey Pokhrel/ Gandhi Pokhrel
- Parents: Bhadralal Pokhrel (father); Januka Pokhrel (mother)

Trilochan Pokhrel (died 1969) was the first Indian independence activist from Sikkim. In Sikkim and North Bengal, Pokhrel is popularly called 'Bandey Pokhrel'. or Gandhi Pokhrel.

== Early life ==
Pokhrel was born at Tareythang in East Sikkim (present day Pakyong District) in a Nepalis Brahmin family. Trilochan Pokhrel was highly influenced by the movements of Mahatma Gandhi, which were based on the fundamental principles of peace and non-violence. He was actively involved in Gandhi's movements, such as the Non-Cooperation Movement, the Civil Disobedience Movement and the Quit India Movement. Mr. Pokherl had immense faith in the teaching of simple life led by Mahatma Gandhi. Pokhrel is known for propagating the concept of Swadeshi among the Sikkimese peasantry. Late Pokhrel was the first Sikkimese freedom fighter who fought against British hegemony. Actually, Sikkim was a protectorate state of the British. In the year 1861, the signature of the Treaty of Tumlong effectively made Sikkim a de facto protectorate of British India. This had a huge impact on Sikkim's Sovereignty. The appointment of John Claude White, a Political officer established new landholdings in Sikkim. Direct or Indirect influence of Britishers in Sikkim made Trilochan Pokhrel join the mainstream Indian Freedom Moment.

== Honours ==
- 2018 - LD Kazi Award for Democratic Movement by Government of Sikkim(Posthumous)
