= Bering, Sikkim =

Bering Biring
- Village
- Location in Sikkim, India
- Coordinates: 27.219°N 88.665°E
- Country: India
- State: Sikkim
- District: Pakyong District
- Elevation: 1,246 m (4,088 ft)

Languages
  - Official: Nepali, Bhutia, Lepcha, Limbu, Newari, Rai, Gurung, Mangar, Sherpa, Tamang and Sunwar
- Time zone: UTC+5:30 (IST)
- PIN: 737 106
- Vehicle registration: SK
- Nearest city: Pakyong
- Sex ratio: 970 ♂/♀
- Literacy: 82%
- Vidhan Sabha constituency: CHUJACHEN
- Current Panchayats: Ms Samjhana Pradhan, Ms Sushma Limboo and Mr Dhan Bahadur Chettri.
- Climate: sub tropical to alpine (Köppen)

Bering or Biring is a small village at Pakyong sub-division in the Pakyong District of Sikkim. It is 13 km away towards east from Pakyong Market. This small village is inhabited by Sharma, Chettri, Limboo, Rai communities. In the lower belt Sharma are in majority - Ghimire, Bastola, Bhattarai, Thapa, Kharka, Budathoki, Gotamey, Bogoti Khatiwara etc. are among the subcaste living in this area. Agriculture is the main occupation of the people of this area. Ginger, Amliso, are the main cash crop of this area. Paddy, maize, Millet, wheat are the cereal crop. Nearest town from this village is Pakyong in west and Rongli in east. This village falls under Pakyong Block development Office.

== Etymology ==
The name Biring has multiple definitions. Some say that it's a corrupted version of Bu ring, a Bhutia word where bu stands for snake and ring stands for long. Others disagree. They believe Biring is a Lepcha word which means "full of bamboo", as this area was once densely packed with bamboo groves. Some would disagree with both such versions and argue that Biring is a Nepali word, but what it means is unknown.

== Population ==
The population of this village is 1,006 (male: 521, female: 485) with a total of 189 households according to the 2011 Census of India. The village code is 42300.

== Literacy ==
Bering village has lower literacy rate compared to Sikkim. In 2011, the literacy rate of Bering village was 77.33% compared to 81.42% of Sikkim. In Bering Male literacy stands at 87.22% while female literacy rate was 66.61%.

== Sex Ratio ==
In Bering village population of children with age 0-6 is 118 which makes up 8.93% of total population of the village. Average Sex Ratio of Bering village is 897 which is higher than Sikkim state average of 890. Child Sex Ratio for the Bering as per census is 662, lower than Sikkim average of 957.

== Caste Wise data of the Village ==
As per 2011 census, Bering village of East Sikkim has a substantial population of Schedule Tribe (ST). Schedule Tribe (ST) constitutes 28.44% while Schedule Caste (SC) were 7.79% of total population in Bering village.

== Work Profile of the Village ==
As per official census data of 2011, at Bering village out of total population, 886 were engaged in work activities. 74.49% of workers describe their work as Main Work (Employment or Earning more than 6 Months) while 25.51% were involved in Marginal activity providing livelihood for less than 6 months. Of 886 workers engaged in Main Work, 477 were cultivators (owner or co-owner) while 56 were Agricultural labourer.

== Recent Infrastructural Development ==
Recently Gati Power project entered into this village to generate hydro electricity. Rangpo and Rongli are two main river providing many ways of livelihood to the people of this area.
