= Rangpo River =

Coordinates: 27.1920°N 88.6028°E

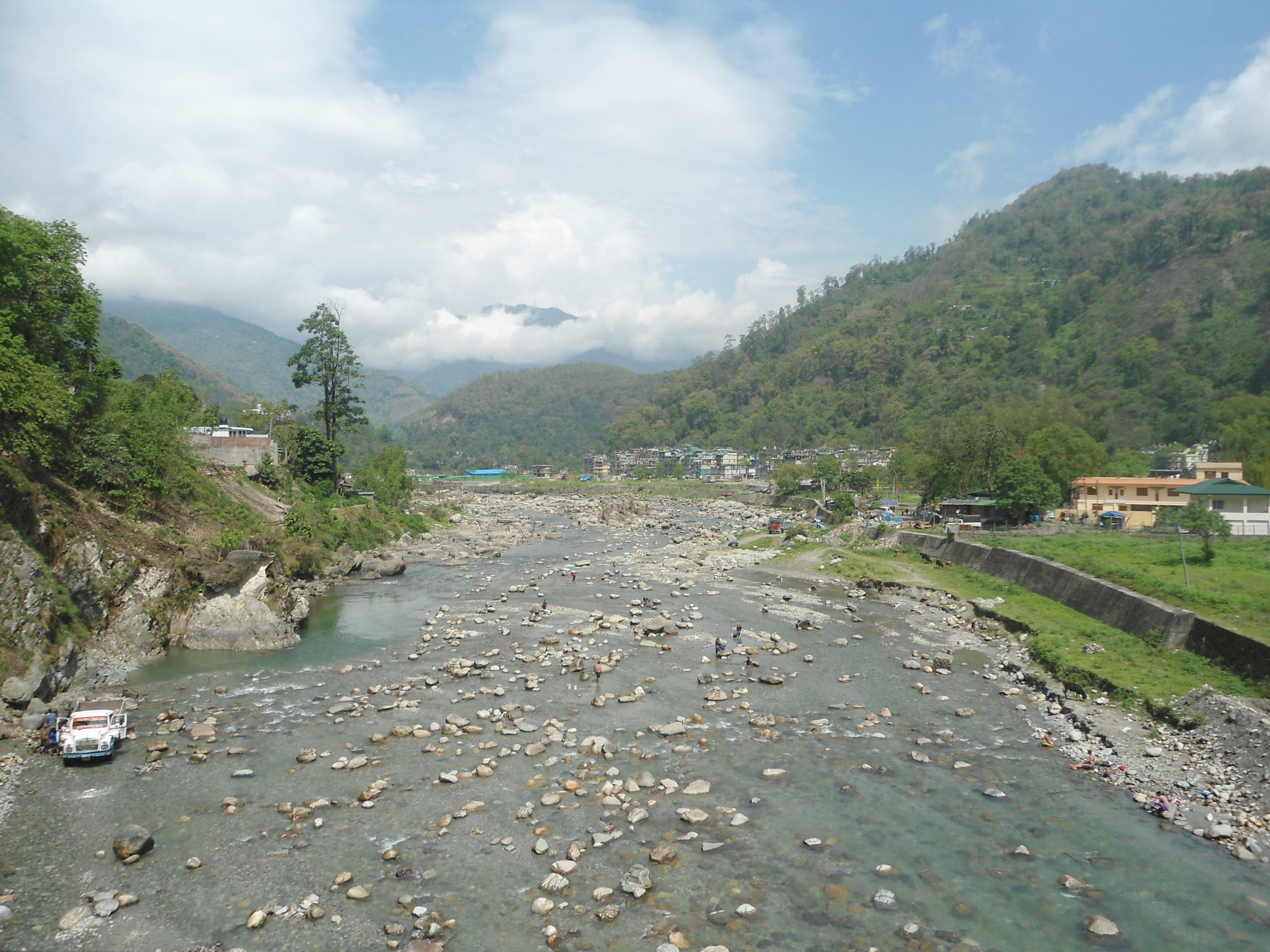
- Rangpo River during dry season.

Location
- Country: India
- State: Sikkim; West Bengal
- Important Bridges: Atal Setu Bridge; Rorathang Bridge; Rongli Bridge; Gati Bridge
- District: Pakyong district; Kalimpong district
- Towns/Cities: Rongli; Rorathang; Kumrek; Rangpo.

Physical characteristics
- Source: Menmecho Lake
  - location: Menmecho Lake, above Dzuluk, Gangtok district, Sikkim, India
- Mouth: Teesta River
  - location: Rangpo Doban, Rangpo Pakyong District, Sikkim, India

Basin features
- Tributaries
  - left: Reshi Khola; Rongli Khola; Pool Khola; Khaarey Khola etc.
  - right: Richu Khola; Donok Khola; Ralong Khola; Pachey Khola; Kumrek Khola etc.

River Rangpo is a river in the Indian state of Sikkim. A major tributary of the Teesta River, it originates from Menmecho Lake near Dzuluk and flows through Rongli and Pakyong subdivision villages in Pakyong District towards Rorathang, Kumrek and Rangpo. The river demarcates the border between Pakyong District of Sikkim and Kalimpong district of West Bengal from Rorathang to Rangpo. At the town of Rangpo, the river joins river Teesta. The Rangpo is the third largest river of Sikkim after Teesta and Rangeet. Atal Setu Bridge the longest roadway bridge of Sikkim is over River Rangpo, which connects Rangpo Forest Village in West Bengal with Rangpo Town in Sikkim

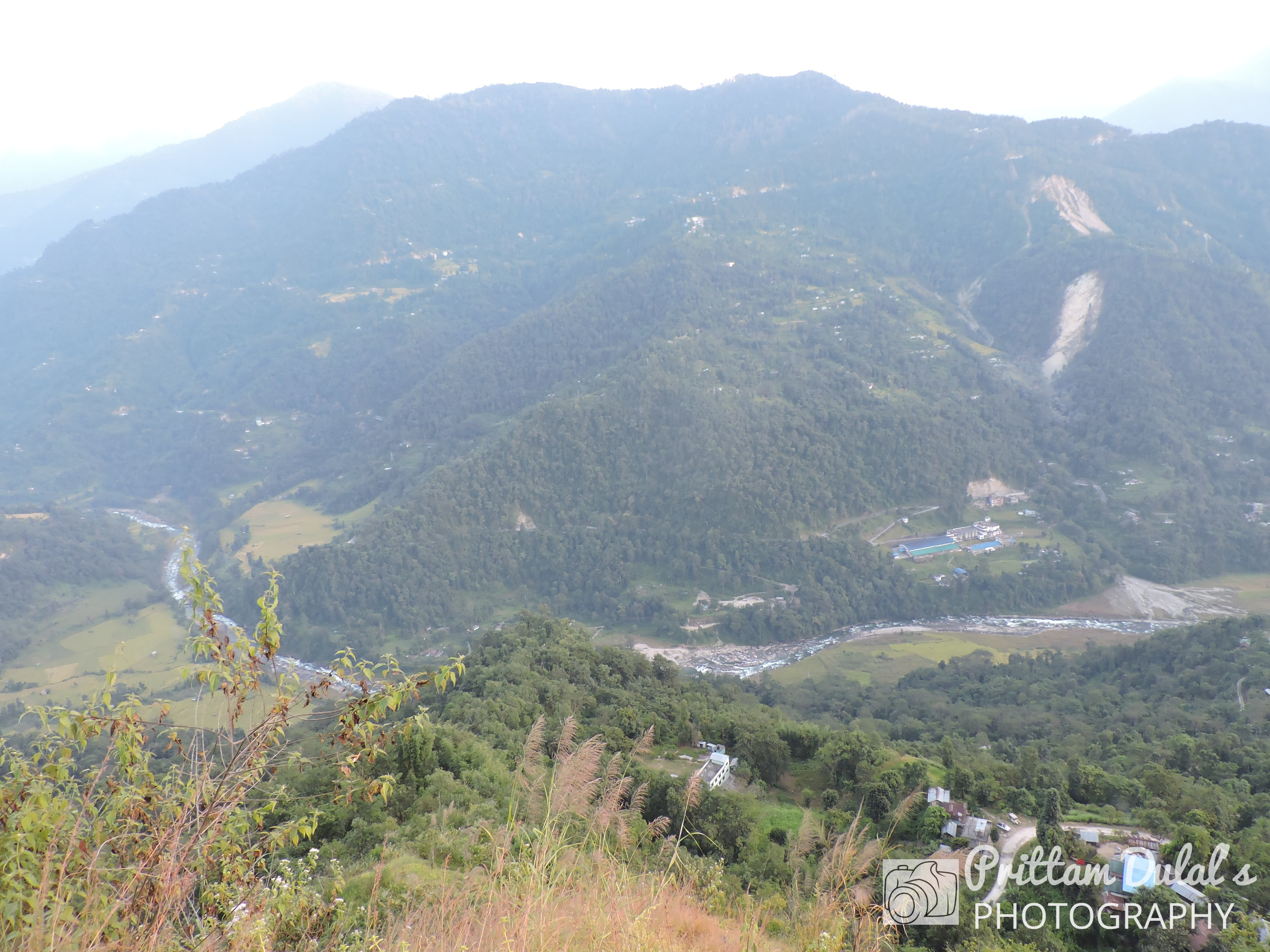
Path of River Rangpo as seen from Bandey Pokhrel View Point,Tareythang, Pakyong District Sikkim

The river runs through Pakyong District of Sikkim and a few parts of the Kalimpong District of West Bengal. This tributary flows mainly from east to west with a variable channel pattern including braided, meandering, straight, gorge and blocked lake. Landslides are very common along the river bank as cliff-like bedrocks are significantly exposed along the river valley wall.

During Monsoon season, especially from June to September, the volume of water in the river and its tributaries rises heavily due to continuous rainfall in the region.

The important towns along the route of this river are Rangpo, Rorathang, Rongli, Kumrek etc in Pakyong District of Sikkim.

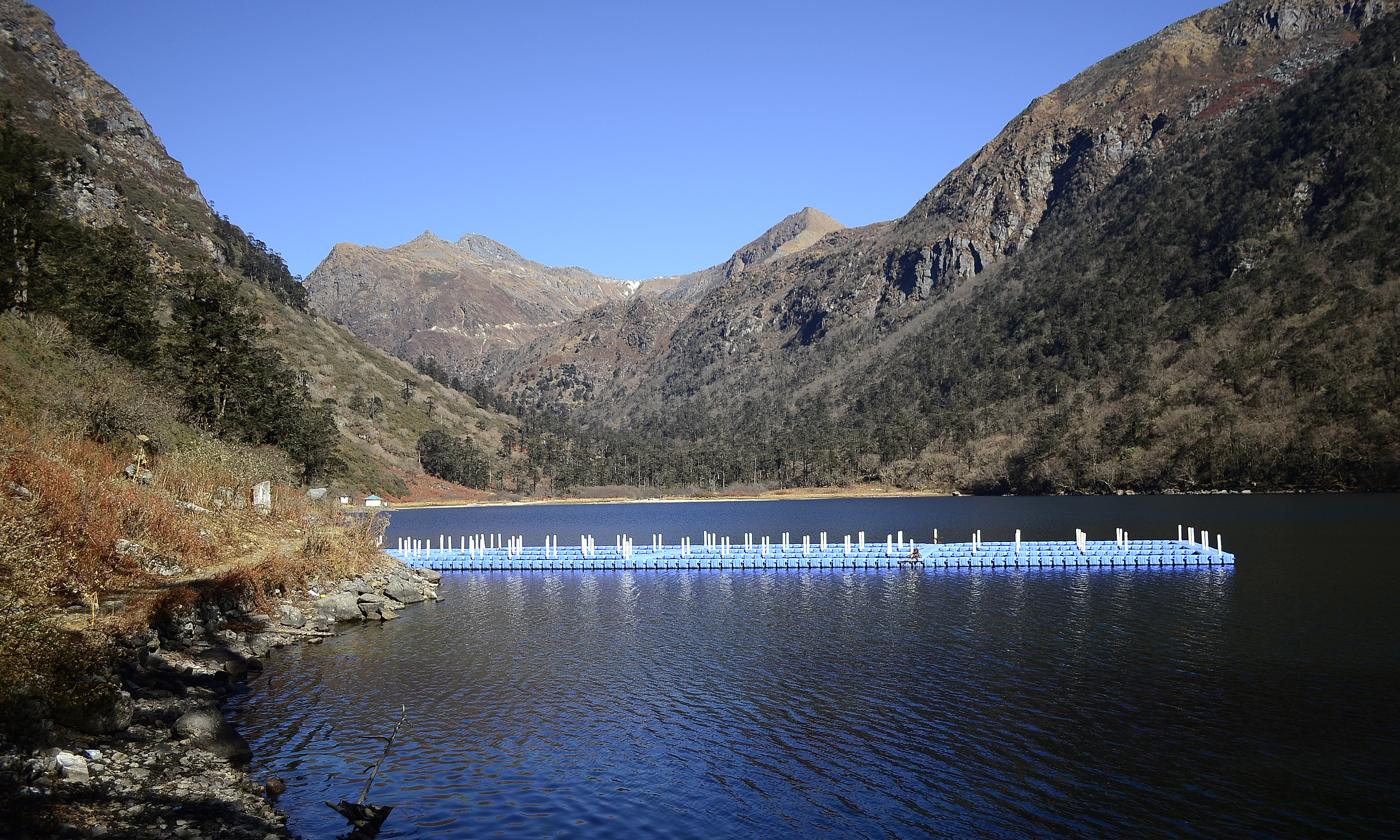
Menmecho Lake, the source of River Rangpo

Its confluence with Teesta River is immediately downstream of Rangpo town, the confluence point is known as Rangpo Doban.

At the town of Rangpo, there is a bridge across River Rangpo, the bridge is called Atal Setu Bridge or Rangpo Bridge.

== Course ==
The river originates from Lake Menmecho near Dzuluk in Gangtok district of Sikkim. It flows down towards the villages of Pakyong District like Latuk, Rolep, Losing, Chochenpheri, Chujachen and reaches the town of Rongli, where it is joined by a river called Rongli Khola. It further flows through villages of Sudunglakha, Mulukay, Bering, Tareythang, Tarpin where the river is fed my many tributaries like River Richu, River Donok, River Ralang, River Pachey, River Khaarey and it reaches the town of Rorathang, where it is joined by one of its largest tributary- Reshi River. From here the river forms border between Pakyong District of Sikkim and Kalimpong District of West Bengal, flowing through villages like Bhasmay, Kashyong, Kumrek, Lower Mansong, Chanatar etc and other small rivers like Kumrek Khola, Pool Khola, etc., join in and the river finally reaches the town of Rangpo, where it joins river Teesta.

== Hydropower Project ==
- A 110 MW Gati Hydropower Project lies on river Rangpo, The project site is between the town of Rorathang and Rongli of Pakyong District in Sikkim.
- A 96 MW Madhya Bharat Power Corporation Project Power house lies in Kumrek on the right bank of River Rangpo.
