= Mining Cricket Stadium =

Cricket stadium in Rangpo, Sikkim, India

Sikkim Cricket Ground
- Interactive map of Sikkim Cricket Ground
- Full name: Sikkim Cricket Ground
- Location: Rangpo, Pakyong District
- Coordinates: 27.1800°N 88.5124°E
- Owner: Sikkim Cricket Association
- Operator: Sikkim Cricket Association
- Capacity: 17,500

Construction
- Built: 1997

Tenant
- Sikkim cricket team

Sikkim Cricket Ground is a cricket stadium in Rangpo, Pakyong District, Sikkim. It is the official cricket ground of Sikkim that has been leased to Sikkim Cricket Association in 2002 for 20 years by Government of Sikkim. The ground was established in 1997 when a match of Vijay Merchant Trophy was played between Sikkim Under-16s and Bihar Under-16s. Previously, the ground belonged to Sikkim Mining Corporation and was handed over to the Sikkim Cricket Association in 2002 to be developed as a cricket stadium. As of 2022, the Stadium is fully functional and Mining Cricket Stadium will host three Ranji Trophy matches, three CK Nayudu Trophy matches and two Cooch Behar Trophy matches in November - December 2022.
