= Atal Setu, Sikkim =

Bridge in Sikkim, India

Atal Setu Bridge
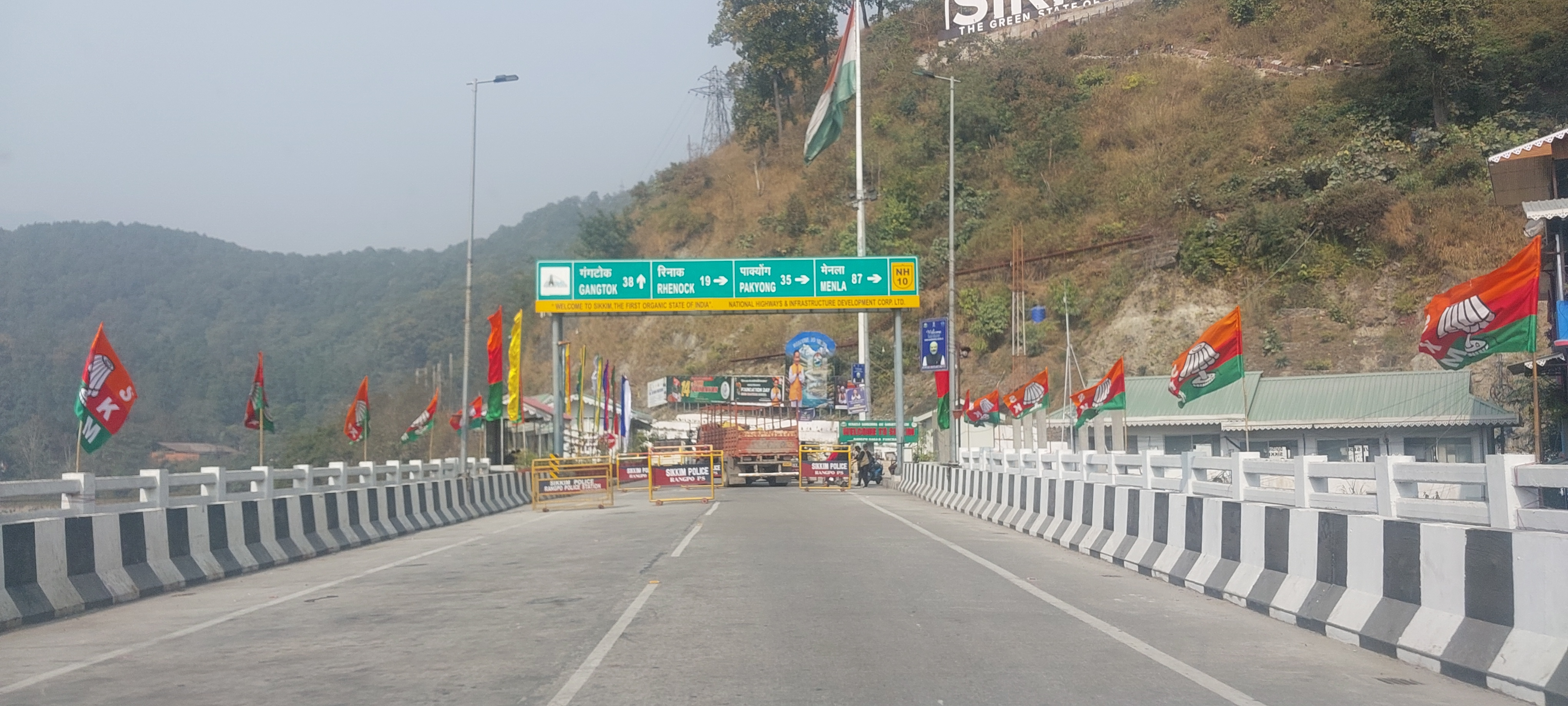
- Coordinates: 27.1761°N 88.5287°E
- Locale: Rangpo, Pakyong district, Sikkim, India

Characteristics
- Total length: 1123 m (3684 ft)

Location
- Interactive map of Atal Setu Bridge

Atal Setu Bridge is a two-lane road bridge on National Highway 10 at Rangpo, Pakyong district, Sikkim. It spans across the deep Rangpo River valley and connecting Sikkim with West Bengal. The Atal Setu project comprises a viaduct and its approach roads, with a total length of about 1.123 km (including approach roads. The main viaduct portion is 826m in length. It was constructed by the National Highways and Infrastructure Development Corporation Limited (NHIDCL) at a cost of approximately ₹133.49 crore. The bridge was officially inaugurated on 4 November 2022 by President of India, Droupadi Murmu. Inauguration of the Atal Setu was part of a series of development project unveilings by the President in Sikkim during her visit. The bridge improves the travel along NH-10 by bypassing older, narrower road alignments in Rangpo. The 14.8-metre-wide deck accommodates safe two-way traffic flow and pedestrian paths. Since it is designed as a viaduct, its deck is supported on piers erected in the valley, allowing it to traverse rugged terrain with minimal grade changes. The viaduct is constructed from Prestressed concrete segments to withstand Sikkim’s harsh environment (including heavy monsoon rains and seismic activity). It has 18 modular spans that are bonded together for strength and flexibility. The continuous-span design and robust construction meet Indian highway standards for seismic Zone V (since Sikkim lies in the high-seismic Himalayas), ensuring the bridge’s earthquake resistance. Overall, Atal Setu is among the longest roadway bridges in the state and is often referred to locally as the Rangpo Viaduct (sometimes “Rangpo IBM Bridge”).

== Structure and Design ==
The Atal Setu is a multi-span viaduct bridge built on the National Highway 10 corridor near the Sikkim–West Bengal border. The structure’s total project length is 1.123 km. Of this, 826 m form the elevated viaduct over the valley, and the remainder are graded approach roads on either end of the viaduct. The bridge deck is approximately 14.8 metres wide, carrying two traffic lanes (one per direction) and pedestrian footpaths on each side. The deck is supported on a series of prestressed-concrete pier bents anchored to the valley floor. The design employs an “integral” construction approach (sometimes described as a continuous viaduct), meaning the precast segments (modules) of the deck are joined end-to-end without expansion joints in the main span. This continuous modular design enhances structural integrity and provides flexibility to absorb seismic forces.

No detailed public schematics have been released, but official descriptions indicate that Atal Setu uses modern highway-bridge engineering practices. It was built in Engineering, Procurement and Construction (EPC) mode by National Highways and Infrastructure Development Corporation Limited (NHIDCL). This bridge constructed on Viaduct Engineering concept has 18 modules (slabs) glued to one another from either side making it tensile enough for the 8–9 Richter scale tremors possible in this region. The only crossing near Rangpo of comparable scale, Atal Setu replaced the previous traffic route that had bottlenecks, and it now provides an uninterrupted elevated path for NH-10 traffic.

== Construction Timeline ==
Planning for the Rangpo viaduct began in 2015 as part of the development of NH-10 (the Siliguri–Gangtok highway). The project was tendered and awarded around late 2016. According to NHIDCL records, the Rangpo Viaduct (Atal Setu) project was designated NHIDCL Package 31A/10 and was formally started on 16 December 2016. The contract was assigned to Dineshchandra R. Agrawal Infracon with an original completion date of 20 February 2020.Work proceeded with initial tasks such as piling, pier construction and assembling of a launching gantry for the deck segments. However, the project did not finish by the original target. Completion was delayed, in part due to the challenging Himalayan terrain and later the COVID-19 pandemic disruptions. Revised reports show that the bridge construction was finally completed on 8 June 2022. Road surfacing on the deck and approach roads, installation of safety railings, and final inspections were carried out in mid-2022. By late June 2022, NHIDCL officially listed the Rangpo Viaduct as finished.

On 4 November 2022, President Droupadi Murmu inaugurated the Atal Setu. The event underscored the bridge’s strategic importance as Sikkim’s new Gateway. Two years later, on 20 February 2025, local officials unveiled a large "Welcome to Sikkim" signboard at the Rangpo end of the bridge. Local politician, Lall Bahadur Das noted that the sign (bearing the slogan “Sunowlo, Samriddha ani Samrasta Sikkim”) celebrates Rangpo’s status as the entry point to Sikkim via Atal Setu. The bridge is also referred as Rangpo IBM bridge.
