= Pakyong =

Municipal city in Sikkim, India

- MunicipalCity
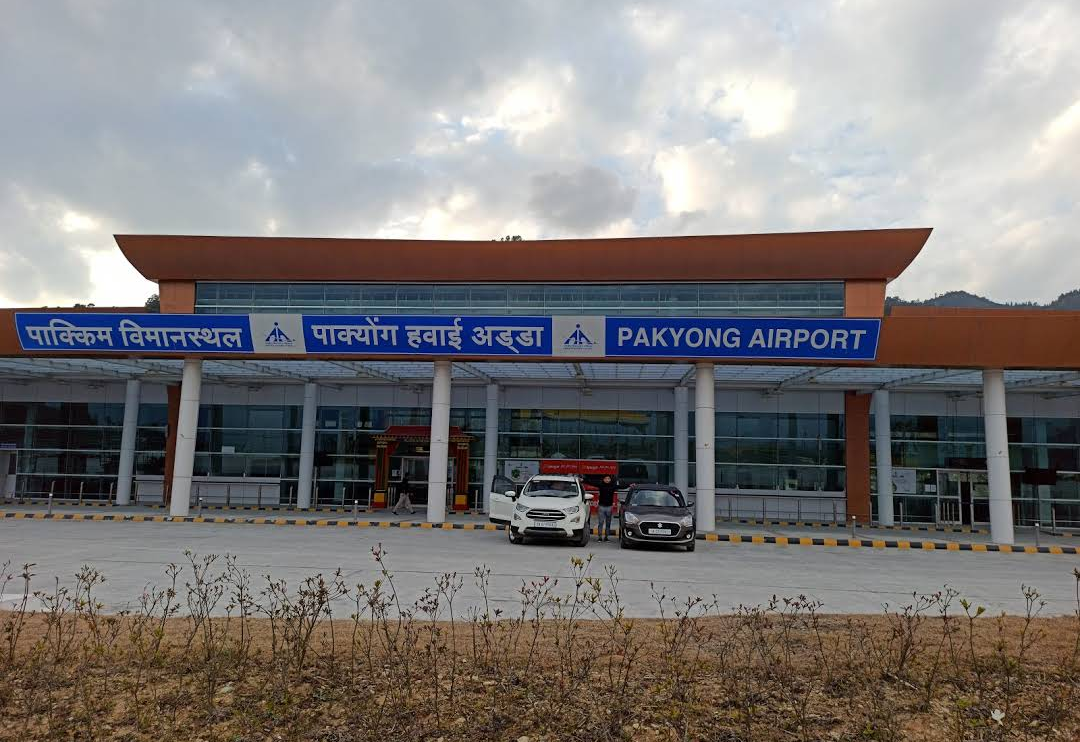
- View of Pakyong Airport in Pakyong (Sikkim)

- Location in Sikkim, India Pakyong (India) Pakyong (Asia)
- Coordinates: 27.2394°N 88.5961°E
- Country: India
- State: Sikkim
- District: Pakyong

Government
  - Type: Municipal Council
  - Body: Pakyong Municipal Council
- Elevation: 1,120 m (3,670 ft)

Languages
  - Official: English; Nepali; Sikkimese; Lepcha
  - Additional official: Gurung; Limbu; Magar; Mukhia; Newari; Rai; Sherpa; Tamang
- Time zone: UTC+5:30 (IST)
- PIN: 737 106
- Telephone code: 03592
- Vehicle registration: SK 07
- Climate: Cwb
- Lok Sabha: Sikkim Constituency
- Vidhan Sabha: Gnathang-Machong, Rhenock, Namcheybung
- Website: pakyongdistrict.nic.in

Pakyong (Nepali pronunciation: [pakːim]) is a Municipal city and district headquarters of Pakyong district in the Indian state of Sikkim, located in the foothills of the Himalayas. Pakyong Airport is the only airport of Sikkim. The "National Research Centre for Orchids" (ICAR Institute) is also located here.

== History ==
There is a missionary run school called St. Xavier's, which ranked as one of the top two schools in Sikkim during the 1990s. Notable among its alumni are the Padma Shri awardee footballer Baichung Bhutia, who captain India.

The existence of British bunkers at British Killa suggests the presence of armed bunkers sometime in the past.

The name Pakyong comes from the Lepcha words pa yong meaning "bamboo of the bow", as it was a common practise of the Lepchas to name a place after the essential items found at a place.

On 24 September 2018, Prime Minister Narendra Modi inaugurated Pakyong Airport. Regular air service started on 4 October 2018.

== Geography ==
Located in East Sikkim at an altitude of 1,700 metres (5,600 ft), it shares its borders with Bhutan and Tibet. Topography is hilly and a good agricultural area.

The villages surrounding Pakyong are Namcheybong, Ganchung, Kaputhang, Raigoan, Pachey, Samsing, Dikling, Tareythang, Pacheykhani, Pachak, Bering, Bering, Dugalakha, Linkey, Parkha, Machong, Daamlakha, Chalamthang, Barapathing, Changeysenti, Amba, Mamring, Baasilakha and Karthok.

== Economy ==
The local economy is confined to the school and minor local businesses. Ginger is cultivated and floriculture is popular. The geography makes this viable. Goondruk, Kinema, Sinki are popular fermented foods sold in the local market. "Dalle Khorsani" (red chili) is popular among the local vegetable cultivators. Cow milk, curd, Chhurpi (residue of boiled buttermilk) are other means of earning income.

The crops like Large Cardamom, Broom Plant (Kuccho) and Ginger are traded in the town at their respective seasons.

There are many banks operating in the district headquarter Pakyong.

== Transport ==
=== Roadways ===
Pakyong lies on National Highway-717A connecting Bagrakote to Gangtok via Labha, Algarah.

The town is well connected to all major parts of Sikkim and its neighbouring states. Direct Taxi and Jeep services access almost all cities and towns of Sikkim and cities/towns of West Bengal like Siliguri, Kalimpong, Jaigaon, Birpara, Panitanki, Malbazar, Bagdogra etc.

In Pakyong, NH-717A is joined by the Following major roads:

- Rorathang- Tareythang- Mamring- Pakyong Road.
- Rongli- Rolep- Machong, Linkey- Pakyong Road.
- Rangpo- Duga- Padamchey- Pakyong Road.
- Ranipool- Assamlingzey- Senti- Pakyong Road.
- Pachak- Mamzey- Dikling- Pakyong Road.
- Rongli- Gati, Bering- Mamring- Pakyong Road.
- Daamlakha- Kartok- Namcheybong- Pakyong Road.

Buses:

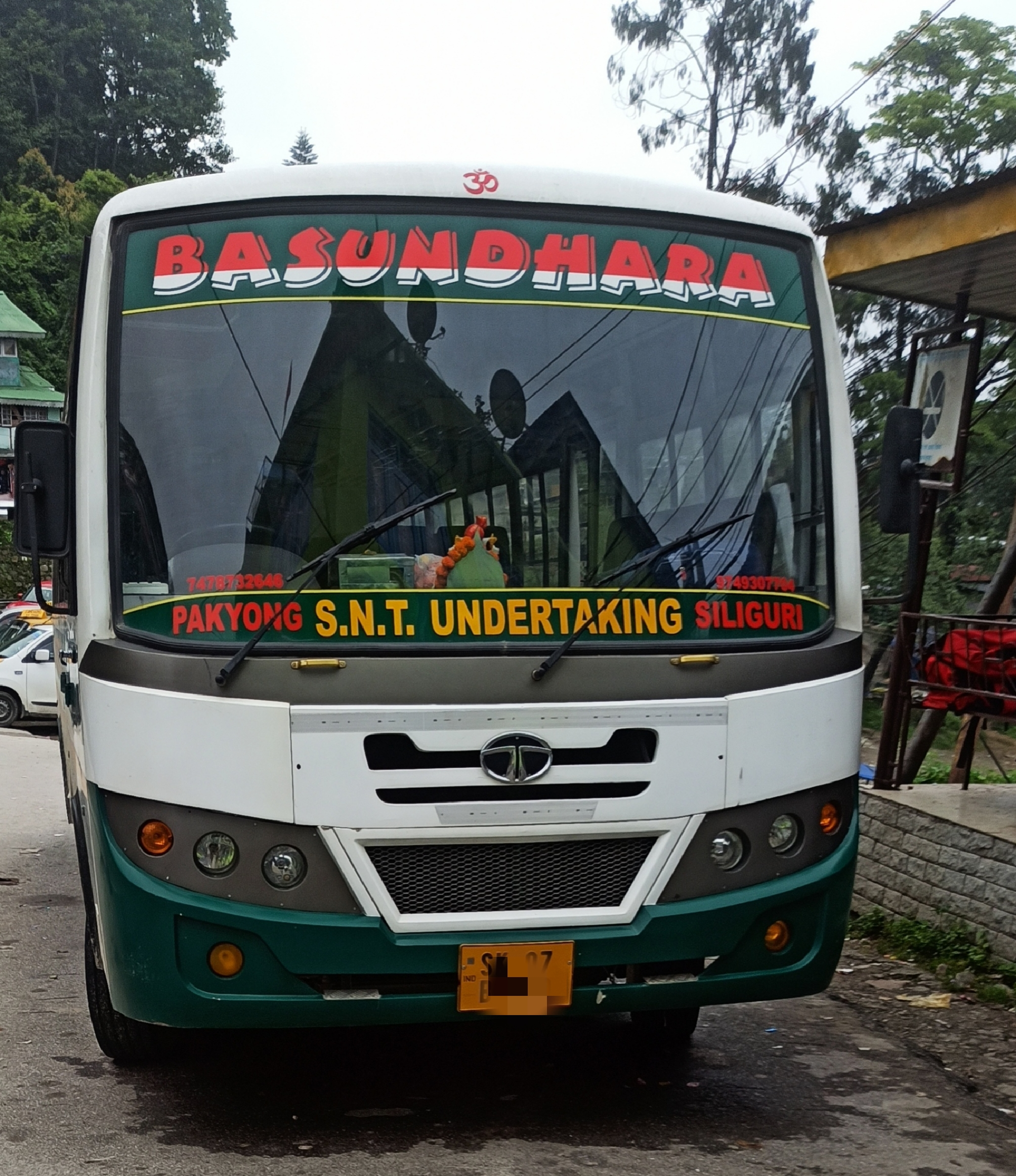
Pakyong to Siliguri SNT Bus service

SNT Bus daily service connecting Pakyong to Sikkim Nationalised Transport Bus Terminus (Siliguri) via Rangpo, Melli, Sevoke etc originates from Pakyong.

Frequent SNT buses connecting Gangtok via Ranipool are available from the city. SNT buses connecting Rongli, Rhenock, Rorathang to Gangtok also runs via Pakyong.

=== Railway ===
The nearest railway station is Siliguri Junction which is 120 kilometres away and New Jalpaiguri Junction 126 kilometres away, The under construction Rangpo railway station is 21 kilometres away from the town.

=== Airways ===
Pakyong Greenfield Airport has two parking bays and a terminal building, which can handle about 100 passengers at a time. The airport is located on top of a hill above Pakyong at 4,500 feet (1,400 m) above sea level and it is spread across over 201 acres. The entire airport, including the runway, has been built on land which was itself created by building an embankment wall as high as 263 ft in deep valleys.

== Demographics ==
Ethnic Nepalis, who settled in the region during British rule, comprise the majority of the population. Lepcha, native to the land, and Bhutias also constitute a sizable portion of the populace. Immigrant resident communities not native to the region include the Marwaris who form the backbone of the business community and own most of the shops; the Biharis who work in various trades, Bengalis involved in carpentry.

Thanks to the school, the town has attracted a cosmopolitan population with people from as far south as Kerala and Tamil Nadu.

== Culture ==
Nepali (Sikkimese) is the most widely spoken language. English and Hindi are understood in most parts of the state. Other languages include Bhutia (Sikkimese), Tibetan and Lepcha(Sikkimese).

All major Indian festivals, such as Diwali, Dussehra, Holi, Ramnavami, Janmashtami, Teej, Maha Shivaratri, Naga Panchami, Vasant Panchami, Raksha Bandhan and Makar Sankranti (the popular Hindu festivals) and Buddhist festivals like Losar, Loosong, Bhumchu, Saga Dawa, Lhabab Duechen and Drupka Teshi along with Christmas, Easter, Eid al-Fitr etc are celebrated, with most government offices and schools closing accordingly.

It is common to see school kids walking with guitars strung on their backs. Western Hip-Hop music is popular. Football and cricket are the two most popular sports and the St Xavier's School ground serves as the tournament venue, most notably the Independence Day Cup, which have in the past featured teams from as far as Calcutta, Nepal and Bhutan.

Local favourites like momo, Sel roti, Kheer, thukpa, Paratha, chowmein, Samosa, Kachori, gyathuk and wonton are available in restaurants. Momo is a popular snack, with vegetables, chicken filling steamed and served with soup. The hills traditionally have a liberal attitude towards alcohol and in many of the local functions like marriages etc., it plays an important role. A common local beverage is raksi.

== Education ==
St. Xavier's School, JNV Pakyong, Dikling Sr. Sec School, Pakyong Bazar JHS, Pachey Senior Secondary School educate students.Gurukul, ARC Academy, Puspanjali school are few of the developing autonomous educational institutions. Schools educate children in village areas too. Government Senior Secondary School Mamring was established in 1952.

== Others ==
Pakyong Police Station of Pakyong in Pakyong District of Sikkim is ranked seventh among the top ten best performing police stations in the country according to a survey conducted by the Ministry of Home Affairs, Government of India in 2020.
