= Raju Kafley =

Indian Filmmaker

- राजू काफ्ले
- Born: 5 January 1980 (age 46); Tareythang, Sikkim, India
- Occupations: Director, Screenplay writer, television host
- Years active: 1998 Onwards
- Known for: Nirankush
- Spouse: Hema Adhikari

Raju Kafley is an Indian film director and screenwriter known for his debut feature film Nirankush (निरंकुश)

== Early life ==
Born and brought up in Sikkim, Raju did his schooling from Tareythang Secondary School and secondary education from West Point Senior Secondary School. At college, he was involved in the theatre society through National Service Scheme. Initially, he worked as a Radio Jockey at Times FM 90.6 MHz. Soon after, he developed strive for cinema and moved to Mumbai, where he established a career as a filmmaker and screenwriter.

== Career ==
While doing theatres Raju worked as a director for Key Entertainment. Late in 2006 he got a break and started his Bollywood career as an associate or assistant director on a number of Bollywood films. Raju started his career in Mumbai as an assistant director in the TV serials like Kasauti, Kumkum, Naaginn, Doli Sazake, and Grahasti etc. After 2006, he entered Bollywood Hindi Movies as an assistant director and worked in the movies like Phir Kabhi, Race, U Me Aur Hum, Morning Walk, Chutki Bajake, and Tum Jo Mile etc. His debut Hindi feature film as an independent film director is Nirankush, that was shot during the year 2012 and was released in March 2013. Kafley and the author Ashutosh Agnihotri jointly developed the story and the screenplay of the movie in the year 2010. The movie is based on the popular Robert Louis Stevenson novel Dr. Jekyll and Mr. Hyde.

=== Director ===
- 2013: a psychological journey - Nirankush

=== Writer ===
- 2013: a psychological journey - Nirankush
