= Sikkim Cricket Association =

Governing body of cricket in Sikkim state, India

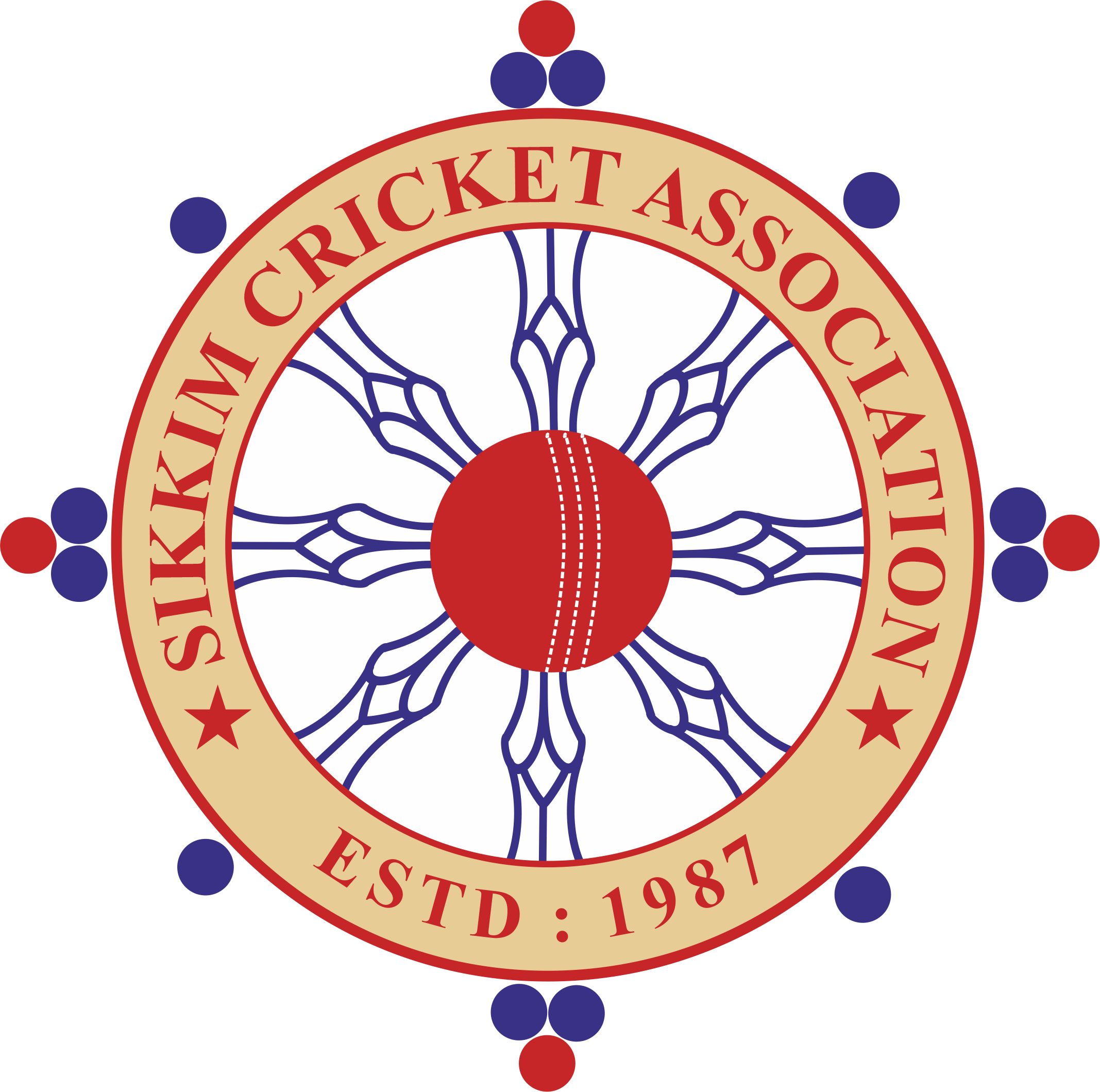
- Sport: Cricket
- Jurisdiction: Sikkim
- Abbreviation: SICA
- Founded: 1987
- Affiliation: Board of Control for Cricket in India
- Headquarters: Sikkim Cricket Ground, Opp. Eco Paradise,
- Location: Rangpo
- President: Tika Subba
- Secretary: Rinzing Namgyal Bhutia

Official website
- www.sikkimcricket.com
- (India)

Sikkim Cricket Association (SCA) is the governing body of the Cricket in the Indian state of Sikkim and the Sikkim cricket team. It is headquartered in Rangpo, Sikkim. Among other duties, SCA is responsible for organizing various cricketing tournaments in the state. It is affiliated to the Board of Control for Cricket in India as a Full Member.

Sikkim Cricket Ground in Rangpo, Pakyong district is the official cricket ground in Sikkim and has been leased to Sikkim Cricket Association in 2002 by the Government of Sikkim.

Mr. Tika Subba is the current President of Sikkim Cricket Association.

== History ==
Sikkim Cricket Association was formed and registered under the Government of Sikkim in 1987. In 1989 Polly Umrigar and Madhav Mantri both BCCI members visited Sikkim and were very impressed with the Mining Cricket Ground (the home ground of SCA) and its potential for being converted into a world-class stadium.

It was in 1991, Sikkim Cricket Association got affiliated to Board of Control for Cricket in India (BCCI)

In 1994, the Sikkim team participated in their first Junior Level National Tournament, and also in 1997 the first match was played in Sikkim Cricket Ground, Rangpo, Sikkim against Bihar U-19 team and the match was Inaugurated by The Honorable Chief Minister of Sikkim.

== Tournaments ==
The Sikkim Cricket Association participates in following BCCI tournaments.

- Ranji Trophy(Multi-Day)
- Vijay Hazare Trophy(One Day)
- Syed Mushtaq Ali Trophy (Twenty20)
- Col. C. K. Nayudu Trophy (Multi-Day) U23 Men's
- Men's U23 One Day
- Vinoo Mankad Trophy (One Day) U19 Men's
- Cooch Behar Trophy (Multi-Day) U19 Men's
- Vijay Merchant Trophy (Multi-Day) U16 Men's
- Senior Women's One Day League
- Senior Women's T20 League
- Women's U23 One Day League
- Women's U23 Twenty20 League
- Women's U19 One Day League
- Women's U19 Twenty20 League

== Home ground ==
- Sikkim Cricket Ground
