= Rorathang =

- Town
- Location in Sikkim, India Rorathang (India) Rorathang (Asia)
- Coordinates: 27.1953°N 88.6108°E
- Country: India
- State: Sikkim
- District: Pakyong District
- Elevation: 500 m (1,600 ft)

Language
  - Official: Nepali (Gorkha), Lepcha, Limbu, Newari, Rai, Gurung, Mangar, Bhutia, Sherpa, Tamang and Sunwar
- Time zone: UTC+5:30 (IST)
- PIN: 737133
- Telephone code: 03592
- Vehicle registration: SK 01, SK 07
- Climate: Cwb
- Lok Sabha: Sikkim Constituency
- Nearest cities: Gangtok - 43 Km; Kalimpong -48 Km
- Nearest Airport: Pakyong Airport
- Nearest Railway Station: Rangpo Junction
- Vidhan Sabha: Rhenock Constituency
- Website: pakyongdistrict.nic.in

Rorathang is a town situated in the bank of Rangpo River on National Highway-717A, in Pakyong District of Sikkim, India.

== Transport ==
=== Roadways ===
Rorathang lies on National Highway-717A connecting Bagrakote to Gangtok via Labha- Algarah.National Highway-717A is the part of Bharatmala Pariyojana of Ministry of Road Transport and Highways, Government of India.

In Rorathang, NH-717A is joined by the following roads:

- Rangpo-Kumrek-Rorathang Road,
- Pakyong-Tareythang-Rorathang Road,
- Rongli-Mulukay-Rorathang Road and
- Pakyong-Taza-Rorathang road.

The town is well connected to many parts of Sikkim and its neighbouring state West Bengal. Taxi and jeep services access Gangtok, Pakyong, Rhenock, Singtam, Rangpo, Rongli, Ranipool and Siliguri.

Buses:

Sikkim Nationalized Transport (SNT) buses are available from Rorathang. The bus connecting Rongli to Sikkim Nationalised Transport Bus Terminus (Siliguri) runs via Rorathang. Also SNT bus connecting Rhenock to Gangtok and Rolep- Rongli to Gangtok via Pakyong, Rangpo, Singtam etc are available from the town. Apart from them many buses belonging to private companies/industries/factories etc runs from Rorathang.

=== Airways ===
The nearest airport is Pakyong Airport 11 kilometres away and Bagdogra International Airport is 98 kilometres away from the town.

=== Railways ===
The nearest railway stations are:

- Sevoke Junction 65 kilometres.
- Siliguri Junction 86 kilometres.
- New Jalpaiguri 92 kilometres.
- Malbazar Junction 112 kilometers
- Rangpo Railway Station is an under construction station 11 kilometres away from the town.

== Geography ==
Located at 27.197011°N 88.613188°E in Pakyong district, Topography is hilly and flat land in river belts it lies in the shiwalik range of himalayas which is a good agricultural area with abundance of water as many rivers flows through the town and nearby villages. The confluence of River Rangpo with its tributaries River Pachey and River Reshi is at Rorathang. Rorathang lies on the border of Sikkim-West Bengal, One can reach Furun Gaon, Simanadara Village, Kashone village etc of west Bengal's Kalimpong District from Rorathang after crossing river reshi, River rangpo also demarcates the Sikkim-West Bengal Border after meeting with river reshi.

The villages of Sikkim surrounding the town are Taza, Tareythang, Pacheykhani, Bering, Kumrek, Tarpin, Amba, Mulukay, Kamerey, Bhasmey, Pithang, Titribotey, Padamchey, Bengthang, Kaizaley, Shalghari, etc.

The town is situated 12 kilometres away from Rangpo, 9 kilometres away from Rhenock, 14 kilometres away from Rongli, and 19 kilometres away from the Subdivision Headquarter Pakyong.

== Economy ==
Rorathang and nearby areas have many companies since Rorathang is one of the important Industrial hub of Sikkim, hosting many companies like Cipla Pharmaceuticals, Golden Cross Pharmaceuticals, Lupin Pharmaceuticals, Zuventus Healthcare, Zydus Healthcare, Zydus Pharmaceuticals, Swiss Garnier Pharmaceuticals, Kingfisher Beer Factory, Indichem Pharmaceuticals, Alkem Laboratories, Gati Hydro Electric Power Project, Savi Healthcare, Northeast Pharma Packaging Company, Ideal Cures Private Limited, National Institute of Electronics & Information Technology, and Malu Electrodes Private Limited.

Due to the establishment of many companies in the town and nearby areas, huge employment opportunities got generated which ultimately led to the growth of the infrastructure because of unending demands of accommodation for workers, employees, officers etc. Also the demand of local vegetables, dairy products, non veg items increased heavily. As a result the economy got boosted.

The crops like Large Cardamom, Broom Plant (Kuccho) and Ginger are traded in the town at their respective seasons.

State Bank of Sikkim, Rorathang Branch has run for many years in the town. Consumer Service Points of State Bank of India, Axis Bank, HDFC Bank and Central Bank of India are also available in the town.

Rorathang lies under Pakyong Subdivision of East Sikkim. The town has one Police Station.

Weekly market (Haat Bazar) is organised on every Thursday.

== History ==
As per elderly citizens of Sikkim, Rorathang was one of the large and very old market that was nearly 1-2 kilometres away from the present day town towards Pithang at the bank of river Rangpo. But unfortunately in the 1968 Flash Floods of Sikkim, the entire town got washed away by River Rangpo and its tributaries. After massive destruction, slowly again new settlement started in the present day Rorathang, as it was bit high in altitude than the old town and therefore less vulnerable to flash floods. Thereafter the population increased rapidly due to establishment of companies/factories/industries etc.

== Demographics ==
As of the 2011 Census of India, Rorathang has population of 4861 of which 2592 are males while 2269 are females as per Population Census 2011.

In Rorathang population of children with age 0-6 makes up 10.42% of total population of village. Average Sex Ratio of Rorathang is 876. Child Sex Ratio for the Rorathang as per census is 1021, higher than Sikkim average of 957.

Literacy rate of Rorathang is 76.48%. In Rorathang Male literacy stands at 81.70% while female literacy rate was 70.43%.

== Climate ==
It has a humid subtropical type of climate ranging from 2 °C in winter to 30 °C in summer. It is normally dry in winter but rainfall occurs all year round. Monsoon season starts during the second week of June till September which is characterised by heavy rainfall, landslides and dense fog can disrupt travel during this days. Average rainfall in a year ranges from 2800mm- 3000mm. Best time to visit here is during spring and autumn season when plenty of sunshine is available making it a pleasurable day but afternoon thunderstorms are common during afternoon hours in pre monsoon (spring) and post-monsoon (autumn) season with strong surface winds, hailstorms and heavy rainfall it is always advisable to look at weather forecast before planning such trips.

== Education institutes ==
Government Senior Secondary School Rorathang is the main Senior Secondary School in the area. Apart from it, there are some other private and Government schools in the region. For higher studies, the nearest institutions are Government Degree College, Rungdung, Rhenock and Pakim Palantine College, New Market, Pakyong.

== Places of interest ==
- Rorathang Bridge along Rangpo River.
- Confluence point (Dreamland Adventure Island, Sikkim - West Bengal Border) of river Reshi and River Rangpo is an excellent picnic spot, which is 1 km from Rorathang market towards Kumrek.
- Gulmohar Picnic Spot, Kumrek which is 6 km from Rorathang market towards Rangpo.
- Rorathang Shivalaya Mandir.
- Indreni Waterfalls, Kaizaley, is around 3 - 4 kms from market towards Tareythang.
- Kali Khola Waterfalls which is 7.5 kilometres away from Rorathang market towards Rongli.
- Gati Hydro Electric Power House, Dam Site is 10 kilometres away from the town towards Rongli.
- Banday Pokhrel view point which is 12 kilometres from Rorathang market towards Tareythang.

== See also ==
- Pakyong
- Rangpo
- Rangpo River
- Rongli
- Rhenock
