= State Bank of Sikkim =

Publicly owned bank

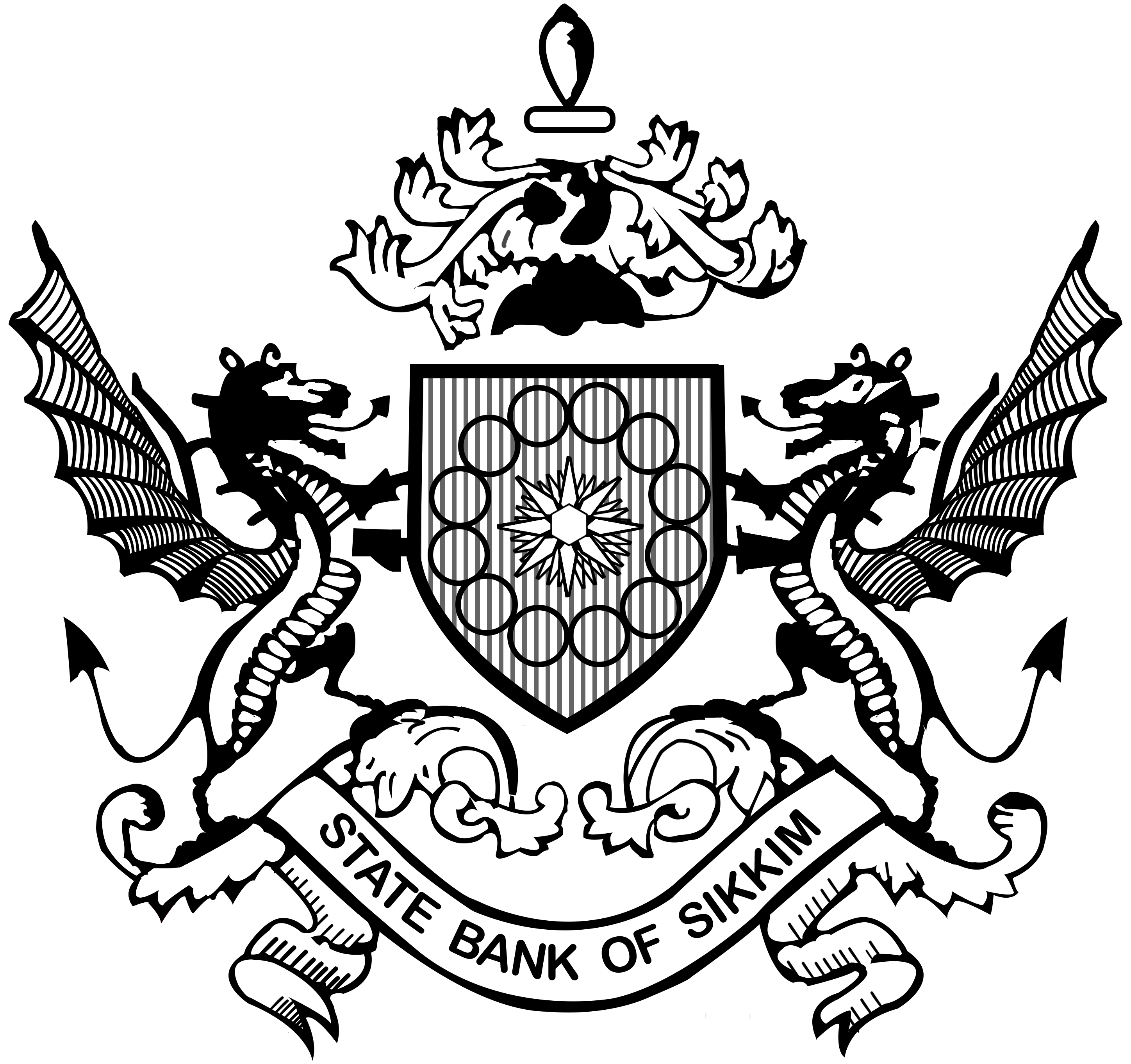
- Company type: Public Sector Undertakings
- Industry: Banking
- Founded: 1968 (58 years ago)
- Headquarters: Gangtok Sikkim, India
- Number of locations: 57 branches
- Area served: Sikkim
- Key people: Mr. Phurba Wangdi Bhutia (Managing Director)
- Products: Personal Loans; Home Loans; Pensioners Loan; Motor Loan Scheme; Treasury to the Government of Sikkim
- Owner: Autonomous body wholly owned by Government of Sikkim
- Website: statebankofsikkim.com

State Bank of Sikkim (SBS) is a state owned banking institution headquartered at Gangtok, Sikkim, India. In addition to banking services, State Bank of Sikkim handles treasury functions of the Sikkim State Government.

It is an autonomous body under the Government of Sikkim. It is not regulated by the Reserve Bank of India. However, the report of the Comptroller and Auditor General of India for the year ended March 2012 recorded that the performance of State Bank of Sikkim generated 86 percent of the total profit earned by the state owned PSUs during the year.

The Bank completed 50 years in 2018, during which it worked in partnership with development projects in the state.

== History ==
State Bank of Sikkim was established in 1968 under the State Bank of Sikkim Proclamation, 1968. It was initially headquartered at MG Marg, Gangtok and later moved to the present location, holding its headquarters and main branch. Initially started with a single branch, growing 54 branches with 6 Revenue Counters.

The bank converted to Core Banking Solution (CBS) in April 2017.

== Branches ==
As of 2023 the facilities include:

- Gangtok district: Bojoghari, Gangtok Main, Deorali, Khamdong, Makha, Manan Kendra, Head Office, Nandok, Rakdong-Tintek, Ranipool, Ranka, Sang, Sichey Gangtok, Singtam, SNT Extension counter, Tadong, Tsomgo, Sochakgang Extension Counter, Secretariat, Gangtok Main Extension counter, KSC Lal Bazar, Chongay.

- Pakyong district: Pakyong Bazar, Pakyong DC Office Extension counter, Rangpo Check Post, Parakha, Rorathang, Rongli, Rhenock, Majhitar, Rangpo Bazaar.

- Mangan district: Chungthang, Mangan, Passingdong, Phodong, Lachen, Lachung, Kabi.

- Gyalshing district: Darap, Legship, Dentam, Gyalshing, Martam, Rinchenpong, Rabdentse, Tashiding, Yuksom, Uttaray.

- Namchi district: Bhanjyang, Jorethang, Kewzing, Melli Bazar, Melli Check Post Extension Counter, Ravangla, Namchi Bazar, Namchi Extension Counter, Namthang, Temi, Yangyang.

- Soreng district: Sombaria, Soreng, Chumbong Extension Counter, Nayabazar, Mangalbaria.
