= Lake Menmecho =

Lake in Sikkim, India

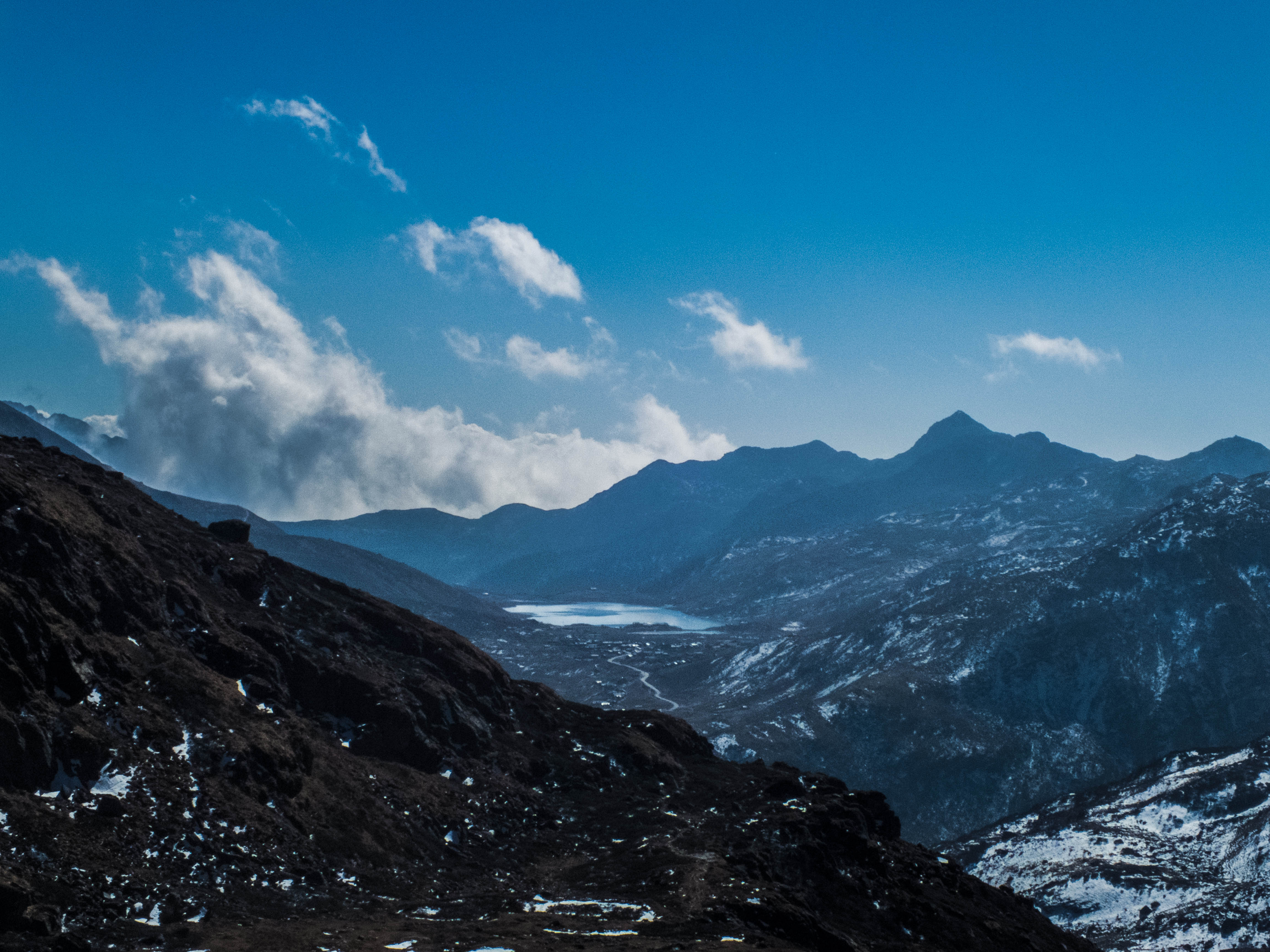
- Lake as seen from the Nathu La-Gangtok Highway.

- Location in Sikkim Lake Menmecho (India)
- Location: Gangtok district, Sikkim, India
- Coordinates: 27°20′40″N 88°49′04″E
- Primary outflows: Rangpo chu
- Basin countries: India

Menmecho Lake is a mountain lake located in Gangtok district in the Indian state of Sikkim. It lies on the way to the Jelep Pass and is situated 20 kilometres (12 mi) ahead of the Lake Tsomgo. It is the source of the river Rangpo chu, a tributary of the Teesta River. The waters of the lake are sourced by melting snow in summer, and the monsoon in the wet season.

It is at an altitude of 3,830 metres (12,500ft). It is a tourist attraction and one of the eight lakes in Sikkim.

The lake is noted for its trout, and has a large fish farm nearby with a guesthouse. Menmecho is closed to tourists.

== Gallery ==
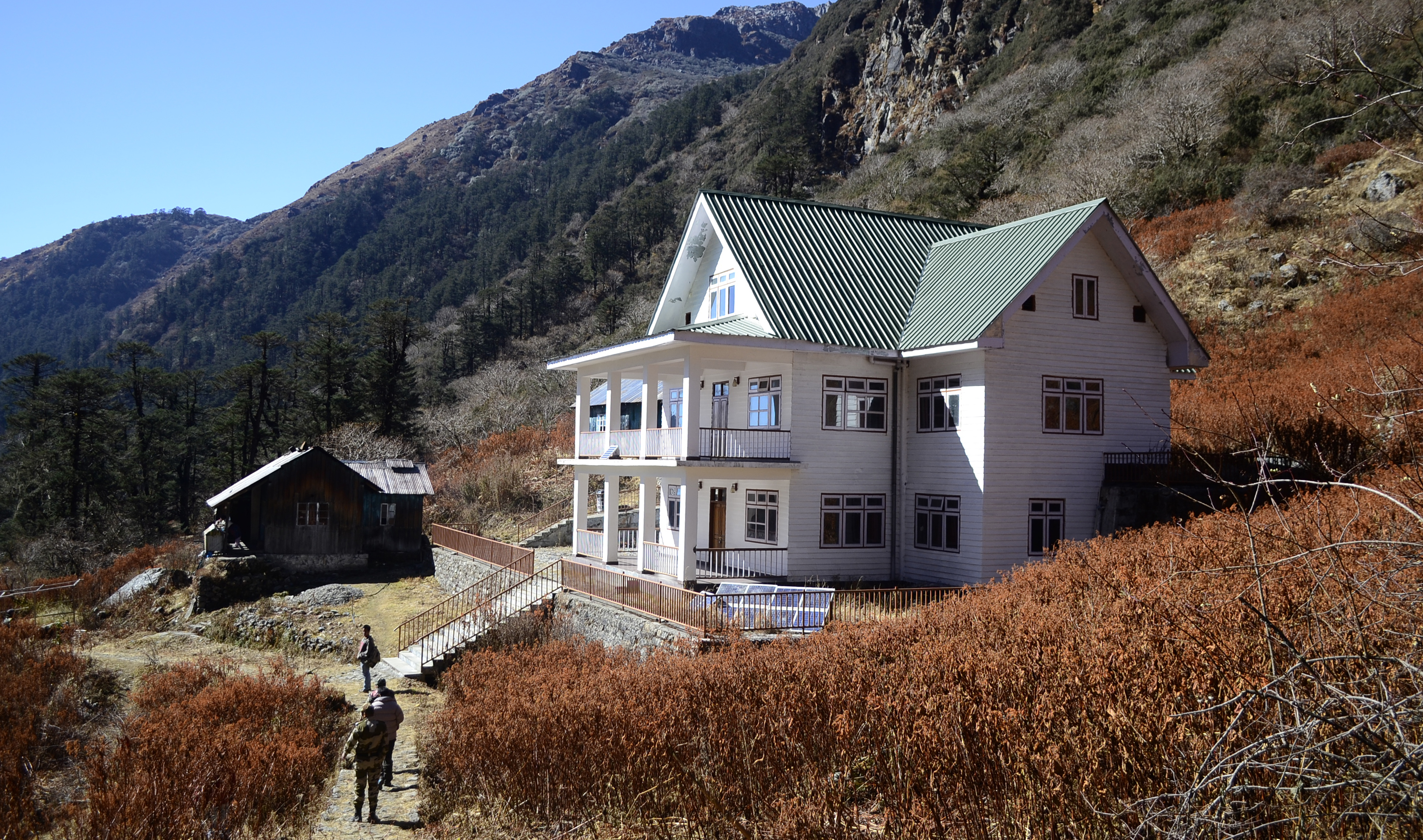
MenmoiTso lake.. the Cottage to stay

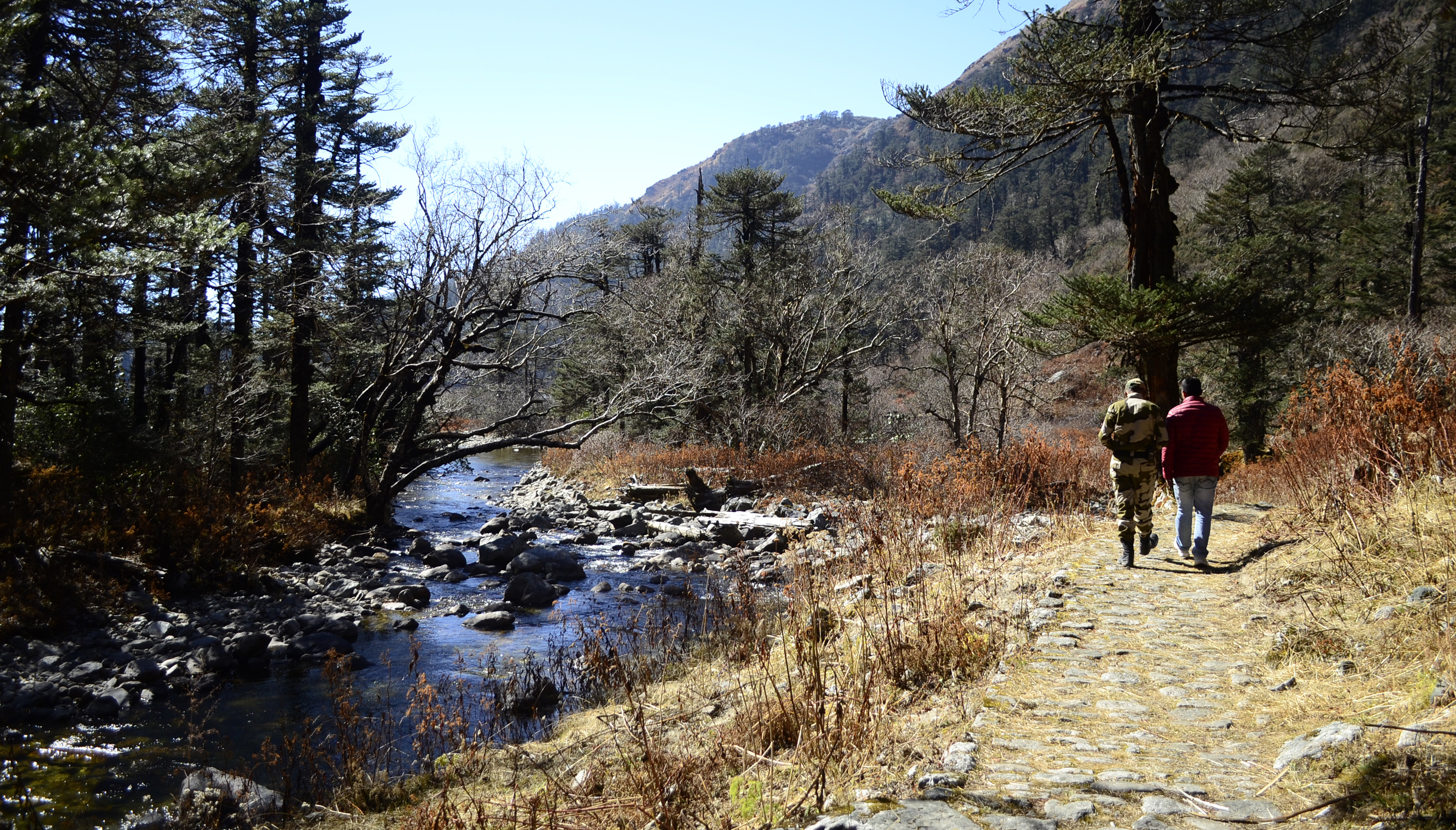
MenmoiTso lake..the jungle trail towards the lake

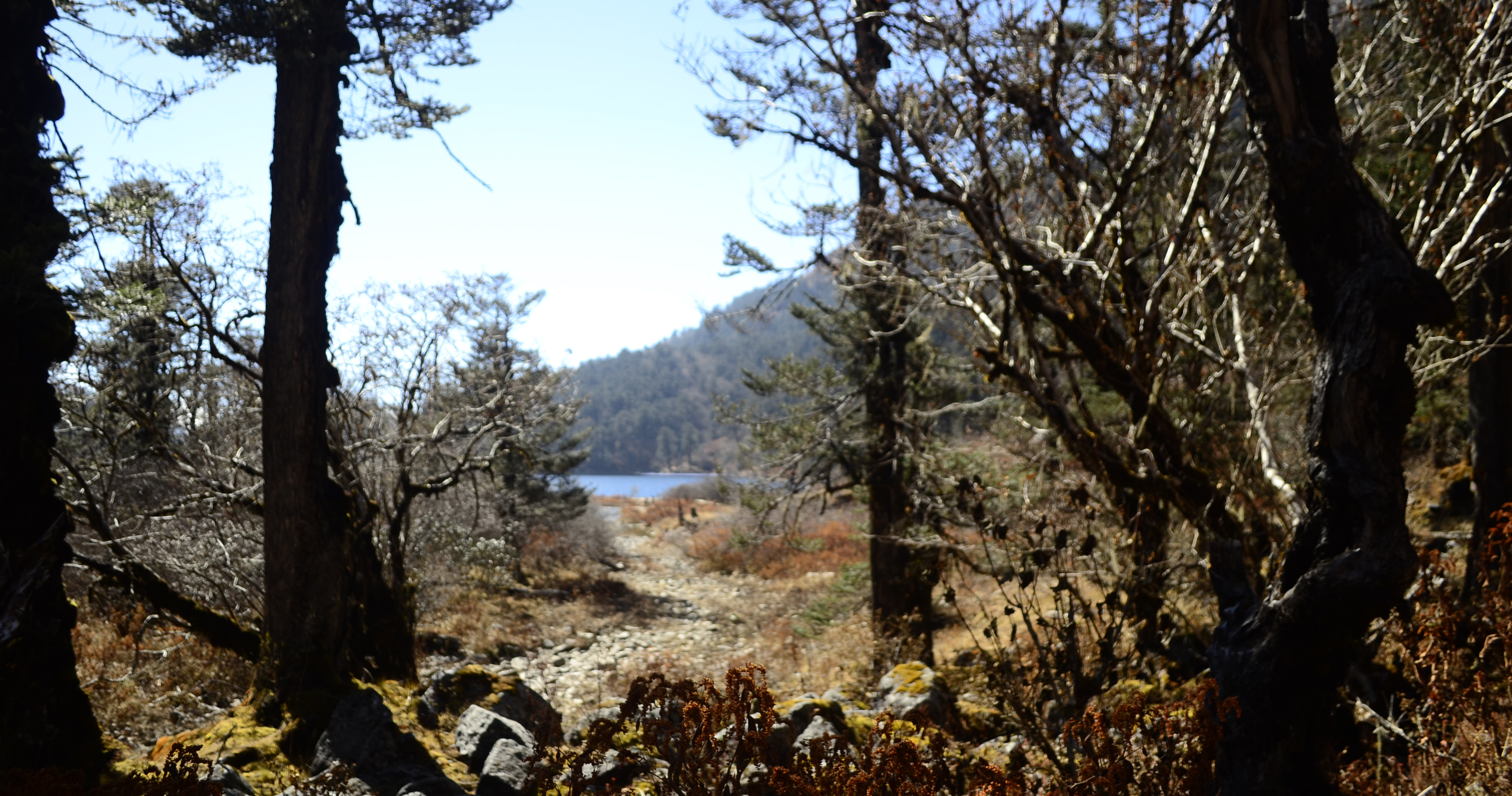
MenmoiTso lake..the distance first look
