= Kumrek =

- Urban Village
- Location within Sikkim Location within India
- Coordinates: 27.1845°N 88.5503°E
- Country: India
- State: Sikkim
- District: Pakyong District
- Elevation: 200 m (656 ft)

Language
  - Official: Nepali (Gorkha), Lepcha, Limbu, Bhutia, Newari, Rai, Gurung, Mangar, Sherpa, Tamang and Sunwar
- Time zone: UTC+5:30 (IST)
- Postal code: 737136
- Vehicle registration: SK01/SK 07
- Climate: Cwa
- Lok Sabha constituency: Sikkim Constituency
- Vidhan Sabha constituency: Rhenock Assembly constituency
- Nearest City: Kalimpong- 40 km, Gangtok- 42 km
- Website: eastsikkim.nic.in

Kumrek is an urban village lying on the bank of River Rangpo in Pakyong District in the Indian state of Sikkim. The nearest towns are Rangpo (4 kilometres (2.5 mi) away) and Rorathang (8 kilometres (5.0 mi)). It is about 200 metres (660 ft) above sea level giving it a sub-tropical climate.

== Transport ==
Kumrek lies on the road connecting Rangpo to Rorathang. Nearest airport from Kumrek is the Pakyong Airport which is situated 32 kilometres away from the town and the nearest railway station is Rangpo railway station 5 kilometres away from the town.

== Economy ==
The entire belt of Kumrek – Rorathang and Kumrek – Rangpo is the manufacturing hotspot of Sikkim. There are numerous pharmaceutical companies along this way.

List of some of major companies of Kumrek are as follows:

- Alkem Laboratories
- Cipla
- Indchemie Health Specialities Pvt. Ltd.
- Zuventus Healthcare.
- Zydus Lifesciences
- Scorpion Containers Pvt. Ltd.
- Malu Electrodes Private Limited
- Seigneur Medipack Unit Sikkim.
- Lupin Limited
- Madhya Bharat Power Corporation Etc.
