= Chalamthang =

Village in Namchi District, Sikkim, India

Chalamthang is a village in Namchi district of Sikkim and is located at 27.2119° N, 88.4711° E. It is located 42 km away from Gangtok, capital of Sikkim and 98 km away from Siliguri. It is located at half an hour drive from Singtam, its nearest town. Chalamthang has adopted Community Based Homestay since the year 2015. Chalamthang has started the initiative to become cleanest organic village in Sikkim in the year 2018.
