= Rangpo =

Town in Sikkim, India, bordering West Bengal

- Municipality
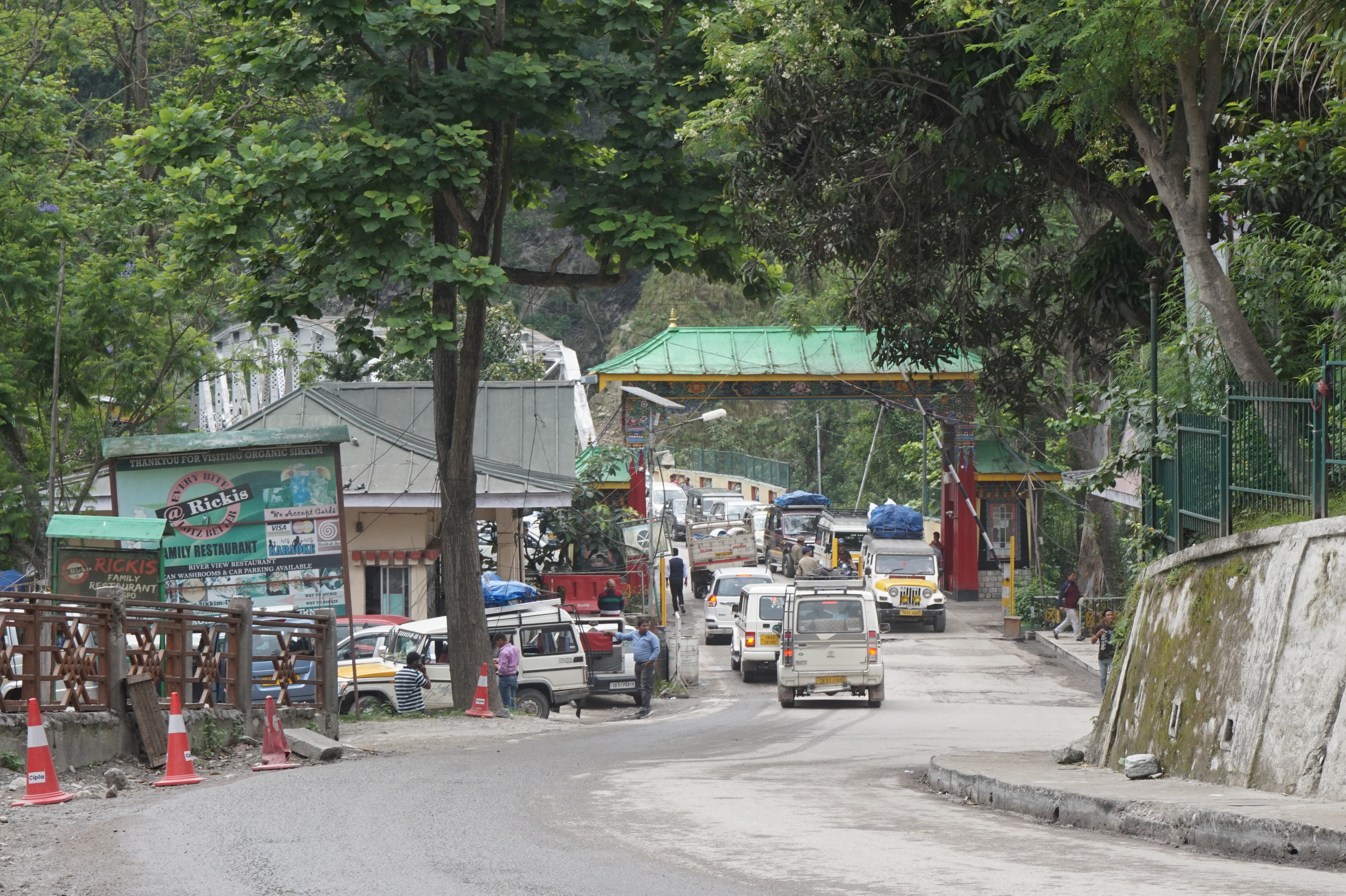
- Rangpo Police Checkpoint, Sikkim

- Location in Sikkim, India Rangpo (India) Rangpo (Asia)
- Coordinates: 27.175°N 88.530°E
- Country: India
- State: Sikkim
- District: Pakyong District

Government
  - Type: Nagar Panchayat
  - Body: Rangpo Municipal Council
- Elevation: 333 m (1,093 ft)

Population (2011)
  - Total: 10,450

Languages
  - Official: English; Nepali; Bhutia; Lepcha
  - Additional official: Gurung; Limbu; Magar; Mukhia; Newari; Rai; Sherpa; Tamang
- Time zone: UTC+5:30 (IST)
- PIN: 737132
- Telephone code: 03592
- Vehicle registration: SK
- Literacy: 87.27%
- Lok Sabha: Sikkim Constituency
- Railway Station: Rangpo railway station
- Nearest Airport: Pakyong Airport
- Vidhan Sabha: West Pendam Constituency
- Website: eastsikkim.nic.in

Rangpo is a Municipal town in India shared by Pakyong district of the state Sikkim and Kalimpong district of the state West Bengal. The town is situated along the Teesta River and Rangpo River. It is the first town of Sikkim lying on National Highway 10 that links Siliguri to Gangtok. It is about 300 m above sea level with a sub-tropical climate. It is the 'Gateway to Sikkim' and all vehicles entering Sikkim have to stop at the Rangpo Police check-post. Foreign tourists are required to present documents to enter Sikkim state and must show them at the police checkpoint. The Rangpo River separates the Rangpo Forest Village lying on the West Bengal side from the Rangpo Municipal Town lying on the Sikkim side.

== Geography ==
Rangpo is located at 27.18°N 88.53°E. It has an average elevation of 333 metres (1093 feet). The town lies on the belt of two rivers, River Teesta which comes from Dikchu-Singtam-Majitar side, and River Rangpo which comes from Rongli-Rorathang-Kumrek side. Both rivers meet each other below the town. The conjunction point is named Rangpo Doban and is utilized as a cremation place. Since River Teesta is the largest river and River Rangpo the third largest river of Sikkim so both rivers become violent during the monsoon season, especially between June and September; hence, sometimes the river overflows towards lower residential areas of the town and causes destruction.

== Transport ==
=== Roadways ===
As Rangpo lies on NH-10, so frequent service jeeps and taxis are available to almost all cities and towns of Sikkim and cities/towns of West Bengal like Siliguri, Kalimpong, Darjeeling, Kurseong, Jaigaon, Malbazar, Bagdogra, Panitanki etc. In Rangpo, NH-10 is joined by the following major roads:

- Rorathang-Kumrek-Rangpo Road,
- Namchi-Namthang-Rangpo Road and
- Kalimpong-Munsoong-Rangpo Road.

Buses:

Frequent buses operated by Sikkim Nationalised Transport (SNT) are available from Rangpo to Sikkim Nationalised Transport Bus Terminus (Siliguri) and Gangtok, apart from it many private buses and NBSTC buses are available from the town to Gangtok, NJP Bus stand and Tenzing Norgay Bus Terminus, (Siliguri).

=== Railway ===
Rangpo railway station is the under-construction railway station in Rangpo, which falls under Sevoke-Rangpo Railway Line, Alipurduar railway division of Northeast Frontier Railway. The nearest currently functioning railway stations are Sivok railway station - 55 km, Siliguri Junction - 75 km, and New Jalpaiguri Junction - 87 km.

=== Airways ===
The nearest airport is Pakyong Airport around 25 km away and Bagdogra International Airport around 90 km away.

== Economy ==
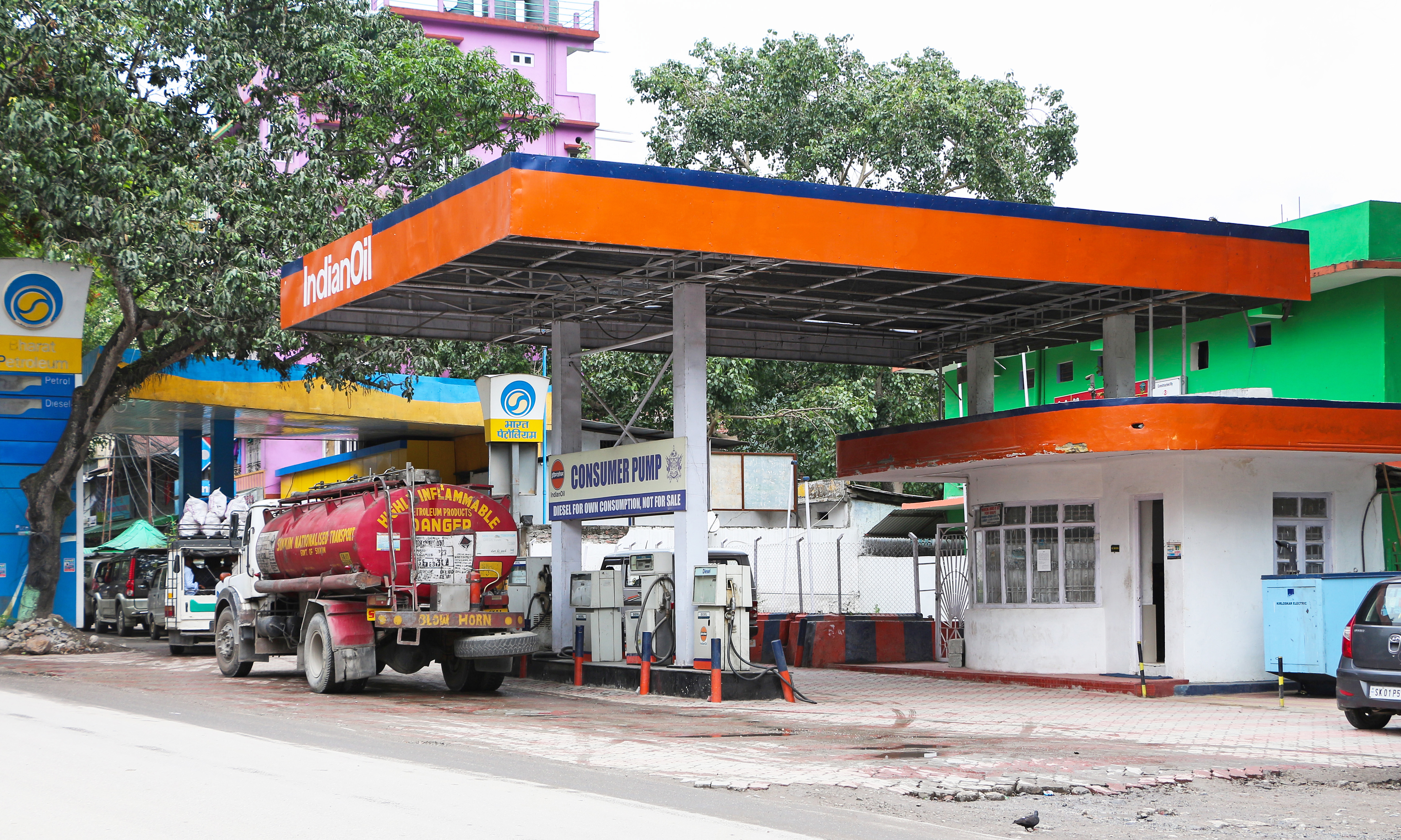
Indian Oil Petrol Pump at Rangpo, Pakyong District Sikkim

There are many factories and companies in and nearby Rangpo. The areas like Mining, Kumrek, Chanatar, etc. are home to many pharmaceutical and other factories/Industries. Rangpo Upper market along NH-10 is famous for Fast Food and Restaurants. There are many food stores in these areas. Areas like Upper market, lower market, IBM, Chanataar, Mining etc. are usually crowded.

The crops like Large Cardamom, Broom Plant (Kuccho) and Ginger are traded on a large scale in the Rangpo Lower Market.

== Attractions ==
The places of attraction in and around Rangpo are as follows:

- Mining Cricket Stadium, Rangpo which belongs to Sikkim Cricket Association.
- Atal Setu Bridge (The longest bridge of Sikkim) over River Rangpo.
- Rangpo - Mining Teesta Bridge over River Teesta.
- Rangpo Doban (confluence point of River Teesta and River Rangpo.
- Rangpo railway station which is under construction.
- Gulmohar Picnic Spot, Kumrek.

== Sports ==
Mining Cricket Stadium located at Rangpo, Pakyong district, is the largest cricket stadium in the entire Sikkim. The stadium belongs to Sikkim Cricket Association and hosts important cricket tournaments like Ranji Trophy, CK Nayudu Trophy, Cooch Behar Trophy, Vijay Merchant Trophy, etc. It is the home ground of Sikkim cricket team.

== Education ==
There are many educational institutions in Rangpo. Sikkim Manipal Institute of Technology and Himalayan Pharmacy Institute lies in Majitar just 2 km away from Rangpo.

The famous schools of the town include Rangpo Senior Secondary School, Chanataar Secondary School, New Horizon Academy, Little Bells School, Tiny Tots School, Hans Raj Academy, Ivana Memorial School, etc., on the Sikkim side, whereas Dewan Junior High School, Divya Jyoti Academy, etc., on the West Bengal side.

== Demographics ==
As of the 2001 India census, Rangpo had a population of 3,724. Males constituted 55% of the population and females 45%. Rangpo had an average literacy rate of 70%, higher than the national average of 59.5%: male literacy was 75%, and female literacy was 63%. In Rangpo, 13% of the population was under 6 years of age.

Rangpo has a large population of Bhutias and Nepalese people. Marwari and Bihari businessmen have settled in the town and own most of the shops.

=== Religion ===
Religious Demographic in Rangpo Nagar-Panchayat (2011)
1. Hinduism (74.7%)
2. Christianity (11.2%)
3. Buddhism (8.58%)
4. Islam (5.28%)
5. Others (0.23%)

=== Languages ===
Languages spoken in Rangpo Nagar-Panchayat (2011)
1. Nepali (61.0%)
2. Hindi (16.7%)
3. Bhojpuri (10.9%)
4. Bengali (4.57%)
5. Odia (1.55%)
6. Urdu (1.16%)
7. Assamese (0.76%)
8. Bhutia (0.70%)
9. Others (2.70%)

== Sikkim Railway Project ==
The foundation stone for the construction of a new railway line from Sevoke railway station (station code SVQ) to the proposed Rangpo railway station on the border of Sikkim and West Bengal was laid in October 2009 by the vice president of India. In 2008, the line was proposed to be 53 km long with 5 ft 6 in (1,676 mm) broad gauge track with only a few tunnels but the final alignment is 45 km long with more number of tunnels. Of this, 3.5 km will be in Sikkim state and the rest in West Bengal state. The track will have 28 bridges and 14 tunnels and 38.6 km of the track will be in tunnels. The track will be constructed through the foothills of the Kanchanjungha mountain range and the Teesta river valley. New railway stations will be constructed at Riayang, Geil Khola, Teesta Bazaar, Melli, and Rangpo.

The Indian Railways signed a contract with the construction company, IRCON, only in May 2010, though the foundation stone had been laid in October 2009. The final alignment had not been fixed for the first 22 km through the elephant sanctuary forest, even in 2013, and the final clearance of the environment ministry had not been received. To obtain approval of the environment and forest ministry, the railways made a proposal in February 2013 to install elephant sensors along the stretch of the proposed railway line in Mahananda elephant sanctuary or run the trains at a speed of only 20 km per hour in the forest area and stop when an elephant is sighted close to the track. People of two villages in East Sikkim, through which a 3.5 km stretch of the 45 km long railway line has been planned, had not agreed to give their land for laying the track.

The Supreme Court of India approved the project in February 2016 with strict guidelines of the National Wildlife Board that cleared the project in June 2015, but ordered restricted speed, wireless animal tracking sensors, and allowed digging of tunnels only during daytime. However, a "No Objection Certificate" (NOC) was still needed from the gram sabhas (village councils) of all the villages in Darjeeling and Kalimpong districts in West Bengal through which the track will pass. The construction cannot start without the NOC. However, the Gram Sabhas do not exist due to the non-holding of rural elections in the Hills for the past several years, and therefore, no NOC could be obtained. This is a catch 22 situation holding up the commencement of construction. The project cost has escalated from the estimated cost of Rs. 13.4 billion in 2008 to Rs. 60 billion, and construction of the railway line has not started even in 2018. The Railway Board chairman visited and met the Northeast Frontier Railway (NFR) officials on 2 March 2018 to discuss the status of the project. Finally, a NOC was issued by GTA on 11 April 2018 on behalf of the villages. However, no tender has been issued and no bid has been invited for the project after April 2018.

The railway line is needed for security and socio-economic reasons. The railway line will help troops and armaments move faster towards the Indo-Tibet border. The new railway line allows easier access to the rest of India through Siliguri. It will boost the state's economy and tourism.

=== Summary of Sikkim railway project ===
- Estimated cost: Rs. 1,340 crore (13.4 billion) in 2008, but may exceed Rs. 60 billion when the project is completed in 2022.
- Length of final alignment: 44.98 km
- Length of track in Bengal: 41.54 km
- Length of track in Sikkim: 3.44 km
- Stations: Riang (or Riayang), Gailkhola (or Geil Khola), Teesta Bazaar, Melli, and Rangpo
- Nearest large junction: New Jalpaiguri (30 km from Sevoke through Siliguri junction)
- Route under tunnels: 38.64 km (86%)
- Number of bridges: 28
- Number of tunnels: 14
- Longest tunnel: 5.1 km

== 2023 Sikkim Flash Floods ==
Rangpo was affected by the 2023 Sikkim flash floods, which hit Rangpo at around 2 AM on 4 October 2023. Most surviving victims were shifted to relief camps by the authorities immediately.

== See also ==
- Singtam
- Rorathang
- Majitar
- Kumrek
- Rangpo railway station
