= Kitam Bird Sanctuary =

- IUCN category IV (habitat/species management area)
- Location within Sikkim Location within India
- Interactive map of Kitam Bird Sanctuary
- Nearest city: Namchi
- Coordinates: 27°6′0″N 88°20′0″E
- Area: 6 km^{2} (2.3 sq mi)
- Established: 3 February 2005
- Website: Sikkim forest department

Kitam Bird Sanctuary is a protected area and wildlife sanctuary located about 19 km (12 mi) Namchi in the Namchi district of the Indian state of Sikkim. It was declared as a protected area on 3 February 2005.

== Description ==
Located on the foothills of the Himalayas, the sanctuary is located at altitudes between 1,200 ft (370 m) to 3,200 ft (980 m) and covers an area of 6 km^{2} (2.3 sq mi).

The protected area consists of tropical deciduous forests with pine and sal trees. Fauna found in the sanctuary include barking deer, wild boar, Assamese macaque, masked palm civet, Himalayan crestless porcupine, small Indian civet, small Indian mongoose, and may species of butterflies. Birds include oriental white-eye, kalij, Indian peafowl, red junglefowl, scarlet minivet, green magpie, and Himalayan flameback amongst others.
