= List of state highways in Sikkim =

The Indian state of Sikkim has a total of 3,668.78 km (2,279.67 mi) of highways, including eight national highways with 512 km (318 mi) within the state.

== Type of road and its length ==
State highways are Sikkim's arterial routes, linking district headquarters and important towns within the state and connecting them with national highways or highways of neighbouring states.

Sl. No.	Type of road	Length (in km)
1	National highways	512
2	State highways	732.61
3	Major district roads	1,126.31
4	Other district roads	549.68
5	Village roads	748.18
Total		3668.78

== List of state highways ==
Number	Length (km)	Length (mi)	Southern or western terminus	Northern or eastern terminus	Formed	Removed	Notes
SH 1	—	—	Gangtok - Ranipool Road To Rumtek -Sang - Sirwani		—	—	
SH 2	—	—	Gangtok-Rongek-Bhusuk-Assam-Pakyong		—	—	
SH 3	—	—	Rongli - Rorathang		—	—	
SH 4	—	—	Pakyong - Machong - Rolep - Chujachen - Rongu		—	—	
SH 5	—	—	Rumtek - Rey - Ranka - Sichey		—	—	
SH 6	—	—	Singtam - Chewribotey - Duga - Rangpo		—	—	
SH 6A	—	—	Duga - Pacheykhani		—	—	
SH 7	—	—	Penlong Tintek Raley - Kambal - Samdong		—	—	
SH 11	—	—	Namchi - Prong 4Amthang - Mamring		—	—	
SH 12	—	—	Phongla - Bermiock - Sirwani		—	—	
SH 13	—	—	Melli Turuk-Sadam- Bhanjyang		—	—	
SH 14	—	—	Pabong - S		—	—	
SH 15	—	—	Manpur - Jorethang		—	—	
SH 16	—	—	Nayabazar (Jorethang) - Namchi (510)		—	—	
SH 17	—	—	Damthang -(Nh -710) - Rabongla (510)		—	—	
SH 18	—	—	Ravangla -Yangyang		—	—	
SH 19	—	—	Namchi - Wok- Sikkip		—	—	
SH 20	—	—	Gyalshing - Pelling - Dentam - Kaluk- Soreng		—	—	
SH 21	—	—	Soreng - Sombarey Via Timberbung		—	—	
SH 22	—	—	Legship (Nh 510) - Reshi - Nayabazar		—	—	
SH 23	—	—	Kaluk - Reshi Rinchenpong Road - Nayabazar Legship		—	—	
SH 24	—	—	Nayabazar - Budang - Soreng Via Chakung		—	—	
SH 25	—	—	Budang-Daramdin - Phambong- Somaberey		—	—	
SH 26	—	—	Budang -Soreng Via Malabassey		—	—	
SH 27	—	—	Pelling - Rimbi -Yoksum Phatak - Tashiding Gumpa Phatak- Legship (Gangtok More)		—	—	
