= Sikkim =

State in northeastern India

- State
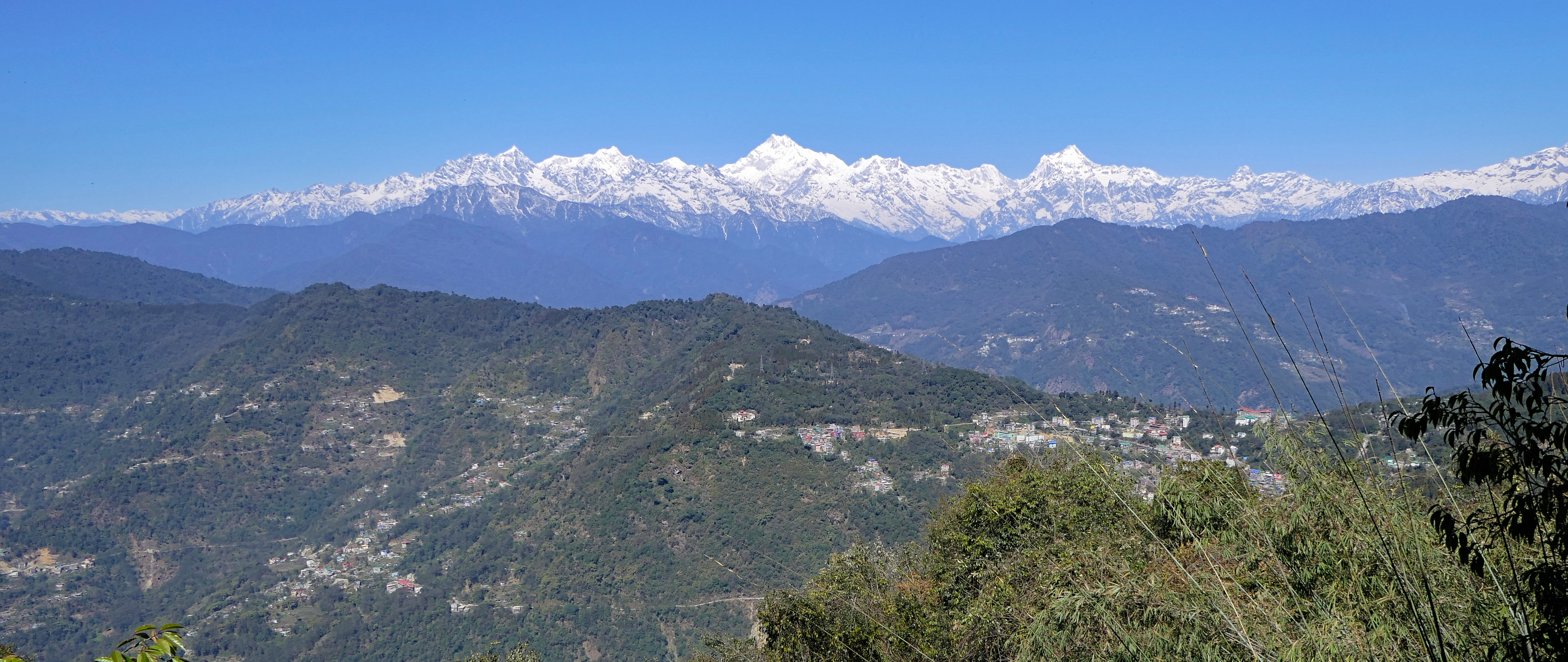
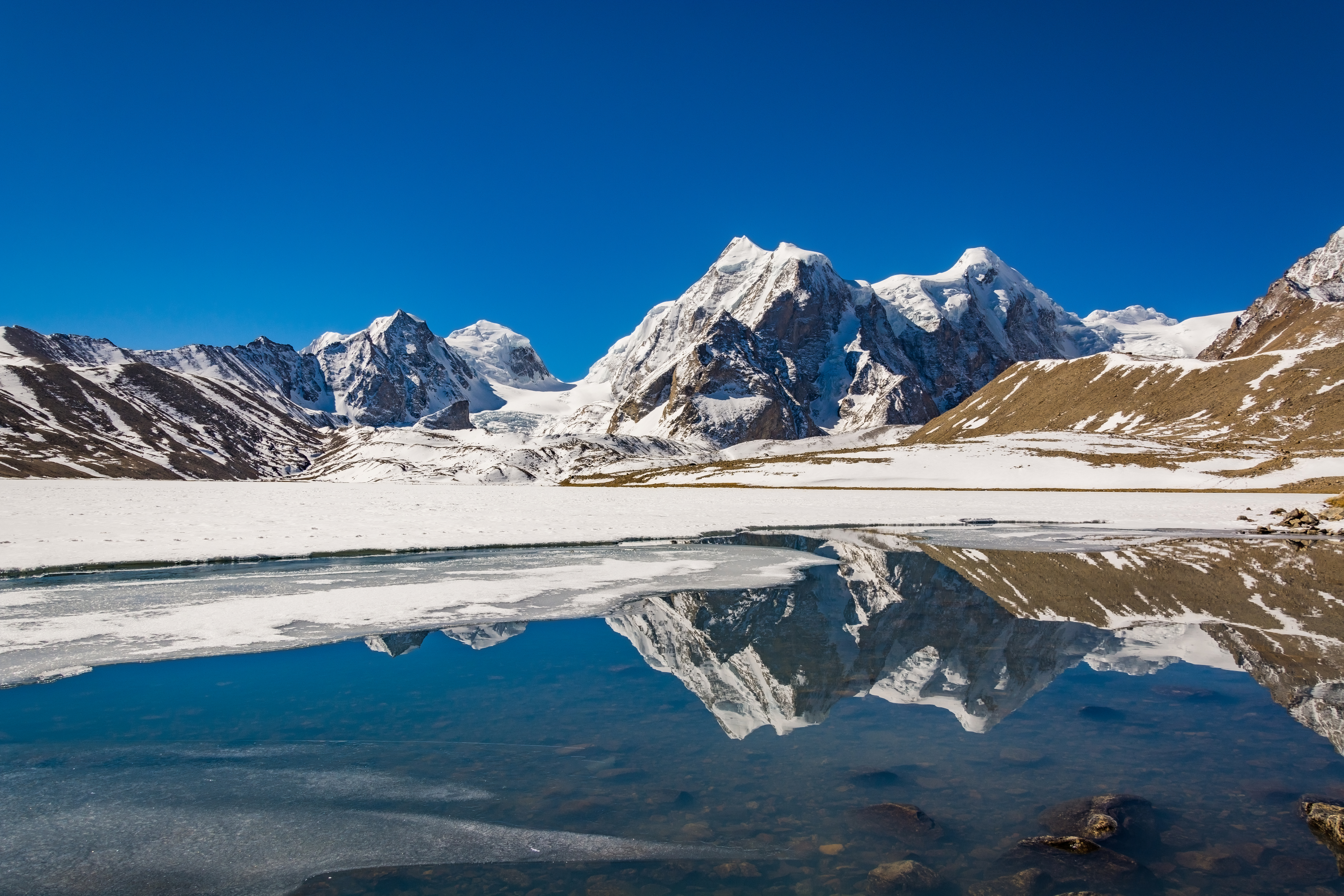
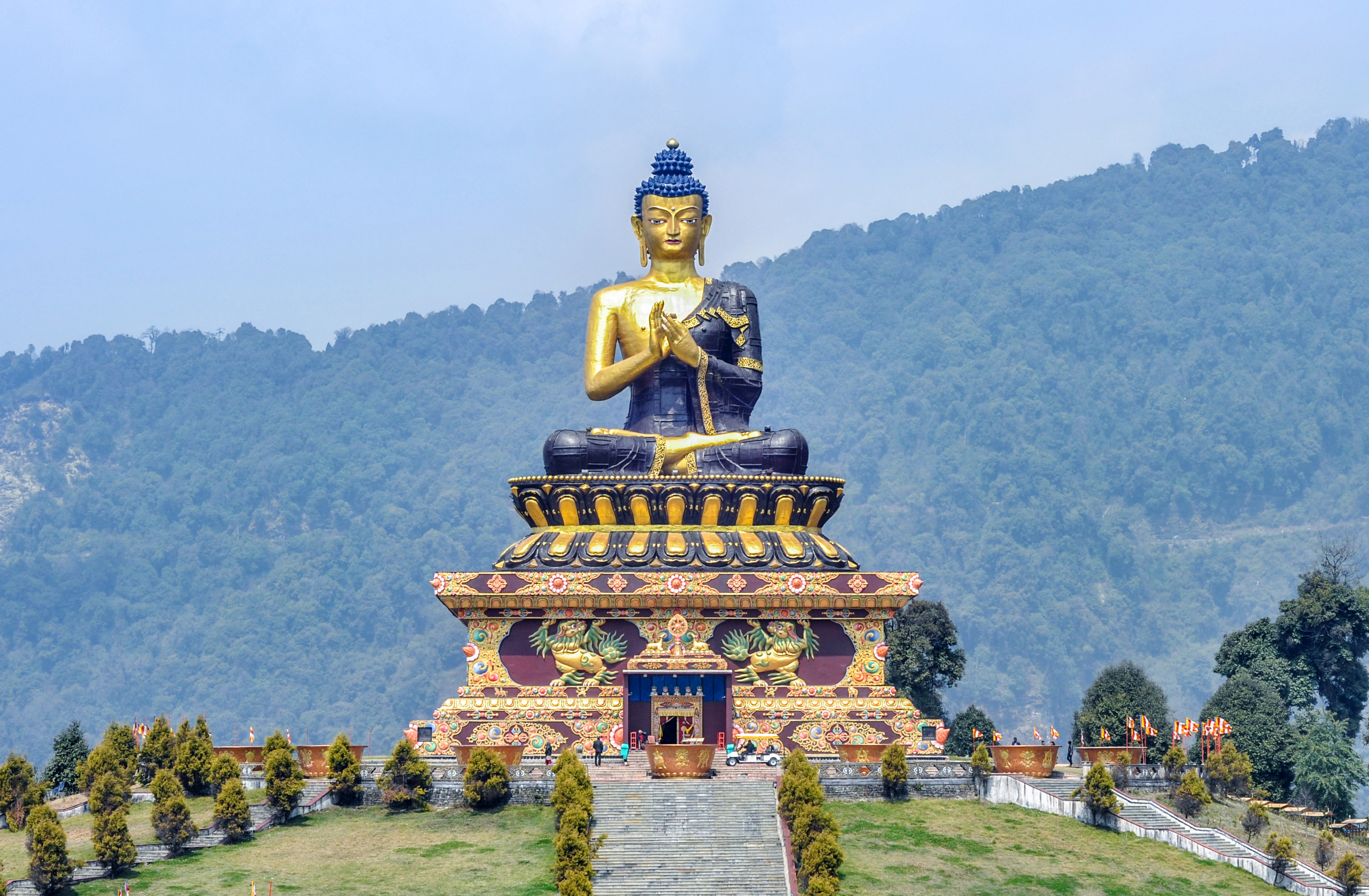
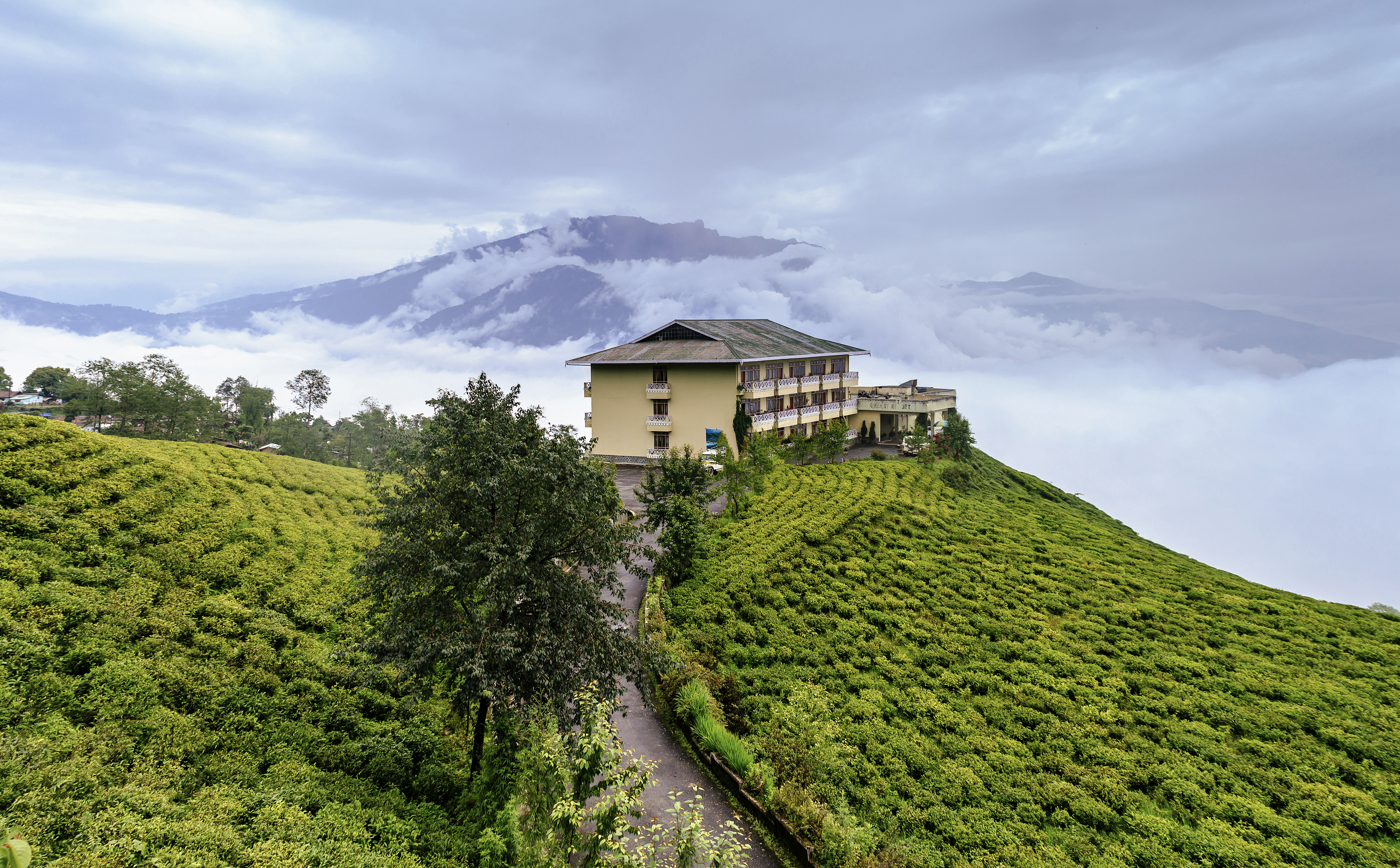
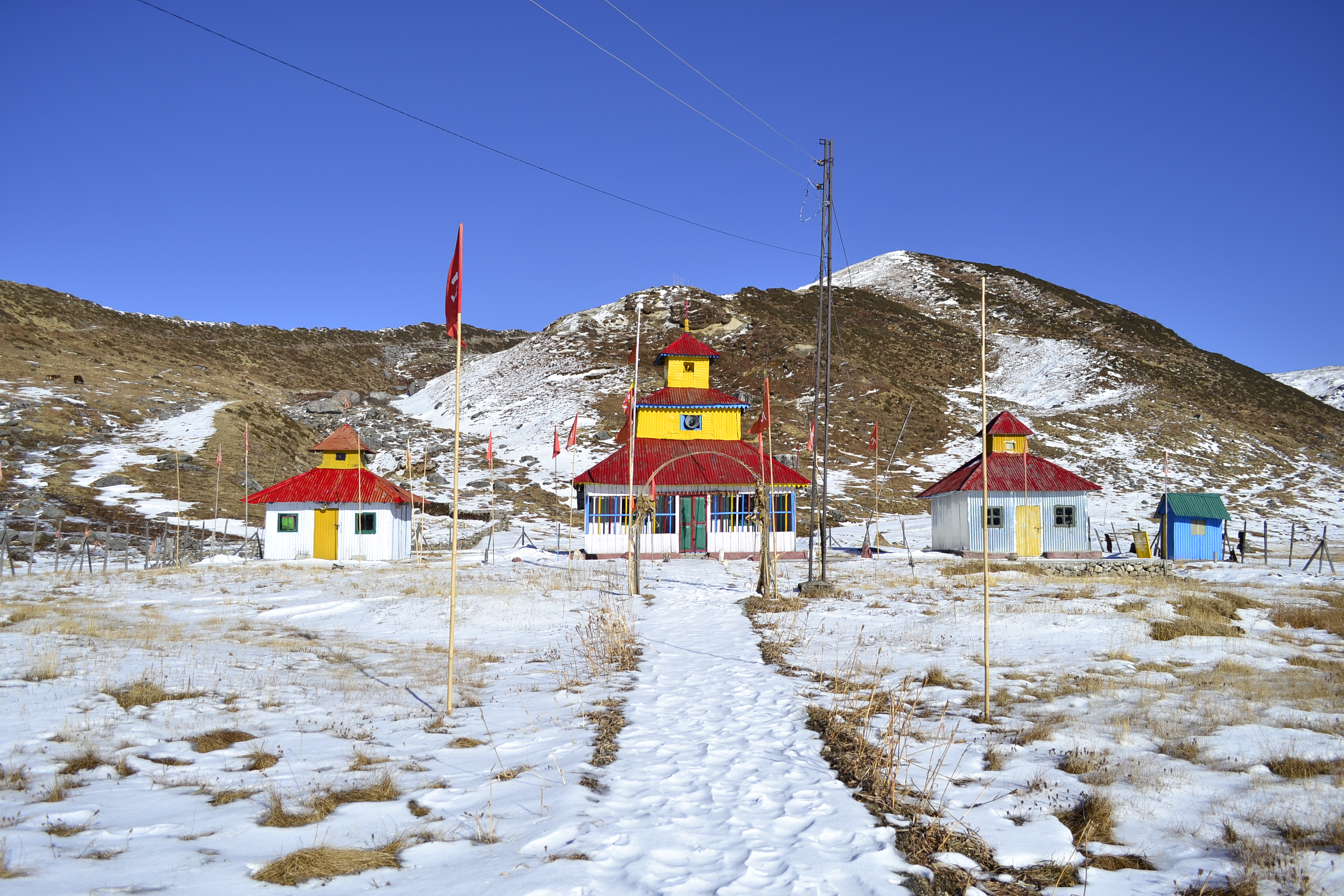
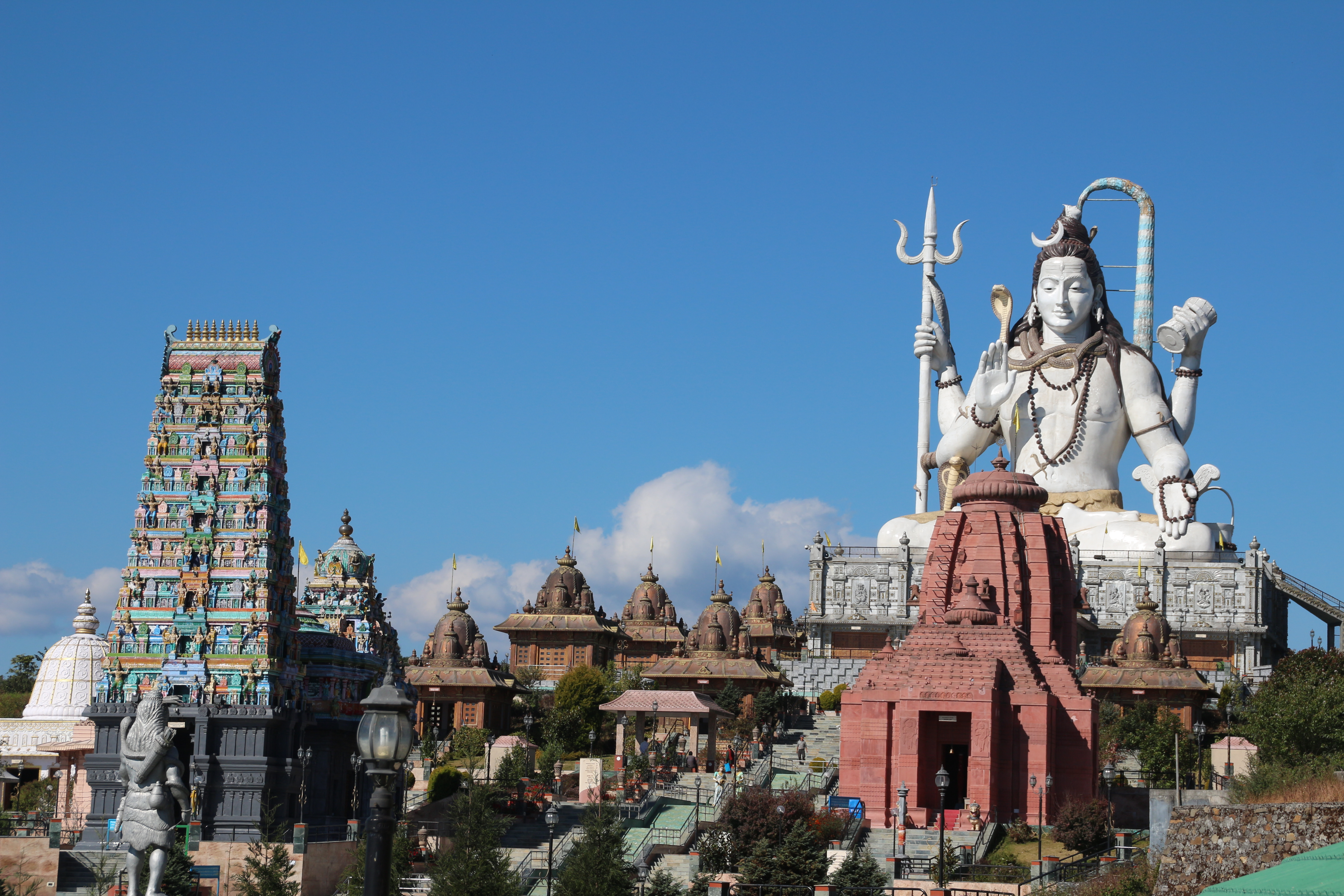
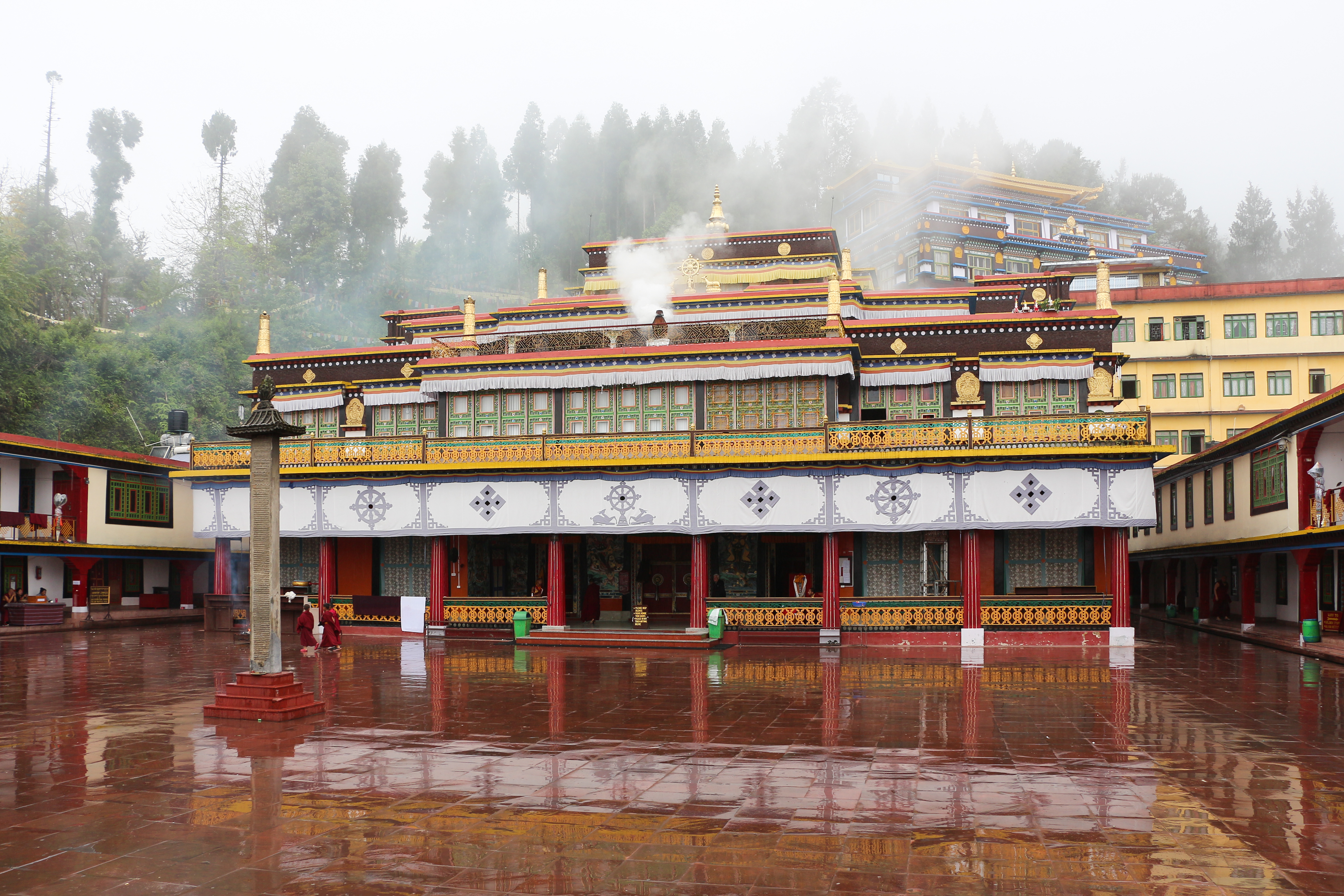
- Kanchenjunga range viewed from Hanuman Tok temple in Gangtok Gurudongmar Lake Buddha Park of Ravangla Temi Tea Garden Krishna Temple at Gnathang Shiva statue at Namchi Rumtek Monastery

- Emblem of Sikkim
- Etymology: New Palace
- Nickname: "Valley of Rice"
- Motto: Kham sum wangdu (Conqueror of the three worlds)
- Location of Sikkim in India
- Country: India
- Region: Northeast India
- Previously was: Kingdom of Sikkim
- Admission to union: 16 May 1975
- Capital and largest city: Gangtok
- Districts: 6

Government
  - Body: Government of Sikkim
  - Governor: Dushyant Kumar Gautam
  - Chief Minister: Prem Singh Tamang (SKM)

Area
  - Total: 7,096 km^{2} (2,740 sq mi)
  - Rank: 27th

Dimensions
  - Length: 116 km (72 mi)
  - Width: 65 km (40 mi)
- Highest elevation (Kangchenjunga): 8,586 m (28,169 ft)
- Lowest elevation (Teesta River): 280 m (920 ft)

Population (2011)
  - Total: ▲610,577
  - Rank: 32nd
  - Density: 86/km^{2} (220/sq mi)
  - Urban: 25.15%
  - Rural: 74.85%

Language
  - Official: Nepali (working) (Note: Nepali is recognised as one of the official languages of the state as per the Sikkim Official Languages Act, 1977. A 2024 notification by the state government accorded Nepali as the primary working language with respect to ensuring the access of government information and services to the citizens and the release of official notifications and gazettes along with English.); Sikkimese; Lepcha; Limbu; Newar; Rai; Gurung; Magar; Sherpa; Tamang; Sunwar; Bhujel
  - Additional official: English

GDP
  - Total (2025–26): ▲US$6.7 billion
  - Rank: 29th
  - Per capita: ▲₹707,181 (US$7,600) (1st)
- Time zone: UTC+05:30 (IST)
- ISO 3166 code: IN-SK
- Vehicle registration: SK
- HDI (2023): ▲0.755 high (9th)
- Literacy (2024): 84.7% (19th)
- Sex ratio (2011): 890♀/1000 ♂ (10th)
- Website: www.sikkim.gov.in
- Symbols of Sikkim
- Foundation day: Sikkim Day
- Bird: Blood pheasant
- Fish: Copper Mahseer
- Flower: Noble dendrobium
- Mammal: Red panda
- Tree: Rhododendron
- State highway mark
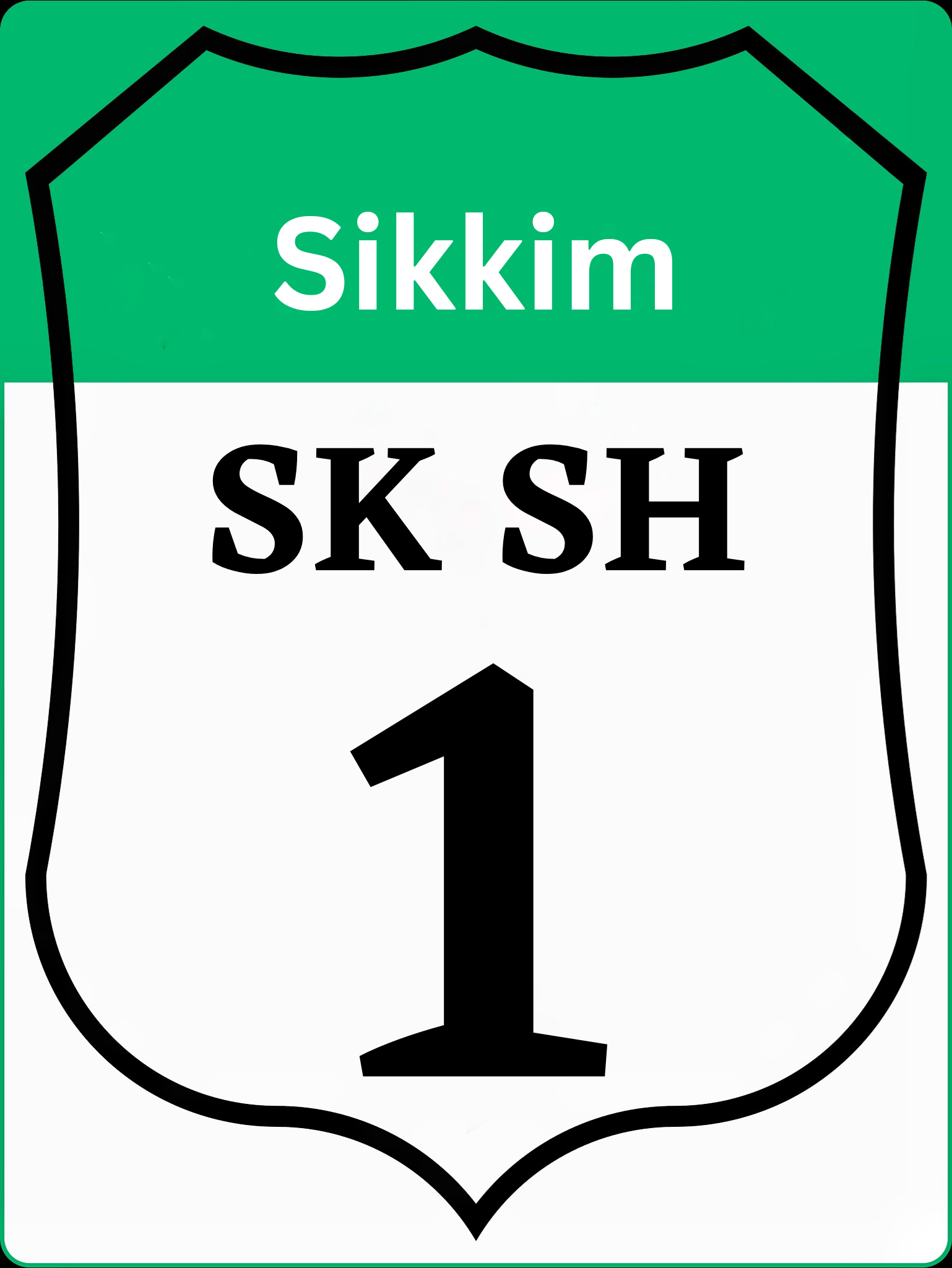
- State highway of Sikkim; SK SH1 – SK SH27
- List of Indian state symbols

Sikkim (/ˈsɪkɪm/ SIK-im; Nepali: [ˈsikːim]) is a state in northeast India. It borders Bhutan in the east, the Tibet Autonomous Region of China in the north and northeast, Koshi Province of Nepal in the west, and West Bengal in the south. Sikkim is one of the two Indian states that share their border with just one other Indian state — West Bengal. Sikkim is also close to the Siliguri Corridor, which borders Bangladesh, Nepal and Bhutan. Sikkim is the least populous and second-smallest among the Indian states. Situated in the Eastern Himalaya, Sikkim is notable for its biodiversity, including alpine and subtropical climates, as well as being a host to Kangchenjunga, the highest peak in India and third-highest on Earth. Sikkim's capital and largest city is Gangtok. Almost 35% of the state is covered by Khangchendzonga National Park – a UNESCO World Heritage Site.

The Kingdom of Sikkim was founded by the Namgyal dynasty in the 17th century. It was ruled by Buddhist priest-kings known as the Chogyal. It became a princely state of the British Indian Empire in 1890. Following Indian independence, Sikkim continued its protectorate status with the Union of India after 1947 and the Republic of India after 1950. It enjoyed the highest literacy rate and per capita income among Himalayan states. In 1973, anti-royalist riots took place in front of the Chogyal's palace. In 1975, after the Indian Army took over the city of Gangtok, a referendum was held that led to the dissolution of the monarchy and Sikkim's joining India as its 22nd state.

Modern Sikkim is a multiethnic and multilingual Indian state. The predominant religion is Hinduism, with a significant Vajrayana Buddhist minority. Sikkim's economy is largely dependent on agriculture and tourism. As of 2019, the state had the fifth-smallest GDP among Indian states, although it is also among the fastest-growing.

== Toponymy ==
The name Sikkim is believed to be a combination of the Limbu words su (ᤙᤢᤰ) "new" and khyim (ᤂᤡᤶ) "palace" or "house". The Tibetan name for Sikkim is Drenjong (འབྲས་ལྗོངས, Wylie transliteration: 'bras ljongs), which means "valley of rice", while the Bhutias call it Beyul Demazong, which means "the hidden valley of rice". According to folklore, after establishing Rabdentse as his new capital, Bhutia king Tensung Namgyal built a palace and asked his Limbu Queen to name it. The Lepcha people, the original inhabitants of Sikkim, called it Nye-mae-el, meaning "paradise". In historical Indian literature, Sikkim is known as Indrakil, the garden of the war god Indra.

== History ==
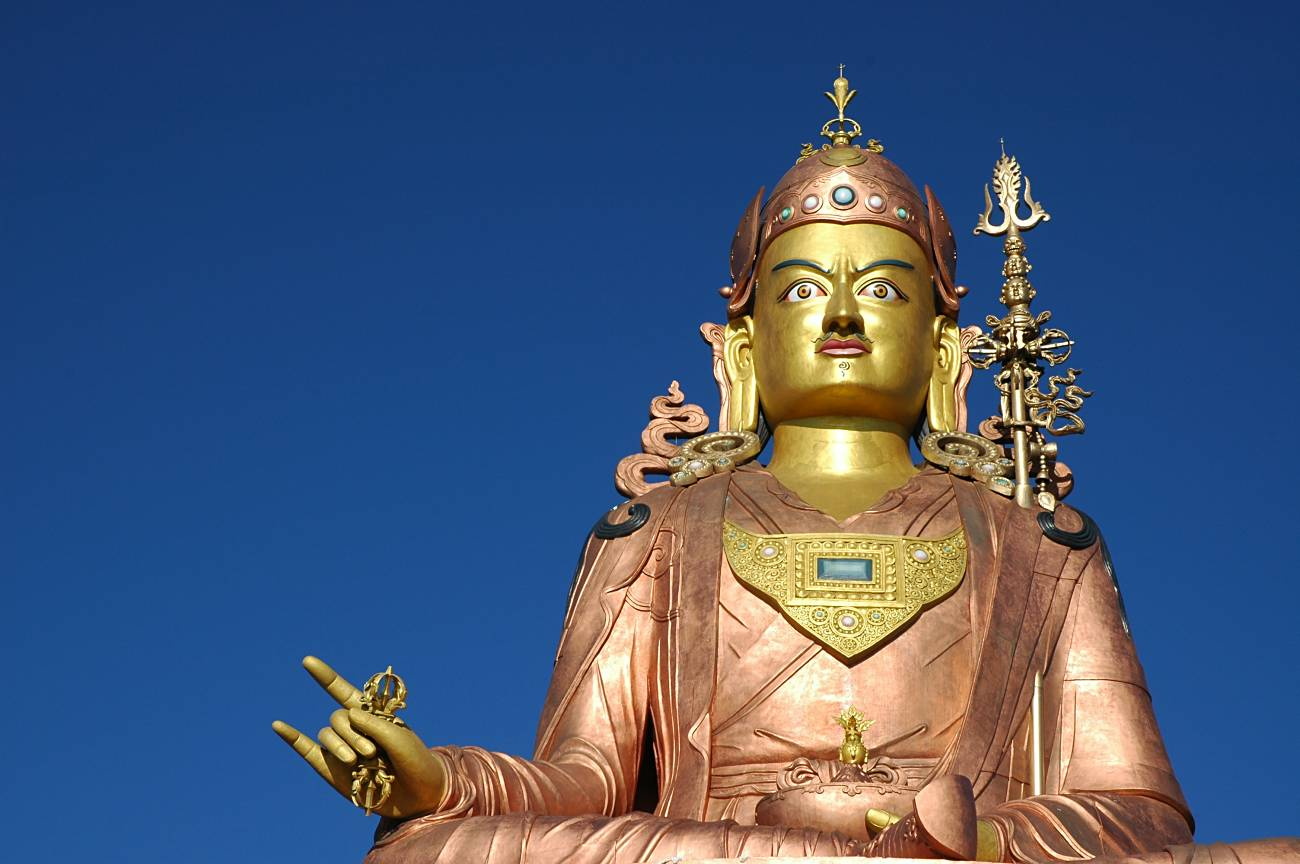
Statue of Padmasambhava, Samdrumptse

The Lepchas are considered to be the earliest inhabitants of Sikkim. However the Limbus and the Magars also lived in the inaccessible parts of West and South districts as early as the Lepchas perhaps lived in the East and North districts. The Buddhist saint Padmasambhava, also known as Guru Rinpoche, passed through the land in the 8th century. According to tradition, he is believed to have blessed the land, introduced Buddhism, and foretold the era of monarchy that would arrive in Sikkim centuries later.

=== Foundation of the monarchy ===
Flag of Sikkim during its independent monarchy.

According to legend, Khye Bumsa, a 14th-century prince from the Minyak House in Kham of Tibetan ancestry, received a divine revelation instructing him to travel south to seek his fortunes. A fifth-generation descendant of Khye Bumsa, Phuntsog Namgyal, became the founder of Sikkim's monarchy in 1642, when he was consecrated as the first Chogyal, or priest-king, of Sikkim by the three venerated lamas at Yuksom. Phuntsog Namgyal was succeeded in 1670 by his son, Tensung Namgyal, who moved the capital from Yuksom to Rabdentse (near modern Pelling). In 1700, Sikkim was invaded by the Bhutanese with the help of the half-sister of the Chogyal, who had been denied the throne. The Bhutanese were driven away by the Tibetans, who restored the throne to the Chogyal ten years later. Between 1717 and 1733, the kingdom faced many raids by the Nepalese in the west and Bhutanese in the east, culminating with the destruction of the capital Rabdentse by the Nepalese. In 1791, the Dalai Lama sent troops to support Sikkim and defend Tibet against the Gorkha Kingdom. Following the subsequent defeat of the Gorkha, an alliance of Sino-Tibetans established control over Sikkim.

=== During the British Raj ===
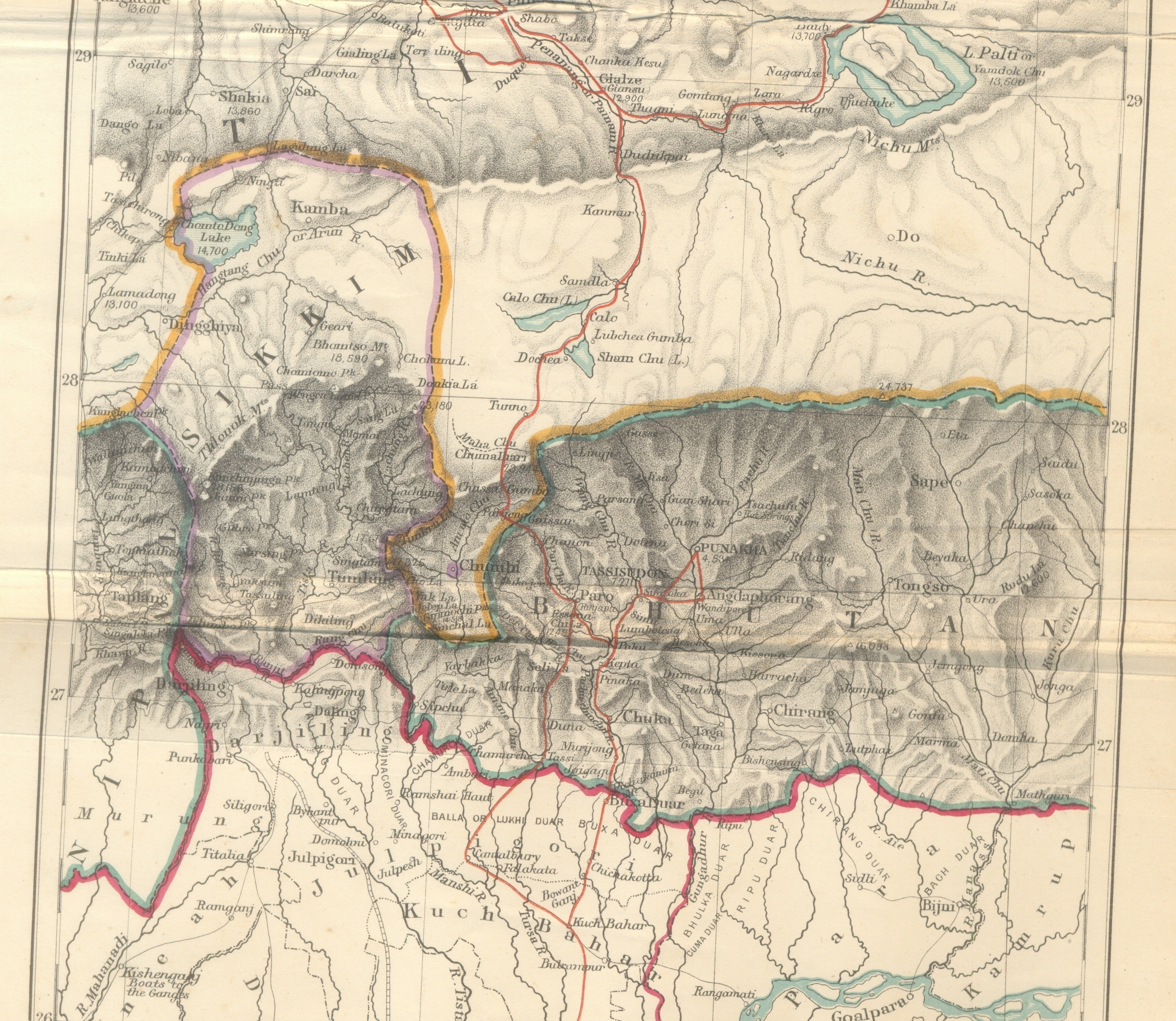
An 1876 map of Sikkim, depicting Chomto Dong Lake in northern Sikkim. However, the whole of Chumbi and Darjeeling are not depicted as part of Sikkim in the map.

Following the beginning of British rule of neighbouring India, Sikkim allied with Britain against their common adversary, Nepal. The Nepalese attacked Sikkim, overrunning most of the region, including the Terai. This prompted the British East India Company to attack Nepal, resulting in the Gurkha War of 1814. Treaties signed between Sikkim and Nepal resulted in the return of the territory annexed by the Nepalese in 1817. However, ties between Sikkim and the British weakened when the latter began taxation of the Morang region. In 1849, two British physicians, Sir Joseph Dalton Hooker and Archibald Campbell, the latter being the superintendent of Darjeeling, ventured into the mountains of Sikkim with the prior permission of King Tsugphu Namgyal. An influential Dewan detained the doctors, leading to a punitive British expedition against the kingdom, after which the Darjeeling district and Morang were annexed to British India in 1853. The Chogyal of Sikkim became a titular ruler under the directive of the British governor as a result of the invasion.

Sikkim became a British protectorate in the later decades of the 19th century, formalised by a convention signed with China in 1890. Sikkim was gradually granted more sovereignty over the next three decades, and became a member of the Chamber of Princes, the assembly representing the rulers of the Indian princely states, in 1922.

=== Indian protectorate ===
Prior to Indian independence, Jawaharlal Nehru, as the Vice-President of the Executive Council, pushed through a resolution in the Indian Constituent Assembly to the effect that Sikkim and Bhutan, as Himalayan states, were not 'Indian states' and their future should be negotiated separately. A standstill agreement was signed in February 1948.

Meanwhile, Indian independence and its move to democracy spurred a fledgling political movement in Sikkim, giving rise to the formation of Sikkim State Congress (SSC), a pro-accession political party. The party sent a plate of demands to the palace, including a demand for accession to India. The palace attempted to defuse the movement by appointing three secretaries from the SSC to the government and sponsoring a counter-movement in the name of Sikkim National Party, which opposed accession to India.

The demand for responsible government continued, and the SSC launched a civil disobedience movement. The Chogyal Palden Thondup Namgyal asked India for help in quelling the movement, which was offered in the form of a small military police force and an Indian Dewan. In 1950, a treaty was agreed between India and Sikkim, which gave Sikkim the status of an Indian protectorate. Sikkim came under the suzerainty of India, which controlled its external affairs, defence, diplomacy and communications. In other respects, Sikkim retained administrative autonomy.

A state council was established in 1953 to allow for constitutional government under the Chogyal. Chogyal Palden Thondup Namgyal was able to preserve autonomy and shape a "model Asian state" where the literacy rate and per capita income were twice as high as neighbouring Nepal, Bhutan and India. Meanwhile, the Sikkim National Congress demanded fresh elections and greater representation for Nepalis in Sikkim. People marched on the palace against the monarchy. In 1973, anti-royalist agitations took place, which needed to be quelled using Indian security forces.

=== Merger and statehood ===
In 1975, the Prime Minister of Sikkim, Kazi Lhendup Dorjee, appealed to the Indian Prime Minister, Indira Gandhi, for Sikkim to become a state of India. In April of that year, the Indian Army took over the city of Gangtok and disarmed the Chogyal's palace guards. Thereafter, a referendum was held in which 97.5 percent of voters supported abolishing the monarchy, effectively approving union with India. India is said to have stationed 20,000–40,000 troops in a country of only 200,000 during the referendum. On 16 May 1975, Sikkim became the 22nd state of the Indian Union. The monarchy was abolished. To enable the incorporation of the new state, the Indian Parliament amended the Indian Constitution. First, the 35th Amendment laid down a set of conditions that made Sikkim an "Associate State", a special designation not used by any other state. A month later, the 36th Amendment repealed the 35th Amendment, and made Sikkim a full state, adding its name to the First Schedule of the Constitution.

=== Recent history ===
In 2000, the seventeenth Karmapa, Urgyen Trinley Dorje, who had been confirmed by the Dalai Lama and accepted as a tulku by the Chinese government, escaped from Tibet, seeking to return to the Rumtek Monastery in Sikkim. Chinese officials were in a dilemma on this issue, for any protests to India would mean an explicit endorsement of India's governance of Sikkim, which China still recognised as an independent state occupied by India. The Chinese government eventually recognised Sikkim as an Indian state after 2003, leading to a thaw in Sino-Indian relations. On 6 July 2006, the Sikkimese Himalayan pass of Nathu La was opened to cross-border trade, becoming the first open border between India and China. The pass, which was first opened during the 1904 Younghusband Expedition to Tibet, had remained closed since the 1962 Sino-Indian War.

On 18 September 2011, a magnitude 6.9M_{w} earthquake struck Sikkim, killing at least 116 people in the state and in Nepal, Bhutan, Bangladesh and Tibet. More than 60 people died in Sikkim alone, and the city of Gangtok suffered significant damage.

== Geography ==
Kangchenjunga
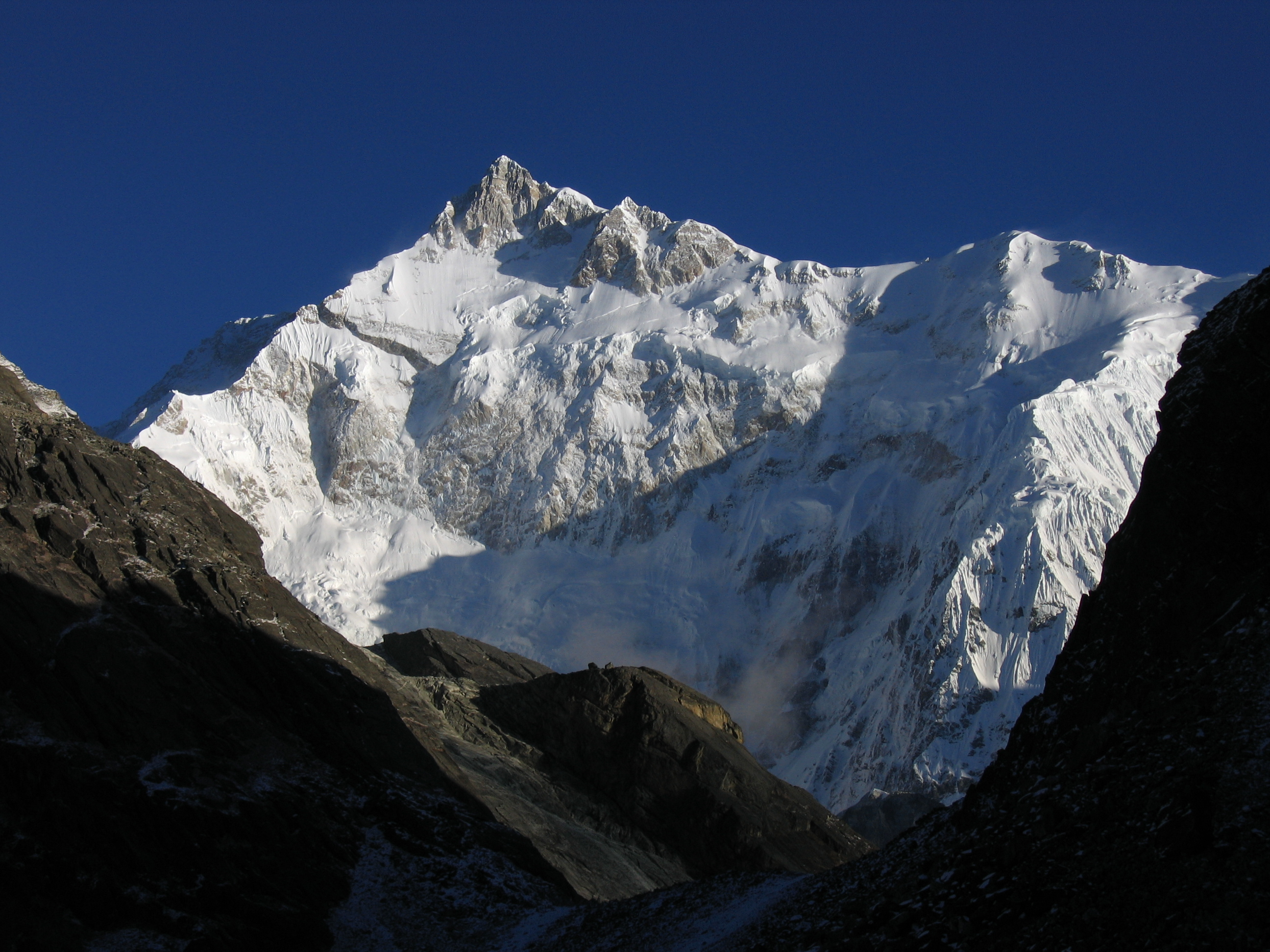
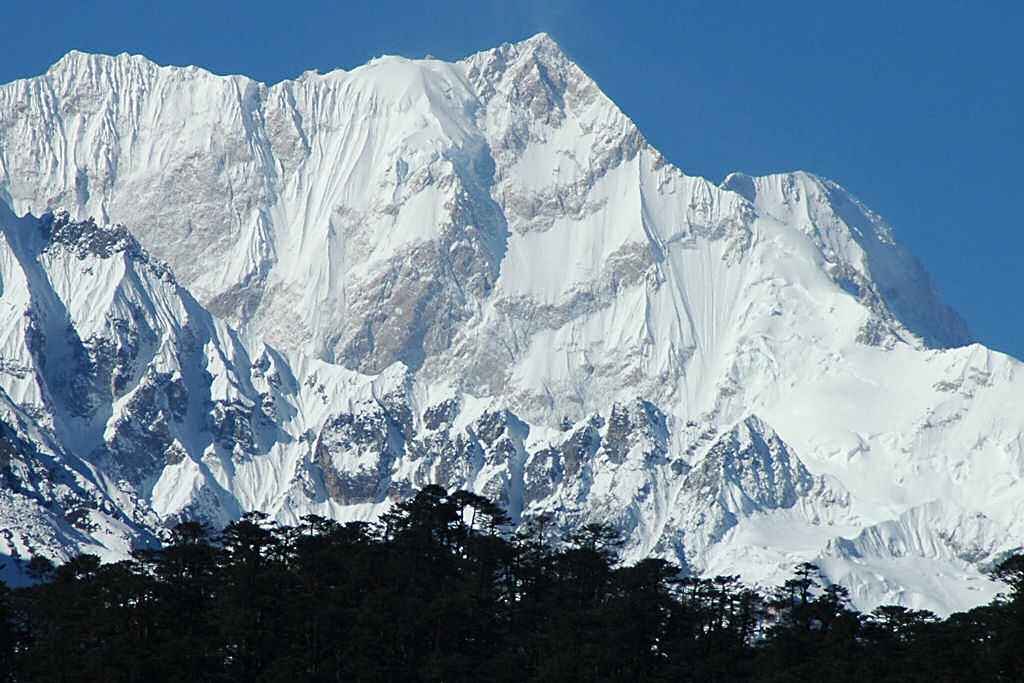
Kangchenjunga, the third highest mountain in the world, near the Zemu Glacier.

Situated in the Himalayan mountains, the state of Sikkim is characterised by mountainous terrain. Almost the entire state is hilly, with an elevation ranging from 280 metres (920 ft) in the south at the border with West Bengal to 8,586 metres (28,169 ft) in the northern peaks near Nepal and Tibet. The summit of Kangchenjunga, the world's third-highest peak, is the state's highest point, situated on the border between Sikkim and Nepal. For the most part, the land is unfit for agriculture because of the rocky, precipitous slopes. However, some hill slopes have been converted into terrace farms.

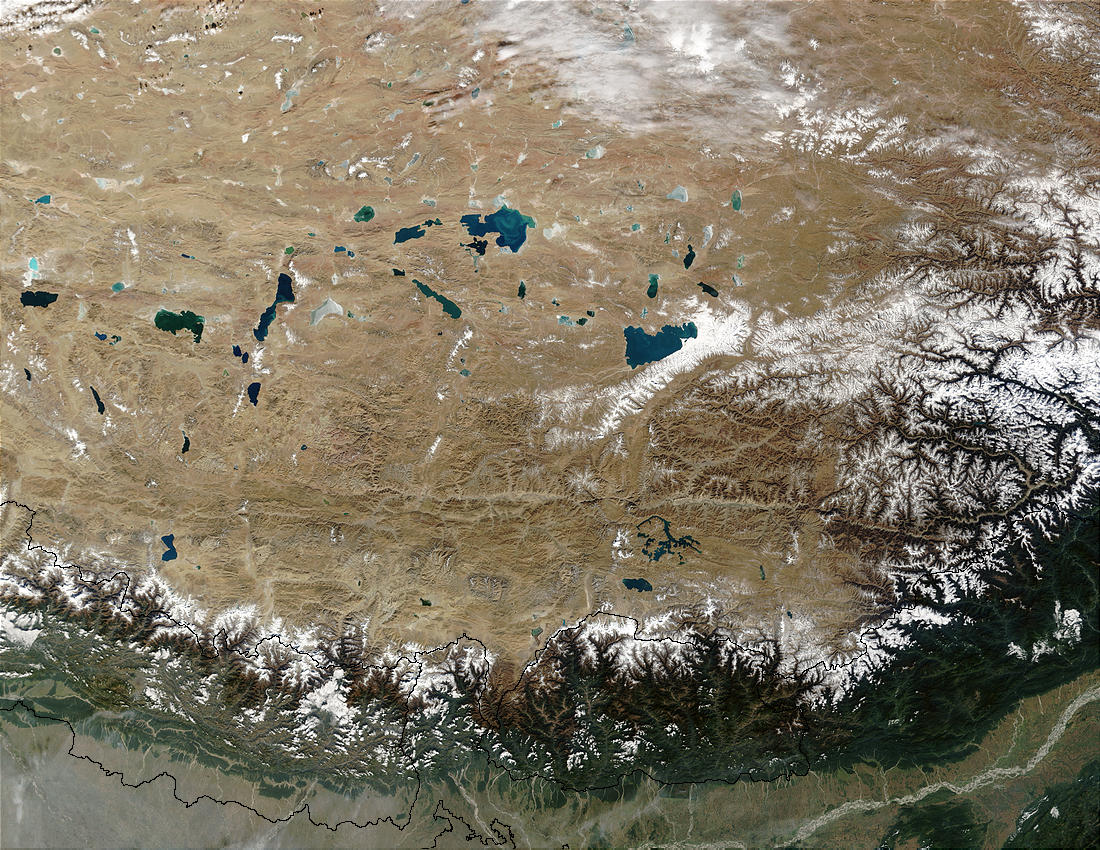
Sikkim is in lower center of image of the Tibetan Plateau- (NASA Satellite photo).

Numerous snow-fed streams have carved out river valleys in the west and south of the state. These streams combine into the major Teesta River and its tributary, the Rangeet, which flow through the state from north to south. About a third of the state is heavily forested. The Himalayan mountains surround the northern, eastern, and western borders of Sikkim. The Lower Himalayas, lying in the southern reaches of the state, are the most densely populated.

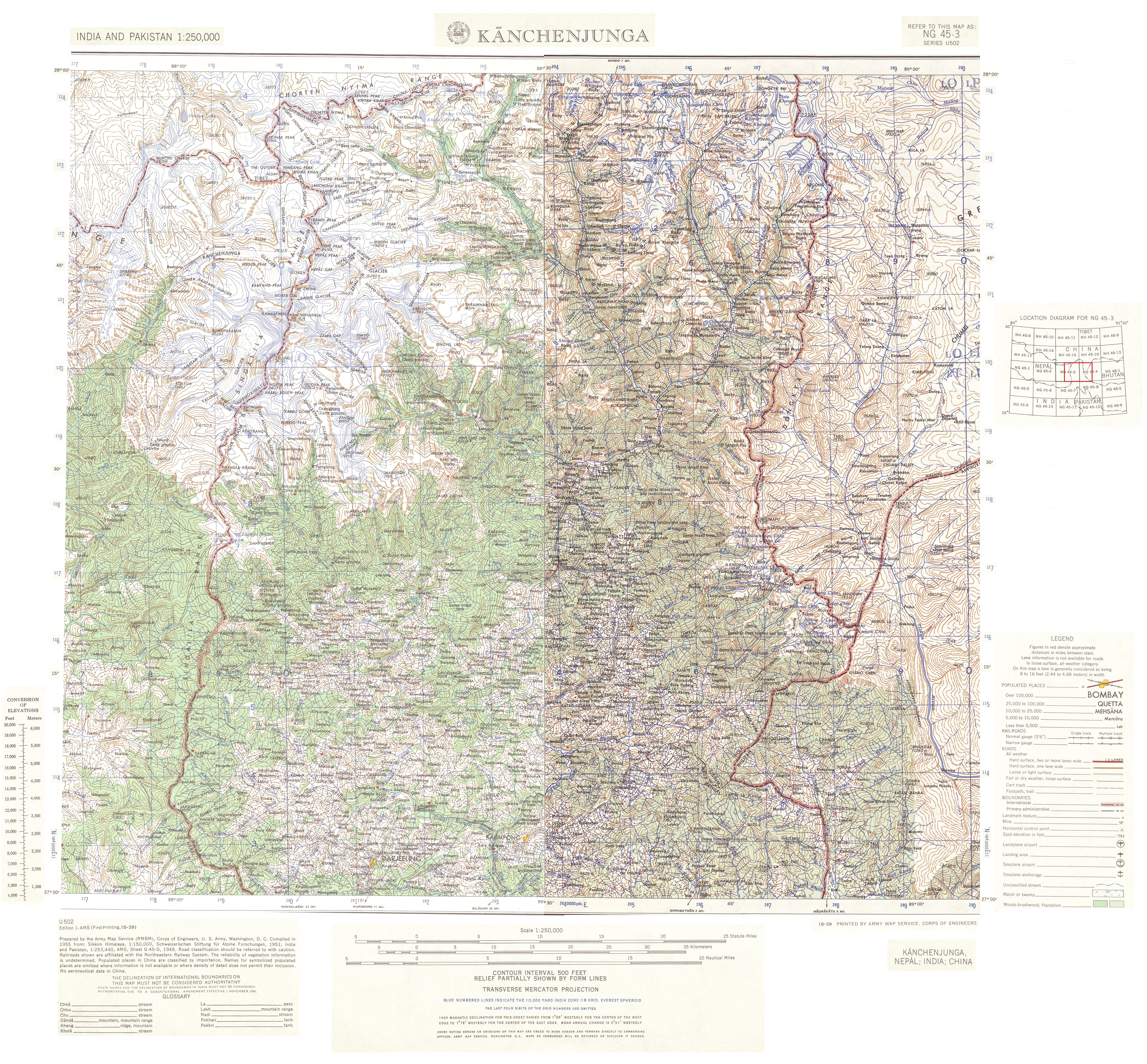
Detailed 1:250k scale, 1955 US Army map of Sikkim showing major river valleys, glaciers, lakes, peaks (height in feet) and Mines. One could see more concentration of glaciers at the north-western part of Sikkim around Kangchenjunga (28,168 feet (8,586 m)).

The state has 28 mountain peaks, more than 80 glaciers, 227 high-altitude lakes (including the Tsongmo, Gurudongmar and Khecheopalri Lakes), five major hot springs, and more than 100 rivers and streams. Eight mountain passes connect the state to Tibet, Bhutan, and Nepal.

Sikkim's hot springs are renowned for their medicinal and therapeutic value. Among the state's most notable hot springs are those at Phurchachu, Yumthang, Borang, Ralang, Taram-chu, and Yumey Samdong. The springs, which have a high sulphur content, are located near river banks; some are known to emit hydrogen. The average temperature of the water in these hot springs is 50 °C (122 °F).

=== Geology ===
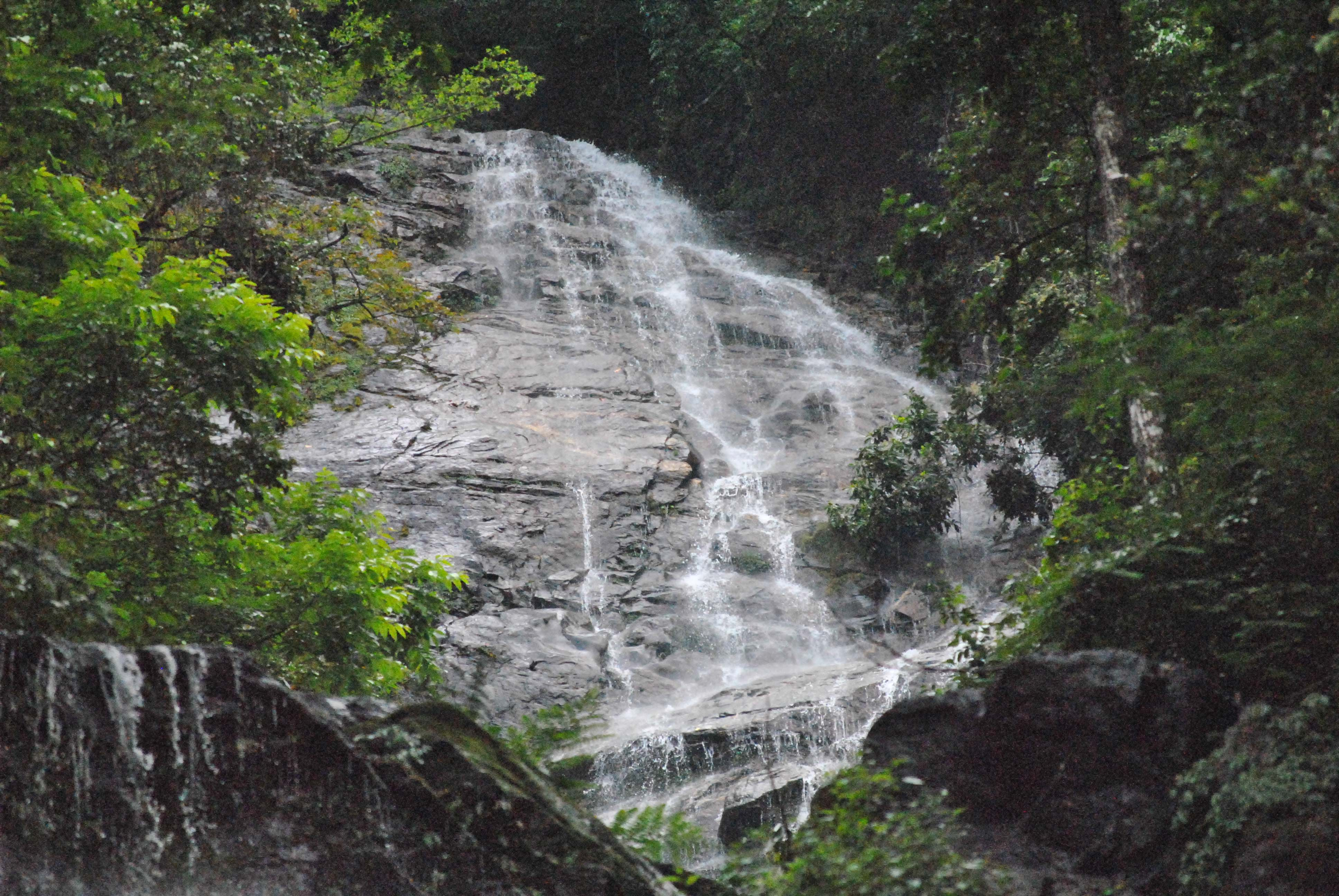
A waterfall in Sikkim

The hills of Sikkim mainly consist of gneiss and schist which weather to produce generally poor and shallow brown clay soils. The soil is coarse, with large concentrations of iron oxide; it ranges from neutral to acidic and is lacking in organic and mineral nutrients. This type of soil tends to support evergreen and deciduous forests.

The rock consists of phyllites and schists, and is highly susceptible to weathering and erosion. This, combined with the state's heavy rainfall, causes extensive soil erosion and the loss of soil nutrients through leaching. As a result, landslides are frequent, often isolating rural towns and villages from the major urban centres.

=== Climate ===
The state has five seasons: winter, summer, spring, autumn, and monsoon season. Sikkim's climate ranges from sub-tropical in the south to tundra in the north. Most of the inhabited regions of Sikkim experience a temperate climate, with temperatures seldom exceeding 28 °C (82 °F) in summer. The average annual temperature for most of Sikkim is around 18 °C (64 °F).

Sikkim is one of the few states in India to receive regular snowfall. The snow line ranges from 6,100 metres (20,000 ft) in the south of the state to 4,900 metres (16,100 ft) in the north. The tundra-type region in the north is snowbound for four months every year, and the temperature drops below 0 °C (32 °F) almost every night. In north-western Sikkim, the peaks are frozen year-round; because of the high altitude, temperatures in the mountains can drop to as low as −40 °C (−40 °F) in winter.

During the monsoon, heavy rains increase the risk of landslides. The record for the longest period of continuous rain in Sikkim is 11 days. Fog affects many parts of the state during winter and the monsoons, making transportation perilous.

=== Flora and fauna ===
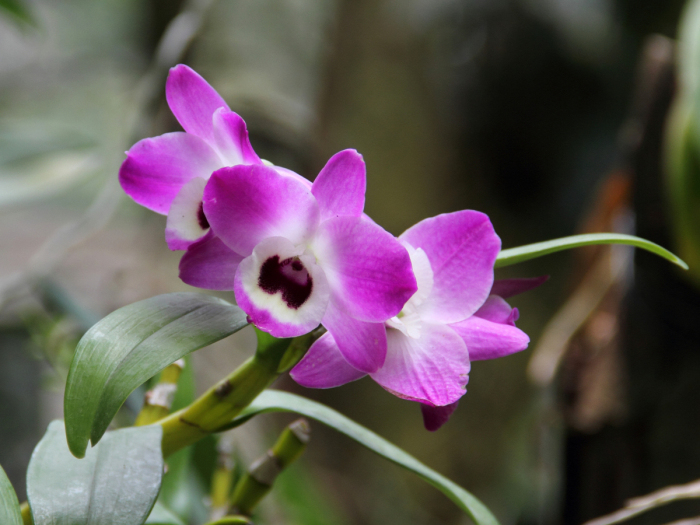
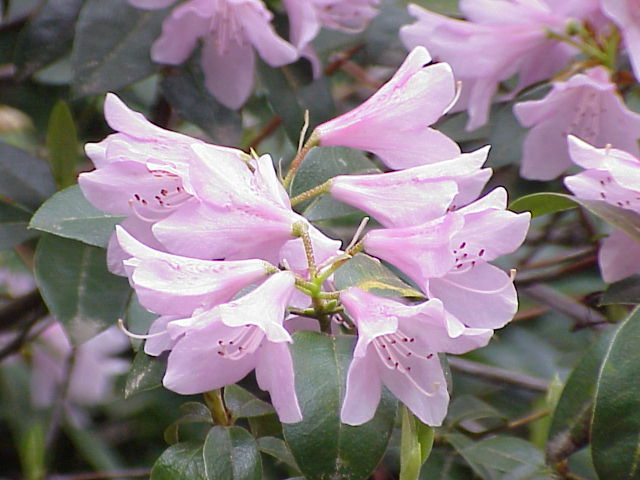
Noble orchid (top) is Sikkim's state flower. Rhododendron is its state tree; about 40 species of rhododendron bloom late April – mid May across the state.

Sikkim is situated in an ecological hotspot of the lower Himalayas, one of only three among the ecoregions of India. The forested regions of the state exhibit a diverse range of fauna and flora. Owing to its altitudinal gradation, the state has a wide variety of plants, from tropical species to temperate, alpine, and tundra ones. It is perhaps one of the few regions to exhibit such a diversity within such a small area. Nearly 81 percent of the area of Sikkim comes under the administration of its forest department.

Sikkim is home to around 5,000 species of flowering plants, 515 rare orchids, 60 primula species, 36 rhododendron species, 11 oak varieties, 23 bamboo varieties, 16 conifer species, 362 types of ferns and ferns allies, 8 tree ferns, and over 900 medicinal plants. A relative of the Poinsettia, locally known as "Christmas Flower", can be found in abundance in the mountainous state. The Noble Dendrobium is the official flower of Sikkim, while the rhododendron is the state tree.

Orchids, figs, laurel, bananas, sal trees and bamboo grow in the Himalayan subtropical broadleaf forests of the lower altitudes of Sikkim. In the temperate elevations above 1,500 metres (4,900 ft) there are Eastern Himalayan broadleaf forests, where oaks, chestnuts, maples, birches, alders, and magnolias grow in large numbers, as well as Himalayan subtropical pine forests, dominated by Chir pine. Alpine-type vegetation is typically found between an altitude of 3,500 to 5,000 metres (11,500 to 16,400 ft). In lower elevations are found juniper, pine, firs, cypresses, and rhododendrons from the Eastern Himalayan subalpine conifer forests. Higher up are Eastern Himalayan alpine shrub and meadows and high-altitude wetlands, which are home to a wide variety of rhododendrons and wildflowers.

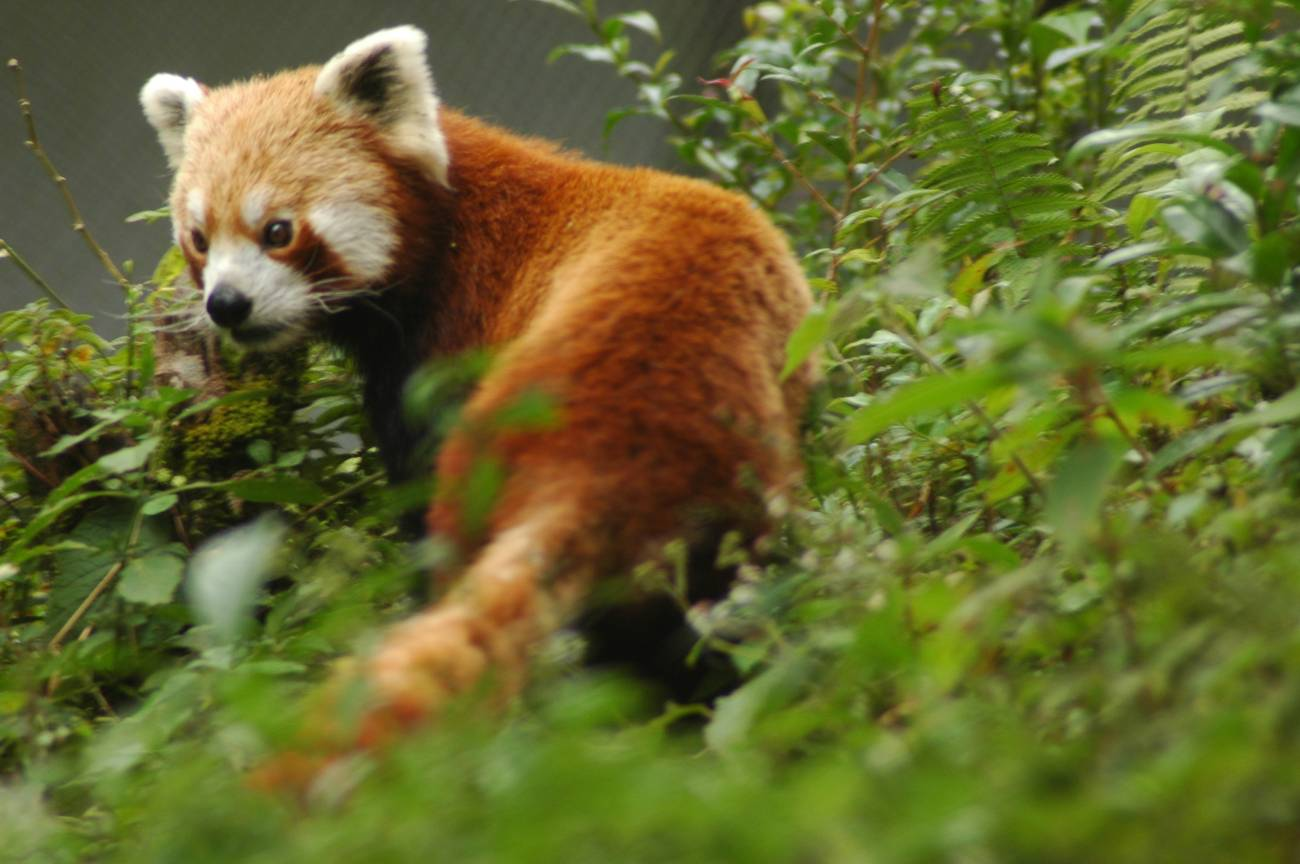
The red panda is the state animal of Sikkim.

The fauna of Sikkim includes the snow leopard, musk deer, Himalayan tahr, red panda, Himalayan marmot, Himalayan serow, Himalayan goral, muntjac, common langur, Asian black bear, clouded leopard, marbled cat, leopard cat, dhole, Tibetan wolf, hog badger, binturong, and Himalayan jungle cat. Among the animals more commonly found in the alpine zone are yaks, mainly reared for their milk, meat, and as a beast of burden.

The avifauna of Sikkim include the impeyan pheasant, crimson horned pheasant, snow partridge, Tibetan snowcock, bearded vulture and griffon vulture, as well as golden eagles, quails, plovers, woodcocks, sandpipers, pigeons, Old World flycatchers, babblers and robins. Sikkim has more than 550 species of birds, some of which have been declared endangered.

Sikkim also has a rich diversity of arthropods, many of which remain unstudied. Some of the most understudied species are Sikkimese arthropods, specifically butterflies. Of the approximately 1,438 butterfly species found in the Indian subcontinent, 695 have been recorded in Sikkim. These include the endangered Kaiser-i-hind, the Yellow Gorgon and the Bhutan Glory.

==== National Parks and Wildlife Sanctuaries ====
List of National Parks and Wildlife Sanctuaries of Sikkim:

- Khangchendzonga National Park
- Pangolakha Wildlife Sanctuary
- Fambong Lho Wildlife Sanctuary
- Kyongnosla Alpine Sanctuary
- Maenam Wildlife Sanctuary
- Barsey Rhododendron Sanctuary
- Shingba Rhododendron Sanctuary
- Kitam Bird Sanctuary
- Sling Dong Faireanum Orchid Conservation Reserve

== Government and politics ==
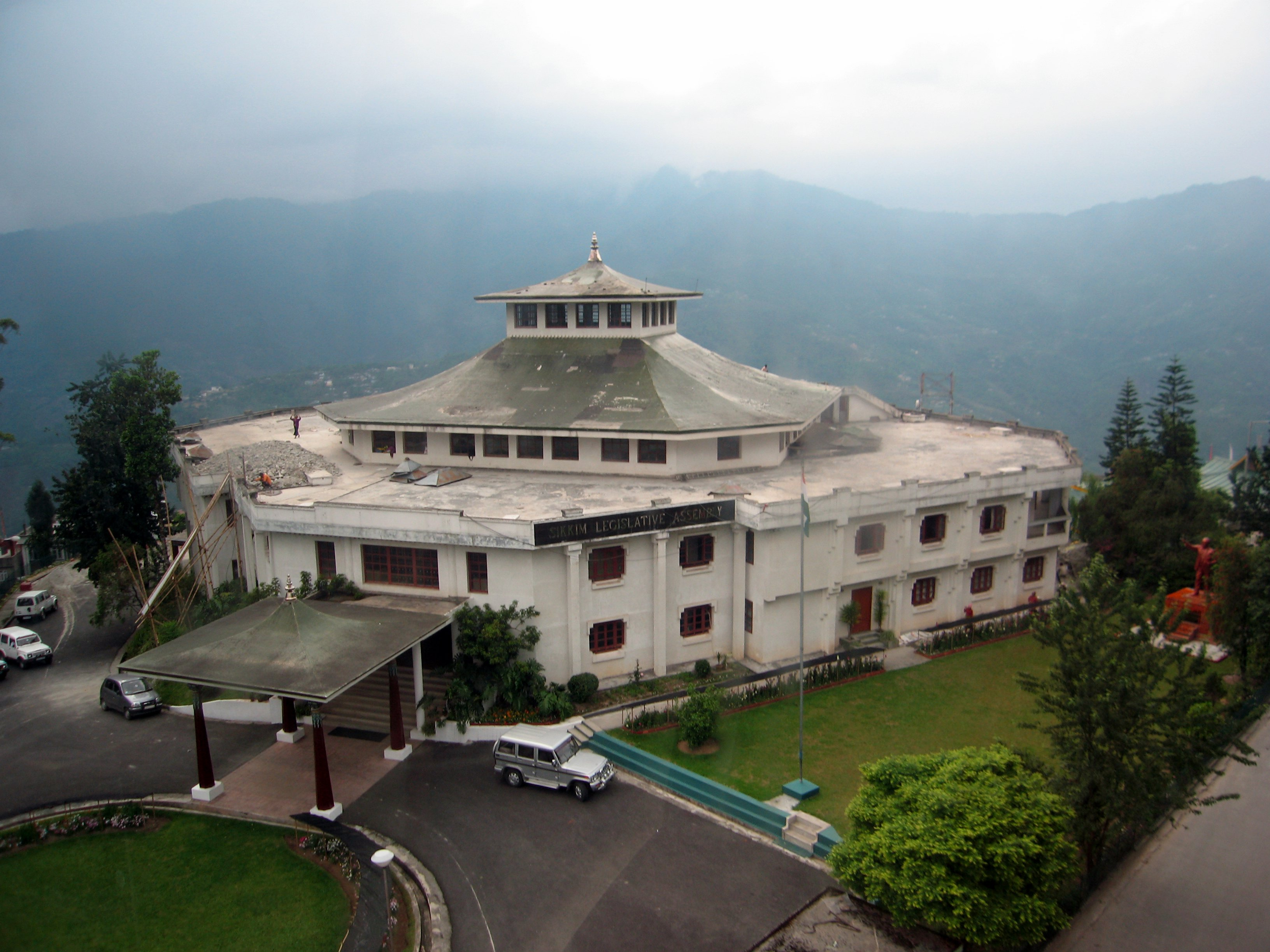
Sikkim Legislative Assembly

According to the Constitution of India, Sikkim has a parliamentary system of representative democracy for its governance; universal suffrage is granted to state residents. The government structure is organised into three branches:

- Executive: As with all states of India, a governor stands at the head of the executive power of the state, just as the president is the head of the executive power in the Union, and is appointed by the President of India. The governor's appointment is largely ceremonial, and their main role is to oversee the swearing-in of the chief minister. The chief minister, who holds the real executive powers, is the head of the party or coalition garnering the largest majority in the state elections. The governor also appoints cabinet ministers on the advice of the chief minister.
- Legislature: Sikkim has a unicameral legislature, the Sikkim Legislative Assembly, like most other Indian states. Its state assembly has 32 seats, including one reserved for the Sangha. Sikkim is allocated one seat in each of the two chambers of India's national bicameral legislature, the Lok Sabha and the Rajya Sabha.
- Judiciary: The judiciary consists of the Sikkim High Court and a system of lower courts. The High Court, located at Gangtok, has a Chief Justice along with two permanent justices. The Sikkim High Court is the smallest state high court in the country.

In 1975, after the abrogation of Sikkim's monarchy, the Indian National Congress gained a majority in the 1977 elections. In 1979, after a period of instability, a popular ministry headed by Nar Bahadur Bhandari, leader of the Sikkim Sangram Parishad Party, was sworn in. Bhandari held on to power in the 1984 and 1989 elections. In the 1994 elections, Pawan Kumar Chamling of the Sikkim Democratic Front became the Chief Minister of the state. Chamling and his party had since held on to power by winning the 1999, 2004, 2009, and 2014 elections. However, the 2019 legislative assembly elections were won by the Sikkim Krantikari Morcha party and the chief minister since then is Prem Singh Tamang. He was re-elected in 2024. The current Governor of Sikkim is Om Prakash Mathur.

Sikkim is among India's most environmentally conscious states, having banned plastic water bottles "in all government functions and meetings" and polystyrene products (throughout the state).

=== Subdivisions ===
Sikkim has six districts – Gangtok District, Mangan District, Namchi District, Pakyong District, Geyzing District and Soreng District. The district capitals are Gangtok, Mangan, Namchi, Pakyong, Gyalshing and Soreng respectively. These six districts are further divided into 16 subdivisions; Pakyong, Rongli, Rangpo and Gangtok are the subdivisions of the Gangtok and Pakyong Districts. Soreng, Yuksom, Gyalshing, and Dentam are the subdivisions of the Geyzing and Soreng district. Chungthang, Dzongu, Kabi, and Mangan are the subdivisions of the Mangan district. Ravongla, Jorethang, Namchi, and Yangyang are the subdivisions of the Namchi district.

Each of Sikkim's districts is overseen by a state government appointee, the district collector, who is in charge of the administration of the civilian areas of the district. The Indian Army has control over a large part of the state, as Sikkim forms part of a sensitive border area with China. Many areas are restricted to foreigners, and official permits are needed to visit them.

== Economy ==
Sikkim's nominal state gross domestic product (GDP) was estimated at US$4.6 billion in 2019, with GDP per capita being $7,530 (₹ 5,50,000), thus constituting the third-smallest GDP among India's 28 states. The state's economy is largely agrarian based on the terraced farming of rice and the cultivation of crops such as maize, millet, wheat, barley, oranges, tea, and cardamom. Sikkim produces more cardamom than any other Indian state and is home to the largest cultivated area of cardamom. Sikkim achieved its ambition to convert its agriculture to fully organic between 2003 and 2016, and became the first state in India to achieve this distinction.

Because of its hilly terrain and poor transport infrastructure, Sikkim lacks a large-scale industrial base. Brewing, distilling, tanning, and watchmaking are the main industries and are mainly located in the southern regions of the state, primarily in the towns of Melli and Jorethang. In addition, a small mining industry exists in Sikkim extracting minerals such as copper, dolomite, talc, graphite, quartzite, coal, zinc, and lead. Despite the state's minimal industrial infrastructure, Sikkim's economy has been among the fastest-growing in India since 2000; the state's GDP expanded by 89.93% in 2010 alone. In 2003, Sikkim decided to fully convert to organic farming and achieved this goal in 2015 becoming India's first "organic state".

In recent years, the government of Sikkim has extensively promoted tourism. As a result, state revenue has increased 14 times since the mid-1990s. Sikkim has furthermore invested in a fledgling gambling industry promoting both casinos and online gambling. The state's first casino, the Casino Sikkim, opened in March 2009. In the year 2010, the government subsequently issued three gambling licences for casinos and online sports betting in general. The Playwin lottery has been a notable success in the state.

The opening of the Nathu La pass on 6 July 2006, connecting Lhasa, Tibet, to India, was billed as a boon for Sikkim's economy. Trade through the pass remains hampered by Sikkim's limited infrastructure and government restrictions in both India and China, though the volume of traded goods has been steadily increasing.

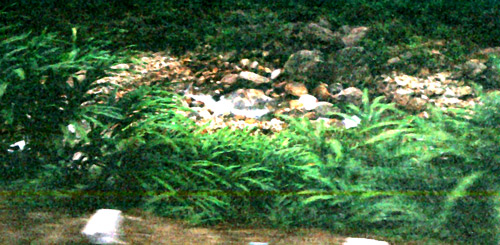
Elaichi, or cardamom, is the chief cash crop of Sikkim.

Tea garden at Temi, Sikkim.

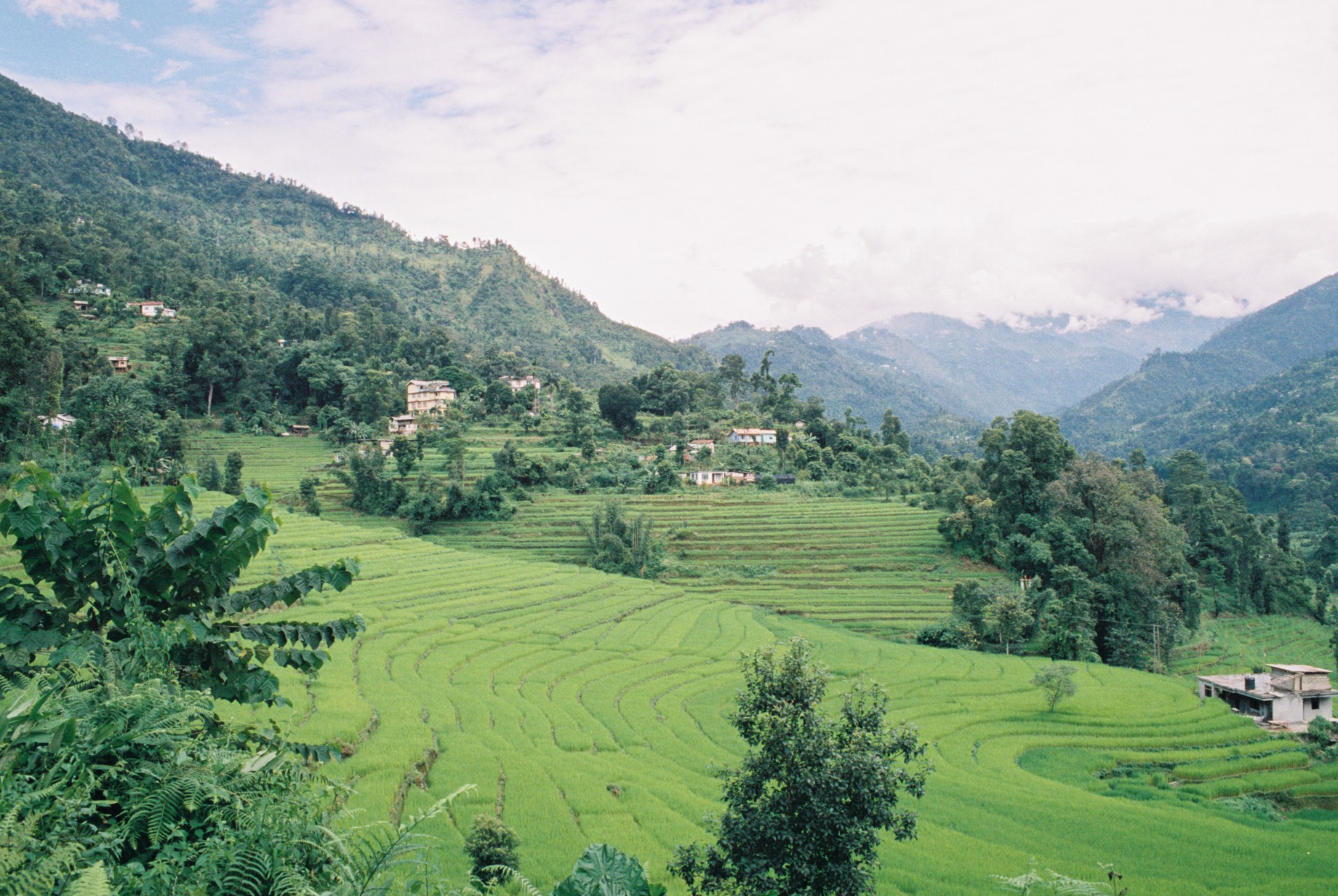
Terraced rice paddy fields of Sikkim.

== Transport ==
=== Air ===
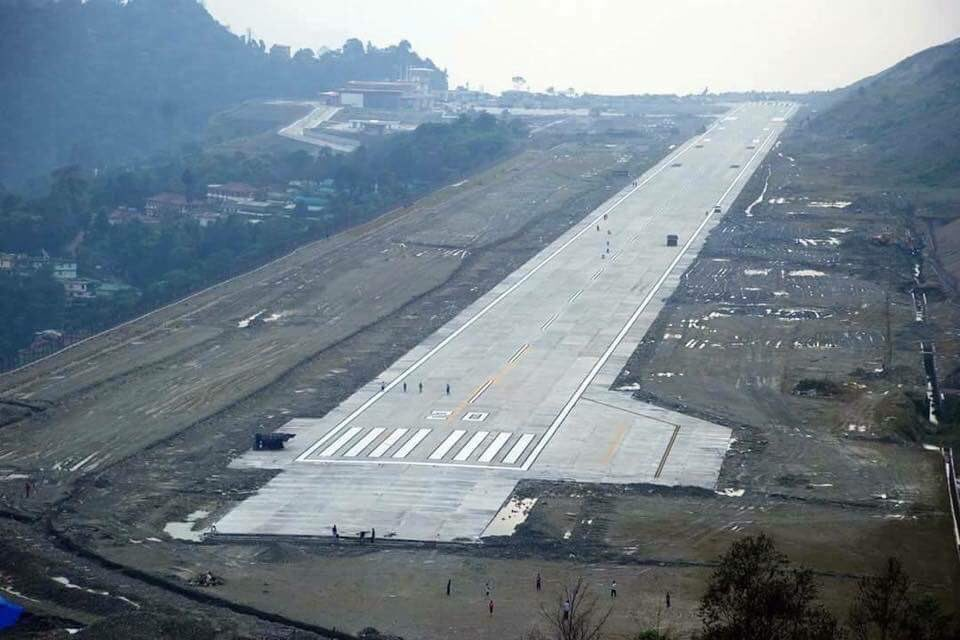
Runway at Pakyong Airport, is the first greenfield airport to be constructed in the Northeast India.

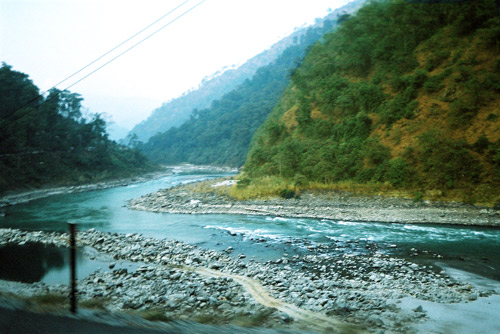
Teesta River is considered the state's key waterway.

Sikkim did not have any operational airport for a long time because of its rough terrain. However, in October 2018, Pakyong Airport, the state's first airport, located in Pakyong Town at a distance of 30 km (19 mi) from Gangtok, became operational after a four-year delay. It has been constructed by the Airports Authority of India on 200 acres of land. At an altitude of 4,700 feet (1,400 m) above sea level, it is one of the five highest airports in India. The airport is capable of operating ATR aircraft.

Before October 2018, the closest operational airport to Sikkim was Bagdogra Airport near Siliguri in northern West Bengal. The airport is located about 124 km (77 mi) from Gangtok, and frequent buses connect the two. A daily helicopter service run by the Sikkim Helicopter Service connects Gangtok to Bagdogra; the flight is thirty minutes long, operates only once a day, and can carry four people. The Gangtok helipad is the only civilian helipad in the state.

=== Roads ===
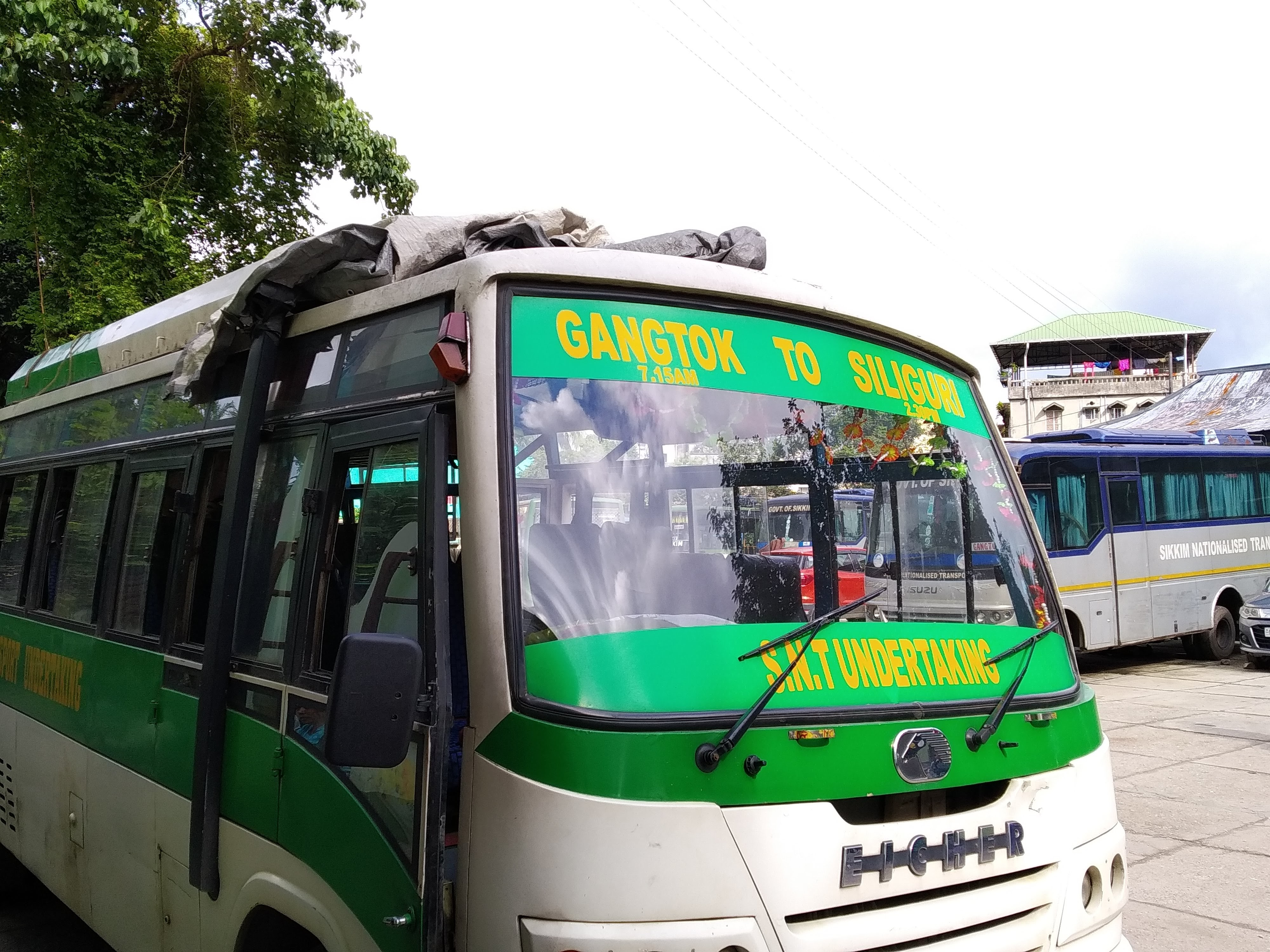
Gangtok to Siliguri Bus

National Highway 10 (NH 10; formerly NH 31A) links Siliguri to Gangtok. Sikkim Nationalised Transport runs bus and truck services. Privately run bus, tourist taxi, and jeep services operate throughout Sikkim and also connect it to Siliguri. A branch of the highway from Melli connects western Sikkim. Towns in eastern, southern, and western Sikkim are connected to the hill stations of Kalimpong and Darjeeling in northern West Bengal. The state is furthermore connected to Tibet by the mountain pass of Nathu La.

List of national highways of Sikkim:

Number	Length (km)	Length (mi)	Southern or western terminus	Northern or eastern terminus	Formed	Removed	Notes
NH 10	52	32	Gangtok – Singtam – Rangpo – West Bengal Border.		—	—	
NH 310	87	54	Ranipool (NH-31A) – Burtuk – Menla – Nathula		—	—	
NH 310A	55	34	Tashi viewpoint – Phodong – Mangan		—	—	
NH 510	70	43	Singtam – Damthang- Legship – Gyalshing		—	—	
NH 710	45	28	Melli- Manpur- Namchi- Damthang- Tarku		—	—	
NH 717A	112	70	West Bengal Border-Reshi- Rhenock, Rorathang Pakyong a-junction with new NH No. 10 at Ranipool near Gangtok		—	—	
NH 717B	42	26	Junction with NH No. 717A at Rhenock – Rongli, Rolep -junction with NH No. 310 near Menla at Serethang		—	—	

=== Rail ===
Sikkim lacks significant railway infrastructure. The closest major railway stations are Siliguri Junction and New Jalpaiguri in neighbouring West Bengal. However, the New Sikkim Railway Project has been launched to connect the town of Rangpo in Sikkim with Sevoke on the West Bengal border. This line is Sevoke-Rangpo Railway Line from Sivok railway station to Rangpo railway station. The five-station line is intended to support both economic development and Indian Army operations and was initially planned to be completed by 2015, though as of 2023, its construction has met with delays. In 2019, the railway line up to Rangpo was expected to be completed in 2021. In the second phase, the line will be extended up to Gangtok. In addition, the Ministry of Railways proposed plans in 2010 for railway lines linking Mirik in West Bengal to Namchi, Daramdin, Ranipool, and Gangtok.

== Infrastructure ==
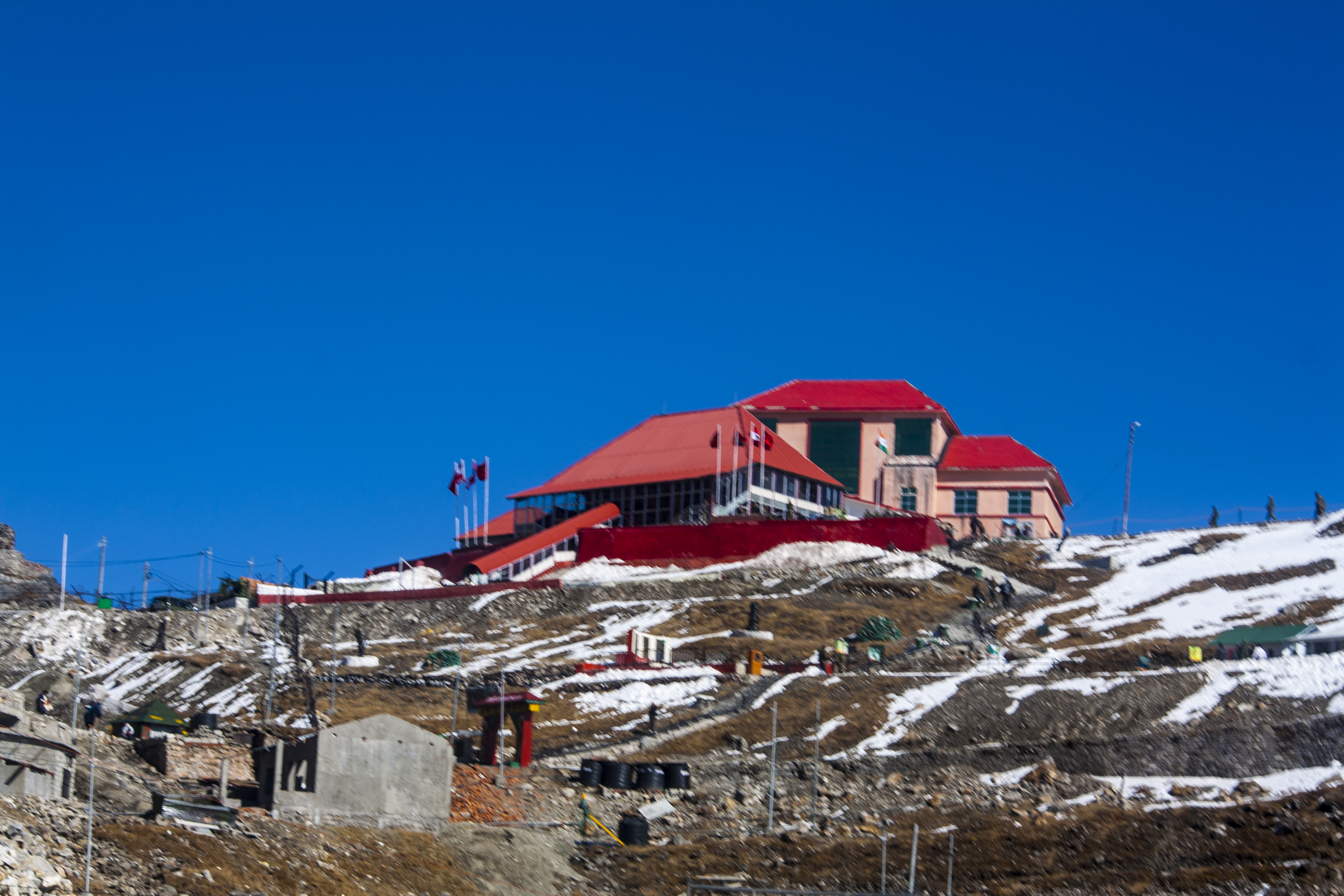
Nathu La Pass – Indo-China Border

Sikkim's roads are maintained by the Border Roads Organisation (BRO), an offshoot of the Indian Army. The roads in southern Sikkim are in relatively good condition, with landslides being less frequent in this region. The state government maintains 1,857 kilometres (1,154 mi) of roadways that do not fall under the BRO's jurisdiction.

Sikkim receives most of its electricity from 19 hydroelectric power stations. Power is also obtained from the National Thermal Power Corporation and Power Grid Corporation of India. By 2006, the state had achieved 100 percent rural electrification. However, the voltage remains unstable and voltage stabilisers are needed. Per capita consumption of electricity in Sikkim was approximately 182 kWh in 2006. The state government has promoted biogas and solar power for cooking, but these have received a poor response and are used mostly for lighting purposes. In 2005, 73.2 percent of Sikkim's households were reported to have access to safe drinking water, and the state's large number of mountain streams assures a sufficient water supply.

On 8 December 2008, it was announced that Sikkim had become the first state in India to achieve 100 percent sanitation coverage, becoming completely free of public defecation, thus attaining the status of "Nirmal State".

== Demographics ==
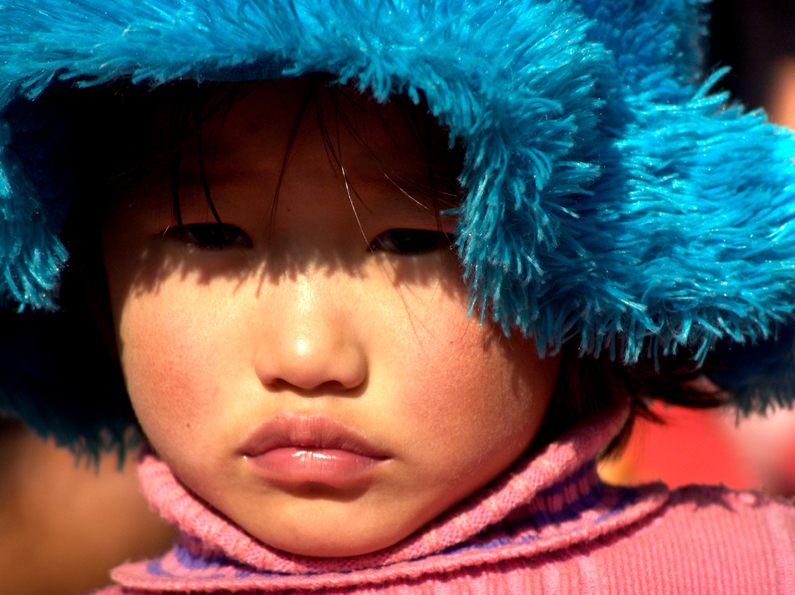
A little girl from Kaluk Bazaar

Historical population
Year	Pop.	±%
1901	59,014	—
1911	87,920	+49.0%
1921	81,721	−7.1%
1931	109,808	+34.4%
1941	121,520	+10.7%
1951	137,725	+13.3%
1961	162,189	+17.8%
1971	209,843	+29.4%
1981	316,385	+50.8%
1991	406,457	+28.5%
2001	540,851	+33.1%
2011	610,577	+12.9%
Source: Census of India

Sikkim is India's least populous state, with 610,577 inhabitants according to the 2011 census. Sikkim is also one of the least densely populated Indian states, with only 86 persons per square kilometre. However, it has a high population growth rate, averaging 12.36% per cent between 2001 and 2011. The sex ratio is 889 females per 1,000 males, with a total of 321,661 males and 286,027 females recorded in 2011. With around 98,000 inhabitants as of 2011, the capital Gangtok is the most significant urban area in the mostly rural state; in 2005, the urban population in Sikkim constituted around 11.06 percent of the total.

=== Languages ===
Languages of Sikkim (2011 census)
1. Nepali (62.6%)
2. Sikkimese (6.86%)
3. Limbu (6.34%)
4. Lepcha (6.27%)
5. Hindi (5.58%)
6. Sherpa (2.24%)
7. Tamang (1.92%)
8. Bhojpuri (1.63%)
9. Rai (1.22%)
10. Bengali (1.14%)
11. Other (4.20%)

The official languages of the state are Nepali, Sikkimese (Bhutia), Lepcha, Limbu, Newar, Rai, Gurung, Magar, Sherpa, Tamang, Sunwar (Mukhia) and Bhujel. Nepali and English are the primary working languages of the executive and legislature, whereas the others are used for the purpose of preservation of culture and tradition in the state.

Nepali is the lingua franca of Sikkim, while Sikkimese (Bhutia), Lepcha, Limbu, and others are spoken in certain areas of the state. English is also spoken and understood in most of Sikkim. Other languages include Dzongkha, Groma, Hindi, Majhi, Majhwar, Thulung, Tibetan, and Yakha.

=== Ethnicity ===
The majority of Sikkim's residents are Nepali Indians. The native Sikkimese include the Bhutias, who migrated from the Kham district of Tibet in the 14th century, and the Lepchas, who are believed to pre-date the Bhutias and are the oldest known inhabitants. Tibetans reside mostly in the northern and eastern reaches of the state. Migrant resident communities known as Plainsmen Sikkimese include Bengalis, Biharis, and Marwaris, who are prominent in commerce in South Sikkim and Gangtok, but only those who are the native residents since 1946.

=== Religion ===
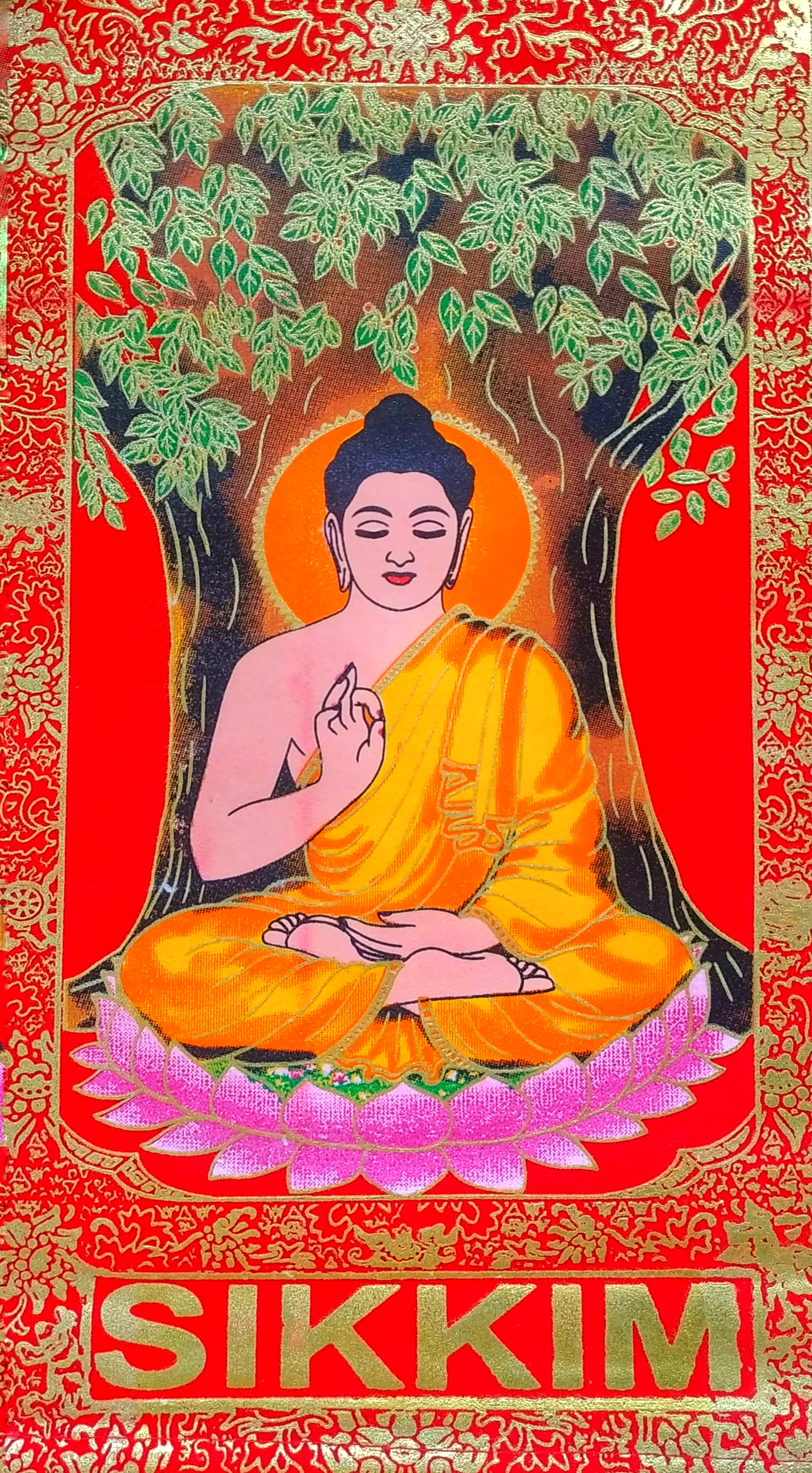
Buddha in Sikkim Culture

Religion in Sikkim (2011)
1. Hinduism (57.8%)
2. Buddhism (27.4%)
3. Christianity (9.91%)
4. Islam (1.62%)
5. Sikhism (0.31%)
6. Jainism (0.05%)
7. Other faith like Kirat Mundhum, Bon, Mun (2.67%)
8. No religion (0.30%)

Religious group	Population % 1991	Population % 2001	Population % 2011
Hinduism	68.36%	60.93%	57.76%
Buddhism	27.15%	28.11%	27.39%
Christianity	3.29%	6.67%	9.91%
Islam	0.94%	1.42%	1.62%
Sikhism	0.09%	0.21%	0.31%
Jainism	0.001%	0.03%	0.05%
Other religions	0.04%	2.38%	2.67%
No religion	–	–	0.3%

According to the 2011 census, 57.8% follow Hinduism, making it the state's majority religion. Buddhism is followed by 27.4% of the population, while Christianity is followed by 9.9%. Between 2001 and 2011, Christianity was the fastest growing religion in the state, going from 6.67% to 9.91% of the population. It was thus the fourth state with the highest Christian growth in the period, behind only Arunachal Pradesh, Manipur and Meghalaya. As of 2014, the Evangelical Presbyterian Church of Sikkim is the largest Christian denomination in Sikkim. Hinduism, on the other hand, declined from 60.93% to 57.76% of the population in the same period. Sikkim was the fourth state with the biggest decline in the percentage of Hindus, behind only Arunachal Pradesh, Manipur and Assam. Vajrayana Buddhism, which accounts for 27.3% of the population, is Sikkim's second-largest, yet most prominent religion. Prior to Sikkim's becoming a part of the Indian Union, Vajrayana Buddhism was the state religion under the Chogyal. Sikkim has 75 Buddhist monasteries, the oldest dating back to the 1700s. The public and visual aesthetics of Sikkim are executed in shades of Vajrayana Buddhism, and Buddhism plays a significant role in public life, even among Sikkim's majority Nepali Hindu population. Other religious minorities include Muslims of Tibet, Bihari ethnicity and Jains, who each account for roughly 1% of the population. The traditional religions of the native Sikkimese account for much of the remainder of the population.

Sikkim has 336 Hindu temples, 168 churches, 101 monasteries (Nyingmapa and Kagyupa), 7 mosques, and 2 gurdwaras.

Although tensions between the Lepchas and the Nepalese escalated during the merger of Sikkim with India in the 1970s, there has never been any major degree of communal religious violence, unlike in other Indian states. The traditional religion of the Lepcha people is Mun, an animist practice which coexists with Buddhism and Christianity.

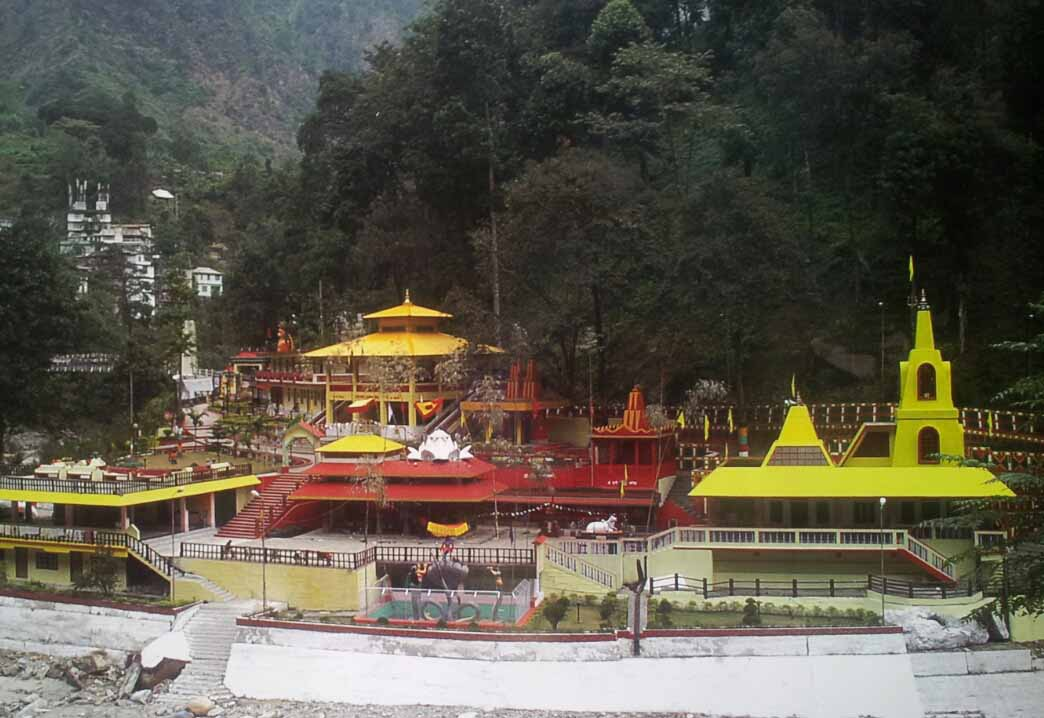
Kirateshwar Mahadev Temple in Legship is dedicated to the Hindu god Shiva.

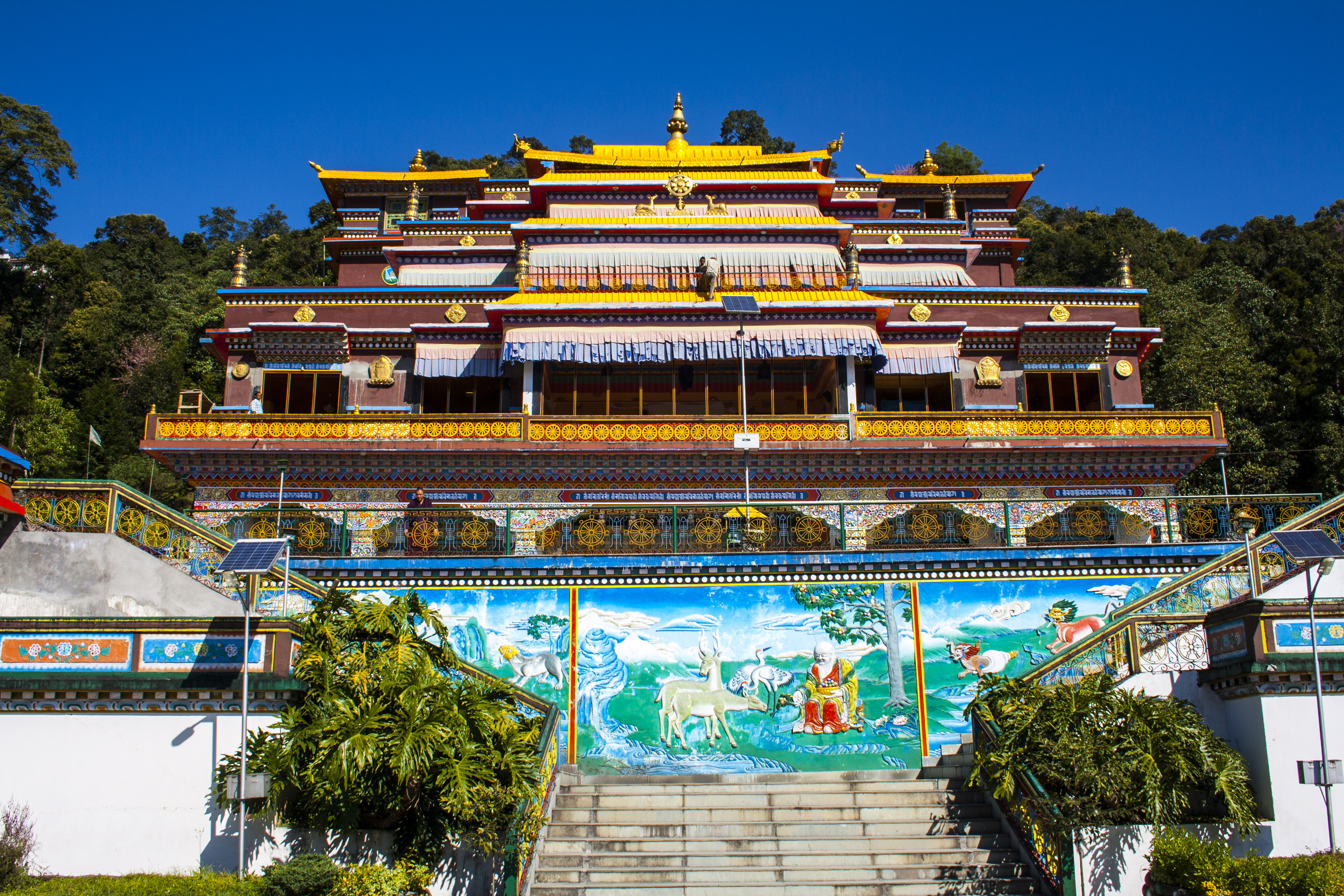
Rumtek Monastery

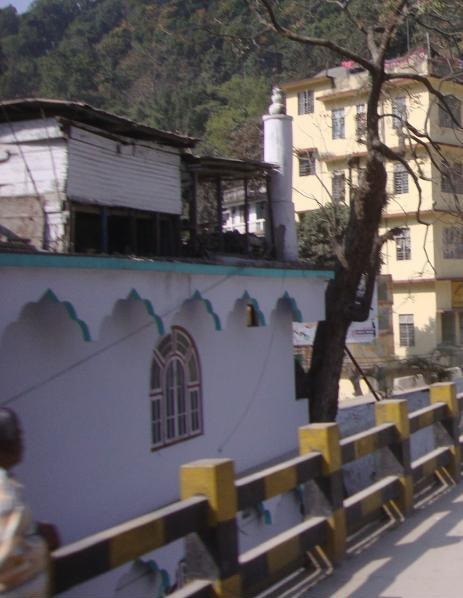
Singtam Mosque

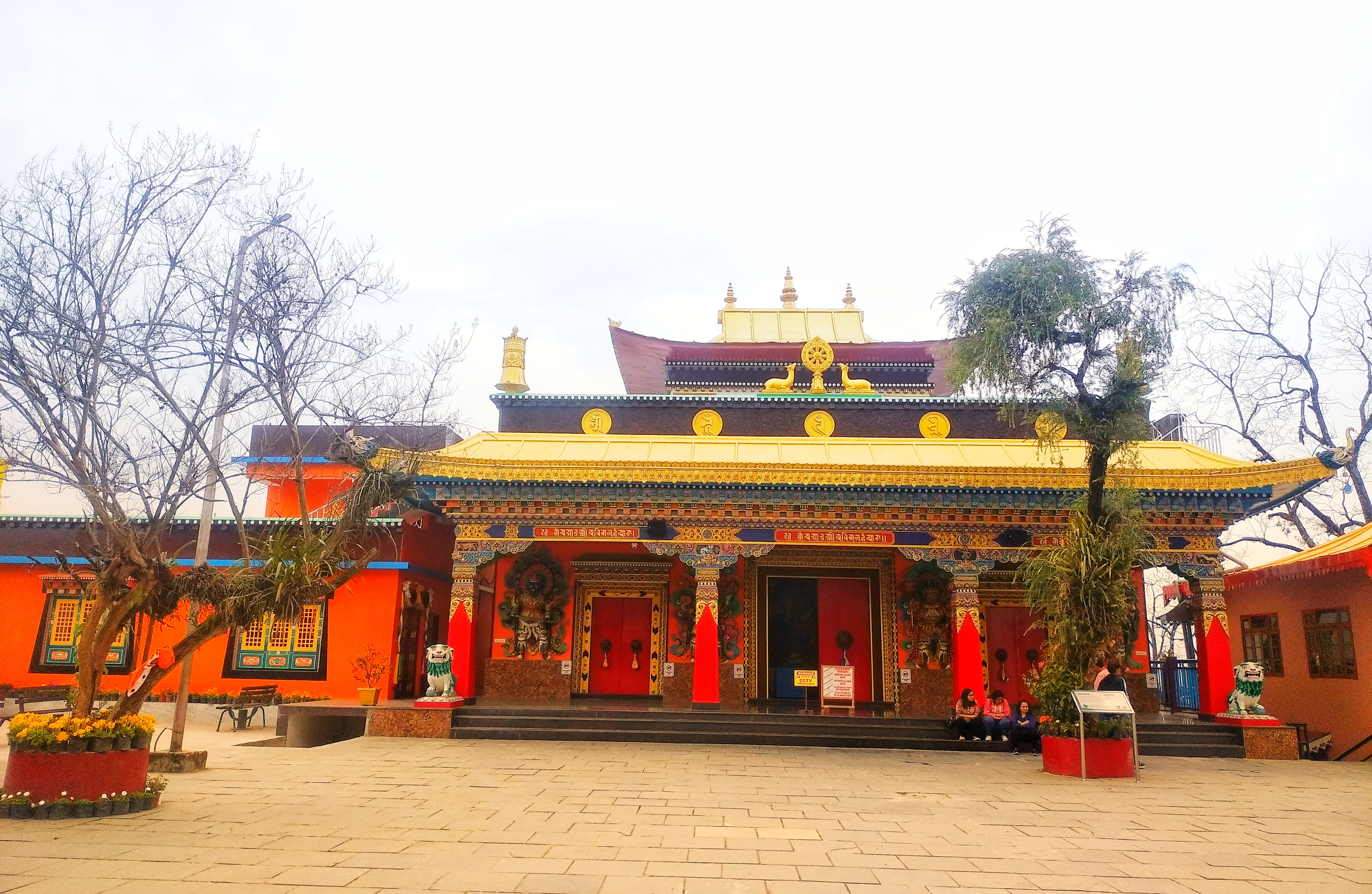
Enchey Monastery

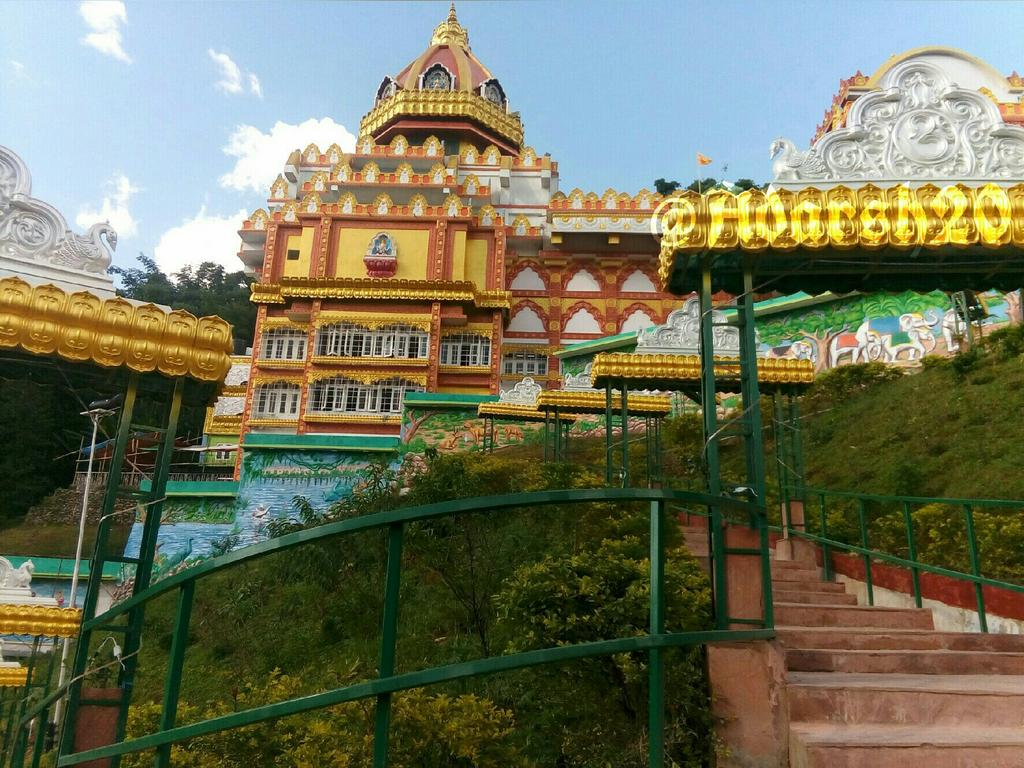
Vishwa Vinayak Temple at Rhenock

== Districts ==
There are 6 districts in Sikkim, each overseen by a Government appointee, the district collector, who is in charge of the administration of the civilian areas of the districts. The Indian Army has control of a large territory, as the state is a sensitive border area. Many areas are restricted, and permits are needed to visit them. The six districts are:

Code	District	Headquarters	Population (2011)	Area (km²)	Density (per km²)
GD	Gangtok district	Gangtok	281,293	954	257
MD	Mangan district	Mangan	43,354	4,226	10
ND	Namchi district	Namchi	146,742	750	175
GD	Gyalshing district	Geyzing	136,299	1,166	106
PD	Pakyong District	Pakyong	74,583	404	180
SD	Soreng District	Soreng	n/a	n/a	n/a

== Culture ==
=== Festivals and holidays ===
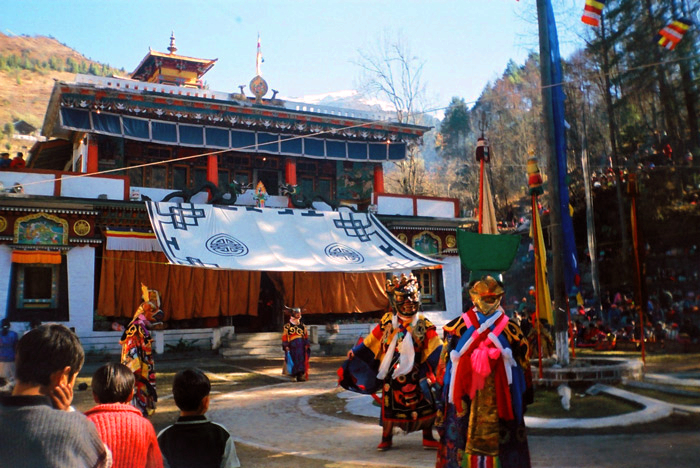
The traditional Gumpa dance being performed in Lachung during the Buddhist festival of Losar

Sikkim's Gorkhali majority celebrate all major Hindu festivals, including Tihar (Diwali) and Dashain (Dashera). Traditional local festivals, such as Maghe Sankranti, Ramnavmi, Janmastami, Holi, Shivaratri, Navratri, Sakela, Chasok Tangnam and Bhimsen Puja, are popular. Losar, Saga Dawa, Lhabab Duechen, Drupka Teshi and Bhumchu are among the Buddhist festivals celebrated in Sikkim. During the Losar (Tibetan New Year), most offices and educational institutions are closed for a week.

Sikkimese Muslims celebrate Eid ul-Fitr and Muharram. Christmas has been promoted in Gangtok to attract tourists during the off-season.

Western rock music and Indian pop have gained a wide following in Sikkim. Nepali rock and Lepcha music are also popular. Sikkim's most popular sports are football and cricket, although hang gliding and river rafting have grown popular as part of the tourism industry.

=== Cuisine ===
Traditional cuisines of the Lepcha, Limbu, Magar, and Bhutia peoples incorporate the rich biodiversity of the place. The Buddhist saint Padmasambhava, also known as Guru Rinpoche, who passed through ancient Sikkim in the eighth century, noted the rich produce of the place in his writings,

There are about 155 varieties of fruits with different tastes and nutritional values. [These include] a walnut that tastes like butter; a fruit known as wallay… and a grape with the taste of wine. There are fruits called tingding with the taste of meat, and sedey, which can be eaten as the equivalent of an entire meal; turnips, and thirty-seven other types of root vegetables are available. There are twenty different varieties of garlic. Altogether, among the edible plants, there are 360 varieties available. There are wild radishes, along with tsolay, nyolay, and grapes in the valley. In the trees, among the rocks, and hanging from the cliffs, there are beehives.

Noodle-based dishes such as thukpa, chow mein, thenthuk, fakthu, gyathuk and wonton are common in Sikkim. Momos – steamed dumplings filled with vegetables, chicken, mutton, beef, or pork and served with soup – are a popular snack.

Beer, whiskey, rum and brandy are widely consumed in Sikkim, as is tongba, a millet-based alcoholic beverage that is popular in Nepal and Darjeeling. Sikkim has the third-highest per capita alcoholism rate among all Indian states, behind Punjab and Haryana.

== Media ==
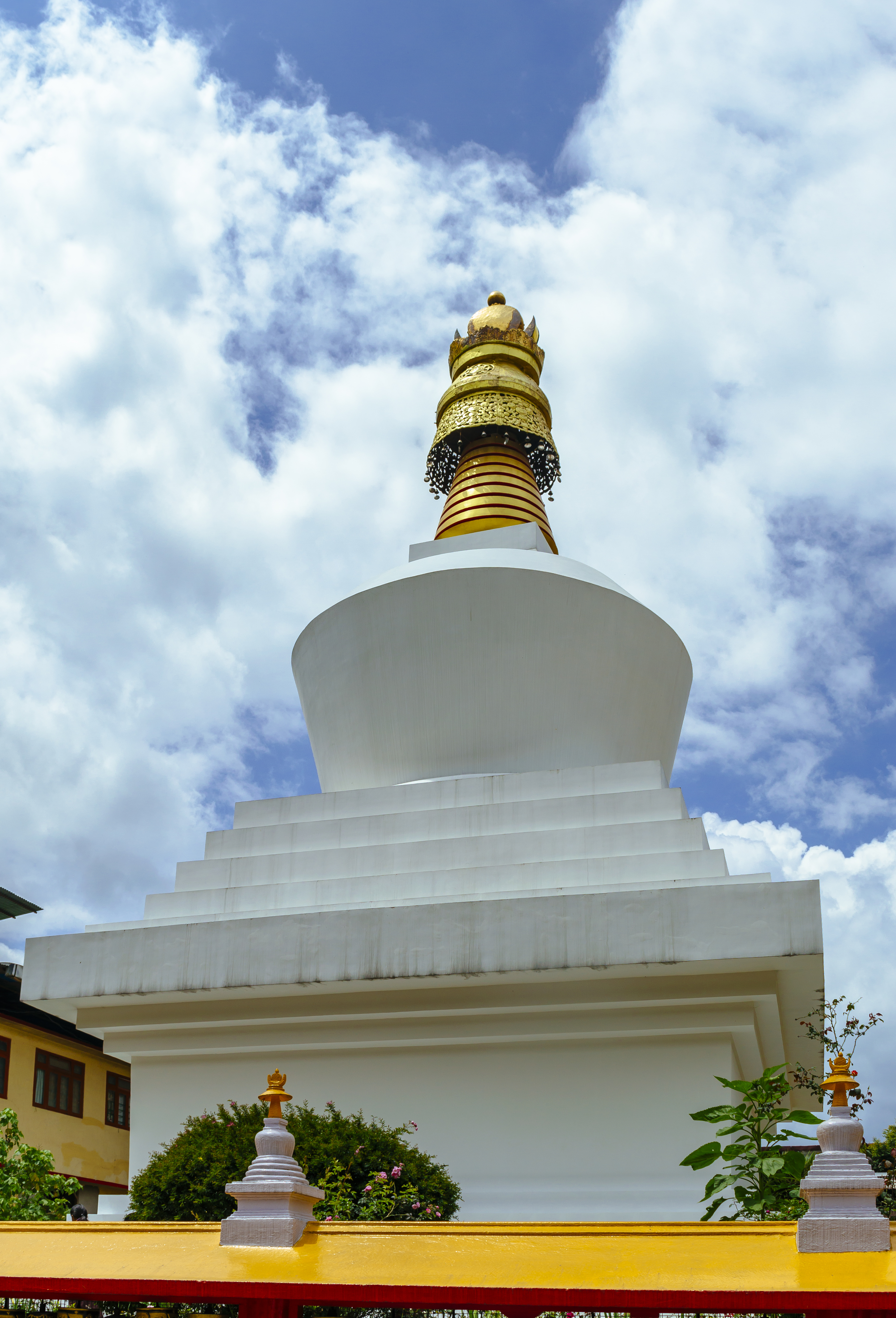
The Dro-dul Chorten Stupa in Gangtok.

In 1957, a Nepali monthly magazine Kanchenjunga became the first news outlet for the masses in Sikkim.

The southern urban areas of Sikkim have English, Nepali, and Hindi daily newspapers. Nepali-language newspapers, as well as some English newspapers, are locally printed, whereas Hindi and English newspapers are printed in Siliguri. Important local dailies and weeklies include Hamro Prajashakti (Nepali daily), Himalayan Mirror (English daily), the Samay Dainik, Sikkim Express (English), Kanchanjunga Times (Nepali weekly), Pragya Khabar (Nepali weekly) and Himali Bela. Furthermore, the state receives regional editions of national English newspapers such as The Statesman, The Telegraph, The Hindu and The Times of India. Himalaya Darpan, a Nepali daily published in Siliguri, is one of the leading Nepali daily newspapers in the region. The Sikkim Herald is an official weekly publication of the government. Online media covering Sikkim include the Nepali newspaper Himgiri, the English news portal Haalkhabar, and the literary magazine Tistarangit. Avyakta, Bilokan, the Journal of Hill Research, Khaber Khagaj, Panda, and the Sikkim Science Society Newsletter are among other registered publications.

Internet cafés are well established in the district capitals, but broadband connectivity is not widely available. Satellite television channels through dish antennae are available in most homes in the state. Channels served are largely the same as those available in the rest of India, although Nepali-language channels are also available. The main service providers include Airtel digital TV, Tata Sky, Dish TV, DD Free Dish and Nayuma.

== Education ==
In 2011, Sikkim's adult literacy rate was 82.2 per cent: 87.29 per cent for males and 76.43 per cent for females. There are a total of 1,157 schools in the state, including 765 schools run by the state government, seven central government schools and 385 private schools. There is one Institute of National Importance, one central university and four private universities in Sikkim offering higher education.

Recently, Government of Sikkim has approved the open school board named Board of Open Schooling and Skill Education, BOSSE to provide Secondary Education, Senior Secondary as well as Skill & Vocational Education up to pre-degree level and to provide opportunity to continue education to such students who have missed the opportunity of school education. Sikkim has a National Institute of Technology, currently operating from a temporary campus in Ravangla, South Sikkim, which is one among the ten newly sanctioned NITs by the Government of India under the 11th Five year Plan, 2009. The NIT Sikkim also has state of art super computing facility named PARAM Kanchenjunga which is said to be fastest among all 31 NITs. Sikkim University is the only central university in Sikkim. The public-private funded institution is the Sikkim Manipal University of Technological Sciences, which offers higher education in engineering, medicine, and management. It also runs a host of distance education programs in diverse fields.

Medhavi Skills University is a private university located in the state of Sikkim, India. It was established in 2021 under the Sikkim Private Universities (Amendment) Act, 2021. The university aims to provide skill-based education to students and bridge the gap between academia and industry.

There are two state-run polytechnic schools – the Advanced Technical Training Centre (ATTC) and the Centre for Computers and Communication Technology (CCCT) – which offer diploma courses in various branches of engineering. ATTC is situated at Bardang, Singtam, and CCCT at Chisopani, Namchi.

Sikkim University began operating in 2008 at Yangang, which is situated about 28 kilometres (17 mi) from Singtam. Many students, however, migrate to Siliguri, Kolkata, Bangalore and other Indian cities for their higher education.

The campus of the National Institute of Electronics & Information Technology (NIELIT), under the Ministry of Electronics & Information Technology of the Government of India, is at Pakyong in East Sikkim, and offers formal and informal education in the IT/ITES sector.

== Towns and cities ==
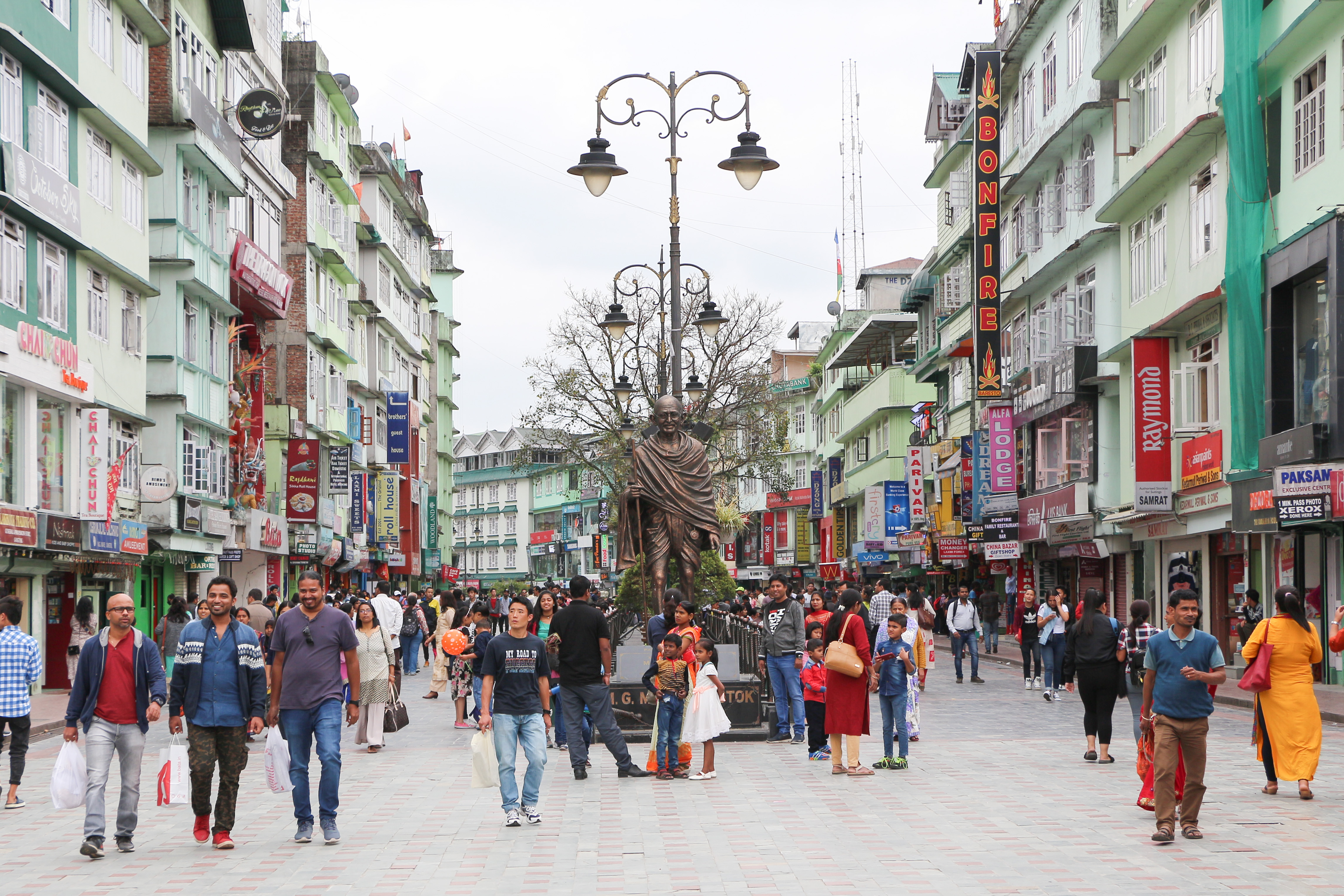
M. G. Marg in Gangtok.

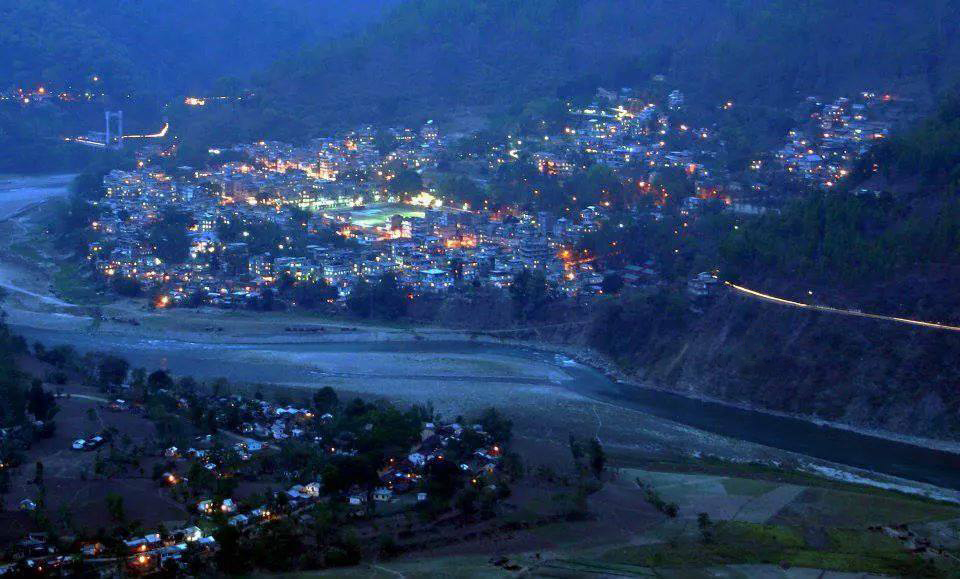
Jorethang at night time.

The major towns and cities of Sikkim are as follows:

Gangtok, Pakyong, Namchi, Jorethang, Rangpo, Singtam, Gyalshing, Mangan, Soreng, Pelling, Rhenock, Rongli, Rorathang, Ravangla, Chungthang, Ranipool, Lachen, Nayabazar, Lachung, Dikchu, Majitar, Legship, Melli, Yuksom, Sherathang, Namthang, Rinchenpong, Singhik, Hee Burmiok, Tashiding, Kumrek, Makha, Yangang, and Damthang.

== Sports ==
The popular sports played in Sikkim include football, cricket, archery, volleyball, tennis, badminton, and athletics. Adventure sports like paragliding, hiking, and mountain biking are also popular in Sikkim. The stadiums of Sikkim are as follows:

- Mining Cricket Stadium, Rangpo
- Paljor Stadium, Gangtok
- Bhaichung Stadium, Namchi
- Resithang Athletics Stadium, Gangtok.

== See also ==
- Outline of Sikkim
- Nepali Language Recognition Day

== Further reading and bibliography ==
- Bajpai, G. S. (1999), China's Shadow Over Sikkim: The Politics of Intimidation, Lancer Publishers, ISBN 978-1-897829-52-3
- Bareh, Hamlet (2001). "Introduction". Encyclopaedia of North-East India: Sikkim. Mittal Publications. ISBN 978-81-7099-794-8.
- Choudhury, Maitreyee (2006). Sikkim: Geographical Perspectives. New Delhi: Mittal Publications. ISBN 978-81-8324-158-8.
- Duff, Andrew (2015), Sikkim: Requiem for a Himalayan Kingdom, Birlinn, ISBN 978-0-85790-245-0
- Evans, W. H. (1932). The Identification of Indian Butterflies (2nd ed.). Mumbai, India: Bombay Natural History Society. ASIN B00086SOSG.
- Forbes, Andrew; Henley, David (2011). "The Tea Horse Road from Lhasa to Sikkim". China's Ancient Tea Horse Road. Chiang Mai: Cognoscenti Books. ASIN B005DQV7Q2.
- Gupta, Ranjan (September 1975), "Sikkim: The Merger with India", Asian Survey, 15 (9): 786–798, doi:10.2307/2643174, JSTOR 2643174
- Hooker, Joseph Dalton (1854). Himalayan Journals: notes of a naturalist in Bengal, the Sikkim and Nepal Himalayas, the Khasia mountains etc. Ward, Lock, Bowden & Co. ISBN 978-1-60620-983-7.
- Haribal, Meena (2003) [1994]. Butterflies of Sikkim Himalaya and their Natural History. Sikkim Nature Conservation Foundation. Natraj Publishers. ISBN 978-81-85019-11-6.
- Kandell, Alice S. (1971). Sikkim: The Hidden Kingdom (2nd ed.). Doubleday. ISBN 978-03-8502-206-4.
- Manorama Yearbook, 2003. Malayala Manorama Company. 2003. ISBN 81-900461-8-7.
- Ray, Arundhati; Das, Sujoy (2001). Sikkim: A Traveller's Guide. New Delhi: Orient Blackswan. ISBN 81-7824-008-4.
- Road & trekking maps of Darjeeling, Sikkim & Bhutan, Jaldapara Wildlife Sanctuary. New Delhi: Nest & Wings. 2003. ISBN 81-87592-07-9.
- Rose, Leo E. (1978), "Modernizing a Traditional Administrative System: Sikkim 1890–1973", in James F. Fisher (ed.), Himalayan Anthropology: The Indo-Tibetan Interface, Walter de Gruyter, pp. 205–, ISBN 978-90-279-7700-7
- Sinha, A. C., "Sikkim" (PDF), in Mayumi Murayama; Kyoko Inoue; Sanjoy Hazarika (eds.), Sub-Regional Relations in the Eastern South Asia: With Special Focus on India's North Eastern Region, Institute of Developing Economies
- Sikkim: Land of Mystic Splendour. Kathmandu: Himalayan Map House. ISBN 99933-603-9-2.
