= Nirmal Chandra Sinha =

Tibetologist

- Born: 1911; Ranchi, Jharkhand, India
- Died: August 3, 1997 (aged 85–86); Siliguri, West Bengal, India
- Occupations: Tibetologist, scholar
- Known for: Tibetology
- Awards: Padma Shri; Prema Dorjee award

Nirmal Chandra Sinha (1911–1997) was an Indian tibetologist, author, the founder director of Sikkim Research Institute of Tibetology (SIRT), presently known as the Namgyal Institute of Tibetology, Deorali near Gangtok. He was known for his contributions to Buddhism and the documentation of the history of Tibet and other states of Central Asia. He was honoured by the Government of India in 1971 with Padma Shri, the fourth highest Indian civilian award.

== Biography ==
Nirmal Chandra Sinha was born in 1911 in Ranchi in the Indian state of Jharkhand, formerly in Bihar. After securing a master's degree from the Presidency College, Calcutta, he joined as a member of faculty of Hooghly Mohsin College, in Chinsurah, West Bengal and later, as a professor of history at Behrampur College before joining the government service and was appointed as the cultural attache at the political office (residency) in 1955. Working as the attache, he toured Tibet in 1956 as a member of the Indian delegation that toured the country for inviting Dalai Lama. Thereafter, he worked at the Indian Archive where he had the opportunity to work under renowned educationist and former Union Minister of Education, Triguna Sen. In 1958, when the Sikkim Research Institute of Tibetology, present day Namgyal Institute of Tibetology (NIT), was established, Sinha was appointed as its founder director. He worked there till his retirement in 1987 after which he moved to Siliguri and took up the post as the Centenary Professor of International Relations at the University of Calcutta.

During his tenure as the director of NIT, Sinha contributed significantly to the Bulletin of Tibetology, a bi-annual publication by the institute. He was a scholar of many languages such as Tibetan, Sanskrit, Mongolian and Chinese which helped him in his writings. He wrote several articles in Sikkim Express and Gangtok Times and his last article, Lenin and Buddhism, written in July 1997 was published in the latter. He also published a book, Indian war economy, in 1962, co-written with P. N. Khera. A recipient of Prema Dorjee award from the Chogyal of Sikkim, he was awarded the civilian honour of Padma Shri by the Government of India in 1971. Sinha died on 3 August 1997 at Sunrise Nursing Home, Siliguri, at the age of 86. Namgyal Institute of Tibetology honoured him by compiling his selected works which was published as a book in 2008 under the name, A Tibetologist in Sikkim.

== Articles ==
List of articles published by Sinha in Bulletin of Tibetology.

1. Historical status of Tibet
2. Hacha for Lhasa
3. Tibet's status during the World War
4. On tantra
5. The missing context of Chos
6. Was the Simla Convention not signed?
7. The Himalayas
8. The Lama
9. The grey wolf
10. The refuge: India, Tibet and Mongolia
11. The sKyabs mgon
12. Chos srid gnyis-ldan
13. Sino-Indian inroads into North India
14. Obituary: Libing Athing
15. The Ancient path of the Buddhas
16. Brahmana and Kshatriya
17. Gilgit (and Swat)
18. The Simla Convention 1914: a Chinese puzzle
19. Obituary Yapshi Pheunkhang
20. Sanskrit across the Himalayas
21. India and Tibet
22. In memoriam
23. Budddhasasana in Tibet
24. Stupid barbarian / animal symbols in Buddhist art
25. Tibetan Studies in modern India
26. Peace and war in man's mind
27. Aspects of Buddhism
28. Publications through twenty years
29. The universal man
30. Articles of Tibet trade 1784
31. Publications through twenty-five years
32. Losar
33. About Dipankara Atisa
34. Geographical notices of India
35. On Tibetology
36. Ten priceless images
37. Relics of Asokan monks
38. Tradition and traditional sources
39. Dharma Tantra and Atisa
40. On names and titles
41. What constitute the importance of Atisa
42. Uttarukuru in Tibetan tradition
43. Inventory of Tibetan historical literature
44. Tantra in Mahayana texts
45. Stupa symbol
46. Inner Asia and India through the ages
47. A preface to Mahayana icononography
48. Tibetology contra Nepalese
49. Sahasra Buddha
50. Kalachakra Tantra
51. Buddharupa: observation on the evolution of Buddha image
52. Making of Dharmaraja
53. Dharamaraja Asoka
54. Asoka's dhamma: a testimony of monuments
55. Asoka's Dharma

== See also ==
- Namgyal Institute of Tibetology
