= Do-drul Chorten =

Stupa in Gangtok, Sikkim, India

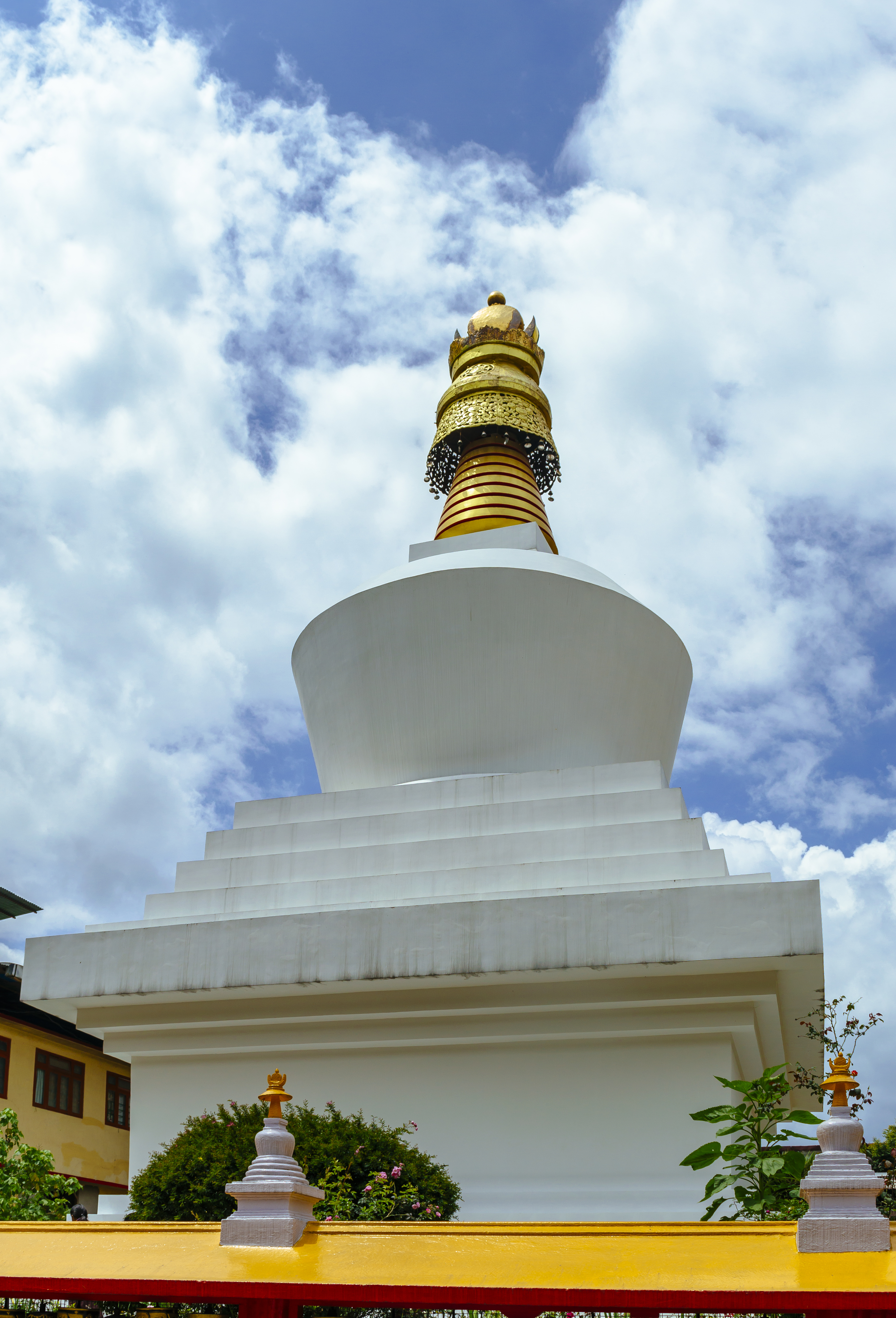

- Location within India

Religion
- Affiliation: Tibetan Buddhism
- Sect: Nyingma

Location
- Location: Sikkim, India
- Country: India
- Interactive map of Do-drul Chorten
- Coordinates: 27.3260°N 88.6108°E

Architecture
- Established: 1945-1946

Do-drul Chorten is a stupa in Gangtok in the Indian state of Sikkim. Inside this stupa is a complete set of Dorjee Phurba, Kangyur (Holy Books) and other religious objects. Around the stupa are 108 Mani Lhakor or prayer wheels. The stupa is surrounded by Chorten Lakhang and Guru Lakhang, where two statues of Guru Rinpoche are present. Next to the Chorten is a monastery for young Lamas with a shrine containing huge images of Padmasambhava and his manifestation, Guru Snang – Sid Zilzon. It is located about 500 meters above the Namgyal Institute of Tibetology.

== History ==
The Do-drul Chorten was once considered haunted, and the young Chogyal (king) of Sikkim invited Trulshik Rinpoche from Tibet to consecrate it and dispel negative influences. Construction began in 1945 and was completed the following year. Trulshik Rinpoche placed within the central chamber a complete Dorjee Phurba mandala set, volumes of the Kangyur (the canonical Tibetan Buddhist scriptures), long rolls of mantras (zung), and other ritual objects, ensuring the stupa’s efficacy as a powerful protective monument.

== Architecture ==
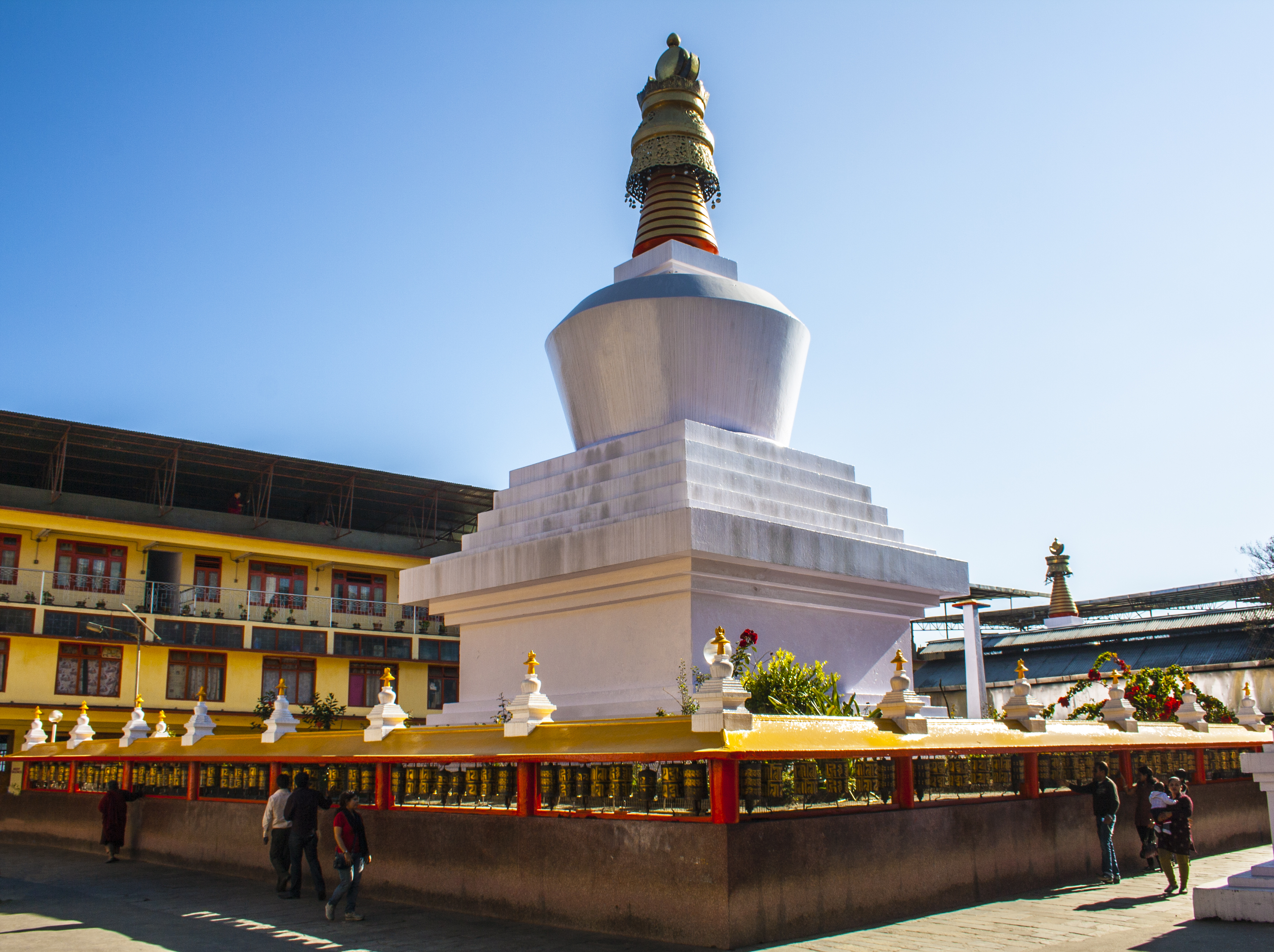
Dro-dul Chorten - Gangtok, Sikkim

Do‑drul Chorten follows the classic Tibetan stupa form, with a square base supporting a rounded dome surmounted by a golden spire of thirteen rings and a parasol finial. The main dome rises approximately 27 m above its base. Flanking the central stupa are four smaller satellite stupas at each cardinal point, each housing its own sacred relics. Built of brick and stucco, the exterior is topped by a gilded metal cap, while the base is painted white, symbolizing purity. A surrounding platform allows devotees to circumambulate the stupa.

There are 108 large prayer wheels (Mani Lhakor) on two concentric terraces around the stupa. Each of them are engraved with the mantra Om maṇi padme hūṃ in raised characters. Devotees spin these wheels in a clockwise direction while circumambulating, an act believed to accumulate merit and purify negativity. The number 108 carries special significance in both Buddhism and Hinduism, representing the cosmic number of delusions to be overcome.

There is a Dharma preaching center founded by Trulshik Rinpoche adjacent to this stupa. It accommodates approximately 700 monks engaged in study and ritual practice. The monastery buildings feature traditional Tibetan architectural motifs—sloping roofs, intricately painted cornices, and carved wooden windows. This monastic establishment continues to function as a center of learning for the Nyingma lineage.
