= Ranikhola =

Coordinates: 27.2601°N 88.5545°E

Rani Khola

Location
- Country: India
- State: Sikkim
- Town: Singtam, Ranipool

Physical characteristics
- Source: Himalayas
  - location: Himalayas, Sikkim, India
- Mouth: Teesta River
  - location: Singtam, Gangtok District, Sikkim, India

The Ranikhola is a river in Sikkim, India, that flows near the state capital Gangtok. It is a tributary of the Teesta River. The Mangar queen committed suicide on this river after the death of her husband at Mangarzong in 1642, so this river is named Ranikhola. The Ranikhola originates from the Himalayas and flows below Gangtok where it is joined by Ratey River and flows towards Ranipool where it is joined by another river called Roro River. The river then borders villages of Gangtok Subdivision in Gangtok District and Pakyong Subdivision of Pakyong District. National Highway 10 runs parallel to the Ranikhola from Ranipool to Singtam and ultimately flows into River Teesta at Singtam.

== Hydropower project ==
The first hydropower project commissioned in Sikkim was a micro-hydel on Ranikhola below Gangtok in 1927. It had an installed capacity of 50 kW.
