= Roro Chu =

River in India

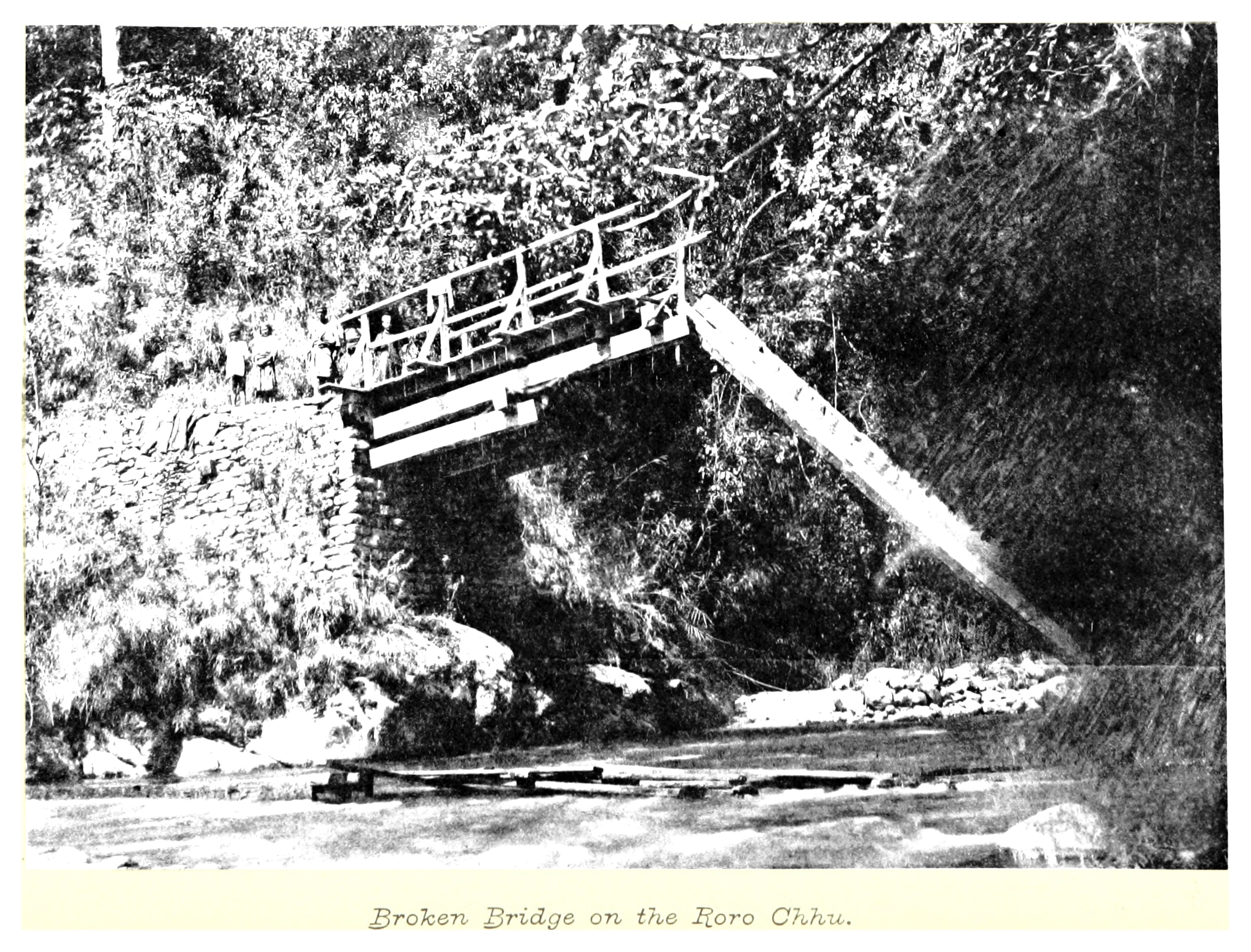
A damaged Roro-Chu-Bridge, 1894

The Roro Chu is a river in the Indian state of Sikkim that flows near Gangtok. It flows into the river Ranikhola at Ranipool. The combined river, known as Ranikhola, flows into the Teesta at Singtam.
