= Teshi =

Teshi may refer to:

- Drupka Teshi, Buddhist festival
- Teshie, city on the coast of Ghana east of Accra
