= Thakurbari Temple, Gangtok =

Hindu temple in Sikkim, India

Thakurbari Temple
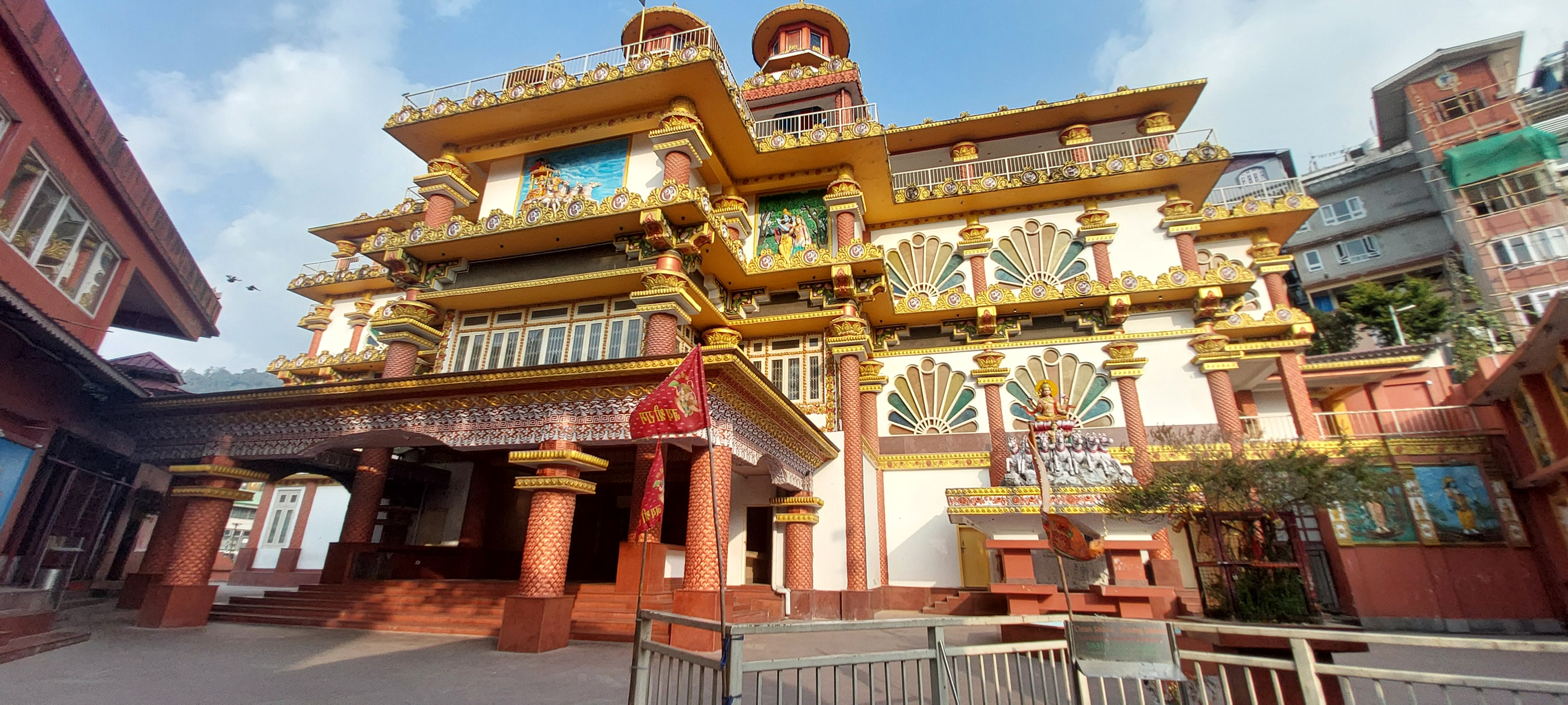
- Thakurbari Temple

- Location in Sikkim

Religion
- Affiliation: Hinduism
- District: Gangtok
- Deity: Shiva
- Festivals: Bala Chaturdasi and Maha Shivaratri

Location
- Location: Gangtok
- State: Sikkim
- Country: India
- Interactive map of Thakurbari Temple
- Coordinates: 27.3301°N 88.6132°E

Thakurbari Temple (Nepali: ठाकुरबारी मन्दिर) is a Hindu temple located in Gangtok, Sikkim, India, in the heart of the town. It is one of the oldest Hindu temples in Sikkim built on land donated by the erstwhile Chogyal of Sikkim in 1935. The temple houses almost all major deities and has emerged as an important center of convergence for the Hindu community of Gangtok.

== Upgrades ==
Subsequently, the temple was upgraded to a major temple-complex in the time period between 1945 and 1947.

In 2011, the temple complex was further upgraded to include a multipurpose hall and library. Completion was expected by 2012.

As of 15 February 2015 the temple was incomplete due to shortage of funds. Another Rs. 3 crore is required to complete the mandir.
