= Urban Development and Housing Department (Sikkim) =

Urban Development and Housing Department is a department of Government of Sikkim. This looks after the management of urban areas of the Indian state of Sikkim, including several civic utilities of the capital, Gangtok.
