= Sikkim Judicial Academy =

Judicial training wing of Sikkim, India

Coordinates: 27.323°N 88.606°E

Sikkim Judicial Academy was inaugurated at Sokeythang, Gangtok on June 28, 2018. A Supreme Court Judge Mr. Altamas Kabir, laid the foundation stone of the academy on 15 May 2012.

The academy was to be the second in the North East Region after the first one in Guwahati. The new complex will cater to the academic, administrative and residential needs of the Judicial Academy in imparting training and judicial education to newly inducted civil judges, judicial magistrates and district judges as well as in arranging continuous judicial education programmes for in-service judicial officers and prosecutors. It will also conduct training courses for new prosecutors.
