= Singtam =

- Town
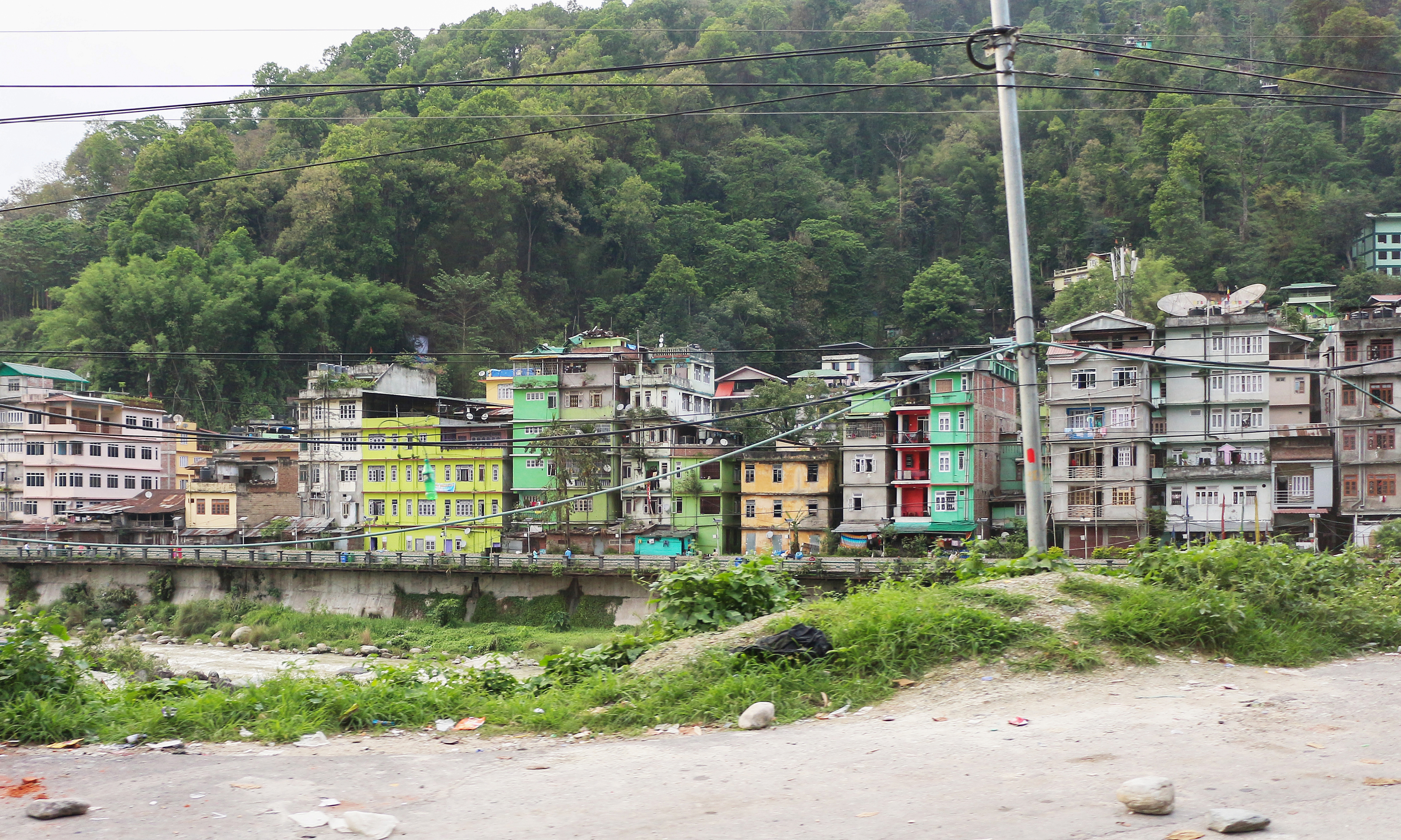
- View of Singtam

- Location in Sikkim, India Singtam (India)
- Coordinates: 27.2331°N 88.4961°E
- Country: India
- State: Sikkim
- District: Gangtok; Pakyong

Government
  - Type: Nagar Panchayat
  - Body: Singtam Municipal Council
- Elevation: 426 m (1,396 ft)

Population (2011)
  - Total: 5,868

Languages
  - Official: Nepali, Bhutia, Lepcha, Limbu, Newari, Rai, Gurung, Magar, Sherpa, Tamang and Sunwar
- Time zone: UTC+5:30 (IST)
- PIN: 737 134
- Telephone code: 03592
- Vehicle registration: SK 08
- Literacy: 86.08%
- Lok Sabha: Sikkim Constituency
- Vidhan Sabha: Khamdong-Singtam Constituency
- Website: eastsikkim.nic.in

Singtam is a town which lies mostly in Gangtok District and partly in Pakyong District in the Indian state of Sikkim about 30 kilometres (19 mi) from the state capital Gangtok. The town lies on the banking of the rivers Teesta and Ranikhola, which join together just below the town. NH10 and NH510 meet in Singtam. The Indreni Bridge and Sherwani Bridge over the river Teesta are in the town. Singtam District Hospital, the district hospital of Pakyong District, lies at Golitar, Singtam.

== Geography ==
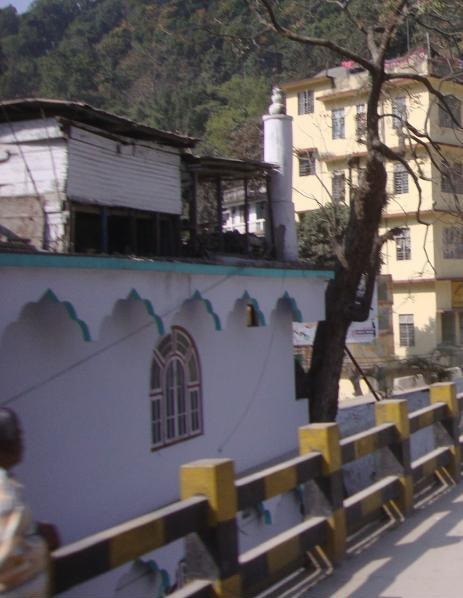
Singtam Mosque

Singtam is located at 27.15°N 88.38°E. It has an average elevation of 1396 feet. As the town lies on the bank of two rivers River Teesta and Ranikhola, during Monsoon especially from June to September the volume of both the rivers increases heavily, as a result destruction is caused in the low-lying areas of the town especially at Adarsh gaon and Jublee line part of the town.

== Demographics ==
As of 2001 India census, Singtam had a population of 5,868. Males constitute 56% of the population and females 44%. Singtam has an average literacy rate of 71%, higher than the national average of 59.5%: male literacy is 75%, and female literacy is 66%. In Singtam, 12% of the population is under 6 years of age.

=== Religion ===
Religious Demographic in Singtam Nagar Panchayat (2011)
1. Hinduism (77.9%)
2. Islam (8.54%)
3. Buddhism (8.11%)
4. Christianity (5.28%)
5. Others (0.17%)

=== Languages ===
Languages spoken in Singtam Nagar Panchayat (2011)
1. Nepali (39.2%)
2. Hindi (34.0%)
3. Bhojpuri (18.3%)
4. Urdu (2.84%)
5. Bengali (1.22%)
6. Bhutia (0.97%)
7. Marwari (0.85%)
8. Others (2.64%)

== Transportation ==
Air

The nearest airport to Singtam is 33 kilometres (21 mi) at Pakyong Airport in Sikkim from where flights operate to and from Delhi, Guwahati and Kolkata and 92 kilometres (57 mi) away at Bagdogra in West Bengal, where scheduled flights operate to and from Kolkata, Delhi, Bangalore, Chennai, Jaipur, Hyderabad, Mumbai, Patna, Ahmedabad, Dibrugarh, and Guwahati. Druk Airways from Bagdogra operate to and from Bangkok and Paro. Bagdogra airport is connected to Gangtok by a helicopter service operating between Gangtok-Bagdogra-Gangtok.

Rail

The two nearest railway stations in traffic in April 2023 are at Siliguri Junction 81 kilometres (50 mi) away and New Jalpaiguri 86 kilometres (53 mi) away. They provide links to all important cities in India.

The new under construction Sivok–Rangpo line will end at the Rangpo railway station, which is 10 kilometres away from Singtam. If the planned prolongation to Gangtok is built, then Singtam should also get a railway station.

Road

National highway NH10 (Formerly NH-31A) passes through Singtam and connects to the town to the rest of the nation. Long-distance buses ply from major towns in Bihar, West Bengal and other neighbouring states to Siliguri. From Siliguri, it takes about 3 hours to reach Singtam. Private taxis, shared taxi jeeps ply regularly on NH10. Government buses (SNT) and Privately operated buses are also available throughout the day. These transport options mostly operate between Siliguri-Gangtok/Singtam route. Jeep services are available between Gangtok/Singtam-New Jalpaiguri (NJP) and Gangtok/Singtam-Bagdogra route.

In Singtam NH-10 is joined by the following major roads:

- Chungthang-Mangan-Dikchu-Singtam Road
- Gyalshing-Legship-Tarku-Singtam Road(NH-510)
- Namchi-Damthang-Temi-Singtam Road
- Ravangla-Yangyang-Mangley-Singtam Road

Daily Taxi services access almost all cities and towns of Sikkim and cities/towns of West Bengal like Siliguri, Kalimpong, Darjeeling, Kurseong, Jaigaon, Malbazar, Bagdogra, Panitanki etc.

Frequent buses operated by Sikkim Nationalised Transport (SNT) are available from Singtam to Sikkim Nationalised Transport Bus Terminus (Siliguri) and Gangtok, apart from it many private buses and NBSTC buses are available from the town to Gangtok, NJP Bus Stand and Tenzing Norgay Bus Terminus, (Siliguri).

Note: foreigners need a permit to enter Sikkim which they can easily get at Siliguri or at Rangpo, Sikkim.

== Economy ==
Singtam is one of largest market towns in Sikkim and is easily accessible from almost all the cities and towns of Sikkim.

The trade of Black cardamom, broom plant (kuccho) and ginger are important economic activities of Singtam.

== 2023 Sikkim Flash Floods ==
2023 Sikkim Flash Floods

== See also ==
- Pakyong Airport
- Rangpo railway station
- River Teesta
