= Ratey Chu =

River in India

The Ratey Chu is a river in the Indian state of Sikkim that is the main source of water for the state capital, Gangtok. The Ratey Chu emerges from the glacier-fed Tamze lake at an elevation of 3,800 metres (12,500 ft) above sea level. The Ratey Chu is tapped for drinking water at an elevation of 2,500 metres (8,200 ft). From this tapping point or water supply head work, water is transported 17 kilometres (11 mi) to the Selep Water Treatment Plant site.
