= Drupka Teshi =

Buddhist festival

- Observed by: Tibet and Bhutan
- Type: Buddhist
- Date: 22nd day of the ninth lunar month

Drug-pa Tse-zhi is a Buddhist festival celebrated to observe Buddha's first preaching of the Four Noble Truths at the deer park in Sarnath. It falls on the fourth day of the sixth month in the Tibetan calendar, around August or July.
