= Namgyal Institute of Tibetology =

Tibet museum in Gangtok, Sikkim, India

Coordinates: 27.3159°N 88.6047°E

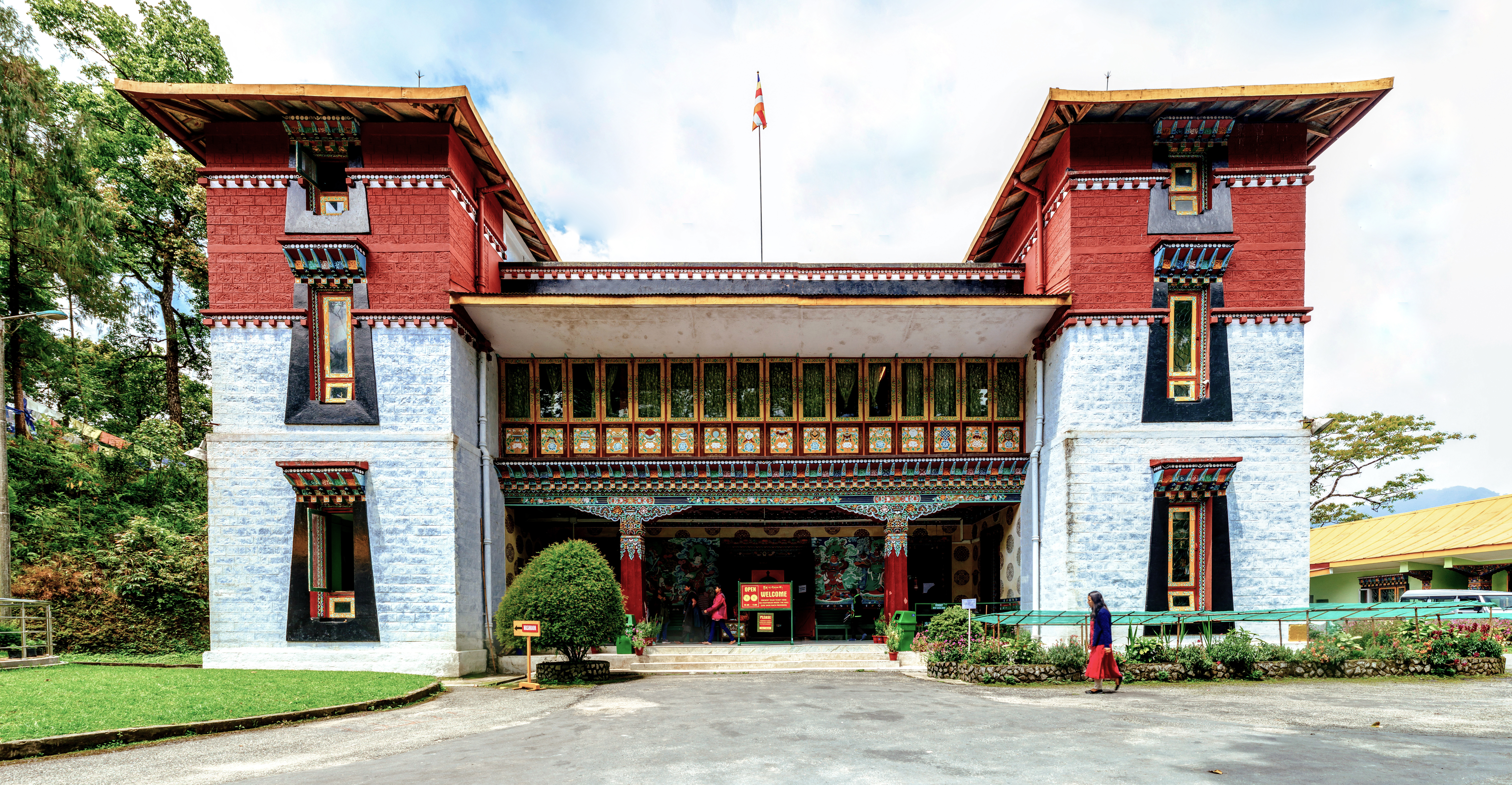
- Entrance of the Institute building
- Established: October 1, 1958; 67 years ago
- Location: Gangtok, Sikkim, India
- Academic Affiliation: Sikkim University
- Director: Passang D. Phempu
- Website: tibetology.net

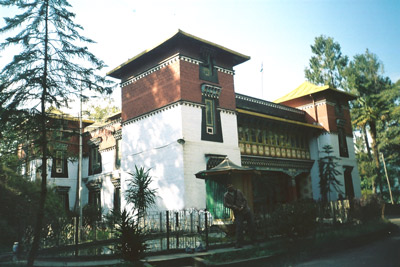

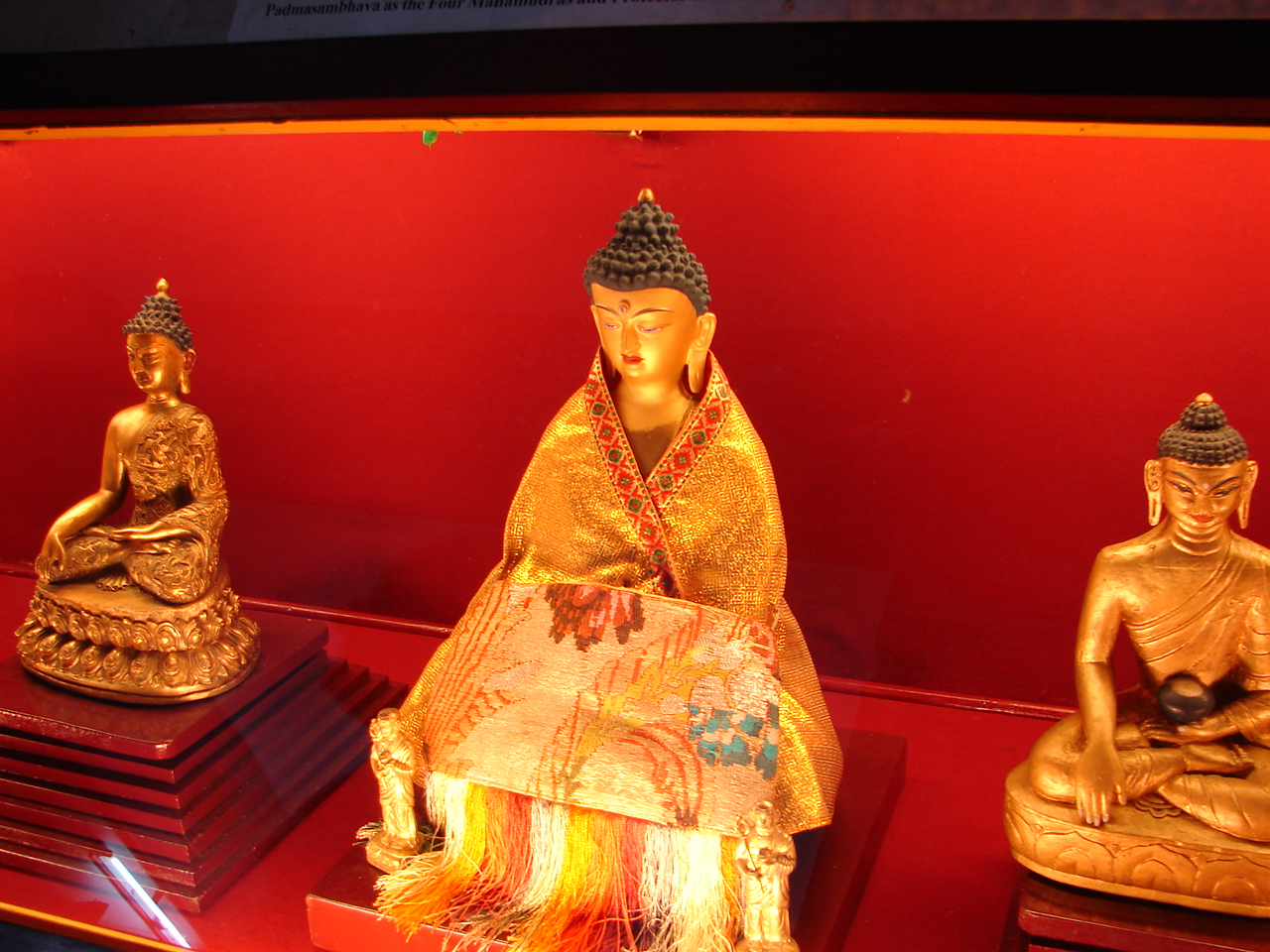

Namgyal Institute of Tibetology (NIT) is a Tibet museum in Gangtok, Sikkim, India, named after the 11th Chogyal of Sikkim, Sir Tashi Namgyal. The institute employs researchers and one of its new research programs is a project which seeks to document the social history of Sikkim's approximated 60 monasteries and record this on a computer. Another project seeks to digitize and document old and rare photographs of Sikkim for knowledge distribution. Khempo Dhazar served as head of the Sheda, a Nyingma college attached to the Institute, for six years.

== History ==
The foundation stone of the museum was laid by the 14th Dalai Lama on 10 February 1957. On 1 October 1958, Pandit Jawaharlal Nehru, the then Prime Minister of India, inaugurated the Sikkim Research Institute of Tibetology. Sir Tashi Namgyal, the then Maharaja of Sikkim, changed its name into the "Namgyal Research Institute of Tibetology".

== Academic journals ==
The Bulletin of Tibetology is an academic journal published by the Namgyal Institute of Tibetology.
