= Naxal railway station =

Railway station in West Bengal, India

Naxal Railway Station

General information
- Location: Kunia Jhalong Road, Rongo District: Kalimpong State: West Bengal; India
- Coordinates: 27.01°N 88.87°E
- Elevation: 178 metres (584 ft)
- System: Indian Railways Station
- Owner: Indian Railways
- Operator: Northeast Frontier Railway zone
- Line: Matelli Naxal line (under construction)
- Platforms: 1
- Tracks: 2 (undergoing construction)

Construction
- Structure type: At grade
- Parking: Available (after completion of construction)

Other information
- Status: Under construction
- Station code: NAXAL
- Zone(s): Northeast Frontier Railway zone
- Division(s): Alipurduar
Location
- Location within West Bengal Location within India

Naxal Railway Station station code NAXAL is an under construction railway station that serves the town of Jaldhaka, Rongo, Jhalong and nearby areas like Bindu, Todey Tangta, Suntalekhola etc in Kalimpong district of the Indian state of West Bengal. The station lies under Northeast Frontier Railway's, Alipurduar railway division. This railway station lies on Matelli - Naxal railway line which is currently under construction. The currently functioning nearest railway station is Chalsa railway station 26 kilometres away.
