= Todey Tangta =

- Village
- Location within West Bengal Location within India
- Coordinates: 27°06′35″N 88°49′30″E
- Country: India
- State: West Bengal
- District: Kalimpong
- Elevation: 1,312.896 m (4,307.40 ft)

Population (2011)
  - Total: 5,290

Languages
  - Regional: Nepali, Bhutia, Lepcha, Kiranti, Bantawa
  - Official: English, Nepali, Hindi, Bengali
- Time zone: UTC+5:30 (IST)
- PIN: 734 503
- Telephone code: 03552
- Vehicle registration: WB-78, 79

Todey and Tangta are two small villages in the Gorubathan CD block in the Kalimpong Sadar subdivision of the Kalimpong district in West Bengal, India.

== Geography ==
Places in the Kalimpong Sadar subdivision in Kalimpong district
CT: census town, R: rural/ urban centre, M: municipality, F: facility, NP: national park
Abbreviations used in names – TG for Tea Garden (town/village)
Owing to space constraints in the small map, the actual locations in a larger map may vary slightly

=== Location ===
Todey Tangta is located at 27°06′35″N 88°49′30″E.

=== Area overview ===
The map alongside shows the Kalimpong Sadar subdivision of Kalimpong district. Physiographically, this area forms the Kalimpong Range, with the average elevation varying from 300 to 3,000 metres (980 to 9,840 ft). This region is characterized by abruptly rising hills and numerous small streams. It is a predominantly rural area with 77.67% of the population living in rural areas and only 22.23% living in the urban areas. While Kalimpong is the only municipality, Dungra is the sole census town in the entire area. The economy is agro-based and there are 6 tea gardens in the Gorubathan CD block. In 2011, Kalimpong subdivision had a literacy rate of 81.85%, comparable with the highest levels of literacy in the districts of the state. While the first degree college in the subdivision was established at Kalimpong in 1962 the entire subdivision (and now the entire district), other than the head-quarters, had to wait till as late as 2015 (more than half a century) to have their first degree colleges at Pedong and Gorubathan. Todey Tangta is a Kashmahal wherein lots of surrounding villages depend on the main market known as Todey Bazaar. Village Tangta is around 3.8 km away from Todey Bazaar itself which is extremely close to Kingdom Of Bhutan. River Tangta, locally known as Simana River flows by the village acting as the sole border between the two nations. River Tangta not only forms a border, but it is also the main river that is joined by many other rivers, streams and tributaries on its way and later on goes to form River Jaldhaka, which supplies electricity to various parts of our nation.

Note: The map alongside presents some of the notable locations in the subdivision. All places marked in the map are linked in the larger full screen map.

=== Climate ===
Though hilly regions are assumed to be the source of fresh water, the sources in many parts of these regions have dried up along the years, but yet, Todey Tangta has many active sources. With an altitude of 1365 meters to be precise, Todey Tangta has a variable and unique weather conditions of its own. Some may find it harsh as the rainy season clings to the place from the month of May till the end of September. During the rainy season, most of the time the place is covered with natural blanket i.e dense mist and fog. The days are mostly swept by rainfall, which could sometimes be continuous for days and eventually lead to become the major factor for landslides everywhere. Early mornings could be welcomed by beautiful sunshine in the horizon, but the daytime and the evenings can never be determined to what could happen next. The majority of the population depends on cardamom plantation, which is specifically done in the rainy season. The autumn is anonymously short lived in this place as the winter trolls it by the end of November. Contrast to the rainy season, the winter too is typically awkward. During the month of November and December, when the winter is picking up its chilling atmosphere, the harvesting of cardamom is taken place in most of the villages whereas villages with warmer climate does the production in the month of August- September. The winter lengthens till the end of March with clear skies, visible sunshine and spectacular sight of the unending hills. Slight showers during winters are common. The nearby mountain region is mostly covered with snow during the time and few villages even get snowfall during harsh winters. This (Nov - March) time of the year is the best to be at places as such.

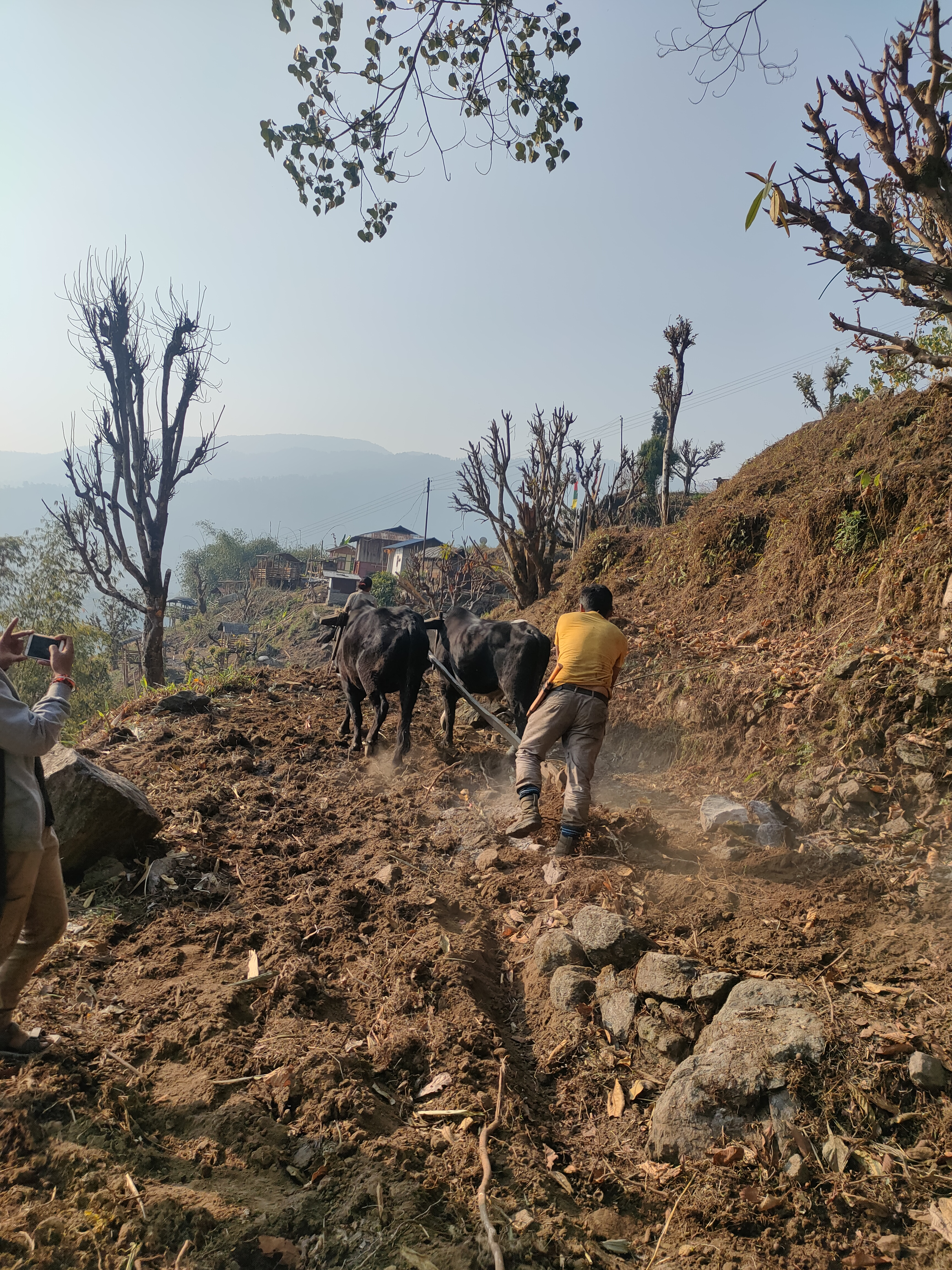
A man ploughing with bulls in a terraced field of Tangta village.

== Demographics ==
According to the 2011 Census of India, Todey Tangta Khasmahal had a total population of 5,290 of which 2,721 (51%) were males and 2,569 (49%) were females. There were 624 persons in the age range of 0 to 6 years. The total number of literate people in Todey Tangta Khasmahal was 3,445 (73.83% of the population over 6 years).

== Economy ==
The area is famous for Black cardamom production. The production of cardamom was passed on from generations, but the golden period was considered to be short lived (1995-2005).Since it was the only source of income in the region for 96% of the population, the farming had to be continued even in harsh terms and conditions. Previously known for its easy cultivation and one of the most expensive cash crops, Todey Tangta is still known for it. The production of cardamom flourished to other parts of Darjeeling and even eastern Nepal from here. Lately, Tourism infrastructure is paving its way into the mindsets of the individuals and keen ones are steadily taking initiatives for its growth and welfare. As of now, there are limited tourist accommodations available. Cardamom Homestay (Pala), Hangleena Hotel (Todey), The Wildwoods Retreat (Chisang), Chumang River Nest (Donathong), Lodenla Homestay (Pumsi) and Chum Mhen Tshu Farmstay (Keram Taar) are few homestays which are growing up very fine. There are monasteries(natively known as Gumba) at Upper Tangta Village both the Tamang's and Bhutia's. The area is also known for medicinal plants. People used to use horses as a medium of transportation since the early 60's due to non availability of motor roads and to this day we can still see few people using this mode of transport due to the factor mentioned above in certain villages .
