= Samabiyong Tea Garden =

- Village
- Location in West Bengal, India Samabiyong Tea Garden (India)
- Coordinates: 27.055000°N 88.655556°E
- Country: India
- State: West Bengal
- District: Darjeeling

Population (2011)
  - Total: 1,608
- Time zone: UTC+5:30 (IST)
- Vehicle registration: WB
- Lok Sabha constituency: Darjeeling
- Vidhan Sabha constituency: Kalimpong
- Website: kalimpong.gov.in

Samabiyong Tea Garden (also spelt as Samabeyong) is a village in the Gorubathan CD block in the Kalimpong Sadar subdivision of the Kalimpong district in the state of West Bengal, India.

== Geography ==
Places in the Kalimpong Sadar subdivision in Kalimpong district
CT: census town, R: rural/ urban centre, M: municipality, F: facility, NP: national park
Abbreviations used in names – TG for Tea Garden (town/village)
Owing to space constraints in the small map, the actual locations in a larger map may vary slightly

=== Location ===
Samabiyong Tea Garden is located at 27.055000°N 88.655556°E.

Samabeyong Tea Garden is 8 km from Lava.

=== Area overview ===
The map alongside shows the Kalimpong Sadar subdivision of Kalimpong district. Physiographically, this area forms the Kalimpong Range, with the average elevation varying from 300 to 3,000 metres (980 to 9,840 ft). This region is characterized by abruptly rising hills and numerous small streams. It is a predominantly rural area with 77.67% of the population living in rural areas and only 22.23% living in the urban areas. While Kalimpong is the only municipality, Dungra is the sole census town in the entire area. The economy is agro-based and there are 6 tea gardens in the Gorubathan CD block. In 2011, Kalimpong subdivision had a literacy rate of 81.85%, comparable with the highest levels of literacy in the districts of the state. While the first degree college in the subdivision was established at Kalimpong in 1962 the entire subdivision (and now the entire district), other than the head-quarters, had to wait till as late as 2015 (more than half a century) to have their first degree colleges at Pedong and Gorubathan.

Note: The map alongside presents some of the notable locations in the subdivision. All places marked in the map are linked in the larger full screen map.

== Demographics ==
According to the 2011 Census of India, Samabiyong Tea Garden had a total population of 1,608 of which 824 (51%) were males and 784 (49%) were females. There were 156 persons in the age range of 0 to 6 years. The total number of literate people in Samabiyong Tea Garden was 1,216 (83.75% of the population over 6 years).

== Economy ==
Samabeyong Tea Garden was established by the British Planters in 1887. The garden is located along hill slopes at an altitude of 6,500 feet (2,000 m).

== Tourism ==
"Samabeong is one of the most scenic places in the entire region." There is a hill-top lodge for tourists.
