= Rishyap =

- Village
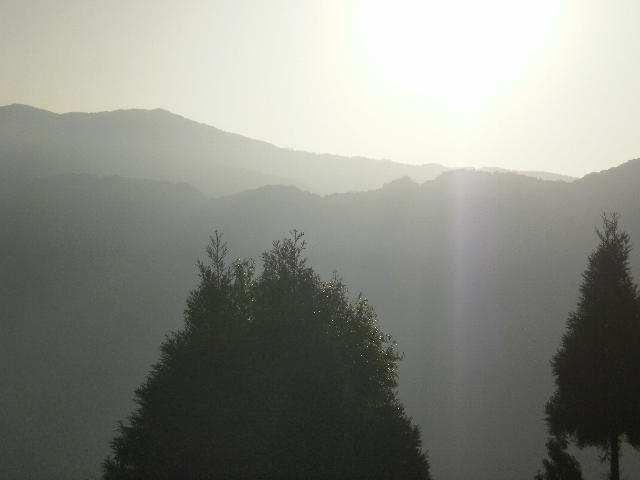

- Location in West Bengal, India Rishyap (India)
- Coordinates: 27.112111°N 88.649666°E
- Country: India
- State: West Bengal
- District: Kalimpong
- Time zone: UTC+5:30 (IST)
- Lok Sabha constituency: Darjeeling
- Vidhan Sabha constituency: Kalimpong
- Website: kalimpongdistrict.in

Rishyap (also spelled Rishop) is a village in the Kalimpong II CD block in the Kalimpong subdivision of the Kalimpong district in the Indian state of West Bengal.

Rishyap was developed as a tourist destination in 1998. There are many myths and legends associated with the name Rishyap - Ri stands for mountain peak (some say it is lofty) and shop means age-old trees in Tibetan.

== Geography ==
Places in the Kalimpong Sadar subdivision in Kalimpong district
CT: census town, R: rural/ urban centre, M: municipality, F: facility, NP: national park
Abbreviations used in names – TG for tea garden (town/village)
Owing to space constraints in the small map, the actual locations in a larger map may vary slightly

=== Location ===
Rishyap is located at 27.03N & 88.18E. It has an average elevation of 2591 meters (8500 feet).

=== Area overview ===
The map above shows the Kalimpong Sadar subdivision of Kalimpong district. Physiographically, this area forms the Kalimpong Range, with the average elevation varying from 300 to 3,000 metres (980 to 9,840 ft). This region is characterized by abruptly rising hills and numerous small streams. It is a predominantly rural area with 77.67% of the population living in rural areas and only 22.23% living in the urban areas. While Kalimpong is the only municipality, Dungra is the sole census town in the entire area. The economy is agro-based and there are 6 tea gardens in the Gorubathan CD block. In 2011, Kalimpong subdivision had a literacy rate of 81.85%, comparable with the highest levels of literacy in the districts of the state. While the first degree college in the subdivision was established at Kalimpong in 1962, the entire subdivision (and now the entire district), other than the head-quarters, had to wait till as late as 2015 (more than half a century) to have their first degree colleges at Pedong and Gorubathan.

Note: The map alongside presents some of the notable locations in the subdivision. All places marked in the map are linked in the larger full screen map.

== Tourist attractions ==
The area is known for its views of the Kanchenjunga range. Over the years, many tourists accommodations have come up at Rishyap. The local Sherpas and Lepchas have built small cottage-type accommodations for tourist. Tiffindara, a sunrise-view spot, is about 1 km from here.

== Transportation and connectivity ==
The village is about 10 km from Lava and 28 km from Kalimpong. National Highway No. 31 between Siliguri and Guwahati passes through Chalsa. The journey time from Chalsa to Rishyap is about 2 hours. The nearest railway station is New Jalpaiguri.

== Climate ==
During summer (March to May), the temperature varies from 22 °C to around 8 °C. Average winter (November to February) temperature is about 3 °C.

== See also ==
- List of hill stations in India
- Rishop travel guide from Wikivoyage
