= Suntalekhola =

- Village
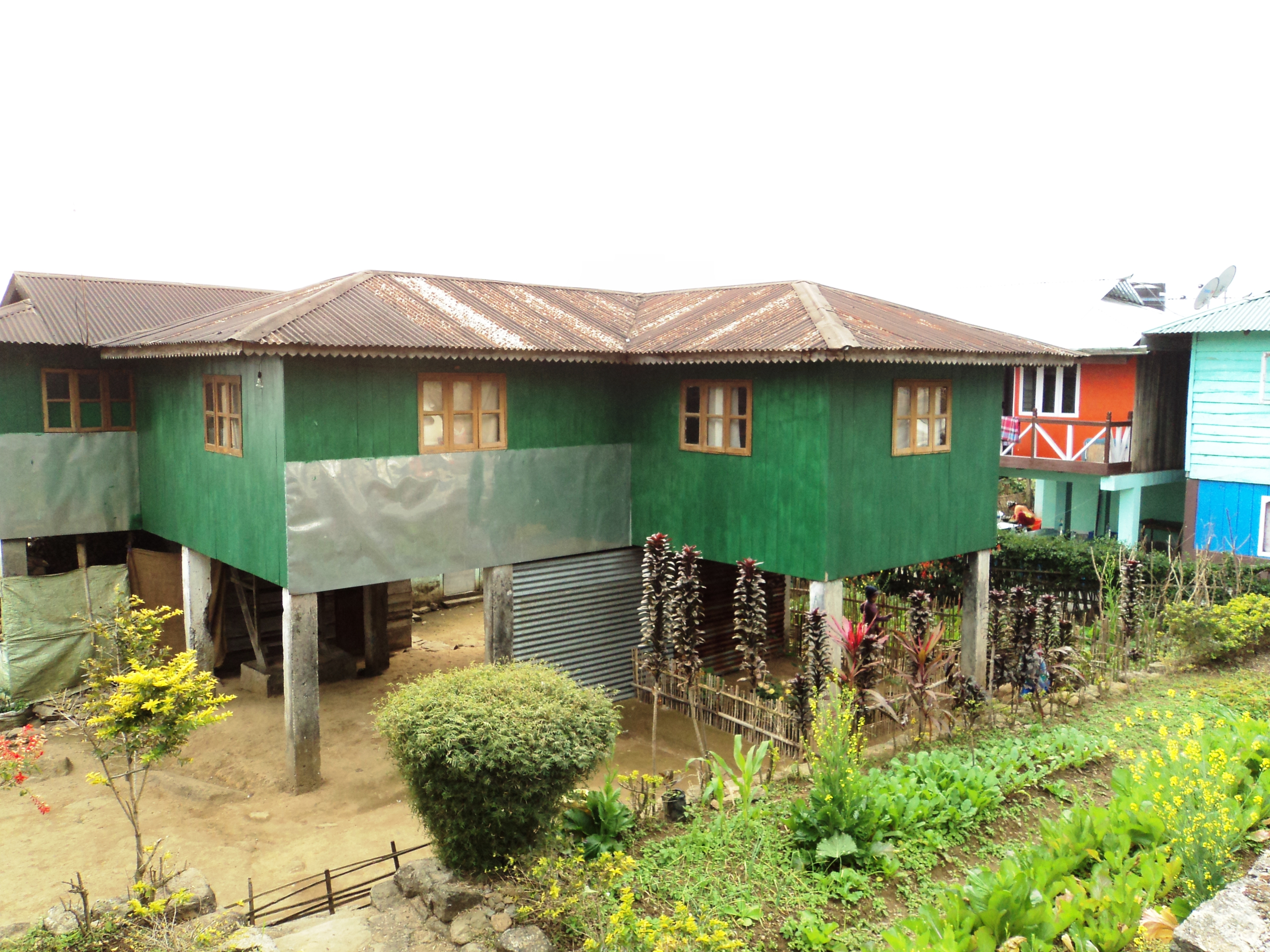
- Suntalekhola

- Location in West Bengal, India Suntalekhola (India)
- Coordinates: 27.013389°N 88.787778°E
- Country: India
- State: West Bengal
- District: Kalimpong

Languages
  - Official: Nepali, Bengali, English
- Time zone: UTC+5:30 (IST)
- Vehicle registration: WB
- Website: wb.gov.in

Suntalekhola or Suntaley Khola (also Suntaleykhola) is a village and a tourist spot in the Gorubathan CD block in the Kalimpong Sadar subdivision of Kalimpong District in the state of West Bengal, India.

== Etymology ==
In Nepali language, Suntaley means orange and khola means stream.

== Geography ==
Places in the Kalimpong Sadar subdivision in Kalimpong district
CT: census town, R: rural/ urban centre, M: municipality, F: facility, NP: national park
Abbreviations used in names – TG for Tea Garden (town/village)
Owing to space constraints in the small map, the actual locations in a larger map may vary slightly

=== Location ===
Suntalekhola is located at 27.013389°N 88.787778°E.

=== Area overview ===
The map alongside shows the Kalimpong Sadar subdivision of Kalimpong district. Physiographically, this area forms the Kalimpong Range, with the average elevation varying from 300 to 3,000 metres (980 to 9,840 ft). This region is characterized by abruptly rising hills and numerous small streams. It is a predominantly rural area with 77.67% of the population living in rural areas and only 22.23% living in the urban areas. While Kalimpong is the only municipality, Dungra is the sole census town in the entire area. The economy is agro-based and there are 6 tea gardens in the Gorubathan CD block. In 2011, Kalimpong subdivision had a literacy rate of 81.85%, comparable with the highest levels of literacy in the districts of the state. While the first degree college in the subdivision was established at Kalimpong in 1962 the entire subdivision (and now the entire district), other than the head-quarters, had to wait till as late as 2015 (more than half a century) to have their first degree colleges at Pedong and Gorubathan.

Note: The map alongside presents some of the notable locations in the subdivision. All places marked in the map are linked in the larger full screen map.

=== The place ===
The altitude of the place ranges from 650 to 950 m. It gets its name from a small stream: Suntaley Khola. This place is nearly 5 km from Samsing. The green patch on the left side of the way to Suntalekhola holds many varieties of birds and butterflies.

Species of birds are found here include: pond heron, black eagle, hill partridge, red-vented bulbul, ashy wood pigeon, bronzed drongo, white-throated fantail, blue rock thrush, scarlet minivet, lesser racket-tailed drongo, rufous sibia, grey treepie, spangled drongo and common green magpie. Many locals are involved in tourism-related business.

== Tourism ==
There are WBFDC cottages for the tourists to reside. Several trek routes originate from Suntalekhola, most of which are within the Neora Valley National Park, which is located adjacent to this place. It is known for its landscape with green tea gardens, hills and forests, which attract a lot of tourists.

There is a hanging bridge over the Murti river that provides access to the lodges or cottages of the Forest Department.
