= Lower Fagu Tea Garden =

- Village
- Location in West Bengal, India Lower Fagu Tea Garden (India)
- Coordinates: 26.9498°N 88.7132°E
- Country: India
- State: West Bengal
- District: Kalimpong
- Time zone: UTC+5:30 (IST)
- Vehicle registration: WB
- Lok Sabha constituency: Darjeeling
- Vidhan Sabha constituency: Kalimpong
- Website: kalimpongdistrict.in

Lower Fagu Tea Garden is a village in the Gorubathan CD block in the Kalimpong Sadar subdivision of Kalimpong district in West Bengal, India.

== Geography ==
Places in the Kalimpong Sadar subdivision in Kalimpong district
CT: census town, R: rural/ urban centre, M: municipality, F: facility, NP: national park
Abbreviations used in names – TG for Tea Garden (town/village)
Owing to space constraints in the small map, the actual locations in a larger map may vary slightly

=== Location ===
Lower Fagu Tea Garden is located at 26.9498°N 88.7132°E

=== Area overview ===
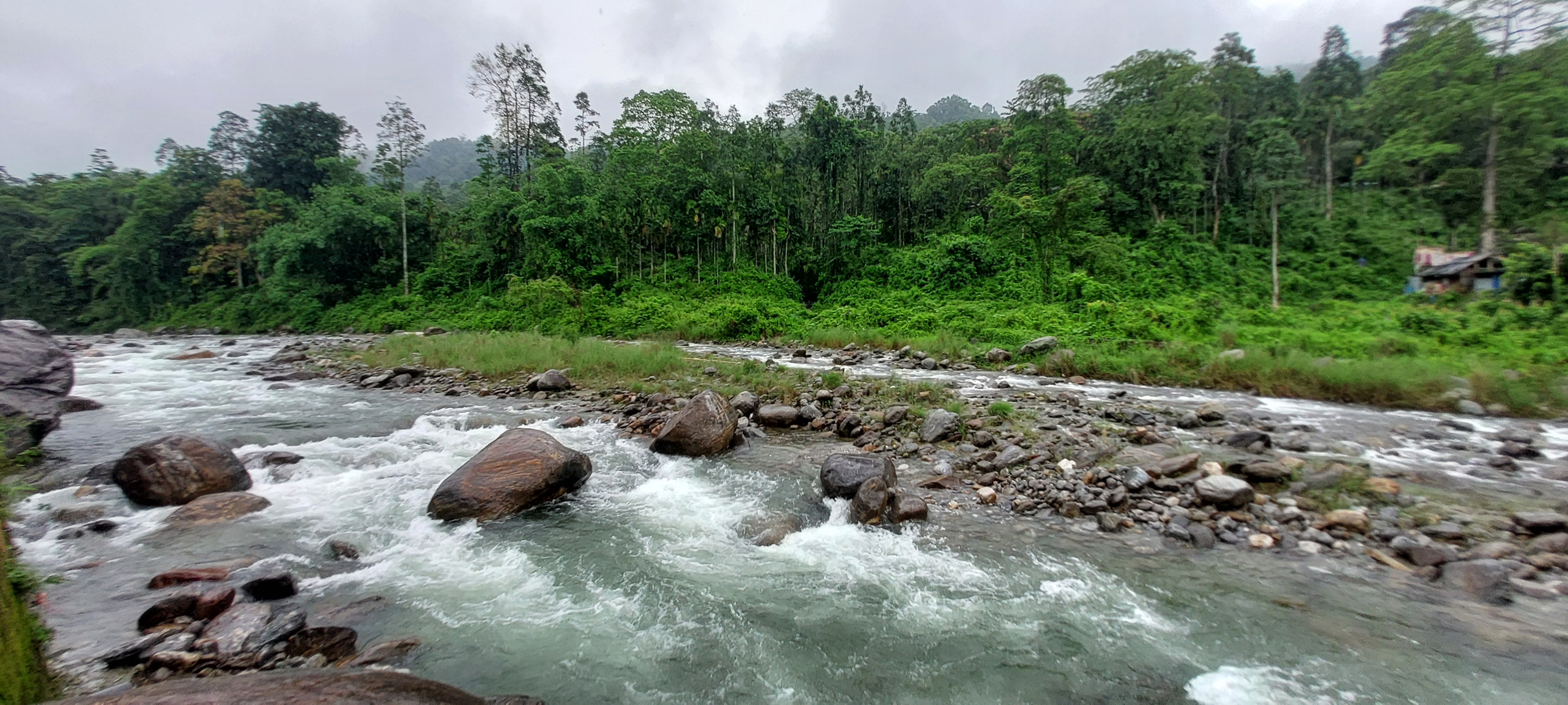
Fagu river valley

The map alongside shows the Kalimpong Sadar subdivision of Kalimpong district. Physiographically, this area forms the Kalimpong Range, with the average elevation varying from 300 to 3,000 metres (980 to 9,840 ft). This region is characterized by abruptly rising hills and numerous small streams. It is a predominantly rural area with 77.67% of the population living in rural areas and only 22.23% living in the urban areas. While Kalimpong is the only municipality, Dungra is the sole census town in the entire area. The economy is agro-based and there are 6 tea gardens in the Gorubathan CD block. In 2011, Kalimpong subdivision had a literacy rate of 81.85%, comparable with the highest levels of literacy in the districts of the state. While the first degree college in the subdivision was established at Kalimpong in 1962 the entire subdivision (and now the entire district), other than the head-quarters, had to wait till as late as 2015 (more than half a century) to have their first degree colleges at Pedong and Gorubathan.

Note: The map alongside presents some of the notable locations in the subdivision. All places marked in the map are linked in the larger full screen map.

=== The place ===
The area falls under the 43rd constituency of Gorkhaland Territorial Administration (GTA). It is situated on the eastern part of Chel river, Sombaray Bazar. The area is bordered in the south by Bhuttabari forest area, in the north by Ahaley Busty and in the east by Mission Hill Tea Estate. It lies about 60 km far from Siliguri, 20 km from Mal Bazar and 2 km from Sombaray Bazar. It comes under Gorubathan police station.

== Demographics ==
According to the 2011 Census of India, Lower Fagu Tea Garden had a total population of 2,070 of which 1,017 (49%) were males and 1,053 (51%) were females. There were 218 persons in the age range of 0 to 6 years. The total number of literate people in Lower Fagu Tea Garden was 1,356 (73.22% of the population over 6 years).

== Transport ==
The area is well connected by road. The nearest railway station is New Mal Junction which is about 20 km far from Fagu. Fagu can be reached via bus, small vehicles, hired taxi, etc. from Siliguri, Jalpaiguri, Darjeeling, Kakarvitta (Nepal), Mal Bazar, Gangtok and Kalimpong. State Highway 12 Passes through Fagu.

== Economy ==
The nearest market of Lower Fagu is Sombaray Bazar (Weekly Market organised on Monday/Sombaar). People go for weekly marketing on Monday and purchase their necessary household items. Ganti (Village market) is organised every Saturday just in front of Fagu tea factory where some local vendors sell locally cultivated items like vegetables, food items etc.

The area is one of the leading supplier of Areca Nut ( betel nut). The people generally sell their respective Areca nut garden to various businessmen who later supply it to different locations.

== Education ==
The one and only school of Lower Fagu is Lower Fagu Primary School (Estd-1956) being run by District Primary Board. Many of students enrolled are mainly children of Tea Garden worker. Apart from this another school namely Sanatan Vedic Primary School (Estd 1986) which is situated near Lower Fagu also attended by some students of Lower Fagu. One Private school namely Morning Glory English School is also run by some individual here. After completing the primary school, the students enrol themselves either in Judhabir Higher Secondary School or at other private schools as well as educational institutions at Kalimpong, Darjeeling & Siliguri etc. The one and only Degree College of Gorubathan is Government General Degree College, Gorubathan and offers Arts & Science courses. It was established in the year 2015 and is located in Lower Fagu (Fagu - Mission Hill Road).

== Major attraction ==
The major attraction of Lower Fagu is green Tea Garden. The green foothills around Fagu are a noteworthy attraction.. Apart from this one can spend time at Fagu bungalow which is located at the northernmost tip of Lower Fagu. The Fagu Bungalow was constructed by the then British tea garden owner during colonial era. Now it has been converted as The Fagu Reserve (website - www.thereserve.in). One can enjoy the beauty of some parts of Tarai areas, rivers and Dooars from here.

Gupteswar Temple of Lord Shiva is also located at Lower Fagu. It is one of the famous Hindu temples in the area. One Roman Catholic Church named St. Francis of Assisi also located here in the heart of Lower Fagu. A temple of Sri Satya Sai Baba is also situated here at top line.
