= Mongpong =

- Village
- Location in West Bengal, India Mongpong (India)
- Coordinates: 26.8776°N 88.5022°E
- Country: India
- State: West Bengal
- District: Kalimpong

Government
  - Body: Gram panchayat

Population (2011)
  - Total: 1,111

Languages
  - Official: Nepali, Bengali, English
- Time zone: UTC+5:30 (IST)
- ISO 3166 code: IN-WB
- Vehicle registration: WB
- Nearest city: Malbazar
- Website: kalimpongdistrict.in

Mongpong is a village in Kalimpong I, a community development block in India in the Kalimpong subdivision of the Kalimpong district of West Bengal.

== Geography ==
Places in the Kalimpong Sadar subdivision in Kalimpong district
CT: census town, R: rural/ urban centre, M: municipality, F: facility, NP: national park
Abbreviations used in names – TG for Tea Garden (town/village)
Owing to space constraints in the small map, the actual locations in a larger map may vary slightly

=== Location ===
Mongpong is located at 26.8776°N 88.5022°E.

=== Area overview ===
The map alongside shows the Kalimpong Sadar subdivision of Kalimpong district. Physiographically, this area forms the Kalimpong Range, with the average elevation varying from 300 to 3,000 metres (980 to 9,840 ft). This region is characterized by abruptly rising hills and numerous small streams. It is a predominantly rural area with 77.67% of the population living in rural areas and only 22.23% living in the urban areas. While Kalimpong is the only municipality, Dungra is the sole census town in the entire area. The economy is agro-based and there are 6 tea gardens in the Gorubathan CD block. In 2011, Kalimpong subdivision had a literacy rate of 81.85%, comparable with the highest levels of literacy in the districts of the state. While the first degree college in the subdivision was established at Kalimpong in 1962 the entire subdivision (and now the entire district), other than the head-quarters, had to wait till as late as 2015 (more than half a century) to have their first degree colleges at Pedong and Gorubathan.

Note: The map alongside presents some of the notable locations in the subdivision. All places marked in the map are linked in the larger full screen map.

The village is on the bank of the Teesta River.

== Demographics ==
According to the 2011 Census of India, Mongpong Forest had a total population of 1,111 of which 598 (54%) were males and 513 (46%) were females. There were 151 persons in the age range of 0 to 6 years. The total number of literate people in Mongpong Forest was 668 (69.58% of the population over 6 years).
