= Damdim railway station =

Railway station in West Bengal

Damdim Railway Station
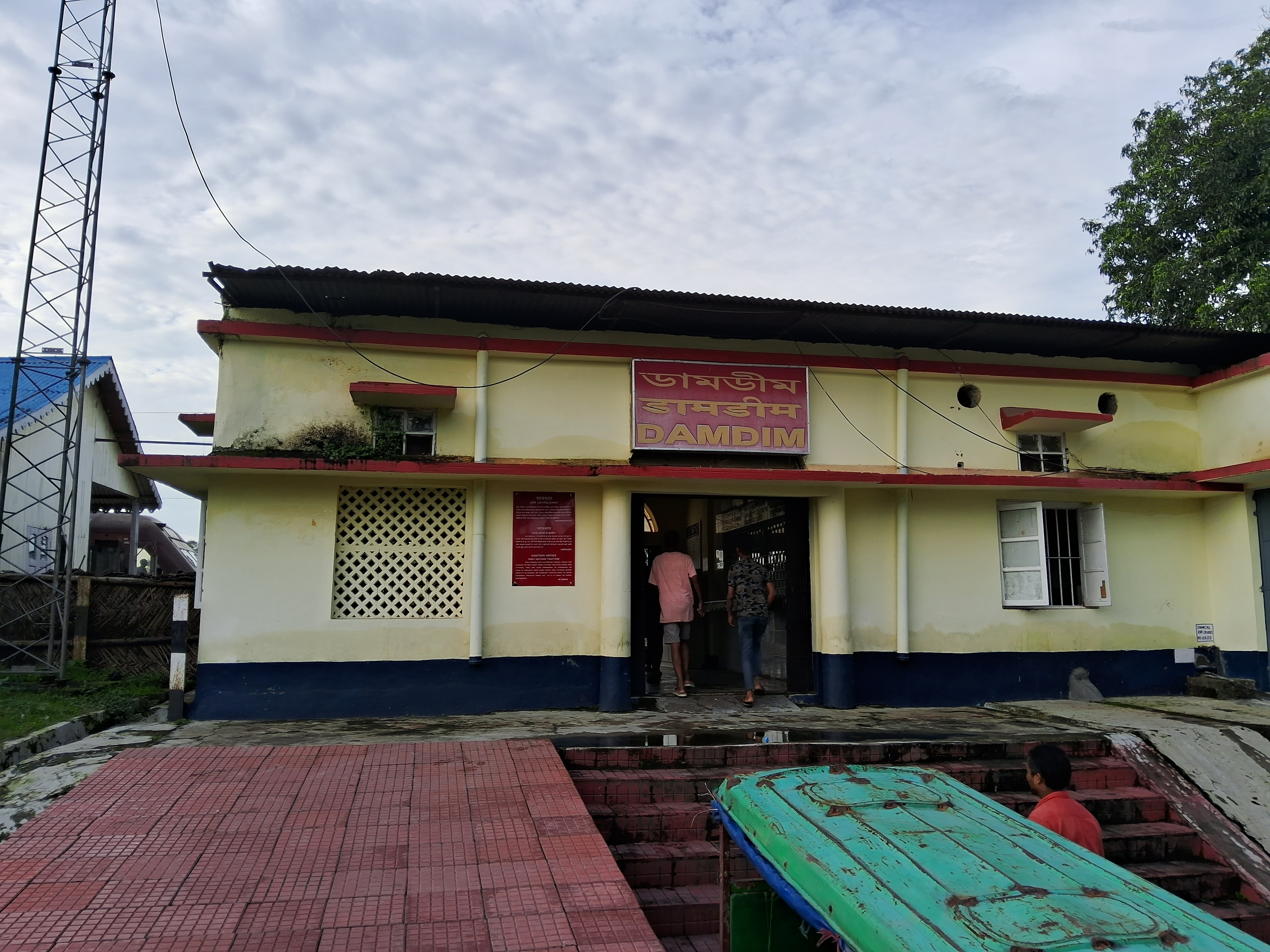

General information
- Location: National Highway 17, dam dim, Dist - Jalpaiguri State: West Bengal; India
- Coordinates: 26.8656°N 88.6698°E
- Elevation: 162 metres (531 ft)
- System: Indian Railways Station
- Owner: Indian Railways
- Operator: Northeast Frontier Railway zone
- Line: New Jalpaiguri–Alipurduar–Samuktala Road line
- Platforms: 1
- Tracks: 2 (broad gauge)

Construction
- Structure type: At grade
- Parking: Available

Other information
- Status: Functioning
- Station code: DDM
- Zone(s): Northeast Frontier Railway zone
- Division(s): Alipurduar
Location
- Location within West Bengal Location within India

Damdim railway station is the railway station which serves the areas of Dam Dim, Jalpaiguri district, Gorubathan, Kalimpong district and other nearby areas like Fagu tea gardens, etc lying on Doars region in the Indian state of West Bengal. It lies in the New Jalpaiguri–Alipurduar–Samuktala Road line of Northeast Frontier Railway zone, Alipurduar railway division.

== Trains ==
Major trains running from Damdim Railway Station are as follows:

- Siliguri Bamanhat Intercity Express.
- Siliguri–Alipurduar Intercity Express
