= Nathuahat =

Nathuahat is a famous countryside in Jalpaiguri District in the state of West Bengal, India. It is located along the foothill regions of the Himalayas. The Longitude and Latitude of this village is 26.7145° N, 88.9043° E. The Daina River flows along the western margin of the village, and the Jaldhaka and Rangati rivers also course through the village. This village is 57 KM away from its District Town. Nearest Railway Station is Dhupguri Railway Station which is 20 KM away. One of the key attraction of this village is Tea Garden. Jaldhaka Altadanga Tea Estate is the name of the factory which is established at around 1985. This has three higher secondary schools namely Baniapara Chowrasta High School, Nathuahat Dhapidevi Balika Viidyalaya High School and Nathuahat Ashram Govt. Sponsored High School along with one ITI college named as Ramkrishna Sevashram Govt. ITI College and notable people Nitish Ch Basu, Bikram Das (social worker), Pralay Kr Das (politician), Ram Dutta (politician), Rajib Bhattacharjee (politician), Avijit Dey, Biplob Das, Sajal Nag many .Oindrila Dey is a famous artist of Nathuahat. Arka Das is an eminent make up artist of Nathuahat.It is the birth place of Debojyot Roy, a tabla player .
