= Jaldhaka =

- Town
- Location in West Bengal, India Jaldhaka (India)
- Coordinates: 27.0372°N 88.8732°E
- Country: India
- State: West Bengal
- District: Kalimpong
- Time zone: UTC+5:30 (IST)
- Vehicle registration: WB
- Lok Sabha constituency: Darjeeling
- Vidhan Sabha constituency: Kalimpong
- Website: kalimpongdistrict.in

Jaldhaka (also referred to as Jhalong) is a small town in the Gorubathan CD block in the Kalimpong Sadar subdivision of the Kalimpong district in the state of West Bengal, India. It lies on the bank of Jaldhaka River.

== Geography ==
Places in the Kalimpong Sadar subdivision in Kalimpong district
CT: census town, R: rural/ urban centre, M: municipality, F: facility, NP: national park
Abbreviations used in names – TG for Tea Garden (town/village)
Owing to space constraints in the small map, the actual locations in a larger map may vary slightly

=== Location ===
Jaldhaka is located at 27.0372°N 88.8732°E.

Jaldhaka is shown as being a part of Paten Godak Khasmahal mouza in the map of Gorubathan CD block on page 197 of District Statistical Handbook, Darjeeling, 2011.

=== Area overview ===
The map alongside shows the Kalimpong Sadar subdivision of Kalimpong district. Physiographically, this area forms the Kalimpong Range, with the average elevation varying from 300 to 3,000 metres (980 to 9,840 ft). This region is characterized by abruptly rising hills and numerous small streams. It is an predominantly rural area with 77.67% of the population living in rural areas and only 22.23% living in the urban areas. While Kalimpong is the only municipality, Dungra is the sole census town in the entire area. The economy is agro-based and there are 6 tea gardens in the Gorubathan CD block. In 2011, Kalimpong subdivision had a literacy rate of 81.85%, comparable with the highest levels of literacy in the districts of the state. While the first degree college in the subdivision was established at Kalimpong in 1962 the entire subdivision (and now the entire district), other than the head-quarters, had to wait until as late as 2015 (more than half a century) to have their first degree colleges at Pedong and Gorubathan.

Note: The map alongside presents some of the notable locations in the subdivision. All places marked in the map are linked in the larger full screen map.

== Police station ==
Jaldhaka police station has jurisdiction over Gorubathan and Kalimpong II CD blocks.

== Economy ==
Jaldhaka Hydroelectric Power Project has a design capacity of 27 MWe. It has five units, the first was commissioned in 1967 and the last in 1983. It is operated by the West Bengal State Electricity Distribution Company. In the stage I it had 3 x 9 = 27 MW and in stage II it had 2 x4 = 8 MW capacity.

== Healthcare ==
There is a primary health centre, with 2 beds, at Jaldhaka.
