= Jaldhaka River =

River in India, Bhutan and Bangladesh

Coordinates: 27.0297°N 88.8747°E

Jaldhaka River Di Chu
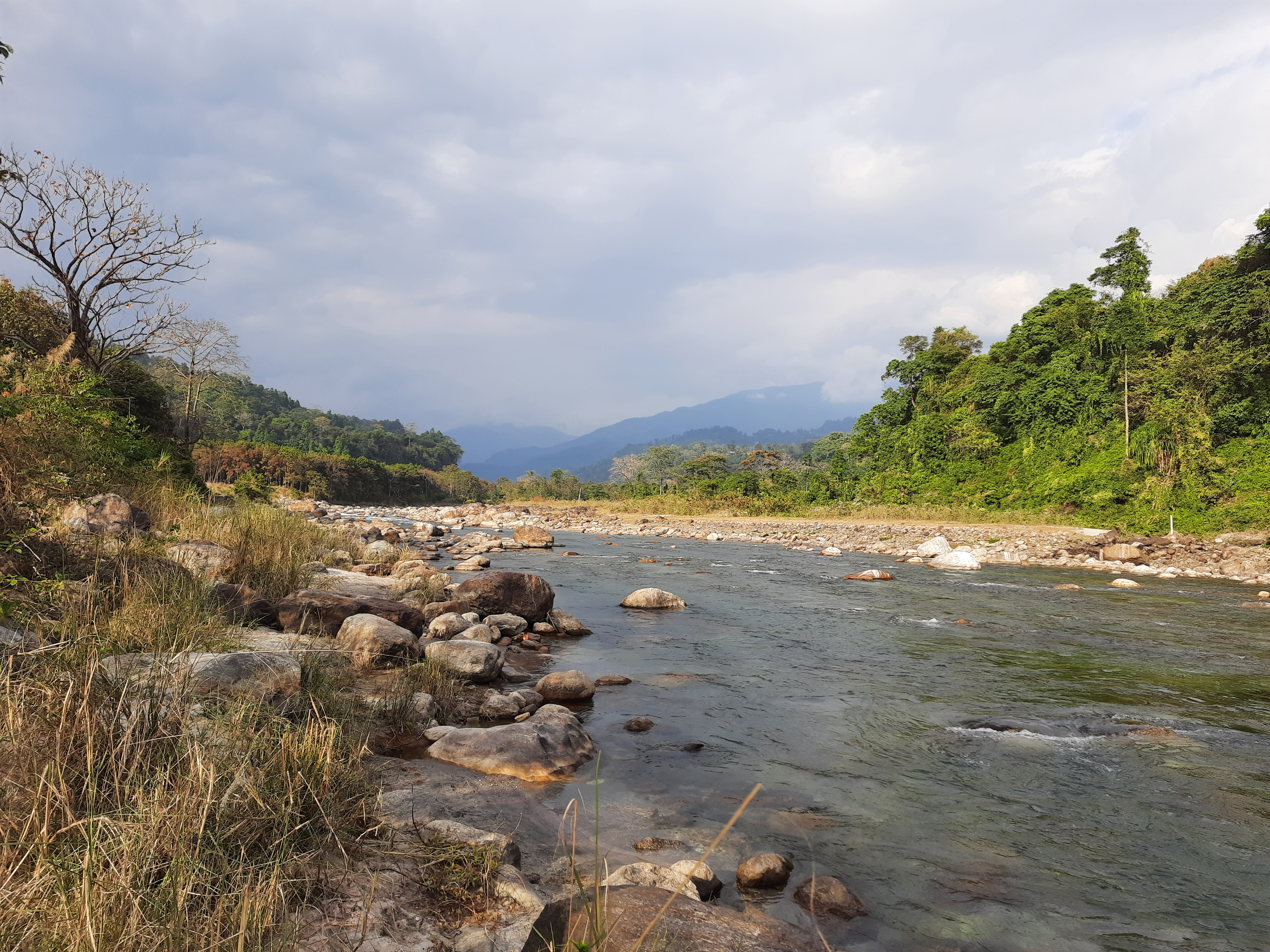

Location
- Countries: India; Bhutan; Bangladesh
- Districts: Gangtok district, India; Pakyong District India; Samtse Bhutan; Kalimpong India; Jalpaiguri India; Cooch Behar India; Lalmonirhat Bangladesh; Kurigram Bangladesh.
- States: Sikkim India; Samtse Bhutan; West Bengal India; Rangpur Bangladesh.

Physical characteristics
- Source: Bitang Lake
  - location: Kupup, Gangtok district, Sikkim, India
- Mouth: Dharla River, Brahmaputra
  - location: Lalmonirhat District, Bangladesh

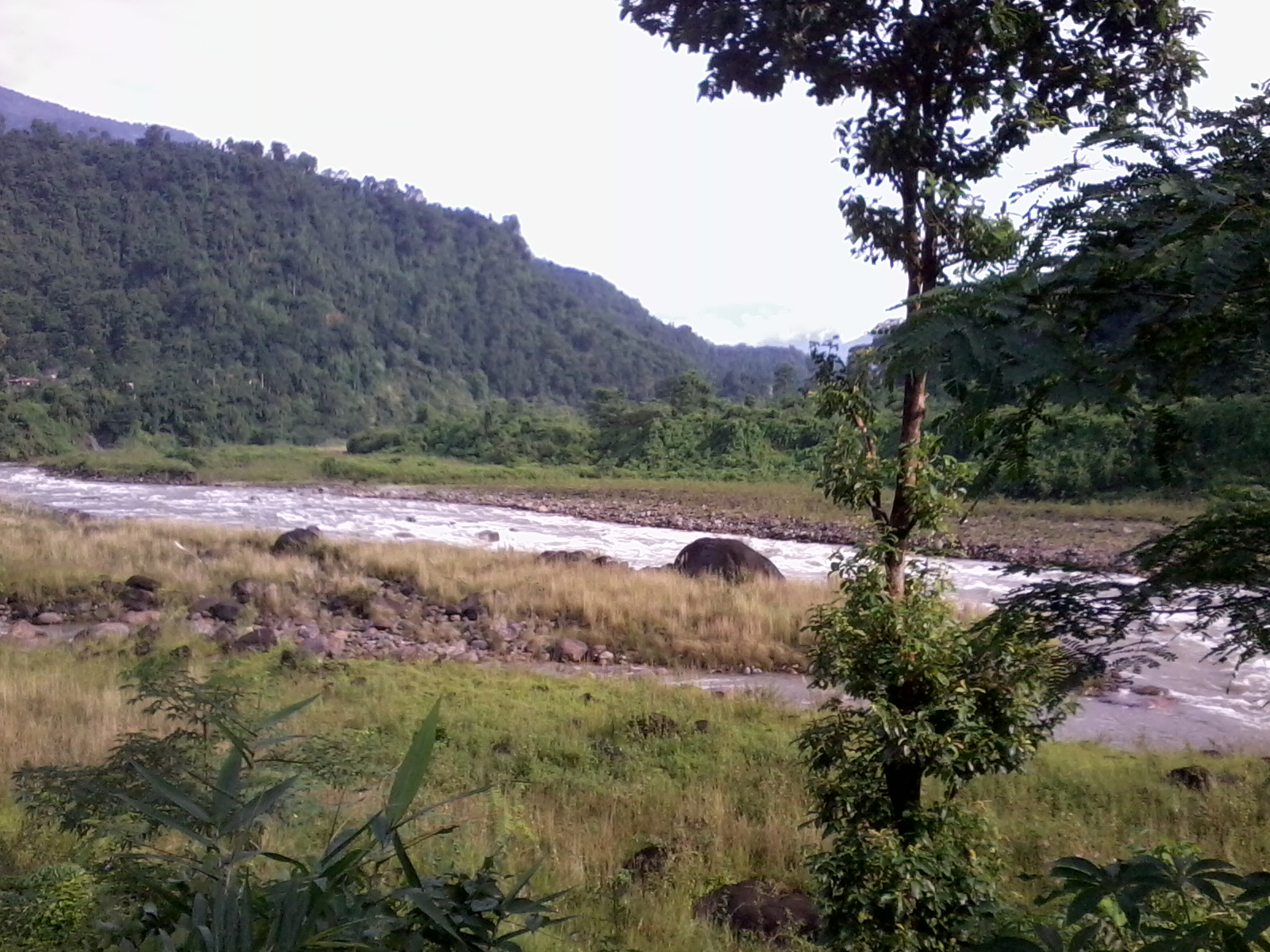
Jaldhaka River in Kalimpong district

The Jaldhaka River (Pron:/ˌdʒælˈdɑːkə/), also known as Dichu, is a tributary of the Brahmaputra and a trans-boundary river flowing through India, Bhutan and Bangladesh with a length of 233 kilometres. It originates from the Bitang Lake at Kupup, Gangtok District, Sikkim, near the Jelep La pass below Dongkya Mountain Range. It flows through Pakyong District of Sikkim, India and then passes through forests of Samtse District of Bhutan where it flows for around 40 kilometres and then re-enters India at Bindu, Kalimpong district. Further it passes through Chapramari Wildlife Sanctuary and Gorumara National Park in West Bengal along with cities and towns, like Paren, Gairibas, Jhalong, Dhupguri, Falakata, Mathabhanga and flows through Kalimpong, Jalpaiguri and Cooch Behar districts in West Bengal, India before entering Bangladesh at Mogolhat, Lalmonirhat District of Rangpur Division. It is known as Dharla River in Bangladesh and flows through towns like Kolaghat, Phulbari and Kurigram City and Passes southwards until the Dharla debouches into the Brahmaputra River at Bagua Anantpur of Kurigram District. Due to the river's wandering over several international borders, only a small length of the river lies in Bangladesh and Bhutan and most of its path lies in India. In some places, this river is also known as Mansai river and Singhimari river.

== Geography ==
Jaldhak or Dichu originates from the Kupup Lake, a small glacial lake in Sikkim. It gains volume through the confluence of two other streams near Bindu, viz., Bindu Khola and Dudh Pokhri. The combined stream meet at Bindu to increase the volume of Jaldhaka River, thus forming a riverine boundary with India and Bhutan in the left bank. The main tributaries that join the river on its right bank are the Murti, the Jholung khola, the Naksal Khola, the Sutunga and the Jarda in the lower reach. The Diana, Rehti-Duduya and Mujnai are the main left bank tributaries.

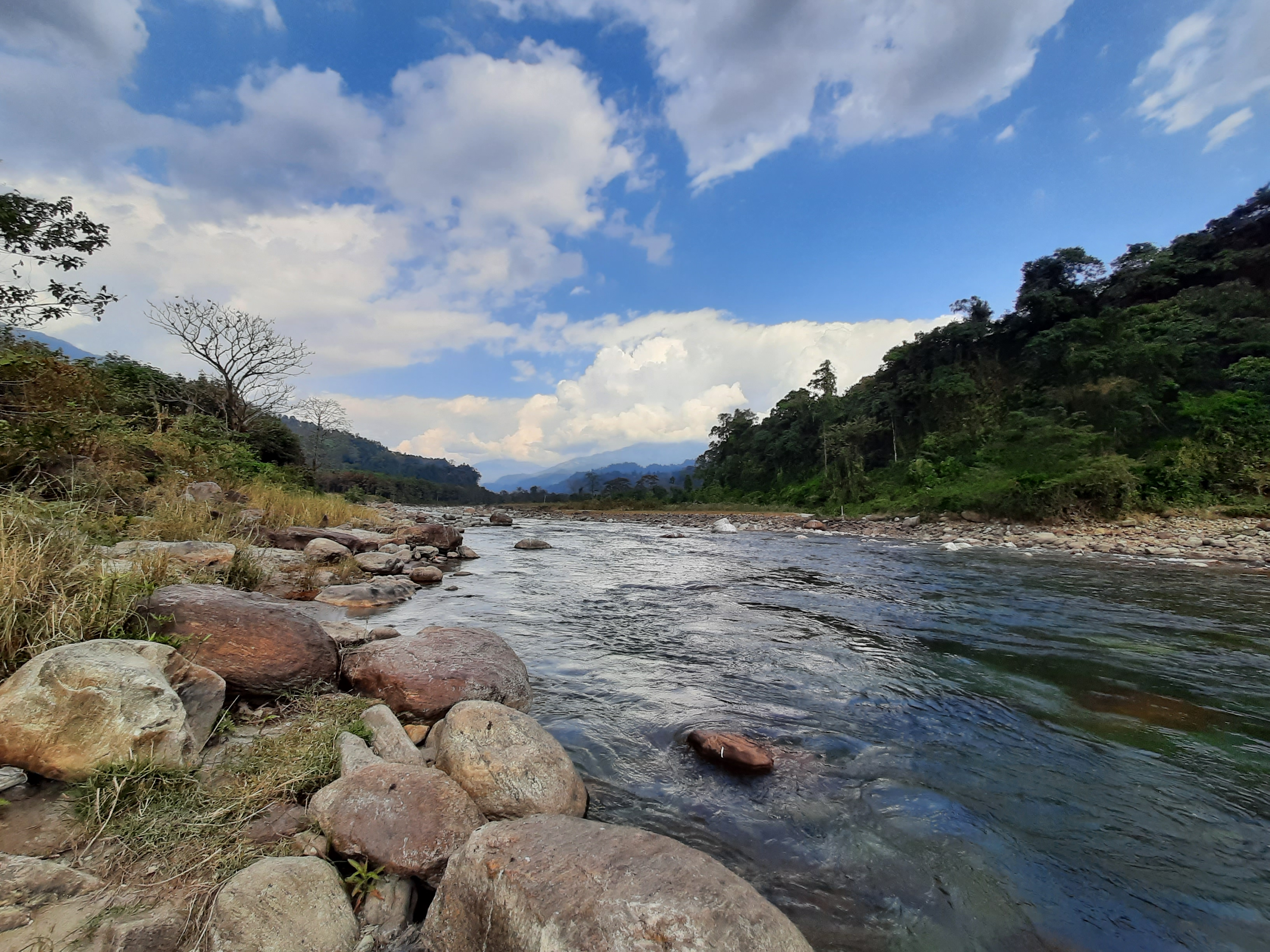
Jaldhaka River at the Nakshal Picnic Ground, India - Bhutan Border

The river flows through the three North Bengal districts of Kalimpong, Jalpaiguri and Cooch Bihar. The entire watershed is the most fertile agricultural zone along with the Teesta Basin. The upper course is famous for crops like ginger, medicinal herbs and fruits like oranges and pomegranate. The middle course comprising Jalpaiguri district is entirely tea and corn dominated and the lower course is dominated by rice, jute and tobacco. The inter-river formed lands are cultivated with crops like bamboo and mat sticks. In the lower basin, the inter-river lands are cultivated with banana.

The river enters Bangladesh at Ghoksadanga district to meet the Brahmaputra or the Jamuna as it is known there.

== Floods ==
River Jaldhaka, along with River Teesta have caused major flooding multiple times in Bangladesh during monsoon season between June and September.

== See also ==
- River Teesta
