= Gorubathan (community development block) =

- Community development block
- Coordinates: 26.96°N 88.69°E
- Country: India
- State: West Bengal
- District: Kalimpong

Government
  - Type: Community development block

Area
  - Total: 442.72 km^{2} (170.94 sq mi)

Population (2011)
  - Total: 60,663
  - Density: 137.02/km^{2} (354.89/sq mi)
- Time zone: UTC+5:30 (IST)
- Lok Sabha constituency: Darjeeling
- Vidhan Sabha constituency: Kalimpong

Gorubathan is a community development block (CD block) that forms an administrative division in the Kalimpong subdivision of the Kalimpong district in the Indian state of West Bengal.

== Geography ==
Gorubathan is located at 26°58′N 88°41′E.

The snow-clad mountain ranges, a little to the north of the old Darjeeling district, form the main Himalayan range. Ranges/ ridges branching out from the main Himalayas pass through Darjeeling district. To the north-west towers the giant Kangchenjunga 28,146 ft (8,579 m) and to the north-east is Dongkya 23,184 ft (7,066 m). From Kangchenjunga the Singalila Ridge slopes down southward forming the border between India and Nepal. Manebhanjyang, Sandakphu and Phalut are popular trekking destinations on this ridge. It continues south and south-east through Tunglu and Senchal and other spurs that form the Darjeeling Hills west of the Teesta. To the east of the Teesta, a lofty ridge runs south of Dongkya, bifurcating at Gipmochi 11,518 ft (3,511 m), forming two spurs that contain the valley of the Jaldhaka. The lower portion of this hilly region forms the Kalimpong Hills. Four great hill ranges radiate from a single point at Ghum, a saddle 7,372 ft (2,247 m) high – the first, the Ghum range running due west to Simanabasti; the second, the Senchal-Mahaldiram range sloping south towards Kurseong, the highest points being East Senchel 8,600 ft (2,600 m), Tiger Hill 8,515 ft (2,595 m) and West Senchel 8,163 ft (2,488 m); the third, the Takdah or Takbu range, sloping north-east to a point above the junction of the Great Rangit and Teesta; the fourth, the Darjeeling Jalapahar Range, extending northwards towards Darjeeling.

Gorubathan CD block is part of the Kalimpong Range physiographic region. The average elevation varies from 300 m to 3,000 m above sea level. “This region is characterised by abruptly rising hills and numerous small river streams coming down in the north-south direction.”

Gorubathan CD block is bounded by Bhutan on the north and east, Mal and Matiali CD blocks in Jalpaiguri district on the south and Kalimpong I and Kalimpong II CD blocks on the west.

The Gorubathan CD block has an area of 442.72 km^{2}. It has 1 panchayat samity, 11 gram panchayats, 91 gram sansads (village councils), 38 mouzas and 27 inhabited villages. Jaldhaka police station serves this block Headquarters of this CD block is at Gorubathan.

Gram panchayats in Gorubathan CD block are: Aahaley, Dalim, Garubathan I, Garubathan II, Kumai, Nim, Patengodak, Pokhreybong, Rongo, Samsing and Todeytangta.

== Demographics ==
=== Population ===
According to the 2011 Census of India, the Gorubathan CD block had a total population of 60,663, all of which were rural. There were 31,053 (51%) males and 29,609 (49%) females. There were 6,441 persons in the age range of 0 to 6 years. The Scheduled Castes numbered 4,027 (6.64%) and the Scheduled Tribes numbered 14,315 (23.60%).

Large villages (with 4,000+ population) in the Gorubathan CD block are (2011 census figures in brackets): Today Tangta Khasmahal (5,290), Paten Godak Khasmahal (5,530), Rango Forest (9,131) and Gorubathan (5,291).

Other villages in the Gorubathan CD block include (2011 census figures in brackets): Dalingma (821), Kumai Tea Garden (3,907), Kumai Khasmhal (1,590), Kumai Forest (1,393), Nim Khasmahal (1,764), Samsing (3,711), Lower Fagu Tea Garden (2,070) and Samabiyong Tea Garden (1,608).

=== Literacy ===
According to the 2011 census the total number of literate persons in the Gorubathan CD block was 41,687 (76.88% of the population over 6 years) out of which males numbered 23,324 (84.21% of the male population over 6 years) and females numbered 18,363 (69.23% of the female population over 6 years). The gender disparity (the difference between female and male literacy rates) was 14.97%.

See also – List of West Bengal districts ranked by literacy rate

Literacy in CD blocks of
Darjeeling district (2011)
Darjeeling Sadar subdivision
Darjeeling Pulbazar – 80.78%
Rangli Rangliot – 80.50%
Jorebunglow Sukhiapokhri – 82.54%
Kalimpong subdivision
Kalimpong I – 81.43%
Kalimpong II – 79.68%
Gorubathan – 76.88%
Kurseong subdivision
Kurseong – 81.15%
Mirik subdivision
Mirik – 80.84%
Siliguri subdivision
Matigara – 74.78%
Naxalbari – 75.47%
Phansidewa – 64.46%
Kharibari – 67.37%
2011 Census: CD Block Wise

Primary Census Abstract Data

=== Language and religion ===
Religion in Gorubathan CD block (2011)
Hinduism	67.60%
Buddhism	21.06%
Christianity	9.31%
Kirat Mundhum	1.15%
Islam	0.53%
Other or not stated	0.36%

In the 2011 census, Hindus numbered 41,009 and formed 67.60% of the population in the Gorubathan CD block. Buddhists numbered 12,776 and formed 21.06% of the population. Christians numbered 5,645 and formed 9.31% of the population. Muslims numbered 319 and formed 0.53% of the population. Others numbered 914 and formed 1.51% of the population.

Languages of Gorubathan CD block (2011)
1. Nepali (91.8%)
2. Sadri (4.11%)
3. Hindi (1.33%)
4. Others (2.71%)

At the time of the 2011 census, 91.85% of the population spoke Nepali, 4.11% Sadri and 1.33% Hindi as their first language.

The West Bengal Official Language Act 1961 declared that Bengali and Nepali were to be used for official purposes in the three hill subdivisions of Darjeeling, Kalimpong and Kurseong in Darjeeling district.

== Rural poverty ==
According to the Rural Household Survey in 2005, 24.40% of the total number of families were BPL families in the Darjeeling district. According to a World Bank report, as of 2012, 4-9% of the population in Darjeeling, North 24 Parganas and South 24 Parganas districts were below poverty level, the lowest among the districts of West Bengal, which had an average 20% of the population below poverty line.

== Economy ==
=== Livelihood ===
Livelihood
in Gorubathan CD block
1. Cultivators (31.0%)
2. Agricultural labourers (19.5%)
3. Household industries (4.08%)
4. Other Workers (45.5%)

In the Gorubathan CD block in 2011, among the class of total workers, cultivators numbered 7,480 and formed 30.99%, agricultural labourers numbered 4,700 and formed 19.47%, household industry workers numbered 986 and formed 4.08% and other workers numbered 10,973 and formed 45.46%. Total workers numbered 25,139 and formed 39.79% of the total population, and non-workers numbered 36,524 and formed 60.21% of the population.

Note: In the census records a person is considered a cultivator, if the person is engaged in cultivation/ supervision of land owned by self/government/institution. When a person who works on another person's land for wages in cash or kind or share, is regarded as an agricultural labourer. Household industry is defined as an industry conducted by one or more members of the family within the household or village, and one that does not qualify for registration as a factory under the Factories Act. Other workers are persons engaged in some economic activity other than cultivators, agricultural labourers and household workers. It includes factory, mining, plantation, transport and office workers, those engaged in business and commerce, teachers, entertainment artistes and so on.

=== Infrastructure ===
There are 27 inhabited villages in the Gorubathan CD block, as per the District Census Handbook, Darjiling, 2011. 100% villages have power supply. 24 villages (87.89%) have drinking water supply. 8 villages (29.63%) have post offices. 14 villages (51.85%) have telephones (including landlines, public call offices and mobile phones). 13 villages (48.15%) have pucca (paved) approach roads and 8 villages (29.63%) have transport communication (includes bus service, rail facility and navigable waterways). 2 villages (7.41%) have agricultural credit societies and 4 villages (14.81%) have banks.

=== Agriculture ===
In 2012-13, there were 1 fertiliser depot, 1 seed store and 33 fair price shops in Gorubathan CD block.

In 2013–14, Gorubathan CD block produced 1,163 tonnes of Aman paddy, the main winter crop, from 643 hectares, 75 tonnes of wheat from 66 hectares, 4,822 tonnes of maize from 1,578 hectares and 5,820 tonnes of potatoes from 364 hectares. It also produced some pulses and oilseeds.

=== Tea gardens ===
Darjeeling tea “received the iconic status due to its significant aroma, taste and colour… the first Indian product to be marked with the Geographical Indication (GI) tag in 2003… As per the definition, “Darjeeling Tea” can only refer to tea that has been cultivated, grown, produced, manufactured and processed in tea gardens in few specific hilly areas of the district.” Apart from the hill areas, tea is also grown in the plain areas of the terai and dooars, but such gardens are not covered under the GI tag.

As of 2009-10, there were 87 tea gardens covered under the GI tag, employing 51,091 persons. Total land under cultivation was 17,828.38 hectares and total production was 7.36 million kg. A much larger population is indirectly dependent on the tea industry in the district. The average annual production including those from the plain areas, exceeds 10 million kg.

As of 2013, Darjeeling subdivision had 46 tea estates, Kalimpong subdivision had 29 tea estates and Kurseong subdivision had 6 tea gardens. This added up to 81 tea estates in the hill areas. Bannackburn Tea Estate and Lingia Tea Estate in Darjeeling were the first to come up in 1835. Siliguri subdivision in the terai region had 45 tea estates.

=== Banking ===
In 2012-13, Gorubathan CD block had offices of 1 commercial bank and 2 gramin banks.

== Transport ==
Gorubathan CD block has 1 originating/ terminating bus route. The nearest railway station is 12 km from the block headquarters.

State Highway 12 and National Highway 717A passes through Gorubathan CD block.

== Education ==
In 2012-13, Gorubathan CD block had 100 primary schools with 8,387 students, 4 middle schools with 1,593 students, 4 high schools with 2,007 students and 2 higher secondary schools with 3,065 students. Gorubathan CD block had 158 institutions for special and non-formal education with 8,808 students.

See also – Education in India

According to the 2011 census, in Gorubathan CD block, among the 27 inhabited villages, all villages had primary schools, 21 villages had two or more primary schools, 18 villages had at least 1 primary and 1 middle school and 9 villages had at least 1 middle and 1 secondary school.

Government General Degree College, Gorubathan, was established in 2015 at Gorubathan. It offers undergraduate courses in arts and science.

== Healthcare ==
In 2013, Gorubathan CD block had 1 hospital, 1 block primary health centre and 2 primary health centre with total 40 beds and 2 doctors (excluding private bodies). It had 12 family welfare subcentres. 1,522 patients were treated indoor and 19,745 patients were treated outdoor in the hospitals, health centres and subcentres of the CD block.

Gourbathan Block Primary Health Centre, with 25 beds at Gorubathan, PO Fagu, is the major government medical facility in the Gorubathan CD block. There are primary health centres at Jaldhaka (with 2 beds) and Shirpagaon (with 2 beds).
