= Kalimpong subdivision =

- Subdivision
- Coordinates: 27.06°N 88.47°E
- Country: India
- State: West Bengal
- District: Kalimpong
- Headquarters: Kalimpong

Languages
  - Official: Bengali and Nepali
  - Additional official: English
- Time zone: UTC+5:30 (IST)
- ISO 3166 code: IN-WB
- Vehicle registration: WB
- Website: wb.gov.in

The Kalimpong subdivision is the sole subdivision of the Kalimpong district in the state of West Bengal, India. It was initially formed as a subdivision of the Darjeeling district in 1916 under British India. On 14 February 2017 the subdivision was promoted to a district, becoming an independent Kalimpong district. The subdivision has its headquarters at Kalimpong Town and consists of the hilly areas annexed from Bhutan at the end of the Anglo-Bhutanese War in 1865.

== Subdivision ==
Kalimpong district has only one administrative subdivision:

Subdivision	Headquarters	Area km^{2}	Population (2011)	Rural Population % (2011)	Urban Population % (2011)
Kalimpong	Kalimpong	1053.12	251,642	77.67	22.23

Places in the Kalimpong subdivision
CT: census town, R: rural/ urban centre, M: municipality, F: facility, NP: national park
Abbreviations used in names – TG for Tea Garden (town/village)
Owing to space constraints in the small map, the actual locations in a larger map may vary slightly

== Administrative areas ==
Apart from the Kalimpong municipality that consists of 23 wards, the subdivision contained rural areas of 42 gram panchayats. As of 2021, these areas divided under four community development blocks: Kalimpong–I, Lava, Pedong, and Gorubathan. Prior to the bifurcation in 2021, Lava and Pedong blocks constituted a single block termed Kalimpong–II.

== Gram Panchayats ==
- Kalimpong I block consists of rural areas with 18 gram panchayats, viz. Bong, Kalimpong, Samalbong, Tista, Dr. Grahams Homes, Lower Echhay, Samthar, Neembong, Dungra, Upper Echhay, Seokbir, Bhalukhop, Yangmakum, Pabringtar, Sindepong, Kafer Kanke Bong, Pudung and Tashiding.
- Kalimpong II block (now Lava and Pedong blocks) consists of rural areas only with 13 gram panchayats, viz. Dalapchand, Kashyong, Lolay, Lingseykha, Gitdabling, lava-Gitabeong, Payong, Kagay, Lingsey, Sangsay, Pedong, Syakiyong and Shantook.
- Gorubathan block consists of rural areas only with 11 gram panchayats, viz. Dalim, Gorubathan–I, Gorubathan–II, Patengodak, Todey Tangta, Kumai, Pokhreybong, Samsing, Aahaley, Nim and Rongo.

== Police stations ==
Police stations in the Darjeeling Sadar subdivision have the following features and jurisdiction:

Police Station	Area covered km^{2}	International border	Inter-state border km	Municipal town	CD block
Kalimpong	n/a	-	-	Kalimpong	-
Gorubthan	n/a	-	n/a	-	Kalimpong I
Jaldhaka	n/a	n/a	n/a	-	Kalimpong II, Gorubathan

== Blocks ==
Community development blocks in Kalimpong subdivision are:

CD block	Headquarters	Area km^{2}	Population (2011)	SC %	ST %	Literacy rate %	Census Towns
Kalimpong I	Kalimpong	360.46	74,746	6.97	34.33	81.43	1
Kalimpong II (Lava and Pedong)	Algarah Bazar	241.26	66,830	2.93	37.07	79.68	-
Gorubathan	Gorubathan	442.72	60,663	6.64	23.60	76.88	-

== Education ==
Given in the table below (data in numbers) is a comprehensive picture of the education scenario in Kalimpong district, with data for the year 2012-13.

Subdivision	Primary School		Middle School		High School		Higher Secondary School		General College, Univ		Technical / Professional Instt		Non-formal Education	
Subdivision	Institution	Student	Institution	Student	Institution	Student	Institution	Student	Institution	Student	Institution	Student	Institution	Student
Kalimpong Subdivision	342	31,519	19	4,786	25	12,148	12	14,191	2	2,373	3	456	627	25,727

=== Educational institutions ===
The following institutions are located in Kalimpong subdivision:

- Kalimpong College, established in 1962 at Kalimpong, offers undergraduate courses in arts, science and commerce.
- Cluny Women's College, established in 1998 at Kalimpong, offers undergraduate courses in arts, computer applications and commerce.
- Government General Degree College, Pedong was established in 2015 at Pedong. It offers undergraduate courses in arts and science.
- Government General Degree College, Gorubathan was established in 2015 at Gorubathan. It offers undergraduate courses in arts and science.
- Rockvale Management College was established in 2012 at Kalimpong. Affiliated with the West Bengal University of Technology it offers courses in computer application, business administration and travel & tourism management.

== Healthcare ==
The table below (all data in numbers) presents an overview of the medical facilities available and patients treated in the hospitals, health centres and sub-centres in 2013 in Kalimpong district, with data for the year 2012-13.:

Subdivision	Health & Family Welfare Deptt, WB				Other State Govt Deptts	Local bodies	Central Govt Deptts / PSUs	NGO / Private Nursing Homes	Total	Total Number of Beds	Total Number of Doctors*	Indoor Patients	Outdoor Patients
Subdivision	Hospitals	Rural Hospitals	Block Primary Health Centres	Primary Health Centres	Other State Govt Deptts	Local bodies	Central Govt Deptts / PSUs	NGO / Private Nursing Homes	Total	Total Number of Beds	Total Number of Doctors*	Indoor Patients	Outdoor Patients
Kalimpong subdivision	3	2	1	6	-	-	-	4	16	579	33	18,580	164,693

.* Excluding nursing homes.

=== Medical facilities ===
Medical facilities in Kalimpong subdivision are as follows:

Hospitals: (Name, location, beds)

- Kalimpong Subdivisional Hospital, Kalimpong M, 370 beds
- Medicinal Plantation Hospital, Rango, 11 beds
- Mansong Cinchona Plantation Hospital, Mansong, 16 beds

Rural Hospitals: (Name, CD block, location, beds)

- Rambi Rural Hospital, Kalimpong I CD block, Rambi Bazar, PO Reang, 30 beds
- Pedong Rural Hospital, Kalimpong II CD block, Pedong, 30 beds

Block Primary Health Centres: (Name, CD block, location, beds)

- Gorubathan Block Primary Health Centre, Gorubathan CD block, Gorubathan, PO Fagu, 25 beds

Primary Health Centres : (CD block-wise)(CD block, PHC location, beds)

- Kalimpong I CD block: Samthar Samalbong (Samthar) (6), Teesta Bazaar (10)
- Kalimpong II CD block: Gitdubling (6), Algarah (2)
- Gorubathan CD block: Jaldhaka (2), Shirpagaon (2)

== Legislative segments ==
As per order of the Delimitation Commission in respect of the delimitation of constituencies in the West Bengal, the whole are under the subdivision, viz. the Kalimpong municipality and the three blocks of Kalimpong–I, Kalimpong–II and Gorubathan together constituted the Kalimpong assembly constituency of West Bengal. This constituency was part of Darjeeling Lok Sabha constituency.

== Bibliography ==
- Roy, D. C., ed. (20 November 1895), Survey and Settlement of the Western Duarsl in the District of Jalpaiguri 1889-1895, D. H. E. Sunder, Siliguri: N. L. Publishers – via archive.org
