= Dungra, Kalimpong =

Dungra Dungra Khasmahal
- Census Town
- Location in West Bengal, India Dungra (India)
- Coordinates: 27.0702°N 88.4864°E
- Country: India
- State: West Bengal
- District: Kalimpong

Area
  - Total: 3.0867 km^{2} (1.1918 sq mi)

Population (2011)
  - Total: 6,789
  - Density: 2,199/km^{2} (5,697/sq mi)
- Time zone: UTC+5:30 (IST)
- PIN: 734301
- Vehicle registration: WB
- Lok Sabha constituency: Darjeeling
- Vidhan Sabha constituency: Kalimpong
- Website: kalimpongdistrict.in

Dungra (also referred to as Dungra Khasmahal) is a census town in the Kalimpong I CD block in the Kalimpong Sadar subdivision of the Kalimpong district in the state of West Bengal, India.

== Geography ==
Places in the Kalimpong Sadar subdivision in Kalimpong district
CT: census town, R: rural/ urban centre, M: municipality, F: facility, NP: national park
Abbreviations used in names – TG for Tea Garden (town/village)
Owing to space constraints in the small map, the actual locations in a larger map may vary slightly

=== Location ===
Dungra is located at 27.0702°N 88.4864°E.

=== Area overview ===
The map alongside shows the Kalimpong Sadar subdivision of Kalimpong district. Physiographically, this area forms the Kalimpong Range, with the average elevation varying from 300 to 3,000 metres (980 to 9,840 ft). This region is characterized by abruptly rising hills and numerous small streams. It is an overwhelmingly rural area with 77.67% of the population living in rural areas and only 22.23% living in the urban areas. While Kalimpong is the only municipality, Dungra is the sole census town in the entire area. The economy is agro-based and there are 6 tea gardens in the Gorubathan CD block. In 2011, Kalimpong subdivision had a literacy rate of 81.85%, comparable with the highest levels of literacy in the districts of the state. While the first degree college in the subdivision was established at Kalimpong in 1962 the entire subdivision (and now the entire district), other than the head-quarters, had to wait till as late as 2015 (more than half a century) to have their first degree colleges at Pedong and Gorubathan.

Note: The map alongside presents some of the notable locations in the subdivision. All places marked in the map are linked in the larger full screen map.

== Demographics ==
According to the 2011 Census of India, Dungra Khamahal had a total population of 6,789 of which 3,276 (48%) were males and 3,513 (48%) were females. There were 546 persons in the age range of 0 to 6 years. The total number of literate people in Dungra Khasmahal was 5,444 (87.20% of the population over 6 years).

== Infrastructure ==
According to the District Census Handbook 2011, Darjiling, Dungra Khasmahal covered an area of 3.0867 km^{2}. Among the civic amenities, it had 5 km of roads with open drains, the protected water supply involved overhead tank, spring and tap water from untreated sources. It had 1,370 domestic electric connections. Among the educational facilities it had were 6 primary schools, 1 middle school, 1 secondary school, the nearest senior secondary school at Kalimpong 1 km away. It had 3 recognised shorthand type writing and vocational training institutions and 1 special school for the disabled. Among the social, cultural and recreational facilities, it had 1 auditorium/ community hall and 1 public library.
