= Gorubathan =

- Village
- Location in West Bengal, India
- Coordinates: 26.97°N 88.70°E
- Country: India
- State: West Bengal
- District: Kalimpong
- Elevation: 417 m (1,368 ft)

Population (2011)
  - Total: 5,291

Languages
  - Official: Bengali and Nepali
  - Additional official: English
- Time zone: UTC+5:30 (IST)
- Postal code: 735231
- Lok Sabha constituency: Darjeeling
- Vidhan Sabha constituency: Kalimpong
- Website: kalimpongdistrict.in

Gorubathan is a village in the Gorubathan CD block in the Kalimpong Sadar subdivision of the Kalimpong district in the Indian state of West Bengal.

== History ==
Gorubathan was once ruled by Lepcha kings who built Dalim Fort on top of a hill at Dalim Busty. Lepcha king Gaeboo Achyok defeated the King of Bhutan when the Bhutanese had invaded Gorubathan and signed a treaty in that fort, making it a place of significance for the Lepcha tribe. In 2008, Govt of West Bengal announced the place as a heritage site. How the nomenclature ‘Gorubathan’ was started is still controversial but due to vast grazing land and rearing of huge cattle in the open plain land of this area in earlier time must have started calling the place as Gorubathan (herds of cattle/Goru means- Ox, Bathan means -Herd) in Nepali language by the local people.

Some say that this place must have been dominated by the Gurus (priests) with their deity and supernatural powers in earlier times and subsequently started calling Gorubathan. It is also said that the cowboys from Bhutan used to supply Ox (Goru) in bulk meant for Kalimpong Hat Bazar from Bhutan. They used to stay on the bank of Chel river of present Sombarey Bazar for a day. Those Ox used to graze in the vast grazing areas of Upper Fagu and its adjoining areas. this is how the name of the place Gorubathan (herd of Ox) came into existence.

== Geography ==
Places in the Kalimpong Sadar subdivision in Kalimpong district
CT: census town, R: rural/ urban centre, M: municipality, F: facility, NP: national park
Abbreviations used in names – TG for Tea Garden (town/village)
Owing to space constraints in the small map, the actual locations in a larger map may vary slightly

=== Location ===
Gorubathan is located at 26.97°N 88.70°E. It has an average elevation of 417 metres (1,368 feet). It is surrounded by dense forest viz. Neora Valley National Park. The climate is moderate and it is neither too hot in the summer and nor too cold in the winter season.

Gorubathan is demarcated by river Jaldhaka with neighbouring country Bhutan in the eastern side, Sikkim State in the northern side with dense forest of Rachela Range, Kalimpong Block I & II in the western side and the vast plain areas of Jalpaiguri District in the southern sector.

=== Area overview ===
The map alongside shows the Kalimpong Sadar subdivision of Kalimpong district. Physiographically, this area forms the Kalimpong Range, with the average elevation varying from 300 to 3,000 metres (980 to 9,840 ft). This region is characterised by abruptly rising hills and numerous small streams. It is a predominantly rural area with 77.67% of the population living in rural areas and only 22.23% living in the urban areas. While Kalimpong is the only municipality, Dungra is the sole census town in the entire area. The economy is agro-based and there are 6 tea gardens in the Gorubathan CD block. In 2011, Kalimpong subdivision had a literacy rate of 81.85%, comparable with the highest levels of literacy in the districts of the state. While the first degree college in the subdivision was established at Kalimpong in 1962 the entire subdivision (and now the entire district), other than the head-quarters, had to wait till as late as 2015 (more than half a century) to have their first degree colleges at Pedong and Gorubathan.

Note: The map alongside presents some of the notable locations in the subdivision. All places marked in the map are linked in the larger full screen map.

== Demographics ==
According to 2011 Indian Census, Gorubathan had a total population of 5,291, of which 2,669 were males and 2,622 were females. Population within the age group of 0 to 6 years was 512. The total number of literates in Gorubathan was 4,020, which constituted 76.0% of the population with male literacy of 79.4% and female literacy of 72.5%. The effective literacy rate of 7+ population of Gorubathan was 84.1%, of which male literacy rate was 88.3% and female literacy rate was 79.9%. The Scheduled Castes and Scheduled Tribes population was 366 and 1,264 respectively. Gorubathan had 1119 households in 2011.

== Administration ==
Gorubathan is a community development block in the Kalimpong district. Gorubathan block consists of 11 gram panchayats viz. Dalim, Gorubathan–I, Gorubathan–II, Patengodak, Todeytangta, Kumai, Pokhreybong, Samsing, Aahaley, Nim and Rongo. This block has two police stations: Gorubathan and Jaldhaka. The headquarters of this block is in Fagu. There is a court of Judicial Magistrate and Civil Judge in Gorubathan which has been functioning since 2005.

== Economy ==
Main income source of the people are crops like tea, areca nuts, black cardamom, brooms, ginger, and other fruits and vegetables.

== Landmark ==
=== Sombarey Bazar ===
Sombarey Bazar is one and only town of Gorubathan. It is situated on the east bank of the Chel river. Weekly market is organised on every Monday (Sombaar). A data of 'West Bengal Disaster Management plans' mentioned the establishment year of Sombarey Bazar as 1905.

== Transport ==
Gorubathan is 72 km from district Headquarter Kalimpong and 61 km from Siliguri. The nearest city is Malbazar which is just 16 km from the town. The nearest railway stations are Damdim railway station, New Mal Junction railway station and New Jalpaiguri Junction railway station located at a distance of 12 km, 15 km and 65 km respectively.

== Education ==
Government General Degree College, Gorubathan, was established in 2015. Affiliated with the University of North Bengal, it offers honours courses in Nepali, Bengali, Hindi, English, history, political science, botany and zoology, and general courses in arts and science.
