= Kalimpong district =

District in West Bengal, India

- District
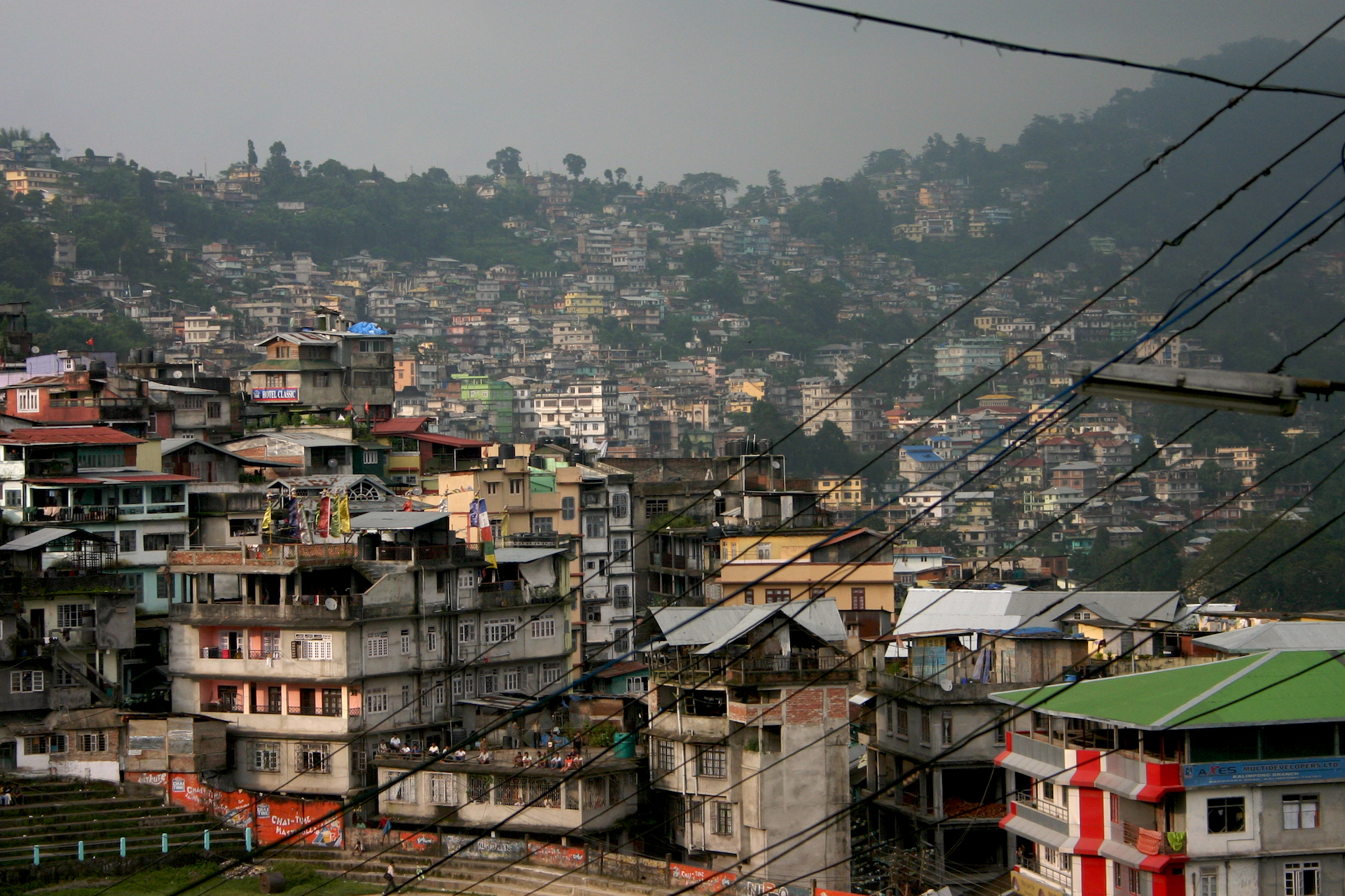
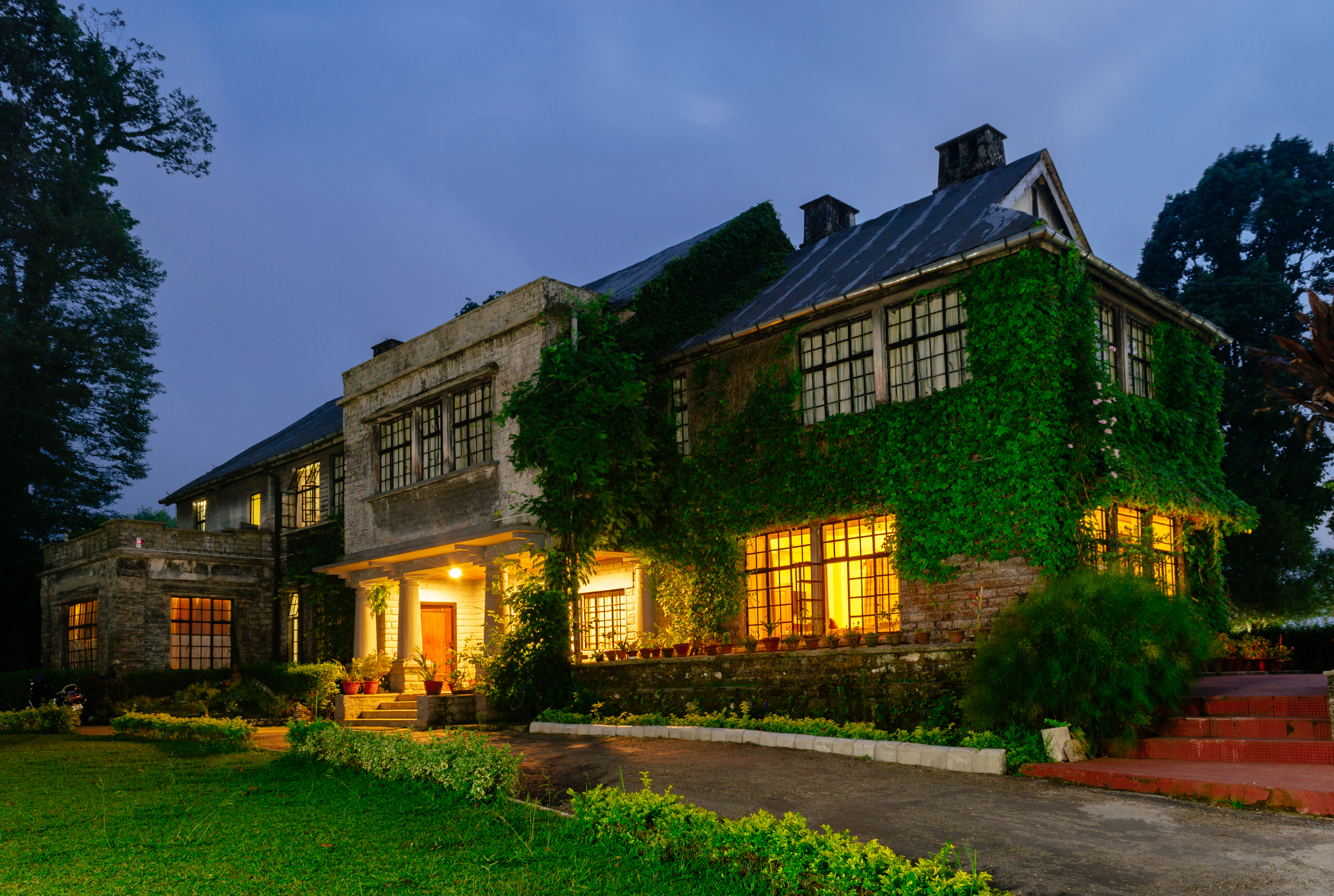
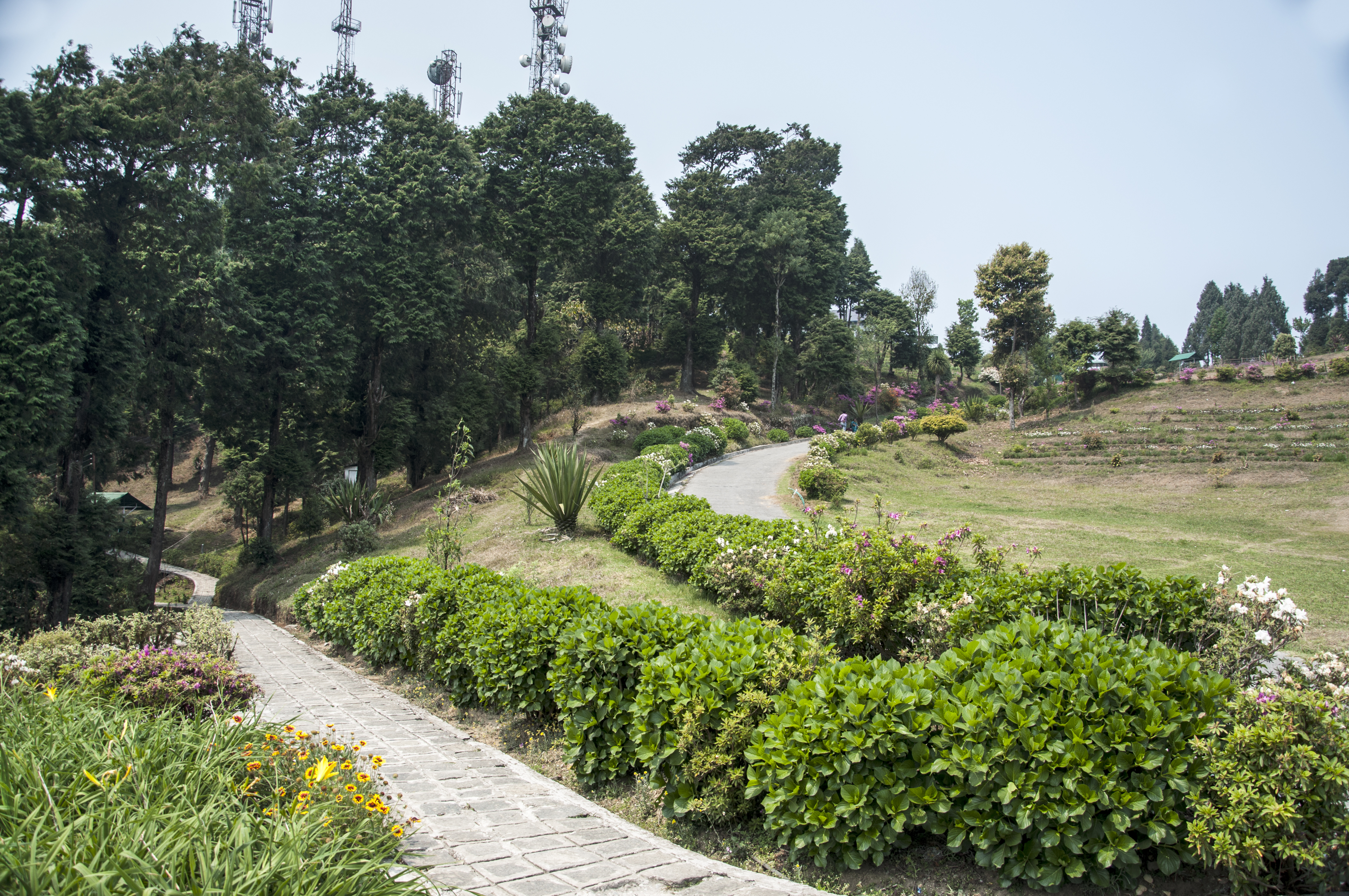
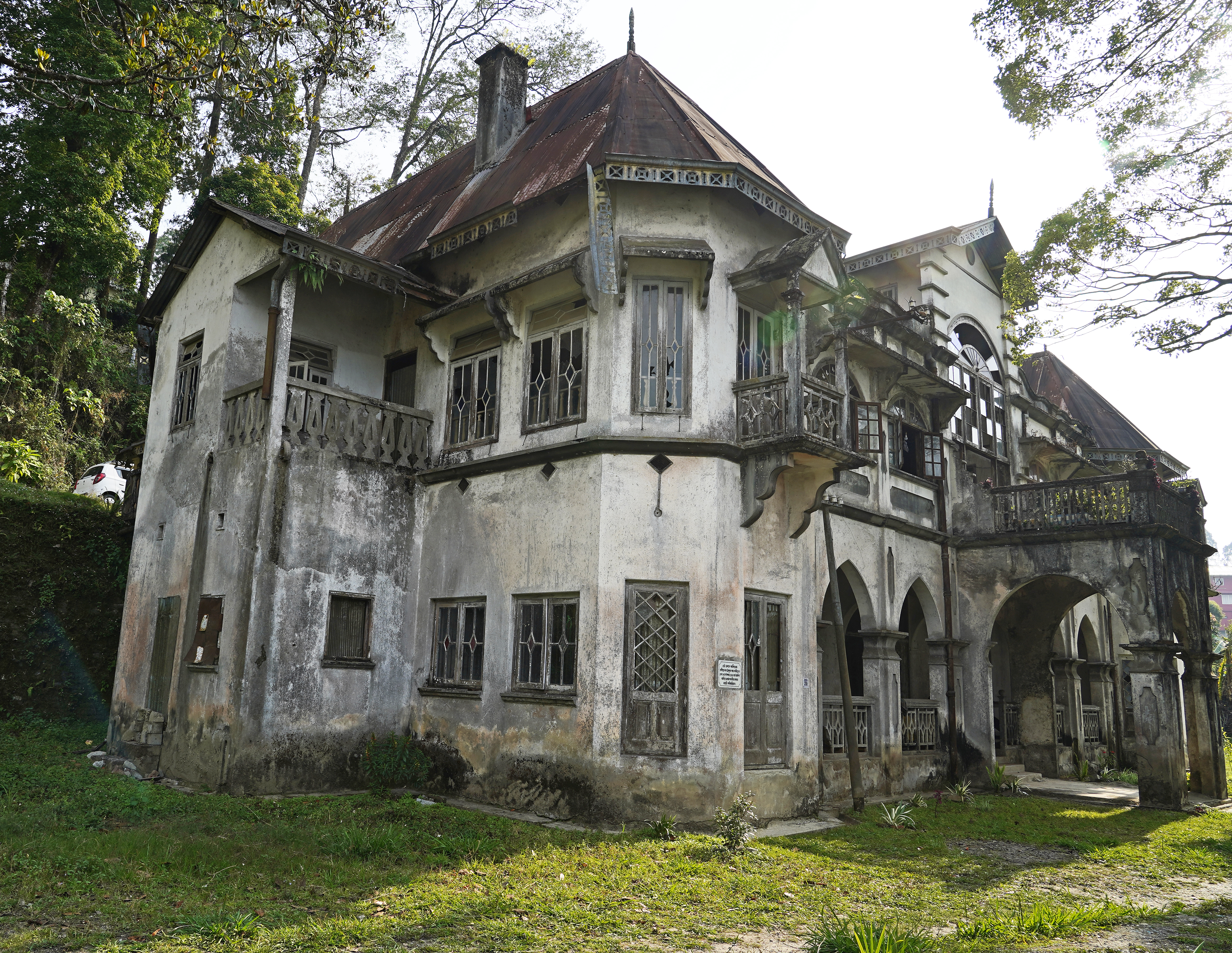
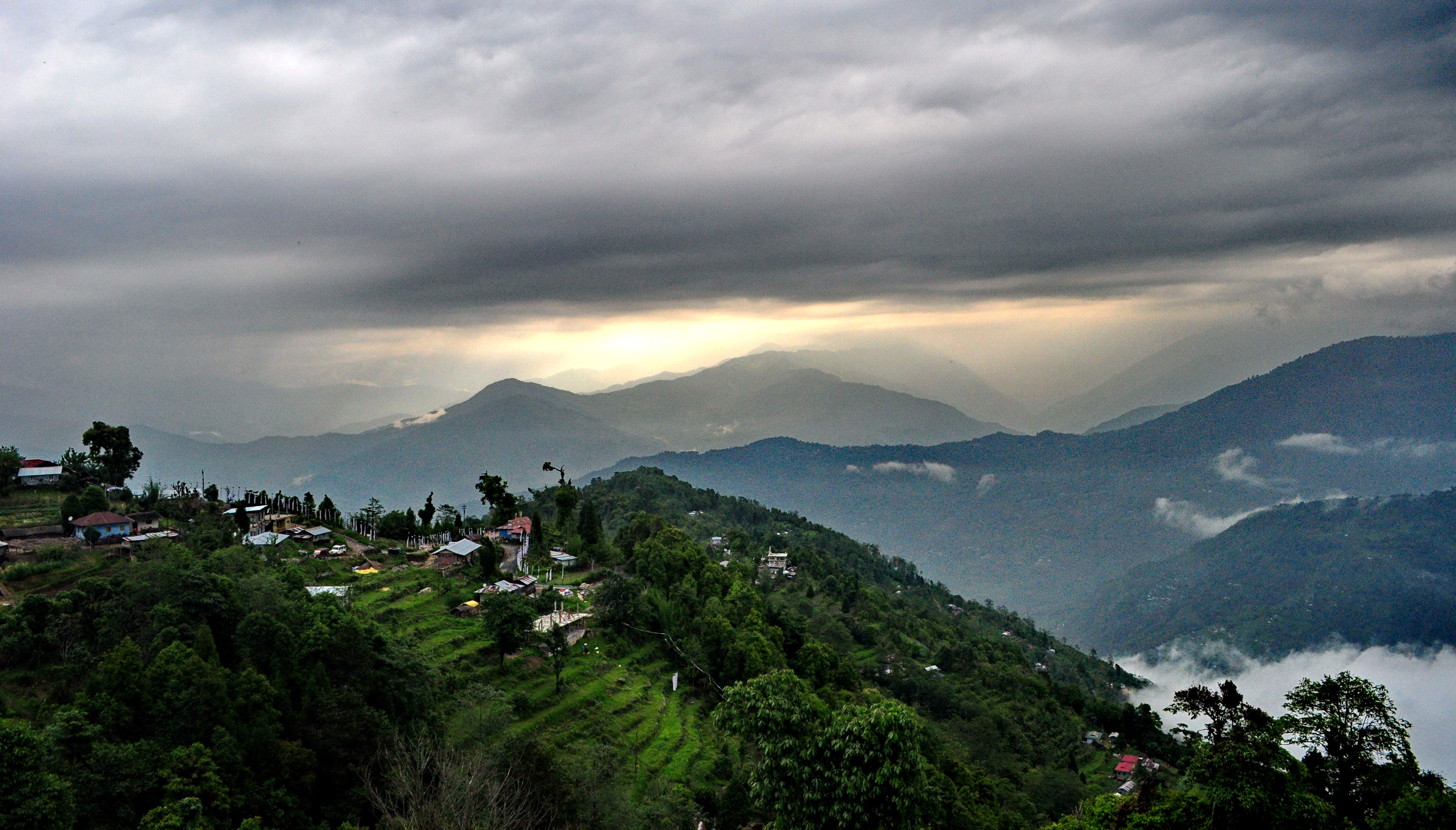
- Clockwise from top-left: View of Kalimpong, Morgan House in Kalimpong, Gouripur house, view from Rishyap, Neora Valley National Park
- Interactive map of Kalimpong district
- Coordinates: 27.06°N 88.47°E
- Country: India
- State: West Bengal
- Division: Jalpaiguri
- Headquarters: Kalimpong

Government
  - Subdivisions: Kalimpong Sadar
  - CD Blocks: Kalimpong I, Kalimpong II, Gorubathan
  - Lok Sabha constituencies: Darjeeling
  - Vidhan Sabha constituencies: Kalimpong

Area
  - Total: 1,044.60 km^{2} (403.32 sq mi)

Population (2011)
  - Total: 251,642
  - Density: 240.898/km^{2} (623.923/sq mi)

Demographics
  - Literacy: 78.57 per cent
  - Sex ratio: 949 ♂/♀

Languages
  - Official: Bengali, Nepali
  - Additional official: English
- Time zone: UTC+05:30 (IST)
- Website: kalimpong.gov.in

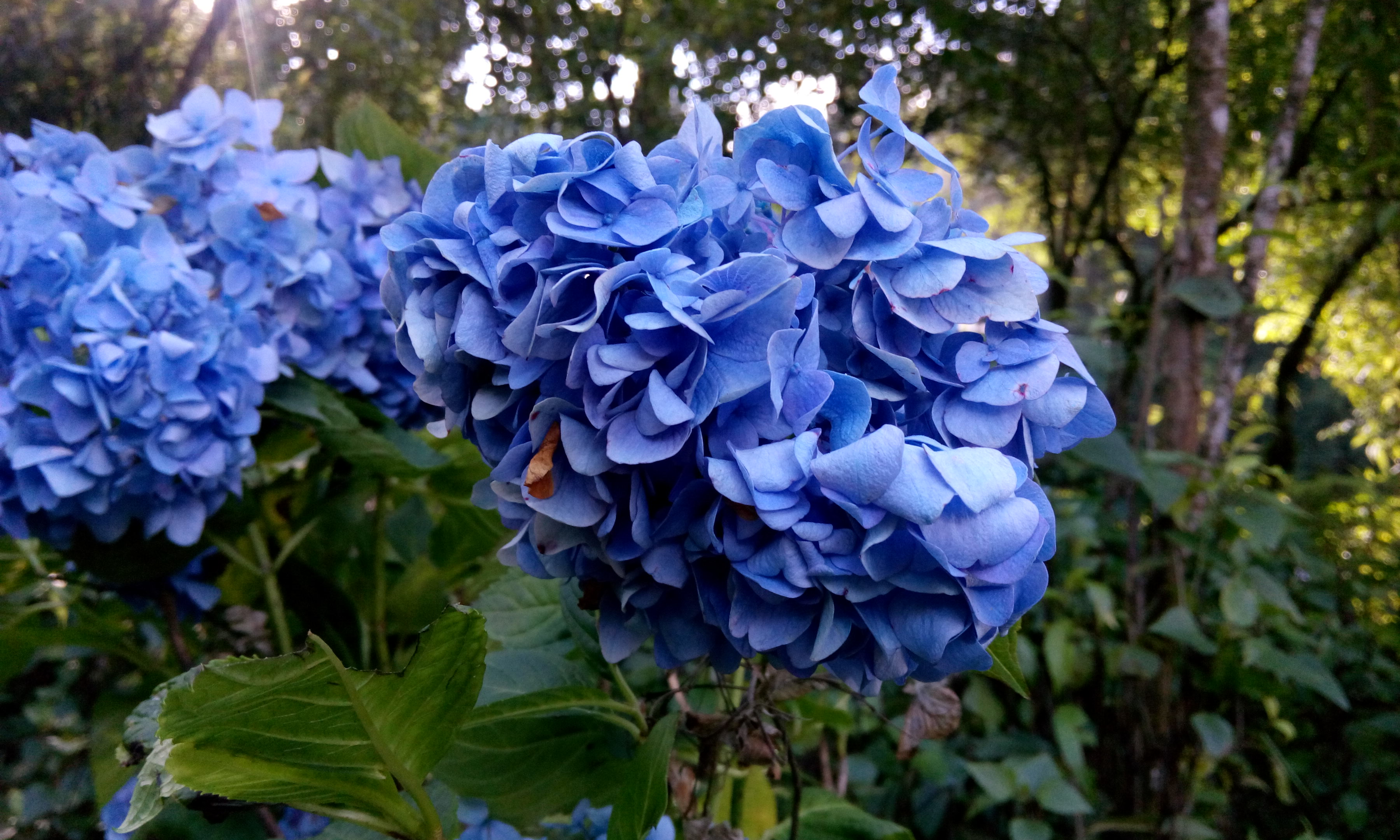
Blue orchids of Kalimpong

Kalimpong district is a district in the state of West Bengal, India. In 2017, it was carved out as a separate district to become the 21st district of West Bengal. The district is headquartered at Kalimpong, which grew to prominence as a market town for Indo-Tibetan trade during the British period. It is bounded by Pakyong district of Sikkim in the north, Bhutan in the east, Darjeeling district in the west, and Jalpaiguri district in the south.

The district consists of the Kalimpong municipality and four community development blocks: Kalimpong I, Kalimpong II, Gorubathan and Pedong. The towns and villages in Kalimpong District are: Kalimpong, Gorubathan, Melli Bazar, Teesta Bazar, Algarah, Labha, Samsing and Rambi.

== Etymology ==
The precise origin of the name Kalimpong remains unclear. There are many theories on the origin of the name. One widely accepted theory claims that the name "Kalimpong" means "Assembly (or Stockade) of the King's Ministers" in Tibetan, derived from kalon ("King's ministers") and pong ("stockade"). The name may be derived from the translation "ridge where we play" from Lepcha, as it was known to be the place for traditional tribal gatherings for summer sporting events. People from the hills call the area Kalempung ("the black spurs").

According to K.P. Tamsang, author of The Untold and Unknown Reality about the Lepchas, the term Kalimpong is deduced from the name Kalenpung, which in Lepcha means "Hillock of Assemblage"; in time, the name was distorted to Kalebung, and later further contorted to Kalimpong. Another possible derivation points to Kaulim, locally known as odal Scientific name Sterculia Villosa, a fibrous plant found in abundance in the region.

== History ==
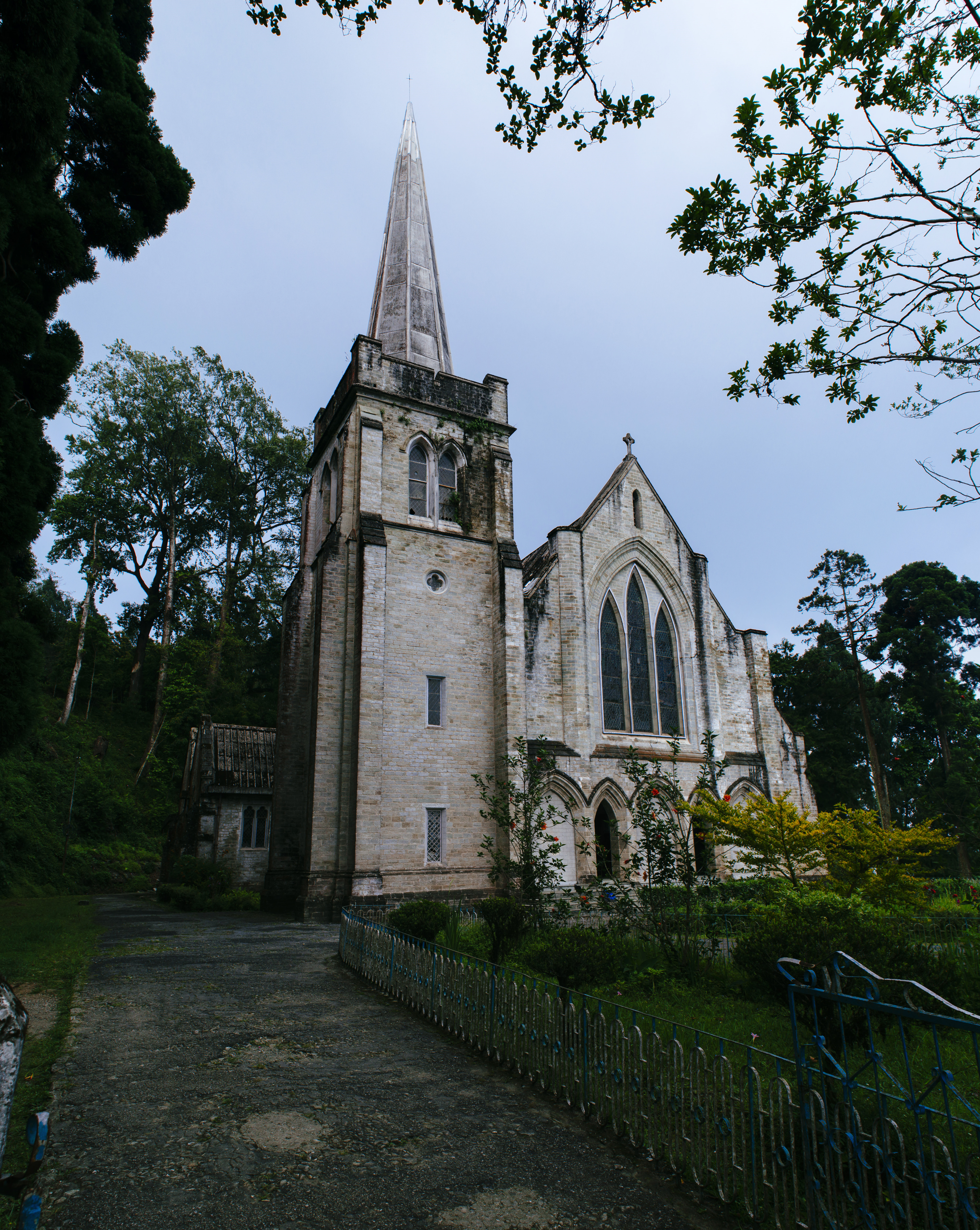
Katherine Graham Memorial Chapel, Dr. Graham's Homes established in 1925.

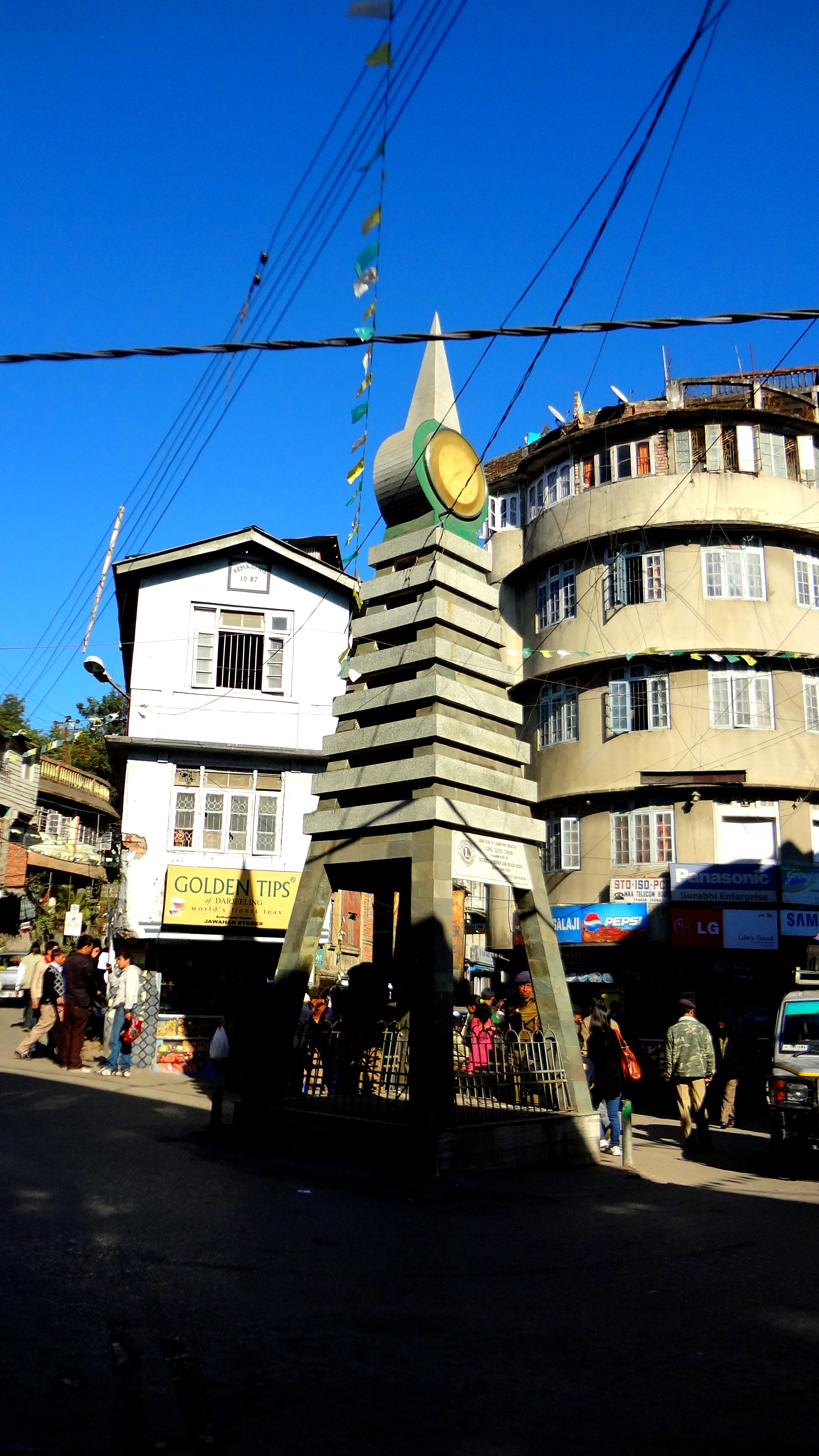
The Clock Tower of Kalimpong.

What is now Kalimpong district was originally Sikkimese territory. It was controlled through two hill forts in the region, at Damsang (Note: Alternative spellings include "Damsung", "Damsong", "Dumsong", "Dhumsong" etc.) and Daling (Note: Also called "Dalim". Variant spellings include "Dhalim" and "Dhaling".) (or Dalingkot, meaning "Daling fort"). The region itself seems to have been referred to as Dalingkot. In 1718, the Kingdom of Bhutan annexed this territory, and ruled it for the following 150 years. The area was sparsely populated by Lepchas, and migrant Bhutia, Limbu and Kirati tribes.

After the Anglo-Bhutan War in 1864, the Treaty of Sinchula (1865) was signed, in which certain "hill territory to east of the Teesta River" was ceded to British India. The precise territory was unspecified but included the fort of Dalingkot. In 1866–1867, British surveyors demarcated the area, and set the Di Chu and Ni Chu rivers as the eastern and northeastern boundaries.

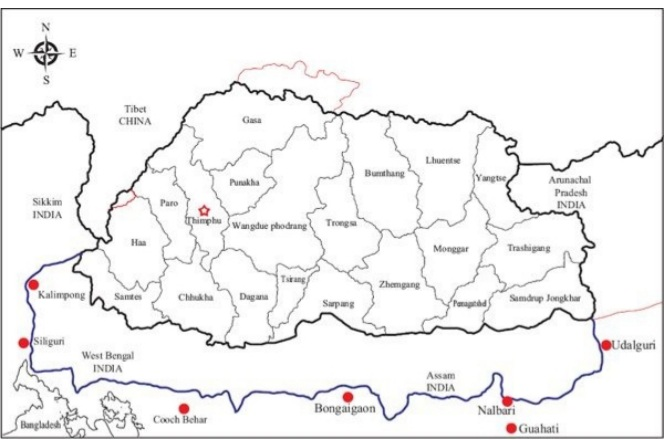
Southern Boundary of Bhutan before the 1865 Duar War

The ceded territory was added to the Western Duars district at first, and later transferred to the Darjeeling district of the Bengal province in 1866. It was referred to as the "tract of Dalingkot" or "tract of Damsang", after the hill forts through which it had been administered in the past. At that time, Kalimpong was a small hamlet, with only two or three families known to reside there. However the neighbourhood of Kalimpong was well-populated with several villages, as recorded by Ashley Eden during a mission to Bhutan in 1864. Eden mentioned that the people there were well-disposed to the British administration and had frequently traded with the Darjeeling area to the west of Teesta in defiance of the Bhutanese authorities.

The temperate climate prompted the British to develop the town as an alternative hill station to Darjeeling, to escape the scorching summer heat in the Indo-Gangetic Plain. Kalimpong's proximity to the Nathu La and Jelep La passes for trading with Tibet was an added advantage. It soon became an important trading outpost in the trade of furs, wools and food grains between India and Tibet. The increase in commerce attracted large numbers of Nepalis from neighbouring Nepal and also the lower regions of Sikkim where Nepalis had been residing since the Gorkha invasion of Sikkim in 1790. The movement of people into the area transformed Kalimpong from a small hamlet with a few houses, to a thriving town with economic prosperity. Britain assigned a plot within Kalimpong to the influential Bhutanese Dorji family, through which trade and relations with Bhutan flowed. This later became the Bhutan House, a Bhutanese administrative and cultural centre.

The arrival of Scottish missionaries saw the construction of schools and welfare centres for the British. Rev. W. Macfarlane in the early 1870s established the first schools in the area. The Scottish University Mission Institution was opened in 1886, followed by the Kalimpong Girls High School. In 1900, Reverend J.A. Graham founded the Dr. Graham's Homes for destitute Anglo-Indian students. The young missionary (and aspiring writer and poet) Aeneas Francon Williams, aged 24, arrived in Kalimpong in 1910 to take up the post of assistant schoolmaster at Dr. Graham's Homes, where he later became Bursar and remained working at the school for the next fourteen years. From 1907 onwards, most schools in Kalimpong had started offering education to Indian students. By 1911, the population comprised many ethnic groups, including Nepalis, Lepchas, Tibetans, Muslims, the Anglo-Indian communities. Hence by 1911, the population had swollen to 7,880.

Following Indian independence in 1947, Kalimpong remained in West Bengal, the part of Bengal allocated to India during the Paritiion. With China's annexation of Tibet in 1950, many Buddhist monks fled Tibet and established monasteries in Kalimpong. These monks brought rare Buddhist scriptures with them. In 1962, the permanent closure of Jelep La after the Sino-Indian War disrupted trade between Tibet and India, and led to a slowdown in Kalimpong's economy. In 1976, the visiting Dalai Lama consecrated the Zang Dhok Palri Phodang monastery, which houses many of the Tibetan Buddhist scriptures.

Most large houses in Kalimpong were built during the British era. In the background is Kangchenjunga.

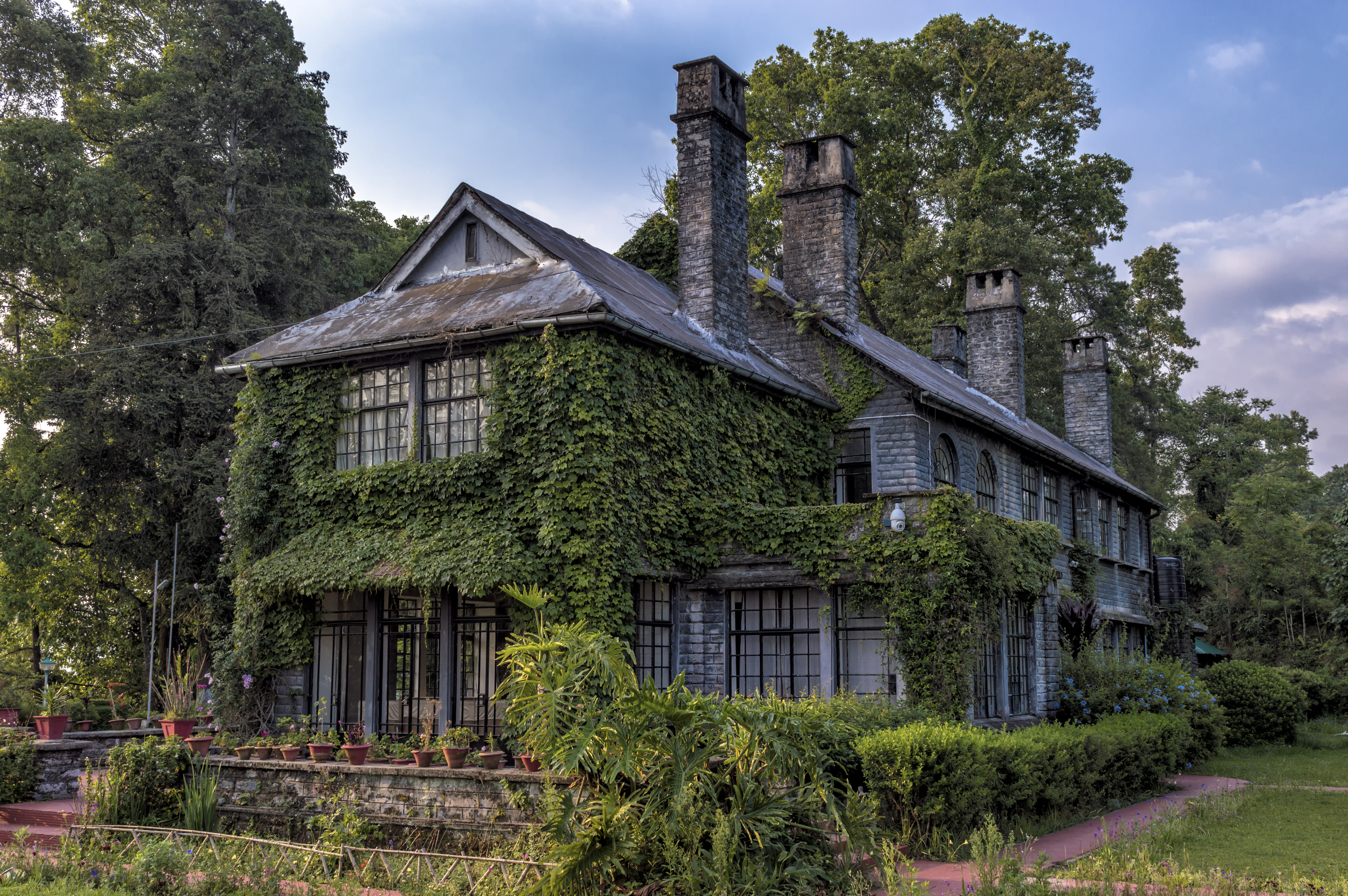
Morgan House is a classic example of colonial architecture in Kalimpong.

Between 1986 and 1988, the demand for a separate state of Gorkhaland and Kamtapur based on ethnic lines grew strong. Riots between the Gorkha National Liberation Front (GNLF) and the West Bengal government reached a stand-off after a forty-day strike. The town was virtually under siege, and the state government called in the Indian army to maintain law and order. This led to the formation of the Darjeeling Gorkha Hill Council, a body that was given semi-autonomous powers to govern the Darjeeling district, except the area under the Siliguri subdivision. Since 2007, the demand for a separate Gorkhaland state has been revived by the Gorkha Janmukti Morcha and its supporters in the Darjeeling hills. The Kamtapur People's Party and its supporters' movement for a separate Kamtapur state covering North Bengal have gained momentum.

== Geography ==
=== Geographical indication ===
Kalonunia rice was awarded the Geographical Indication (GI) status tag from the Geographical Indications Registry under the Union Government of India on 2 January 2024 (valid until 11 March 2034). It is a common and widely cultivated crop in districts of Cooch Behar, Jalpaiguri and Alipurduar along with some parts of Darjeeling & Kalimpong districts of West Bengal.

State Agricultural Management & Extension Training Institute (SAMETI) from Narendrapur, proposed the GI registration of Kalonunia rice. After filing the application in March 2021, the rice was granted the GI tag in 2024 by the Geographical Indication Registry in Chennai, making the name "Kalonunia rice" exclusive to the rice grown in the region. It thus became the third rice variety from West Bengal after Tulaipanji rice and the 26th type of goods from West Bengal to earn the GI tag.

The GI tag protects the rice from illegal selling and marketing, and gives it legal protection and a unique identity.

=== Flora and fauna ===
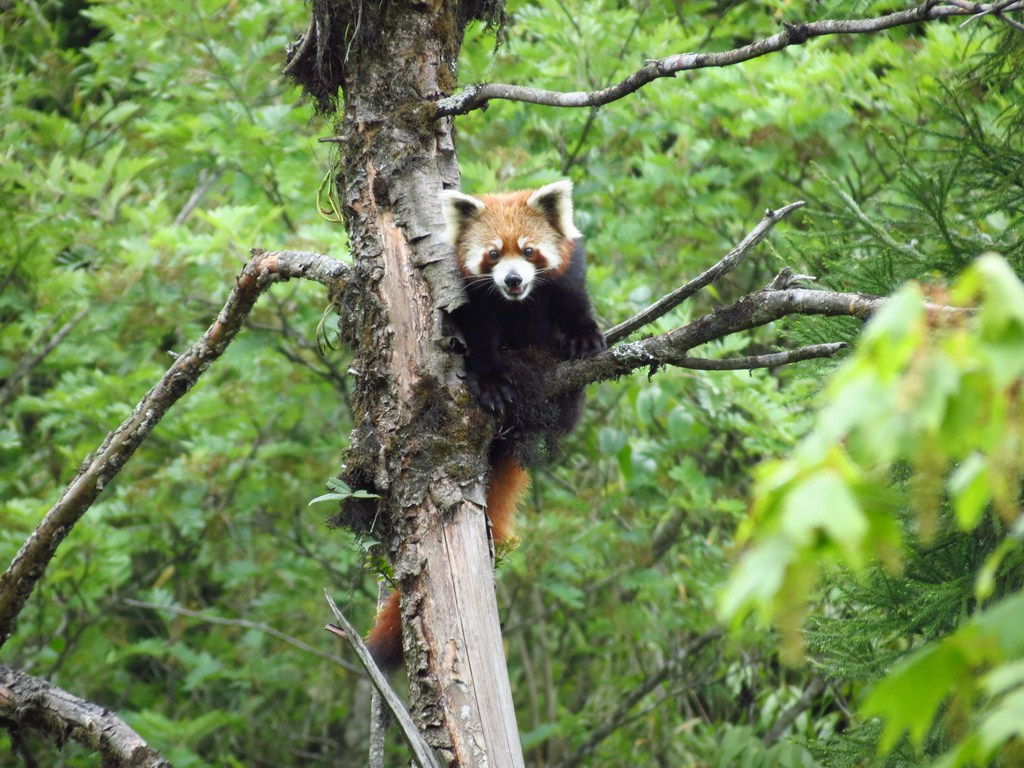
Red Panda at Neora Valley National Park

Kalimpong district is home to the Neora Valley National Park, which has an area of 159.89 km^{2} (61.73 mi^{2}). Mammals reported from this area are Indian leopard, five viverrid species, Asiatic black bear, sloth bear, Asian golden cat, wild boar, leopard cat, goral, serow, barking deer, sambar deer, flying squirrel, tahr, red panda and clouded leopard.

=== Rivers ===
The major rivers flowing through Kalimpong district are River Teesta, River Jaldhaka and River Rangpo. Other rivers are Relli Khola, Riyang Khola, Murti Khola, Reshi Khola, Chel Khola, River Ghish, Bindu Khola, Les Khola, Neora Khola etc.

== Demographics ==
According to the 2011 census, Kalimpong district (enumerated as Kalimpong subdivision then) has a population of 251,642. Kalimpong I block had a population of 74,746; Kalimpong II block had a population of 66,830; Gorubathan block had a population of 60,663; and Kalimpong Municipality had a population of 49,403. Kalimpong district has a sex ratio of 959 females per 1000 males. 56,192 (22.33%) live in urban areas. Scheduled Castes and Scheduled Tribes made up 16,433 (6.53%) and 74,976 (29.79%) of the population respectively.

=== Religion ===
Religion in Kalimpong district (2011)
Hinduism	60.94%
Buddhism	20.94%
Christianity	14.88%
Islam	1.59%
Traditional religion	1.29%
Other or not stated	0.36%

Religion in present-day Kalimpong district
Religion	1941		2011	
Religion	Pop.	%	Pop.	%
Hinduism	35,928	45.45%	153,355	60.94%
Tribal religion	31,674	40.07%	3,243	1.29%
Christianity	714	0.9%	37,453	14.88%
Islam	324	0.41%	3,998	1.59%
Buddhism	---	---	52,688	20.94%
Others (Note: Including Jainism, Buddhism, Zoroastrianism, Judaism, Ad-Dharmis, or not stated)	10,402	13.16%	905	0.36%
Total Population	79,042	100%	251,642	100%

According to the 2011 census, Hindus numbered 153,355 (60.94%), Buddhists numbered 52,688 (20.94%), Christians numbered 37,453 (14.88%). Muslims numbered 3,998 (1.59%) of the population, while traditional faiths (such as Kirat Mundhum) were 3,243 (1.29%).

=== Languages ===
Languages of Kalimpong district (2011)
1. Nepali (87.6%)
2. Hindi (3.18%)
3. Lepcha (2.67%)
4. Bhojpuri (1.16%)
5. Others (5.38%)

At the time of the 1951 census, only 24% of those now living in Kalimpong district spoke Nepali as their mother tongue. Most of the population spoke a variety of other languages such as Rai, Limbu, Lepcha and Tamang, although nearly all could speak Nepali as a second language. By 1961, the proportion of people in Kalimpong returning Nepali as their mother tongue had jumped to 75%. This was accompanied by a dramatic fall in the numbers of other languages spoken by the variety of ethnic groups in the hills.

However at the time of the 2011 census, 87.61% of the population spoke Nepali, 3.18% Hindi, 2.67% Lepcha, 1.16% Bhojpuri and 5.38% Others languages as their first language.

== Government and politics ==
=== Area ===
Apart from the Kalimpong municipality that consists of 23 wards, the district contains rural areas of 42 gram panchayats under four community development blocks: Kalimpong I, Kalimpong II, Gorubathan and Pedong.

Kalimpong district has an area of 1,053.60 km^{2} (406.80 mi^{2}), with Kalimpong I block having an area of 360.46 km^{2} (139.17 mi^{2}); Kalimpong II block an area of 241.26 km^{2} (93.15 mi^{2}); Gorubathan block an area of 442.72 km^{2} (170.94 mi^{2}); and Kalimpong Municipality an area of 9.16 km^{2} (3.54 mi^{2}).

=== Blocks ===
==== Kalimpong I block ====
The Kalimpong I block consists of 18 gram panchayats; Bong, Kalimpong, Samalbong, Tista, Dr. Graham's Homes, Lower Echhay, Samthar, Neembong, Dungra, Upper Echhay, Seokbir, Bhalukhop, Yangmakum, Pabringtar, Sindebong, Kafer Kanke Bong, Pudung and Tashiding. This block has one police station at Kalimpong. The block is headquartered in Kalimpong.

==== Kalimpong II block ====
The Kalimpong II block consists of 7 gram panchayats, namely Dalapchand, Gitdabling, Lava-Gitabeong, Lolay, Payong, Shangse, and Shantuk. This block is served by Kalimpong police station. The block is headquartered in Algarah.

==== Gorubathan block ====
The Gorubathan block consists of 11 gram panchayats, namely Dalim, Gorubathan–I, Gorubathan–II, Patengodak, Todey Tangta, Kumai, Pokhreybong, Samsing, Aahaley, Nim and Rongo. This block has two police stations: Gorubathan and Jaldhaka. The block is headquartered in Fagu.

==== Pedong block ====
The Pedong block consists of 6 gram panchayats, namely Kage, Kashyong, Lingsey, Lingseykha, Pedong and Syakiyong. This block is served by Kalimpong police station. The block is headquartered in Pedong.

=== Legislative segments ===
As per order of the Delimitation Commission in respect of the delimitation of constituencies in West Bengal, the whole area under the district of Kalimpong (formerly Kalimpong subdivision), namely the Kalimpong municipality and the three blocks of Kalimpong–I, Kalimpong–II and Gorubathan together constitutes the Kalimpong Assembly constituency of West Bengal. This constituency is part of Darjeeling Lok Sabha constituency. Darjeeling is represented by Neeraj Zimba of the Bharatiya Janata Party, while Kalimpong Assembly constituency is represented by Bharat Chettri also from the Bharatiya Janata Party.

No.	Name	Lok Sabha	MLA	2026 Winner	2024 Lead
22	Kalimpong	Darjeeling	Bharat Chettri	Bharatiya Janata Party	Bharatiya Janata Party

== Transport ==
=== Roadways ===
National Highways

- National Highway 10 connecting Siliguri to Gangtok, lies in Kalimpong District from Kalijhora to Atal Setu Bridge, Rangpo via Teesta Bazaar, Rambi Bazar and Melli.
- National Highway-717A Connecting Bagrakote to Gangtok lies in Kalimpong district from Bagrakote to Resi Sikkim border, via Chuikhim, Nimbong, Loleygaon, Lava, Algarah, Pedong, and Kataray Bazar.
- National Highway 17 connecting Sevoke to Guwahati lies in Kalimpong district at Coronation Bridge – Mongpong area.

=== Railway ===
The currently functioning nearest railway station from Kalimpong district is Sivok railway station of Darjeeling district and Bagrakote Railway Station of Jalpaiguri district. The nearest major railway stations are Malbazar Junction, Siliguri Junction and New Jalpaiguri railway station.

The under construction Sevoke – Rangpo railway line, and Matelli – Naxal railway line lies in Kalimpong district, the following are the under construction railway stations under Kalimpong district:

- Melli Railway Station
- Riyang Railway Station
- Tista Bazaar Railway Station
- Naxal railway station

=== Airways ===
Bagdogra Airport is the nearest airport from southern parts of Kalimpong district, and Pakyong Airport is the nearest airport from northern areas of Kalimpong district.

== Bibliography ==
- Rennie, Surgeon (1866), Bhotan and the Dooar War, John Murray – via archive.org
- Roy, D. C., ed. (1895), Survey and Settlement of the Western Duarsl in the District of Jalpaiguri 1889–1895, D. H. E. Sunder, Siliguri: N. L. Publishers – via archive.org
- Samanta, Amiya K. (2000). Gorkhaland Movement: A Study in Ethnic Separatism. APH Publishing. ISBN 978-81-7648-166-3.
