= 2023 Sikkim flash floods =

Natural disaster in Northeast India

- The state of Sikkim within India
- Date: 4–5 October 2023
- Location: Sikkim districts; Mangan, Gangtok, Pakyong, and Namchi; West Bengal districts; Cooch Behar, Jalpaiguri, Darjeeling, and Kalimpong
- Cause: Outburst of the South Lhonak lake due to heavy rainfall
- Deaths: 92+
- Property damage: 15 bridges, one hydroelectric dam destroyed

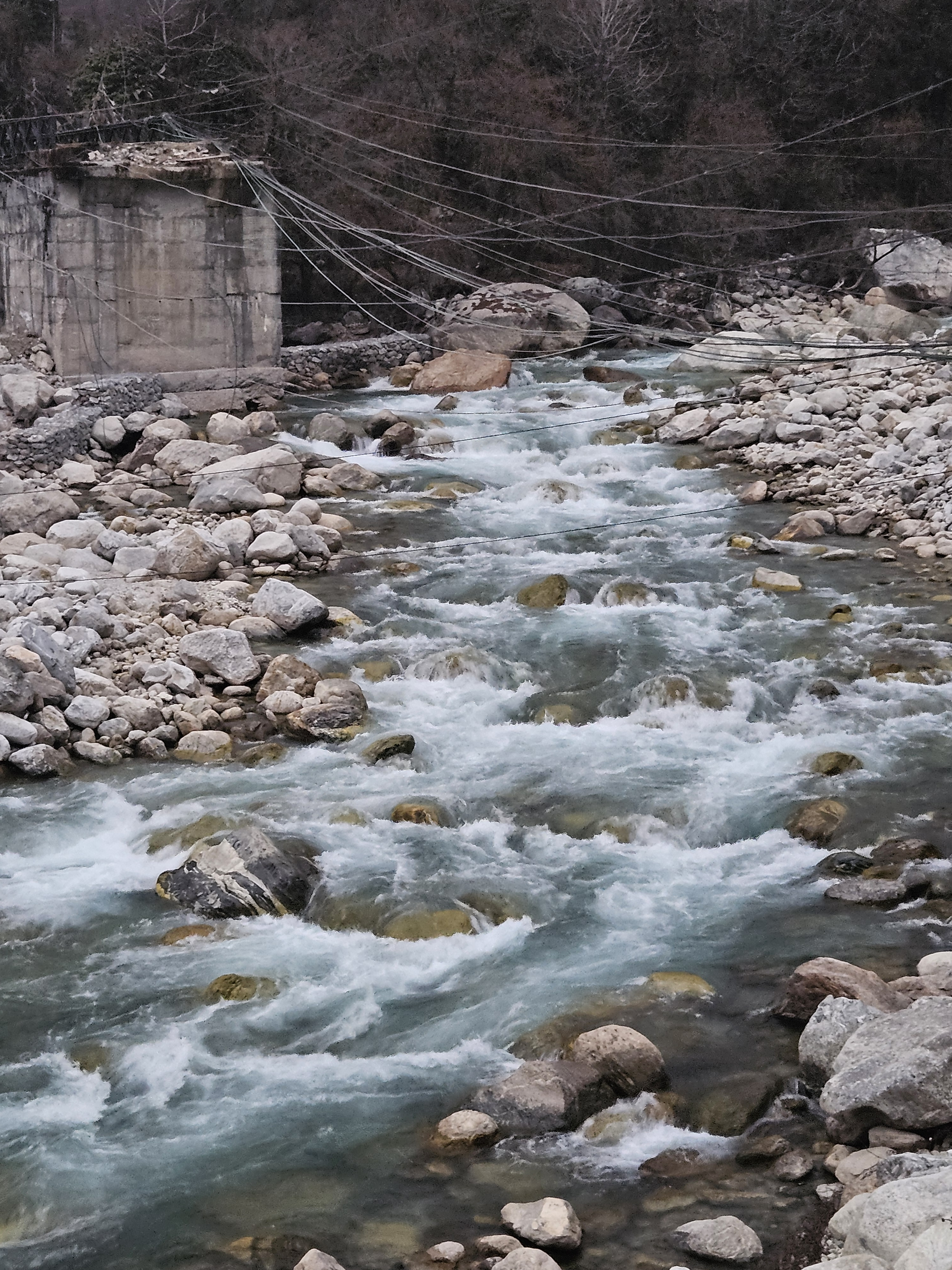
A concrete bridge was washed out due to Glacial Lake Outburst Floods (GLOF) 2023 at Dikchu, Mangan, Sikkim.

On 4 October 2023, heavy rains caused the glacial South Lhonak lake in Sikkim, a state in northeastern India, to breach its banks, causing a glacial lake outburst flood. The flood reached the Teesta III Dam at Chungthang at midnight, before its gates could be opened, destroying the dam in minutes. Water levels downstream in the River Teesta rose by up to 20 feet (6.1 m), causing widespread damage.

It was the deadliest flood in the area after the 1968 Sikkim floods when around 1000 people were killed.

== Background ==
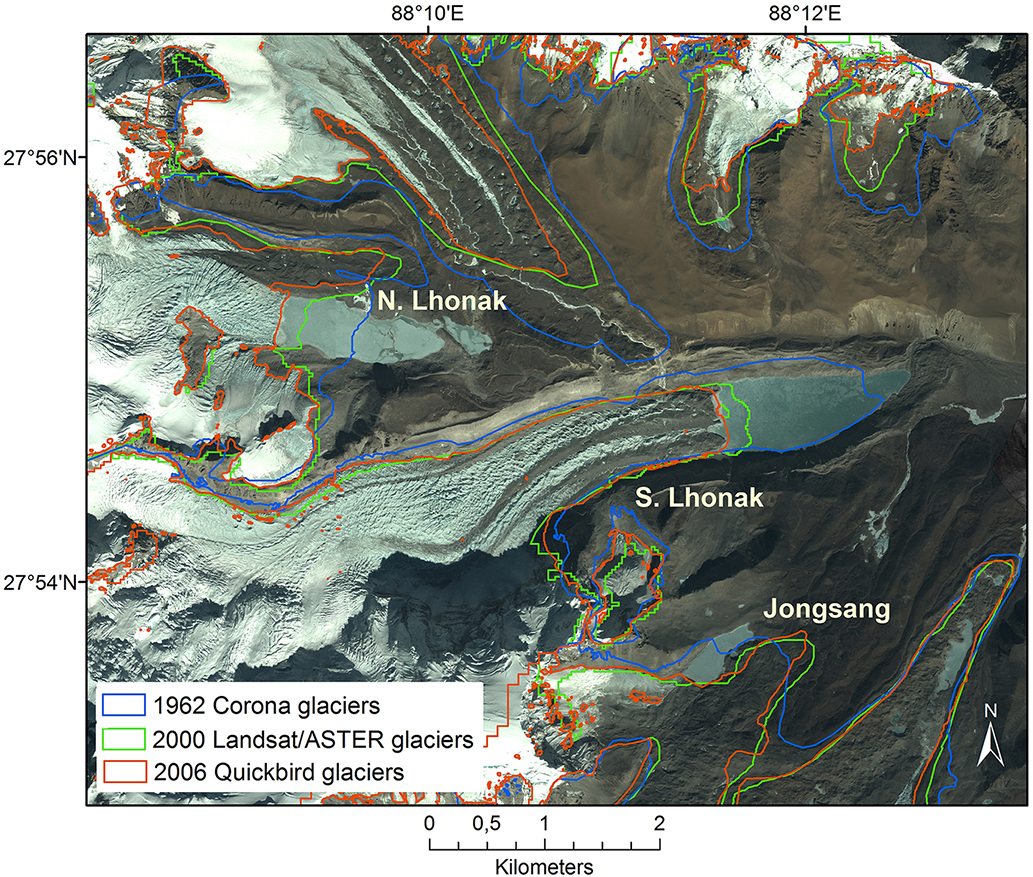
Satellite image from 2006 showing the expansion of the lake over four decades

The South Lhonak Lake is a moraine-dammed lake fed by the meltwater of the Lhonak glacier. It was first seen in CORONA satellite images from 1962 as a supraglacial lake. Landsat MSS images show that it became a separate lake by 1977, with a surface area of 17 hectares (42 acres). In four decades, as the glacier retreated 1.9 kilometres (1.2 mi), the lake swelled in size, covering nearly 100 hectares (247 acres) by 2008. It was identified as potentially at risk of causing glacial outburst floods, and in 2018 pipelines were carried up by yak and installed to pump water out of it. Sentinel-1A images from 28 September 2023 showed the lake covering an area of 167.4 hectares (414 acres).

Before the flood, scientists and authorities were working on installing an early warning system for glacial floods from the lake.

== The flood ==
In early October 2023, a cloudburst caused Sikkim to receive more than double its normal rainfall; between 3 and 4 October alone, the state received five times the usual precipitation. The South Lhonak burst its shores, causing a flash flood. Satellite images from the Indian Space Research Organisation's RISAT-1A show that the lake's surface area shrunk by more than 100 hectares (247 acres). Based on a warning from the Indo-Tibetan Border Police at midnight, the operators of the Teesta III Dam at Chungthang rushed to open the dam's gates, but were too late; the flood quickly destroyed the dam, as well as the bridge to its 1200-MW hydroelectric powerhouse, which was submerged.

Water levels downstream in the River Teesta subsequently rose by 15 to 20 feet (4.6 to 6.1 m), flooding many areas in Mangan, Gangtok, Pakyong, and Namchi districts in Sikkim, and Kalimpong, Cooch Behar, Jalpaiguri and Darjeeling districts in West Bengal. The flood also went onwards to Bangladesh, where it affected hundreds of villages along the Teesta River and Char areas.

Fifteen bridges across the state were washed away, and the north of the state, including the capital Gangtok, was cut off from the rest of India as parts of National Highway 10 collapsed. Three thousand tourists were stranded across the state. Towns and cities like Chungthang, Dikchu, Singtam, Rangpo, Melli, and Teesta Bazaar were very heavily damaged.

== Relief operations ==
The government of Sikkim declared the flood a disaster, and the Indian central government released ₹48 crore ($5.76 million) in disaster relief funds. (Note: Based on an exchange rate of 1 USD = 83.26 INR as of 6 October 2023) Additionally, the state government announced an ex-gratia compensation of ₹4 lakh ($4804) to the families of those who died, as well as an immediate payment of ₹2,000 ($24) to those in relief camps. The National Disaster Response Force and the Indian Army are involved in the ongoing relief operations. Two thousand four hundred people were evacuated from flood-hit areas, and 7,600 others were in relief camps. Ten thousand more were evacuated in West Bengal.

Fourteen people were believed to be trapped inside the tunnels of the destroyed Teesta III Dam; a 60-strong team of the National Disaster Response Force — including scuba divers — was assembled to rescue them.

== Aftermath ==
As of 2025, long patches of the roads across north Sikkim that were flooded are still muddy, unpaved and full of rubble, and several bridges damaged during the floods are yet to be rebuilt. The Lepchas of the area are protesting against the reconstruction of the Teesta III dam.

== Casualties ==
At least 55 people were killed, while 75 were reported missing as of 6 October. By 18 October, 92 were confirmed dead, with more bodies being retrieved. Among the missing were 23 Indian Army personnel, of whom seven were subsequently found dead and one rescued alive. One of the dead soldiers was found floating in the Teesta in Nilphamari, Bangladesh; the Border Guard Bangladesh handed over the body to the Indian officials through a flag meeting. One child was killed and six injured in the neighbouring state of West Bengal when a mortar shell carried downstream from Sikkim exploded after being picked up by locals.
