= Bhalukhop =

Bhalukhop Bhalukhop Khasmahal
- Village
- Location in West Bengal, India Bhalukhop (India)
- Coordinates: 27.0872°N 88.4814°E
- Country: India
- State: West Bengal
- District: Kalimpong

Population (2011)
  - Total: 5,254
- Time zone: UTC+5:30 (IST)
- Vehicle registration: WB
- Lok Sabha constituency: Darjeeling
- Vidhan Sabha constituency: Kalimpong
- Website: kalimpong.gov.in

Bhalukhop (also referred to as Bhalukhop Khasmahal) is a village in the Kalimpong I CD block in the Kalimpong Sadar subdivision of the Kalimpong district in the state of West Bengal, India.

== Geography ==
Places in the Kalimpong Sadar subdivision in Kalimpong district
CT: census town, R: rural/ urban centre, M: municipality, F: facility, NP: national park
Abbreviations used in names – TG for Tea Garden (town/village)
Owing to space constraints in the small map, the actual locations in a larger map may vary slightly

=== Location ===
Bhalukhop is located at 27.0872°N 88.4814°E.

Located at an altitude of 5,300 feet (1,600 m) above mean sea level, Bhalukhop has a great sunset view of both Kangchenjunga and Annapurna together, and also the Teesta. It is just 10 km from Kalimpong.

=== Area overview ===
The map alongside shows the Kalimpong Sadar subdivision of Kalimpong district. Physiographically, this area forms the Kalimpong Range, with the average elevation varying from 300 to 3,000 metres (980 to 9,840 ft). This region is characterized by abruptly rising hills and numerous small streams. It is a predominantly rural area with 77.67% of the population living in rural areas and only 22.23% living in the urban areas. While Kalimpong is the only municipality, Dungra is the sole census town in the entire area. The economy is agro-based and there are six tea gardens in the Gorubathan CD block. In 2011, Kalimpong subdivision had a literacy rate of 81.85%, comparable with the highest levels of literacy in the districts of the state. While the first degree college in the subdivision was established at Kalimpong in 1962 the entire subdivision (and now the entire district), other than the head-quarters, had to wait till as late as 2015 (more than half a century) to have their first degree colleges at Pedong and Gorubathan.

Note: The map alongside presents some of the notable locations in the subdivision. All places marked in the map are linked in the larger full screen map.

== Demographics ==
According to the 2011 Census of India, Bhalukhop Khasmahal had a total population of 5,254 of which 2,660 (51%) were males and 2,594 (49%) were females. There were 445 persons in the age range of 0 to 6 years. The total number of literate people in Bhalukhop Khasmahal was 3,879 (80.66% of the population over 6 years).

== Tourism ==
Bhalukhop can be used as a base for day trips to places such as Delo, Lava, Sillery Gaon and Icche Gaon. Due to its proximity to Kalimpong, it is also possible to visit places such as the Cactus Garden, Durpin Monastery and Golf Course.
