= Ramdhura =

Village in West Bengal, India

- Village
- Location in West Bengal, India Ramdhura (India)
- Coordinates: 27.125111°N 88.568156°E
- Country: India
- State: West Bengal
- District: Kalimpong
- Time zone: UTC+5:30 (IST)
- Vehicle registration: WB
- Lok Sabha constituency: Darjeeling
- Vidhan Sabha constituency: Kalimpong
- Website: kalimpongdistrict.in

Ramdhura is a village in Kalimpong II CD block in the Kalimpong Sadar subdivision of the Kalimpong district in the state of West Bengal, India.

== Etymology ==
The name Ramdhura is a combination of Ram (of Ramayana) and Dhura, which means village.

== Geography ==
Places in the Kalimpong Sadar subdivision in Kalimpong district
CT: census town, R: rural/ urban centre, M: municipality, F: facility, NP: national park
Abbreviations used in names – TG for Tea Garden (town/village)
Owing to space constraints in the small map, the actual locations in a larger map may vary slightly

=== Location ===
Ramdhura is located at 27.125111°N 88.568156°E

=== Area overview ===
The map alongside shows the Kalimpong Sadar subdivision of Kalimpong district. Physiographically, this area forms the Kalimpong Range, with the average elevation varying from 300 to 3,000 metres (980 to 9,840 ft). This region is characterized by abruptly rising hills and numerous small streams. It is a predominantly rural area with 77.67% of the population living in rural areas and only 22.23% living in the urban areas. While Kalimpong is the only municipality, Dungra is the sole census town in the entire area. The economy is agro-based and there are 6 tea gardens in the Gorubathan CD block. In 2011, Kalimpong subdivision had a literacy rate of 81.85%, comparable with the highest levels of literacy in the districts of the state. While the first degree college in the subdivision was established at Kalimpong in 1962 the entire subdivision (and now the entire district), other than the head-quarters, had to wait till as late as 2015 (more than half a century) to have their first degree colleges at Pedong and Gorubathan.

Note: The map alongside presents some of the notable locations in the subdivision. All places marked in the map are linked in the larger full screen map.

=== The place ===
It is situated at an elevation of 5000 ft and at a distance of around 15 kilometers from Delo. The village is situated at a moderate height, and forests of pine and other hilly trees offer absolute tranquility.

Ramdhura has a panoramic view. A sunrise with its changing colours over Mt. Kanchenjunga is an attraction. The Teesta River, flowing beneath a green valley, the pine forests, the Cinchona Plantation and flocks of colourful birds and butterflies also attract tourists. From Ramdhura, tourists can visit the nearby tourist interest points of Kalimpong, Pedong and Algarah like Durpin dara, Delo hill, Pedong Monastery. Icche Gaon, Sillery Gaon and its surroundings area like Ramitey Dara, Damsang Fort and Tinchuley view point are also interesting places.

Ramdhura has a very moderate weather and can be visited throughout the year but to get a clear view of Mount Kanchenjunga, it is better to avoid the monsoon.

== Transportation ==
The nearest railway station is New Jalpaiguri Railway station (NJP) which is 86 km away and the nearest airport is Bagdogra Airport which is 89 km from Ramdhura. There is no direct bus service for Ramdhura. Visitors can take a bus from NJP to Kalimpong and from Kalimpong they need to hire a cab for Ramdhura. Otherwise one can book a cab up to Ramdhura from NJP station.
