= Kalimpong I =

- Community development block
- Coordinates: 27.06°N 88.47°E
- Country: India
- State: West Bengal
- District: Kalimpong

Area
  - Total: 360.46 km^{2} (139.17 sq mi)

Population (2011)
  - Total: 74,746
  - Density: 207.36/km^{2} (537.07/sq mi)
- Time zone: UTC+5:30 (IST)
- Lok Sabha constituency: Darjeeling
- Vidhan Sabha constituency: Kalimpong
- Website: kalimpong1bdo.in

Kalimpong I is a community development block (CD block) that forms an administrative division in the Kalimpong subdivision of the Kalimpong district in the Indian state of West Bengal.

== Geography ==
Kalimpong is located at 27°04′N 88°28′E.

The snow-clad mountain ranges, a little to the north of the old Darjeeling district, form the main Himalayan range. Ranges/ ridges branching out from the main Himalayas pass through Darjeeling district. To the north-west towers the giant Kangchenjunga 28,146 ft (8,579 m) and to the north-east is Dongkya 23,184 ft (7,066 m). From Kangchenjunga the Singalila Ridge slopes down southward forming the border between India and Nepal. Manebhanjyang, Sandakphu and Phalut are popular trekking destinations on this ridge. It continues south and south-east through Tunglu and Senchal and other spurs that form the Darjeeling Hills west of the Teesta. To the east of the Teesta, a lofty ridge runs south of Dongkya, bifurcating at Gipmochi 11,518 ft (3,511 m), forming two spurs that contain the valley of the Jaldhaka. The lower portion of this hilly region forms the Kalimpong Hills. Four great hill ranges radiate from a single point at Ghum, a saddle 7,372 ft (2,247 m) high – the first, the Ghum range running due west to Simanabasti; the second, the Senchal-Mahaldiram range sloping south towards Kurseong, the highest points being East Senchel 8,600 ft (2,600 m), Tiger Hill 8,515 ft (2,595 m) and West Senchel 8,163 ft (2,488 m); the third, the Takdah or Takbu range, sloping north-east to a point above the junction of the Great Rangit and Teesta; the fourth, the Darjeeling Jalapahar Range, extending northwards towards Darjeeling.

Kalimpong I CD block is part of the Kalimpong Range physiographic region. The average elevation varies from 300 m to 3,000 m above sea level. “This region is characterised by abruptly rising hills and numerous small river streams coming down in the north-south direction.”

The Teesta forms the boundary between West Bengal and Sikkim along the northern boundaries of Kalimpong II and Kalimpong I CD blocks, up to Teesta Bazaar, after which it flows through Kalimpong I CD block. It enters the plains near Sevoke.

Kalimpong I CD block is bounded by the South Sikkim district of Sikkim and Kalimpong II CD block on the north, Gorubathan CD block on the east, Mal CD block in Jalpaiguri district on the south and Kurseong and Rangli Rangliot CD blocks on the west.

The Kalimpong I CD block has an area of 360.46 km^{2}. It has 1 panchayat samity, 18 gram panchayats, 114 gram sansads (village councils), 51 mouzas, 43 inhabited villages and 1 census town. Gorubathan police station serves this block Headquarters of this CD block is at Kalimpong.

Gram panchayats in Kalimpong I CD block are: Bhalukhop, Bong, Dr. Graham's Homes, Dungra, Kafer Kanke Bong, Kalimpong, Lower Echhay, Neembong, Pabringtar, Putur, Samalbong, Samthar, Seokbir, Sindepong, Tashiding, Tista and Yangmakum.

== Demographics ==
=== Population ===
According to the 2011 Census of India, the Kalimpong I CD block had a total population of 74,746, of which 67,957 were rural and 6,789 were urban. There were 37,750 (51%) males and 36,996 (49%) females. There were 7,422 persons in the age range of 0 to 6 years. The Scheduled Castes numbered 5,213 (6.97%) and the Scheduled Tribes numbered 25,657 (34.33%).

Census town in the Kalimpong I CD block are (2011 census figures in brackets): Dungra Khasmahal (6,789).

Large villages (with 4,000+ population) in the Kalimpong I CD block are (2011 census figures in brackets): Icha Khasmahal (4,176), Sindibong Khasmahal (7,606), Bhalukhop Khasmahal (5,404), Kalimpong Khasmahal (8,881) and Bong Khasmahal (4,220).

Other villages in the Kalimpong I CD block include (2011 census figures in brackets): Homes St. and Grahims (3,899), Kanke Bong (1,835), Teesta Bazaar (2,953), Nimbong (2,659), Yang Makum Khasmahal (3,350), Samalbong Khasmahal (2,050), Pudung (2,382), Kanke Bong Khasmahal (1,835), Mangpong Forest (1,111), Kaffir Khasmahal (549) and Suntalay Khasmahal (209).

=== Literacy ===
According to the 2011 census the total number of literate persons in the Kalimpog I CD block was 54,820 (81.43% of the population over 6 years) out of which males numbered 29,389 (86.55% of the male population over 6 years) and females numbered 25,431 (76.21% of the female population over 6 years). The gender disparity (the difference between female and male literacy rates) was 10.34%.

See also – List of West Bengal districts ranked by literacy rate

Literacy in CD blocks of
Darjeeling district (2011)
Darjeeling Sadar subdivision
Darjeeling Pulbazar – 80.78%
Rangli Rangliot – 80.50%
Jorebunglow Sukhiapokhri – 82.54%
Kalimpong subdivision
Kalimpong I – 81.43%
Kalimpong II – 79.68%
Gorubathan – 76.88%
Kurseong subdivision
Kurseong – 81.15%
Mirik subdivision
Mirik – 80.84%
Siliguri subdivision
Matigara – 74.78%
Naxalbari – 75.47%
Phansidewa – 64.46%
Kharibari – 67.37%
2011 Census: CD Block Wise

Primary Census Abstract Data

=== Language and religion ===
Religion in Kalimpong I CD block (2011)
Hinduism	58.74%
Christianity	19.47%
Buddhism	18.94%
Kirat Mundhum	1.63%
Islam	1.14%
Other or not stated	0.09%

In the 2011 census, Hindus numbered 43,903 and formed 58.74% of the population in the Kalimpong I CD block. Christians numbered 14,550 and formed 19.47% of the population. Buddhists numbered 14,156 and formed 18.94% of the population. Muslims numbered 853 and formed 1.14% of the population. Others numbered 1,284 and formed 1.72% of the population.

Languages of Kalimpong I CD block (2011)
1. Nepali (90.0%)
2. Lepcha (5.57%)
3. Hindi (1.33%)
4. Others (3.14%)

At the time of the 2011 census, 89.96% of the population spoke Nepali, 5.57% Lepcha and 1.33% Hindi as their first language.

The West Bengal Official Language Act 1961 declared that Bengali and Nepali were to be used for official purposes in the three hill subdivisions of Darjeeling, Kalimpong and Kurseong in Darjeeling district.

== Rural poverty ==
According to the Rural Household Survey in 2005, 24.40% of the total number of families were BPL families in the Darjeeling district. According to a World Bank report, as of 2012, 4-9% of the population in Darjeeling, North 24 Parganas and South 24 Parganas districts were below poverty level, the lowest among the districts of West Bengal, which had an average 20% of the population below poverty line.

== Economy ==
=== Livelihood ===
Livelihood
in Kalimpong I CD block
1. Cultivators (24.0%)
2. Agricultural labourers (33.5%)
3. Household industries (1.38%)
4. Other Workers (41.2%)

In the Kalimpong I CD block in 2011, among the class of total workers, cultivators numbered 7,089 and formed 23.99%, agricultural labourers numbered 9,891 and formed 33.47%, household industry workers numbered 407 and formed 1.38% and other workers numbered 12,164 and formed 41.16%. Total workers numbered 29,551 and formed 39.54% of the total population, and non-workers numbered 45,195 and formed 60.46% of the population.

Note: In the census records a person is considered a cultivator, if the person is engaged in cultivation/ supervision of land owned by self/government/institution. When a person who works on another person's land for wages in cash or kind or share, is regarded as an agricultural labourer. Household industry is defined as an industry conducted by one or more members of the family within the household or village, and one that does not qualify for registration as a factory under the Factories Act. Other workers are persons engaged in some economic activity other than cultivators, agricultural labourers and household workers. It includes factory, mining, plantation, transport and office workers, those engaged in business and commerce, teachers, entertainment artistes and so on.

=== Infrastructure ===
There are 43 inhabited villages in the Kalimpong I CD block, as per the District Census Handbook, Darjiling, 2011. 100% villages have power supply. 40 villages (93.02%) have drinking water supply. 20 villages (46.51%) have post offices. 31 villages (72.09%) have telephones (including landlines, public call offices and mobile phones). 19 villages (44.19%) have pucca (paved) approach roads and 10 villages (23.26%) have transport communication (includes bus service, rail facility and navigable waterways). 6 villages (13.95%) have agricultural credit societies and 4 villages (9.30%) have banks.

=== Agriculture ===
In 2012–13, there were 3 fertiliser depots, 3 seed stores and 36 fair price shops in Kalimpong I CD block.

In 2013–14, Kalimpong I CD block produced 5,467 tonnes of Aman paddy, the main winter crop, from 2,531 hectares, 42 tonnes of wheat from 37 hectares, 12,133 tonnes of maize from 5,695 hectares and 2,775 tonnes of potatoes from 293 hectares. It also produced some oilseeds.

=== Tea gardens ===
Darjeeling tea “received the iconic status due to its significant aroma, taste and colour… the first Indian product to be marked with the Geographical Indication (GI) tag in 2003… As per the definition, “Darjeeling Tea” can only refer to tea that has been cultivated, grown, produced, manufactured and processed in tea gardens in few specific hilly areas of the district.” Apart from the hill areas, tea is also grown in the plain areas of the terai and dooars, but such gardens are not covered under the GI tag.

As of 2009–10, there were 87 tea gardens covered under the GI tag, employing 51,091 persons. Total land under cultivation was 17,828.38 hectares and total production was 7.36 million kg. A much larger population is indirectly dependent on the tea industry in the district. The average annual production including those from the plain areas, exceeds 10 million kg.

As of 2013, Darjeeling subdivision had 46 tea estates, Kalimpong subdivision had 29 tea estates and Kurseong subdivision had 6 tea gardens. This added up to 81 tea estates in the hill areas. Bannackburn Tea Estate and Lingia Tea Estate in Darjeeling were the first to come up in 1835. Siliguri subdivision in the terai region had 45 tea estates.

=== Hydro-electric power ===
There is 4 x 40 MW hydroelectric power generation at Teesta Low Dam - IV Hydropower Plant near Kalijhora. The Teesta Low Dam - III Hydropower Plant near Rambi Bazar produces 132 MW of hydel power.

=== Banking ===
In 2012–13, Kalimpong I CD block had offices of 1 commercial bank and 2 gramin banks.

== Transport ==
Kalimpong I CD block has 4 originating/ terminating bus routes. The nearest railway station is 49 km from the block headquarters.

National Highway 10 passes through Kalimpong I CD block.

State Highway 12 passes through Kalimpong I CD block.

== Education ==
In 2012–13, Kalimpong I CD block had 111 primary schools with 8,420 students, 6 middle schools with 1,519 students, 5 high schools with 3,036 students and 1 higher secondary school with 2,123 students. Kalimpong I CD block had 207 institutions for special and non-formal education with 6,859 students. Kalimpong municipal area (outside the CD block) had 2 general degree colleges with 2,373 students and 3 technical/ professional institutions with 456 students.

See also – Education in India

According to the 2011 census, in Kalimpong I CD block, among the 43 inhabited villages, 7 villages did not have a school, 27 villages had two or more primary schools, 19 villages had at least 1 primary and 1 middle school and 7 villages had at least 1 middle and 1 secondary school.

== Healthcare ==
In 2013, Kalimpong I CD block had 1 hospital, 1 rural hospital and 2 primary health centres with total 62 beds and 4 doctors (excluding private bodies). It had 20 family welfare subcentres. 1,089 patients were treated indoor and 16,415 patients were treated outdoor in the hospitals, health centres and subcentres of the CD block.

Rambi Rural Hospital, with 30 beds at Rambi Bazar, PO Reang, is the major government medical facility in the Kalimpong I CD block. There are primary health centres at Samthar (with 6 beds) and Teesta Bazaar (with 10 beds).
