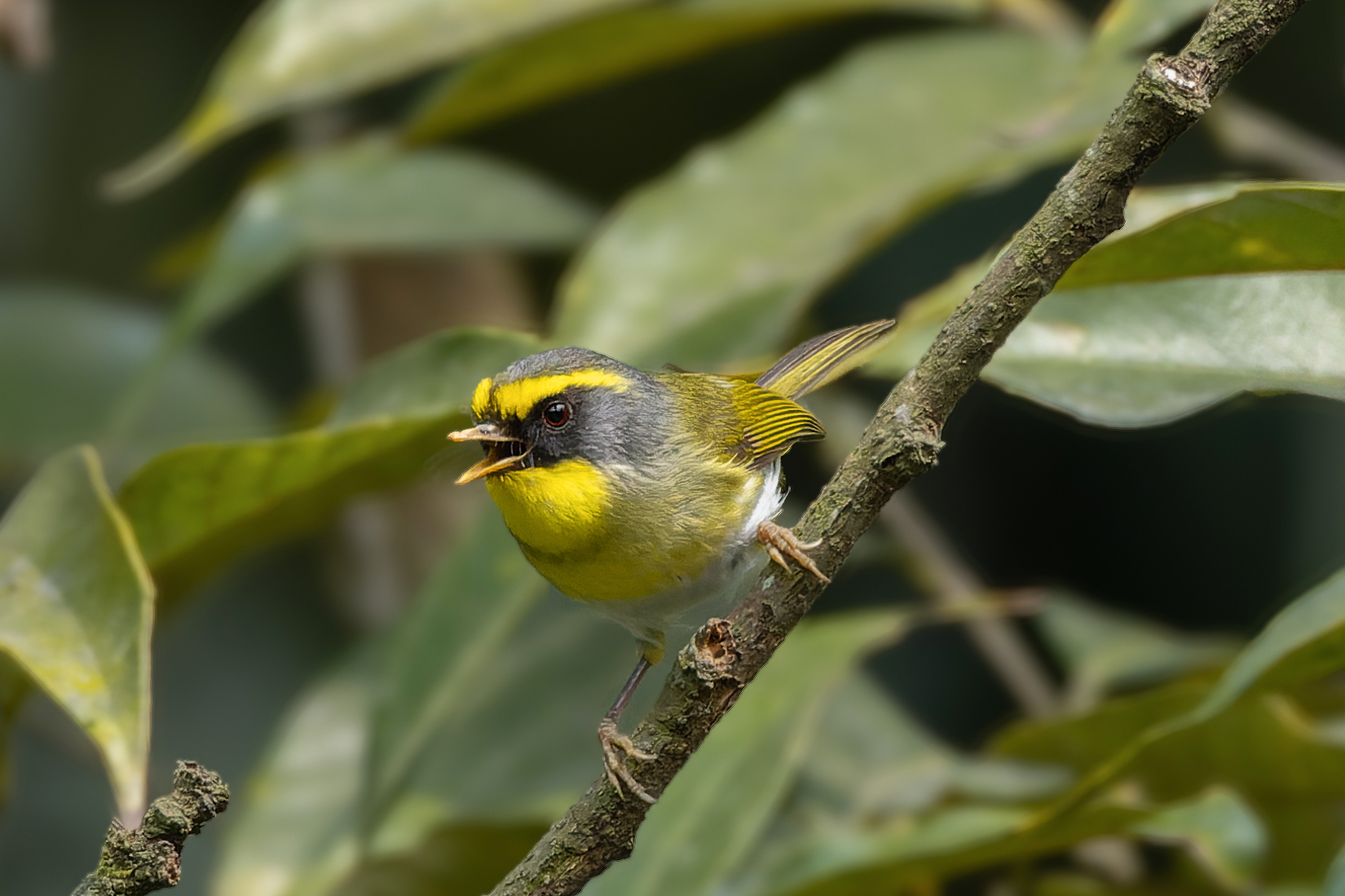
- Black-faced Warbler (Abroscopus schisticeps) in Sillery Gaon, West Bengal, India.

Conservation status
- Least Concern (IUCN 3.1)

Scientific classification
- Kingdom: Animalia
- Phylum: Chordata
- Class: Aves
- Order: Passeriformes
- Family: Cettiidae
- Genus: Abroscopus
- Species: A. schisticeps

Binomial name
- Abroscopus schisticeps (Gray, JE & Gray, GR, 1847)
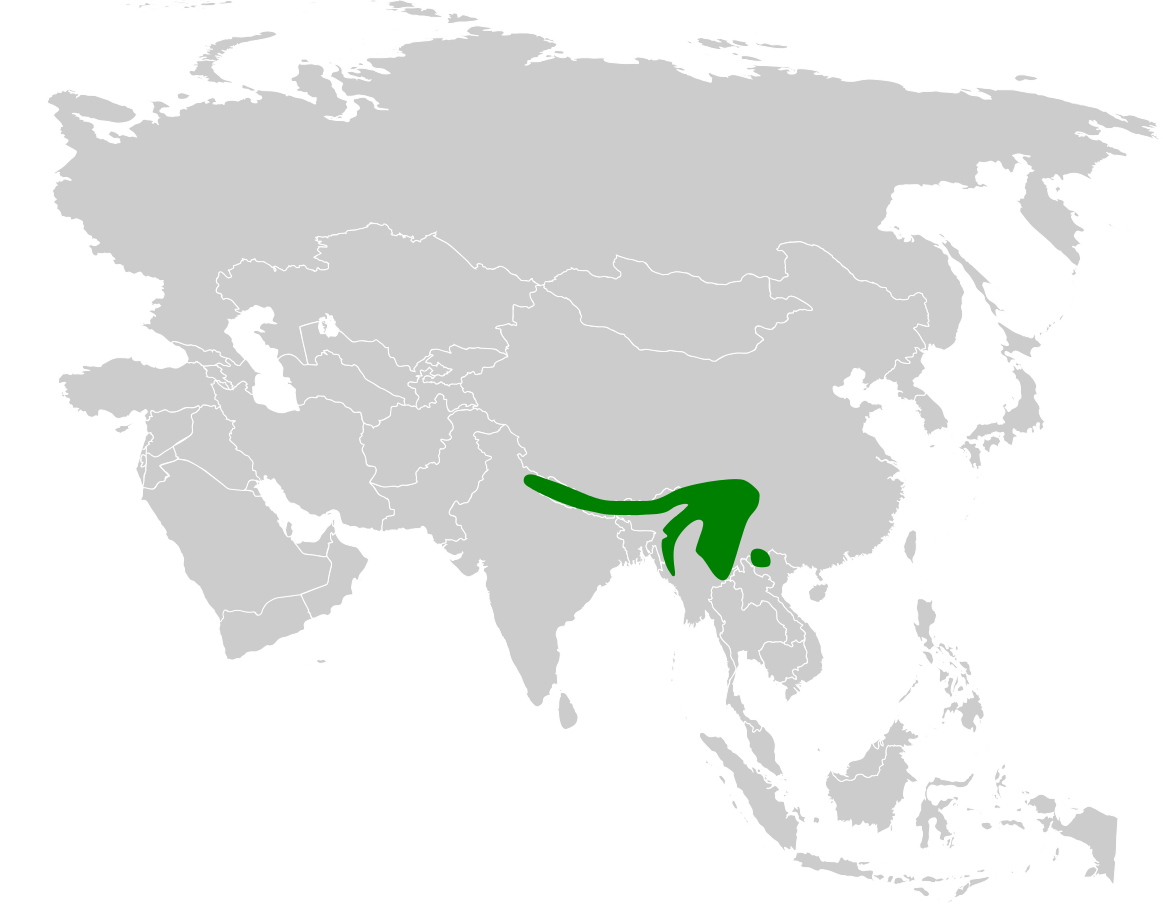
- Global range

= Black-faced warbler =

Species of bird

The black-faced warbler (Abroscopus schisticeps) is a species of bush warbler (family Cettiidae). It was formerly included in the "Old World warbler" assemblage.

It is found in Bhutan, China, India, Myanmar, Nepal, and Vietnam. Its natural habitats are subtropical or tropical moist lowland forest and subtropical or tropical moist montane forest and scrub, occurring at altitudes from 1,500–2,700 m, occasionally down to 600 m, and is non-migratory.

== Gallery ==
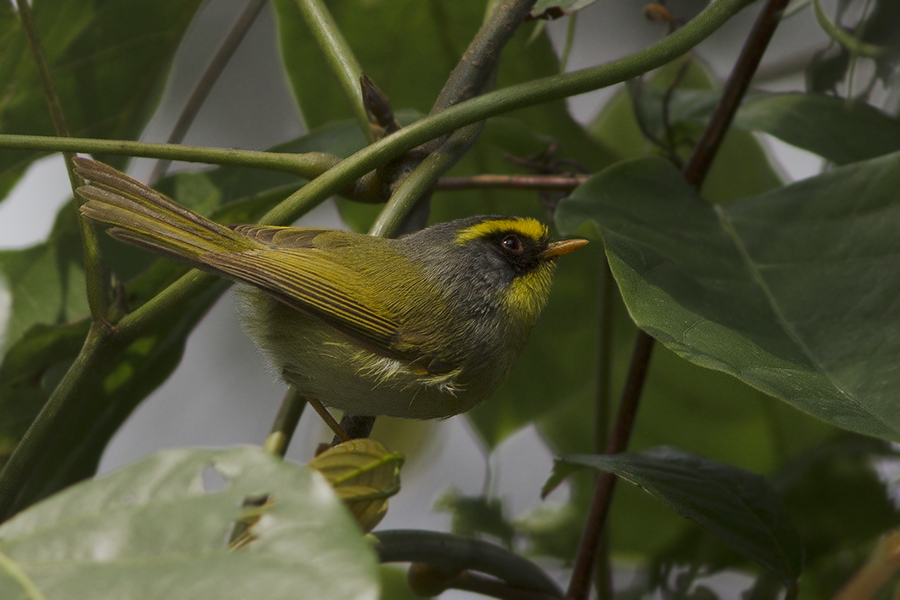
Neora Valley National Park, West Bengal

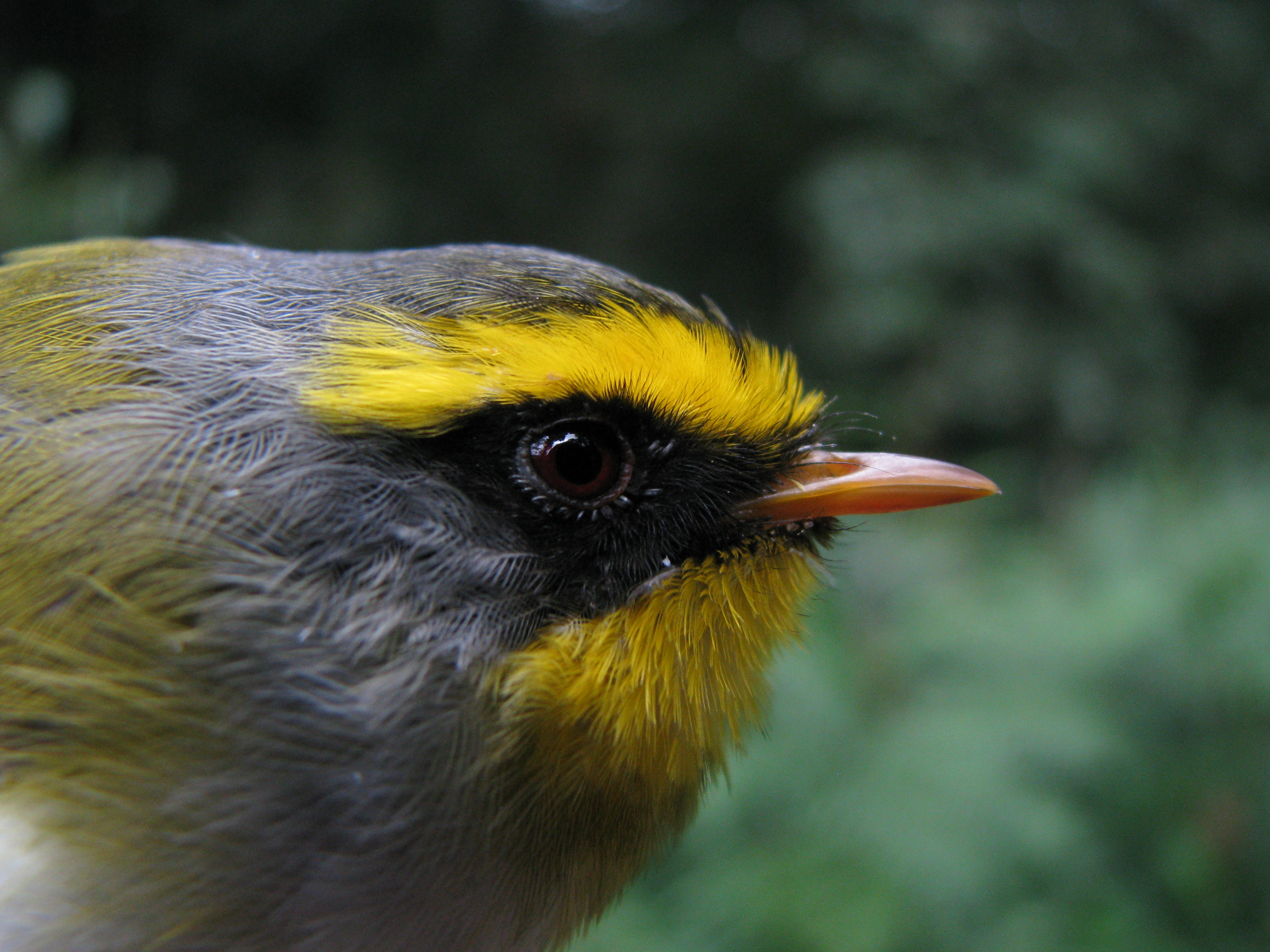

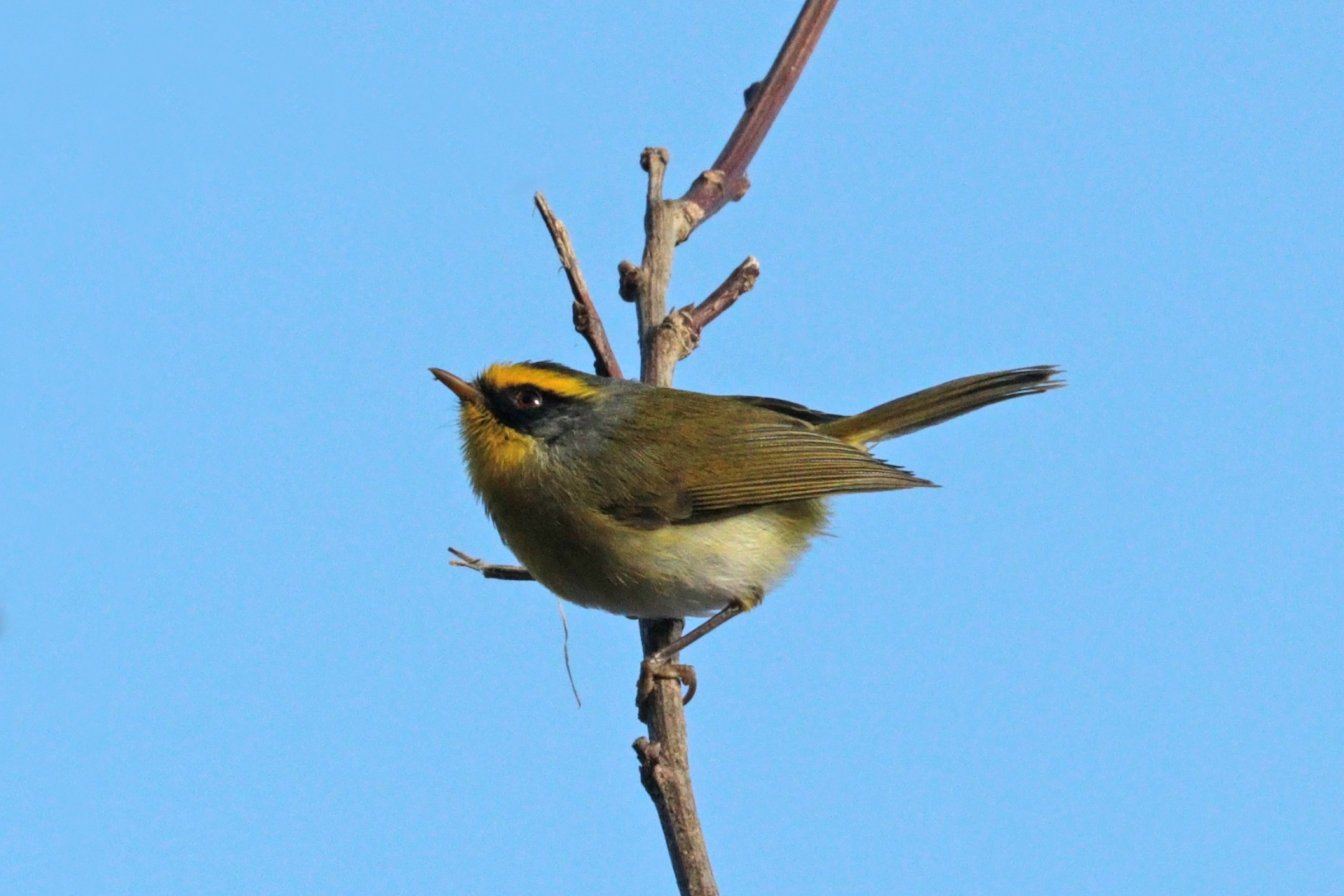
Mount Phulchowki, Nepal
