= Rambi Bazar =

- Urban Village
- Location in West Bengal, India Rambi Bazar (India)
- Coordinates: 26.9926°N 88.4138°E
- Country: India
- State: West Bengal
- District: Kalimpong

Population (2011)
  - Total: 1,000
- Time zone: UTC+5:30 (IST)
- Vehicle registration: WB
- Lok Sabha constituency: Darjeeling
- Vidhan Sabha constituency: Kalimpong
- Nearest Cities: Kalimpong, Siliguri
- Website: kalimpong.gov.in

Rambi Bazar is an urban village lying near Teesta River in the Kalimpong I CD block in the Kalimpong Sadar subdivision of the Kalimpong district in the state of West Bengal, India. The town lies on the National Highway 10 connecting Siliguri and Gangtok. Teesta Low Dam - III Hydropower Plant and Riyang railway station lies in Rambi. Rambi bazaar is famous for Mushroom, there are around 30 to 40 mushroom shops and stalls in the market area where different types of edible mushrooms are available for sale.

== Geography ==
Places in the Kalimpong Sadar subdivision in Kalimpong district
CT: census town, R: rural/ urban centre, M: municipality, F: facility, NP: national park
Abbreviations used in names – TG for Tea Garden (town/village)
Owing to space constraints in the small map, the actual locations in a larger map may vary slightly

=== Location ===
Rambi Bazar is located at 26.9926°N 88.4138°E.

=== Area overview ===
The map alongside shows the Kalimpong Sadar subdivision of Kalimpong district. Physiographically, this area forms the Kalimpong Range, with the average elevation varying from 300 to 3,000 metres (980 to 9,840 ft). This region is characterized by abruptly rising hills and numerous small streams. It is a predominantly rural area with 77.67% of the population living in rural areas and only 22.23% living in the urban areas. While Kalimpong is the only municipality, Dungra is the sole census town in the entire area. The economy is agro-based and there are 6 tea gardens in the Gorubathan CD block. In 2011, Kalimpong subdivision had a literacy rate of 81.85%, comparable with the highest levels of literacy in the districts of the state. While the first degree college in the subdivision was established at Kalimpong in 1962 the entire subdivision (and now the entire district), other than the head-quarters, had to wait till as late as 2015 (more than half a century) to have their first degree colleges at Pedong and Gorubathan.

Note: The map alongside presents some of the notable locations in the subdivision. All places marked in the map are linked in the larger full screen map.

== Demographics ==
According to the 2011 Census of India, Rambi Bazar had a total population of 1,000 of which 510 (51%) were males and 490 (49%) were females. There were 104 persons in the age range of 0 to 6 years. The total number of literate people in Rambi Bazar was 775 (86.50% of the population over 6 years).

== Economy ==
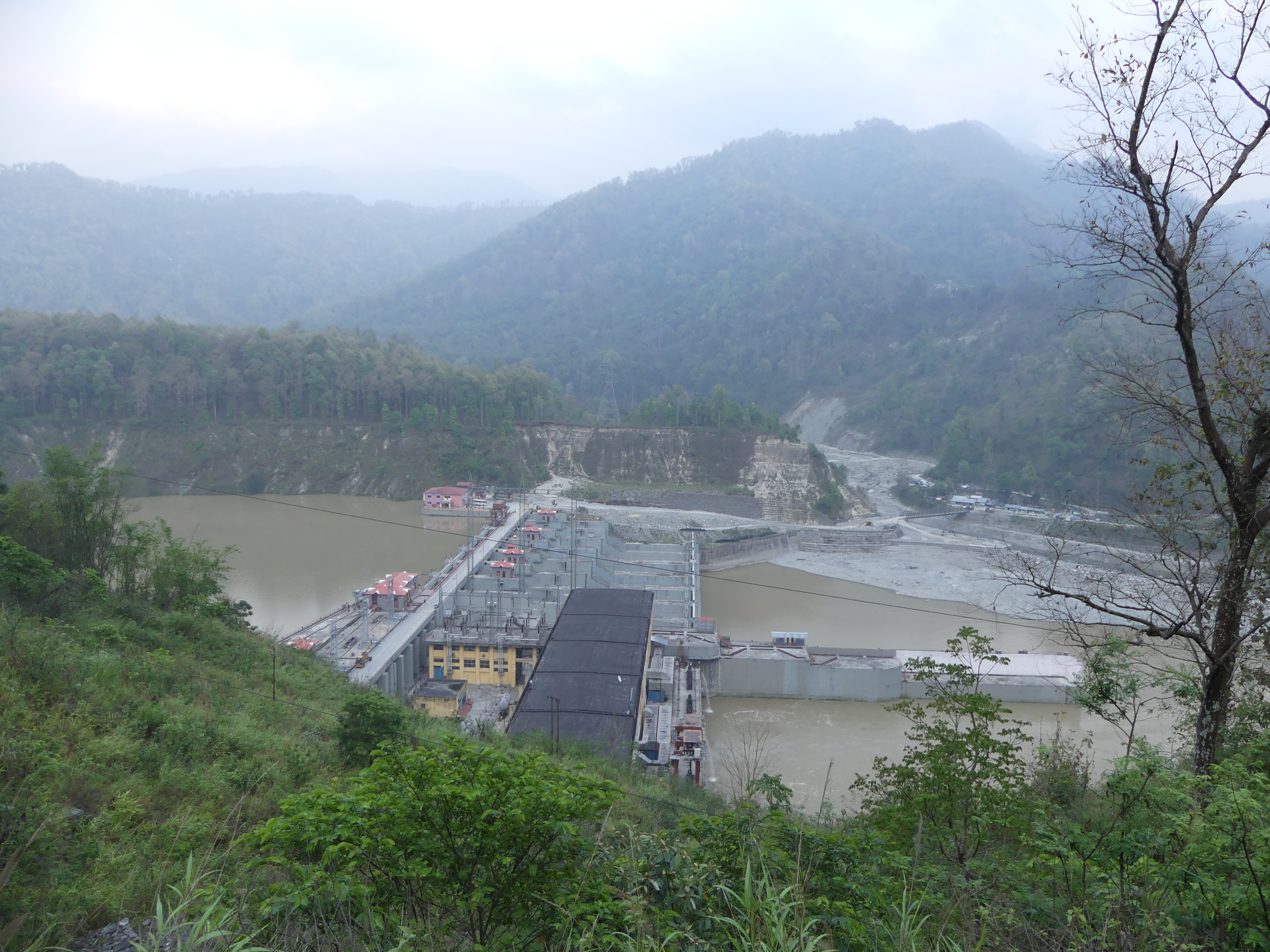
Teesta Low Dam III

Teesta Low Dam - III Hydropower Plant produces 132 MW of electricity.

== Healthcare ==
Rambi Rural Hospital, with 30 beds, is the major government medical facility in the Kalimpong I CD block. There are primary health centres at Samthar (with 6 beds) and Teesta Bazaar (with 10 beds).

== Transport ==
National Highway 10 connecting Siliguri and Gangtok passes through Rambi Bazar. The town is served by Riyang Railway Station which is the part of under-construction Sivok Rangpo Railway line. Bagdogra International Airport is the nearest airport from Rambi Bazaar.
