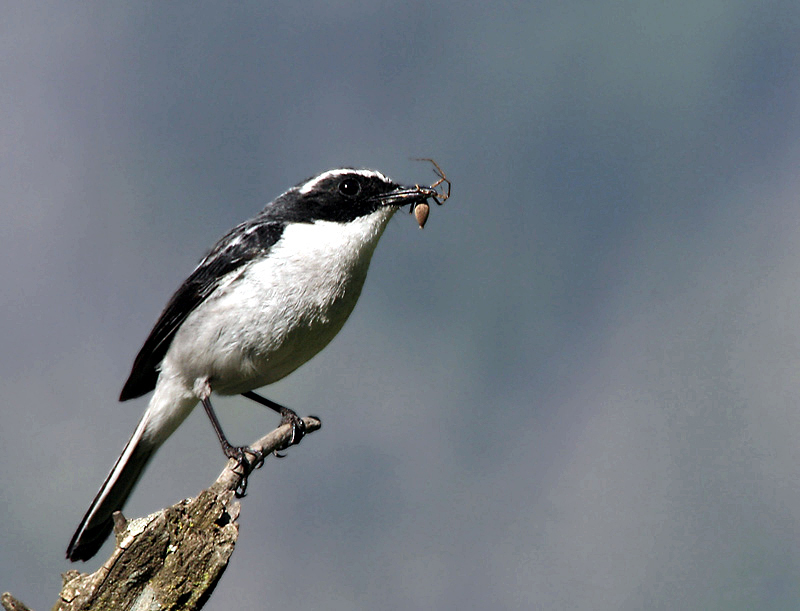
- Male with the feed for juveniles at Guna Pani (8,000 ft.) in Kullu - Manali District of Himachal Pradesh, India.
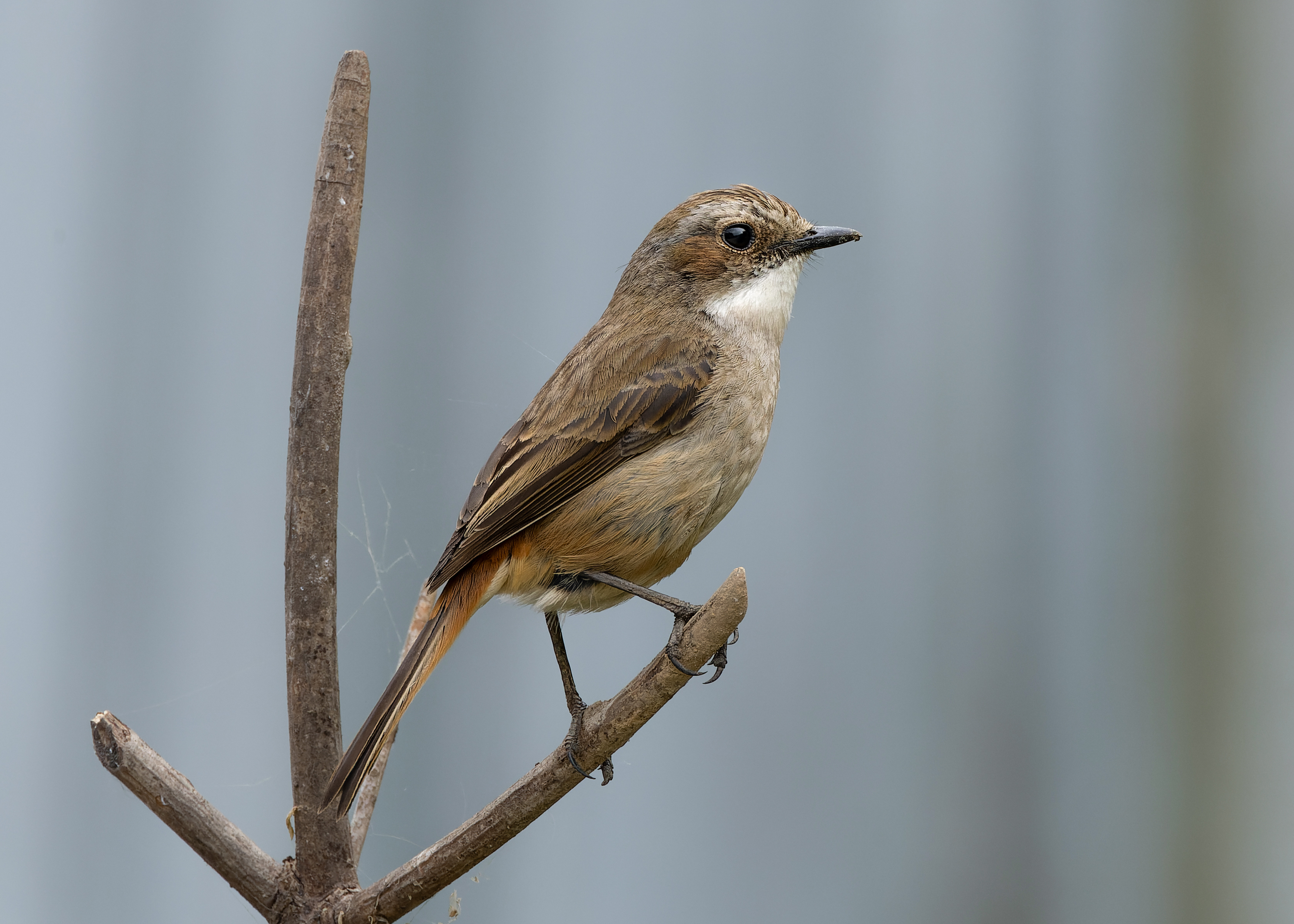
- Female in Sillery Gaon, West Bengal, India.

Conservation status
- Least Concern (IUCN 3.1)

Scientific classification
- Kingdom: Animalia
- Phylum: Chordata
- Class: Aves
- Order: Passeriformes
- Family: Muscicapidae
- Genus: Saxicola
- Species: S. ferreus

Binomial name
- Saxicola ferreus Gray, JE & Gray, GR, 1847

= Grey bush chat =

Species of bird

The grey bush chat (Saxicola ferreus) is a species of passerine bird in the family Muscicapidae. It is found in the Himalayas, southern China, Taiwan, Nepal and mainland Southeast Asia.

Its natural habitats are subtropical or tropical moist lowland forest and subtropical or tropical moist montane forest.

== Gallery ==
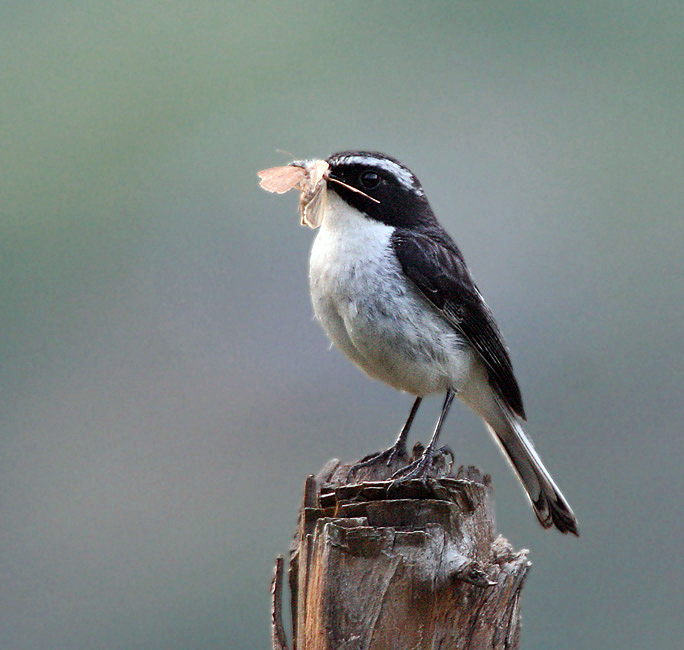
Male with the feed for juveniles at 8,000 ft.in Kullu - Manali District of Himachal Pradesh, India

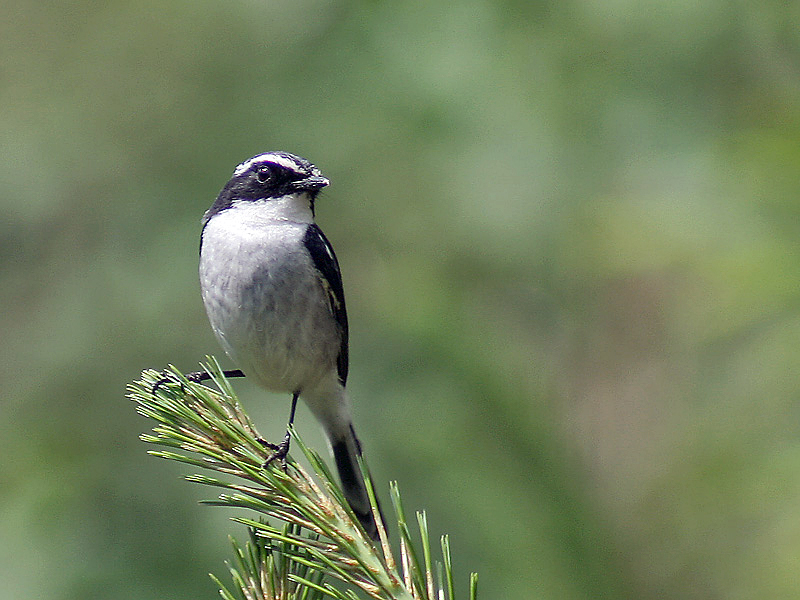
Male at 8,000 ft.in Kullu - Manali District of Himachal Pradesh, India

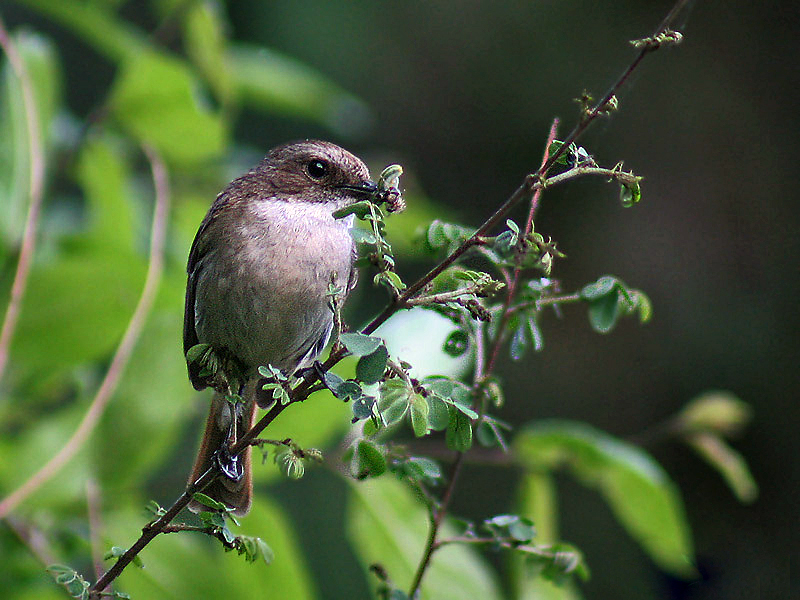
Female with the feed for juveniles at 8,000 ft. in Kullu - Manali District of Himachal Pradesh, India

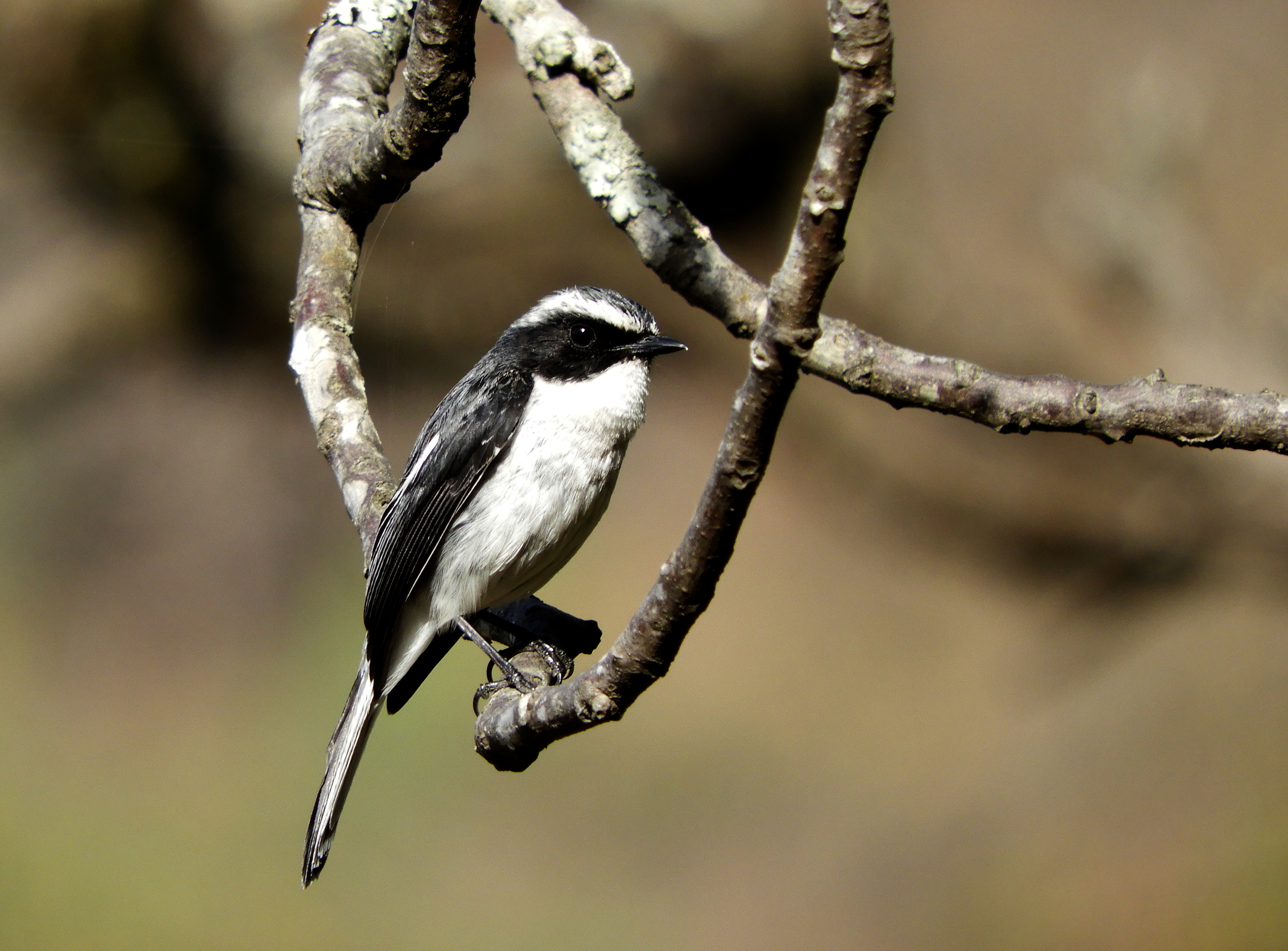
Male Grey Bushchat at Sattal India

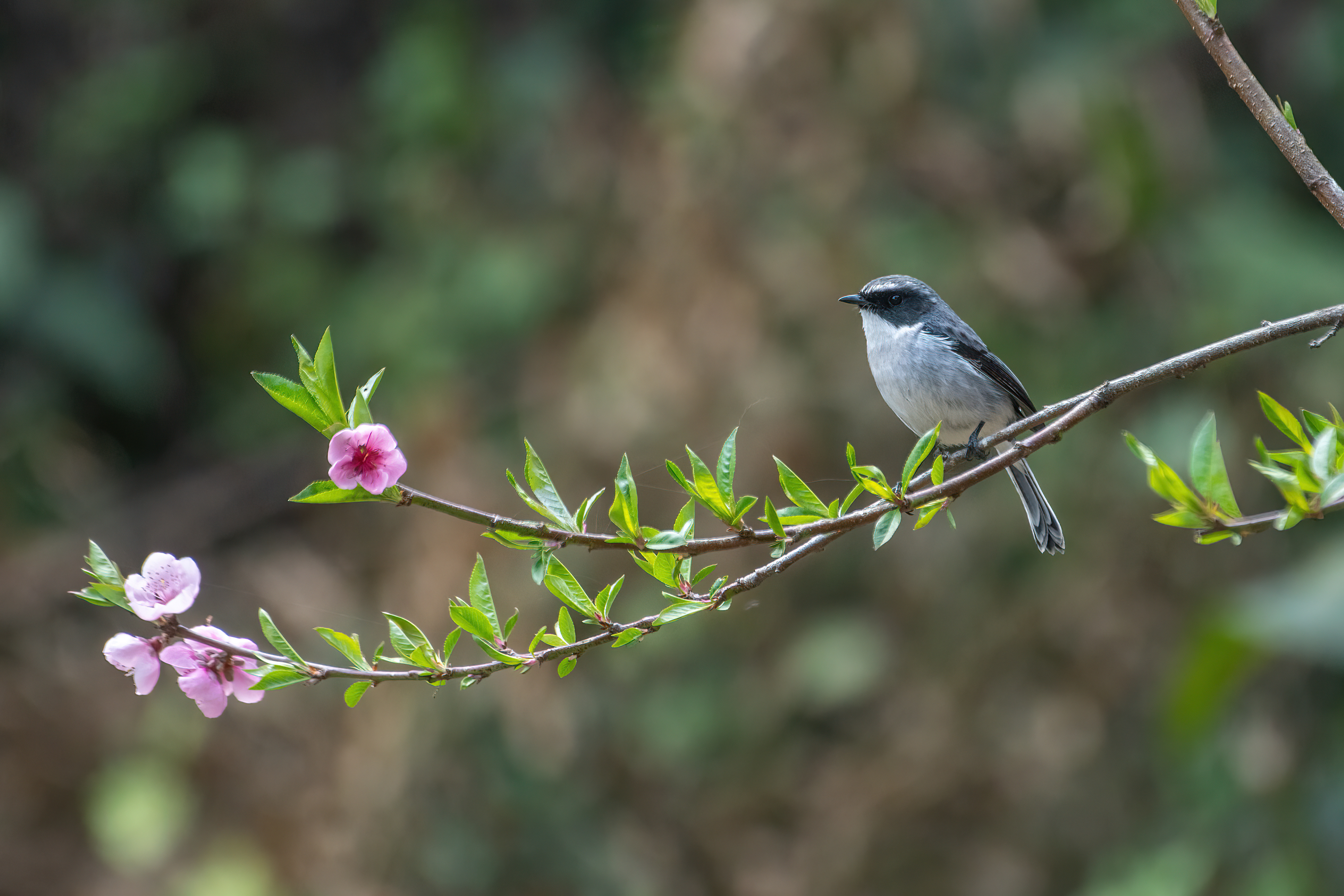
At Kakani Shivapuri Nagarjun National Park, Nepal
