= Suntalay Khasmahal =

- Village
- Location in West Bengal, India Suntalay Khasmahal (India)
- Coordinates: 26.971632°N 88.416632°E
- Country: India
- State: West Bengal
- District: Kalimpong

Government
  - Body: Gram panchayat

Population (2011)
  - Total: 210

Languages
  - Official: Nepali, Bengali, English
- Time zone: UTC+5:30 (IST)
- ISO 3166 code: IN-WB
- Vehicle registration: WB
- Website: kalimpongdistrict.in

Suntalay Khasmahal is a village in the Kalimpong I CD block in the Kalimpong Sadar subdivision of the Kalimpong district in the state of West Bengal, India.

== Geography ==
Suntalaya Khasmahal is 10.5 km from Kalimpong.

== Population ==
The population was 210 inhabitants in 2011.

Suntalay Khasmahal is a medium-sized village located in Kalimpong district, West Bengal with total 43 families residing. The Suntalay Khasmahal village has population of 209 of which 117 are males while 92 are females as per Population Census 2011. In Suntalay Khasmahal village population of children with age 0–6 is 20 which makes up 9.57% of total population of village. Average Sex Ratio of Suntalay Khasmahal village is 786 which is lower than West Bengal state average of 950. Child Sex Ratio for the Suntalay Khasmahal as per census is 667, lower than West Bengal average of 956.
