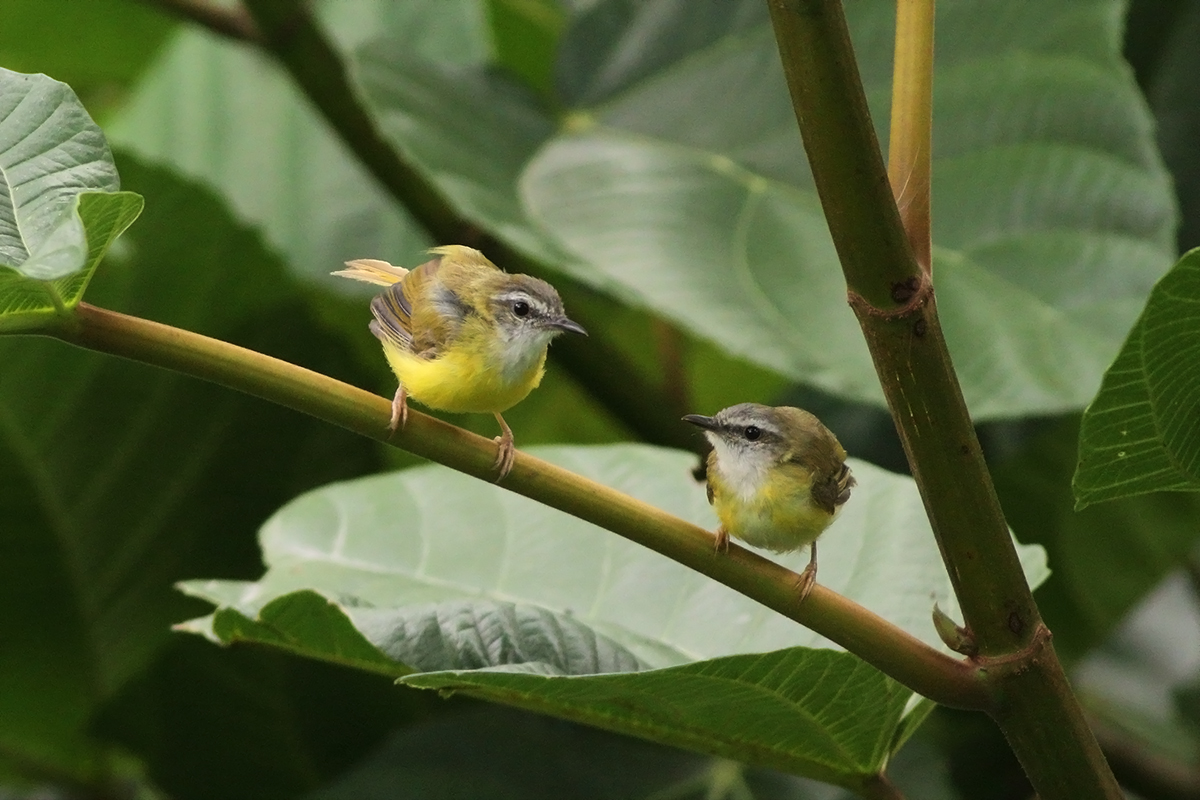
- From East Pendam, Sikkim, India

Conservation status
- Least Concern (IUCN 3.1)

Scientific classification
- Kingdom: Animalia
- Phylum: Chordata
- Class: Aves
- Order: Passeriformes
- Family: Cettiidae
- Genus: Abroscopus
- Species: A. superciliaris

Binomial name
- Abroscopus superciliaris (Blyth, 1859)
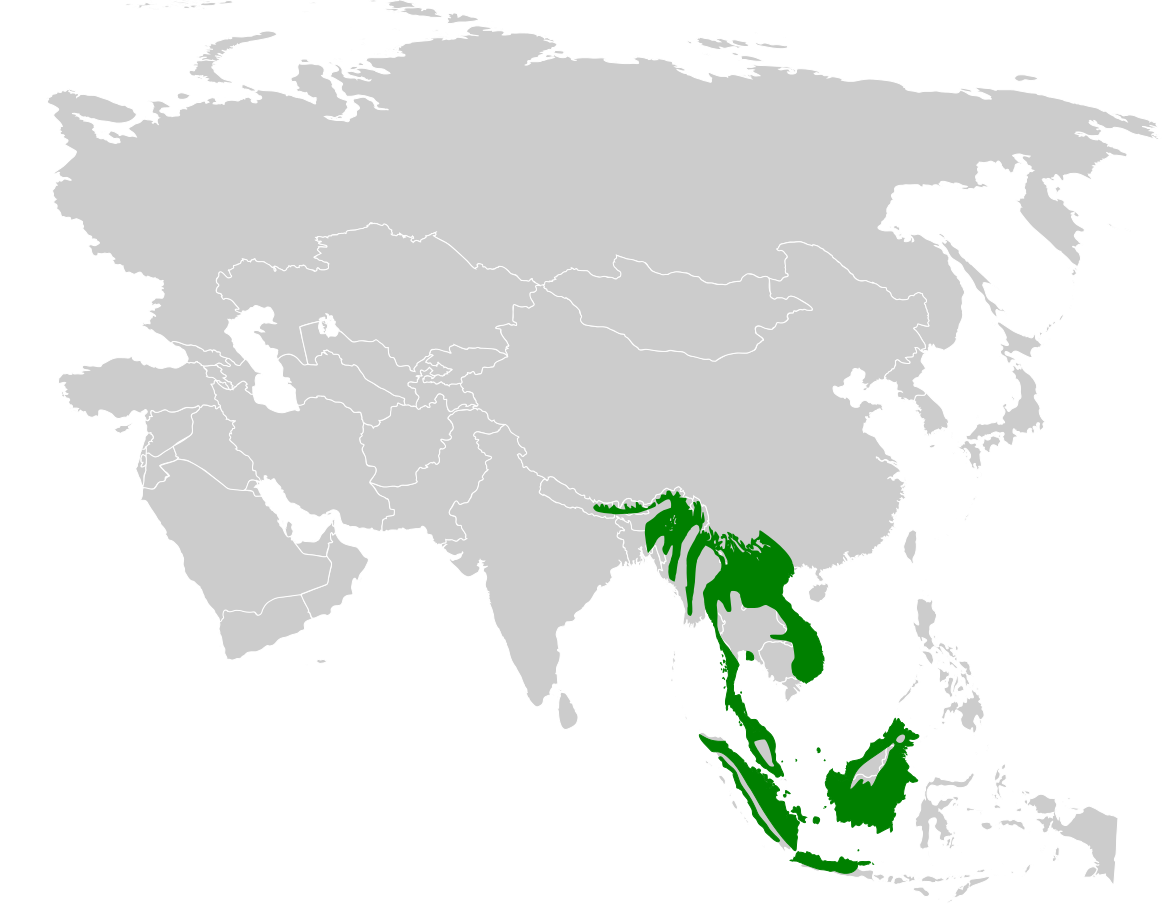

= Yellow-bellied warbler =

Species of bird

The yellow-bellied warbler (Abroscopus superciliaris) is a species of bush warbler (family Cettiidae). It was formerly included in the "Old World warbler" assemblage.

It is found in Bangladesh, Bhutan, Brunei, Cambodia, China, India, Indonesia, Laos, Malaysia, Myanmar, Nepal, Thailand, and Vietnam. Its natural habitats are temperate forest, subtropical or tropical moist lowland forest, and subtropical or tropical moist montane forest.

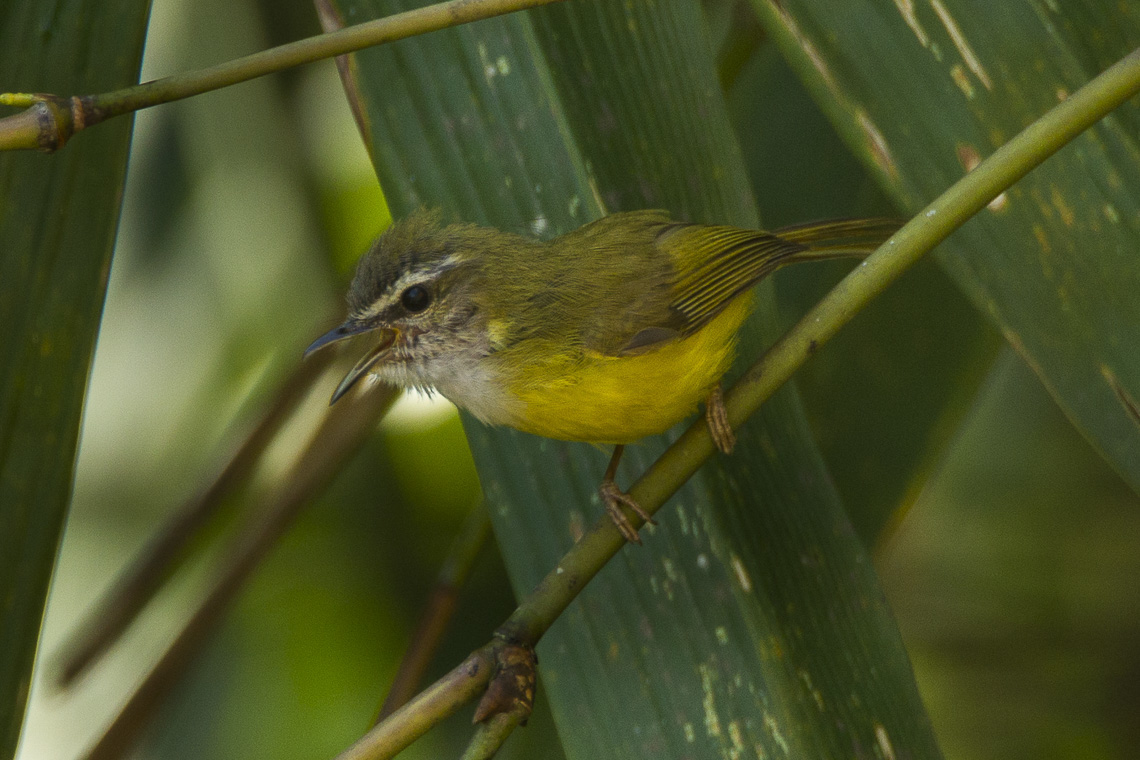
At Tingtibi, Bhutan.
