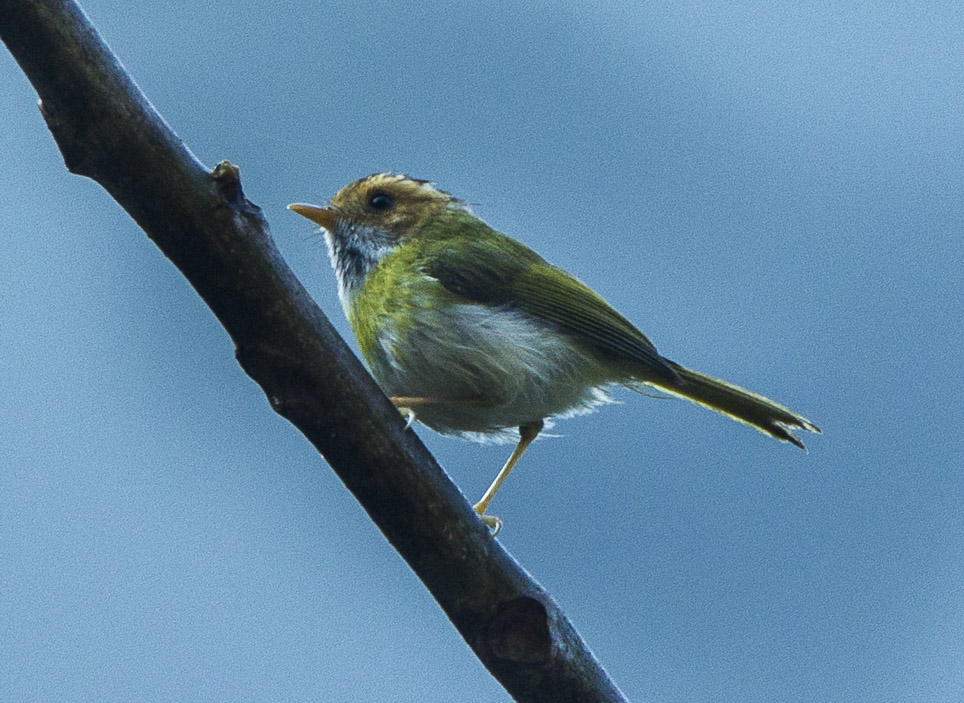
- in Zhemgang District, Bhutan

Conservation status
- Least Concern (IUCN 3.1)

Scientific classification
- Kingdom: Animalia
- Phylum: Chordata
- Class: Aves
- Order: Passeriformes
- Family: Cettiidae
- Genus: Abroscopus
- Species: A. albogularis

Binomial name
- Abroscopus albogularis (Moore, F, 1854)
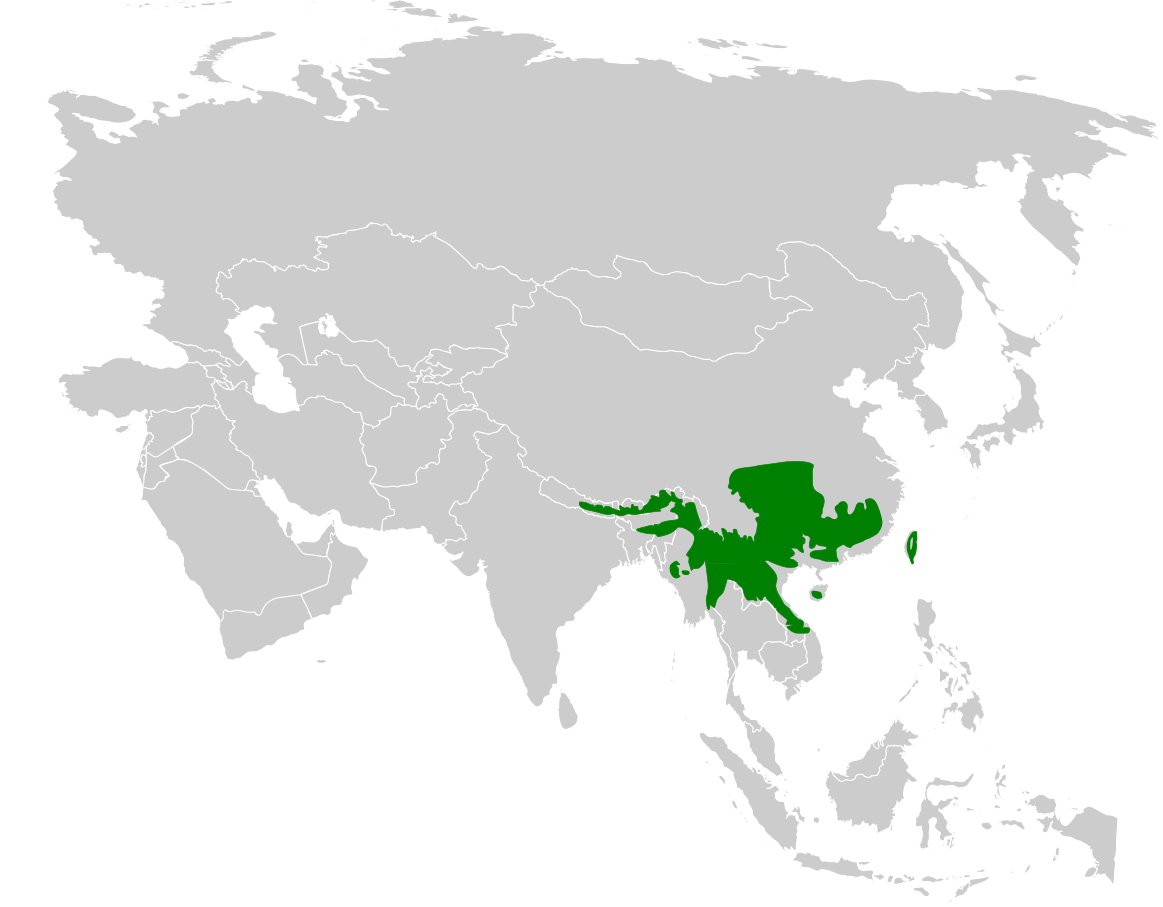

= Rufous-faced warbler =

Species of bird

The rufous-faced warbler (Abroscopus albogularis) is a species of the bush warbler family, Cettiidae. It was formerly included in the "Old World warbler" assemblage.

It is found in Bangladesh, Bhutan, China, India, Laos, Myanmar, Nepal, Taiwan, Thailand, and Vietnam. Its natural habitat is subtropical or tropical moist lowland forest.

== Social Behavior ==
It often participates in inter-species flocks, especially with leaf warblers.

== Gallery ==
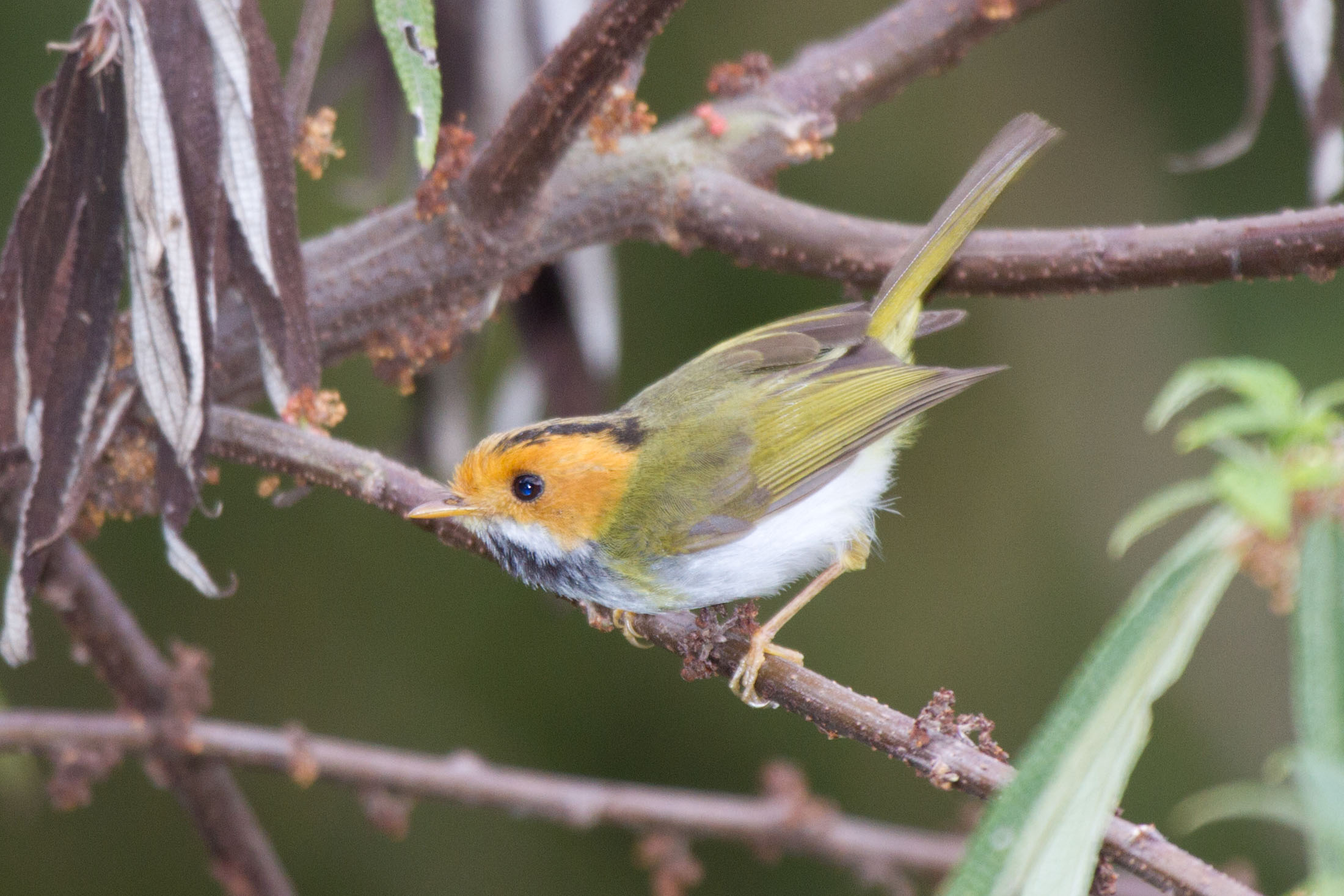

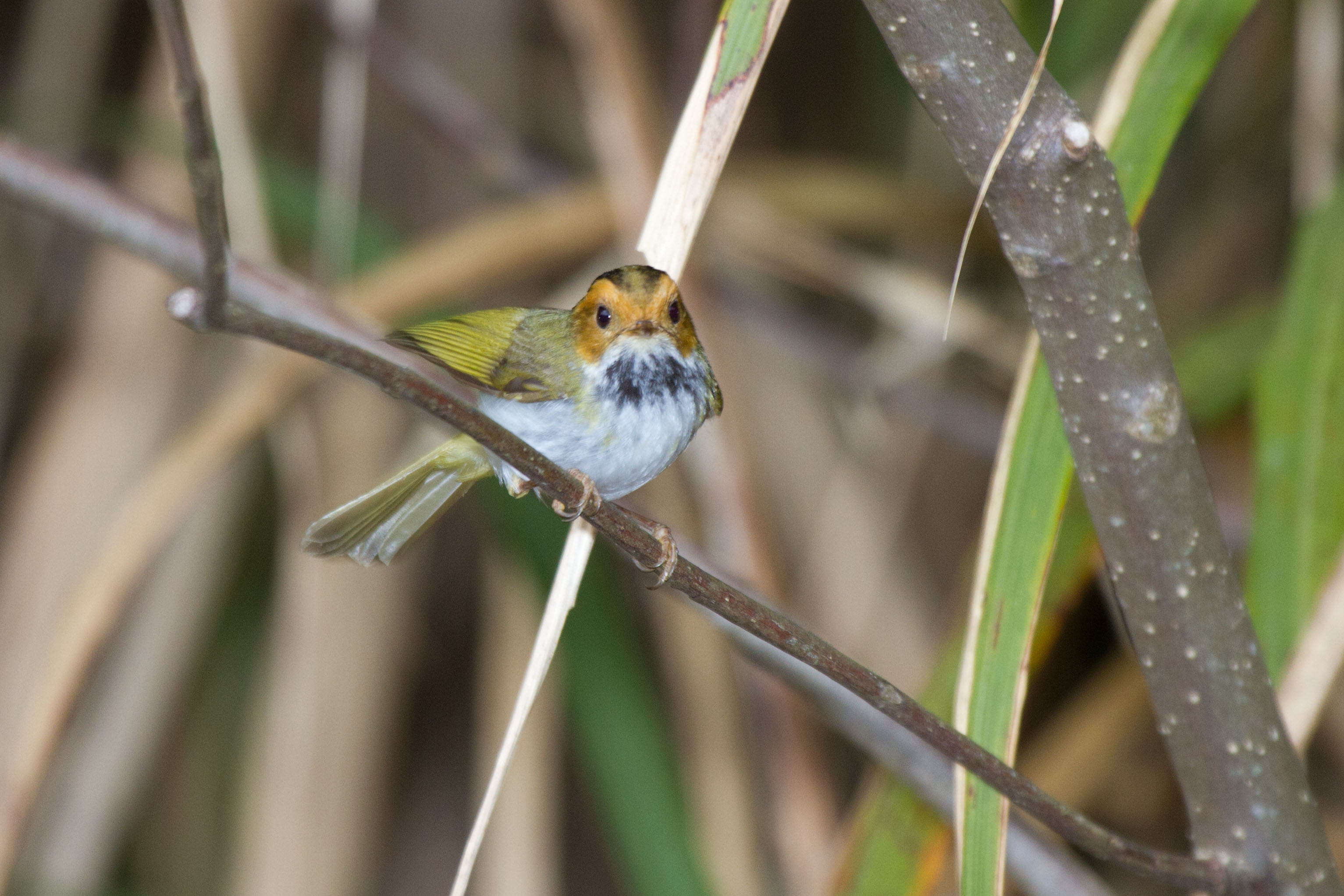

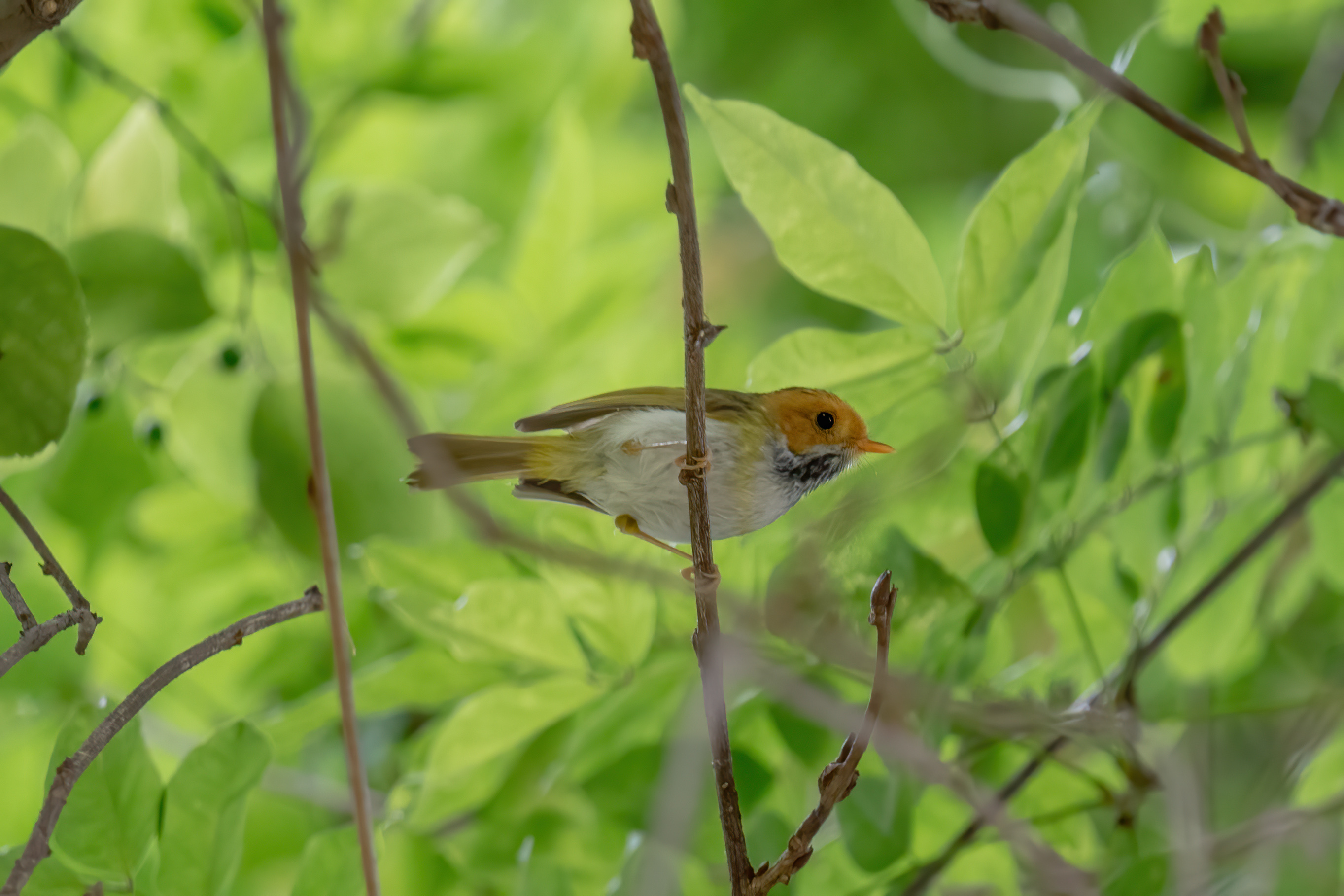

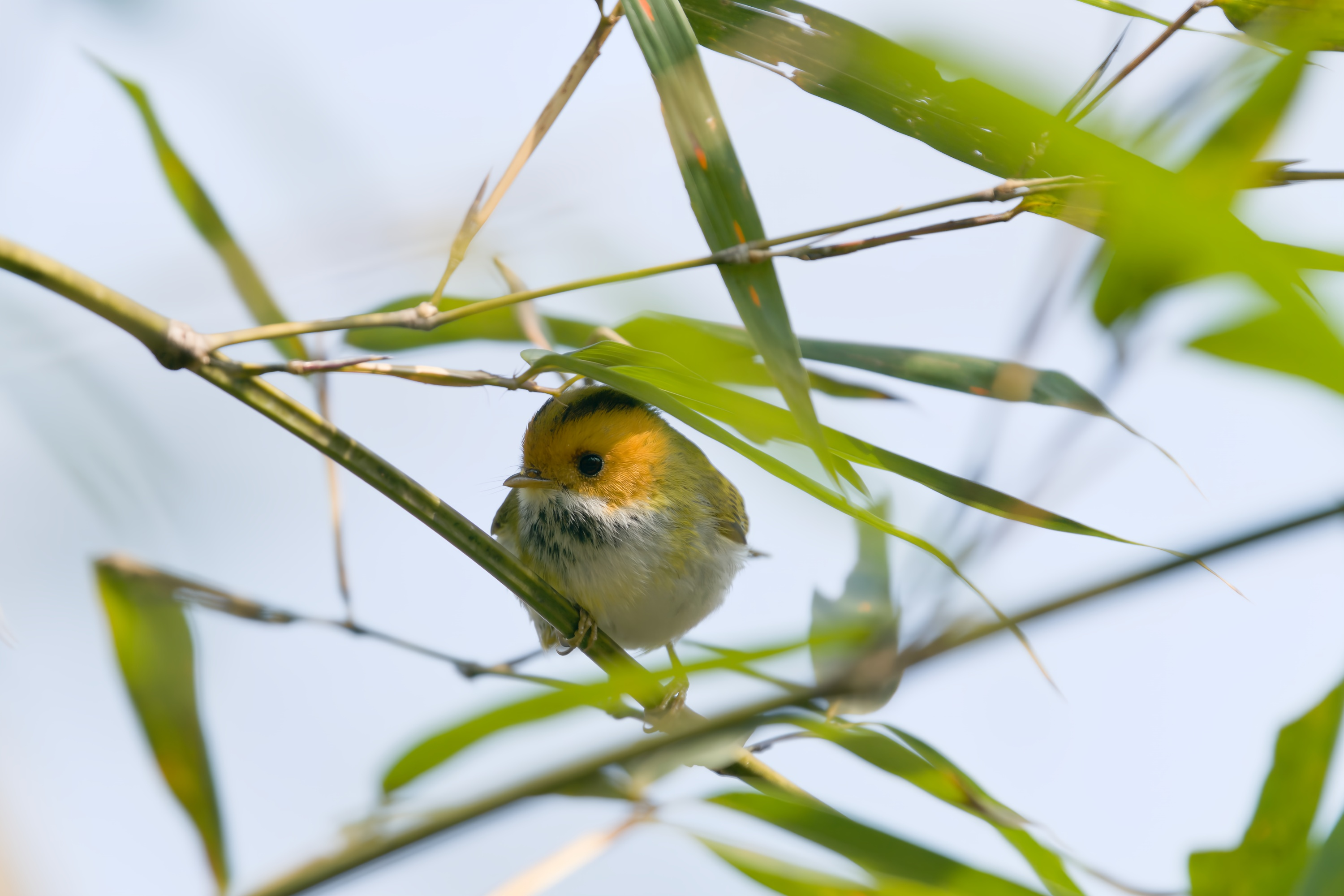
