= South Lhonak Lake =

Glacial-moraine-dammed lake

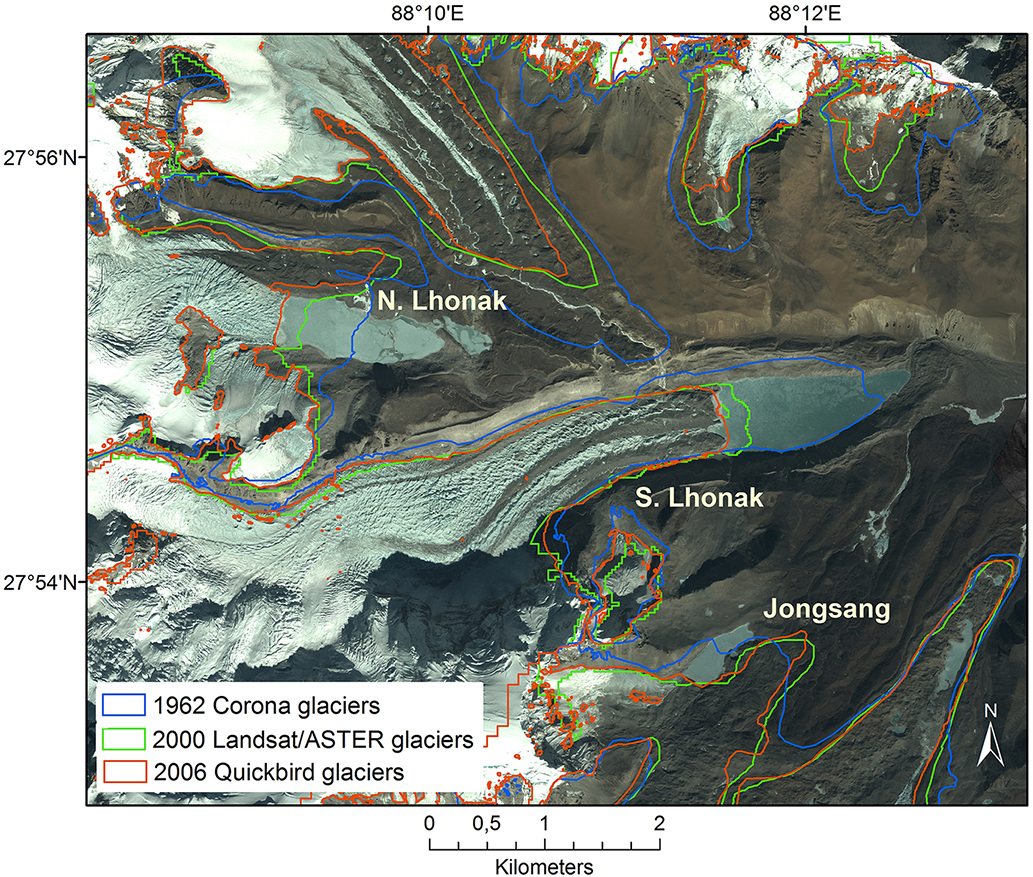
- From 1962 to 2006, a close-up view of changes in the glacier area surrounding the North and South Lhonak glaciers, highlighting changes in the proglacial lakes.
- Interactive map of South Lhonak Lake
- Coordinates: 27°54′51.95″N 88°11′00.91″E
- Type: Glacial, moraine-dammed
- Primary inflows: Lhonak Glacier
- Basin countries: India
- Max. length: 1.98 km (1.23 mi)
- Max. width: 0.45 km (0.28 mi)
- Surface area: 1.26 km^{2} (0.49 sq mi)
- Max. depth: 79.24 m (260.0 ft)
- Surface elevation: 5,200 m (17,100 ft)

South Lhonak Lake is a glacial-moraine-dammed lake, located in Sikkim's far northwestern region. It is one of the fastest expanding lakes in the Sikkim Himalaya region, and one of the 14 potentially dangerous lakes susceptible to Glacial lake outburst flood (GLOFs).

== Location ==
The lake is located at 5,200 m (17,100 ft) above sea level. It formed due to the melting of the Lhonak glacier.

=== Rapid growth ===
The lake is rapidly growing in size in an abnormally rapid manner due to the melting of the lake's associated South Lhonak glacier and additional melt water from the adjacent North Lhonak and main Lhonak glaciers.

According to the declassified CORONA data from 1962, which was then collected by the Central Intelligence Agency and the United States Air Force between 1960 and 1972 as a part of America's first space reconnaissance program, the lake first appeared as a supraglacial lake at the glacier's snout on November 24, 1962. The first occurrence of a separate lake was identified in the 1977 Landsat program's multispectral scanner (MSS) data. The lake's area was also traced using MSS data and the glacier's retreat. The lake had an area of 17.54 hectares in 1977 and was connected to the glacier terminal. Later, the lake's areal extent was determined using 1989, 2002, and 2008 temporal satellite data. Between 1977 and 2008, the lake's surface area rose by 81.1 hectares.

== 2023 outburst flood ==
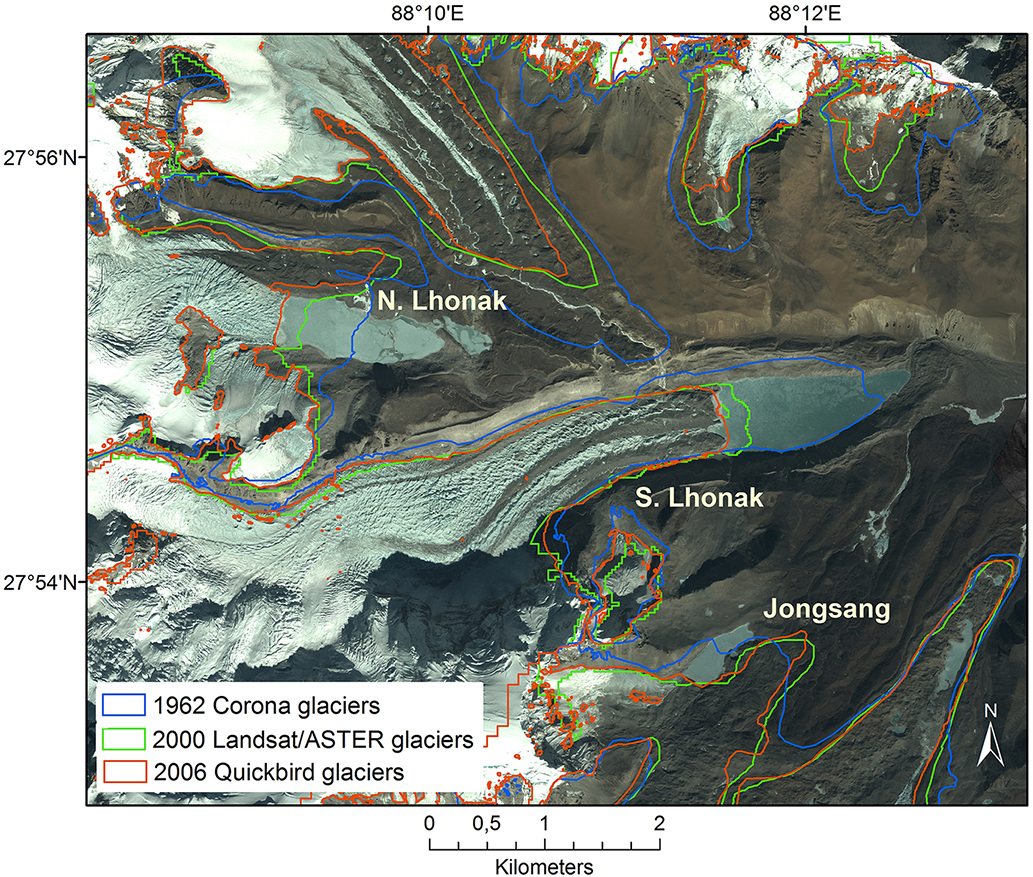

In October 2023, heavy rains caused massive landslide inside the lake due to which the water flow over the embankment and subsequently breach its embankments and cause a severe flood in the Teesta river basin, causing widespread property damage and killing at least 40 people.

== See also ==
- Lonak Glacier
