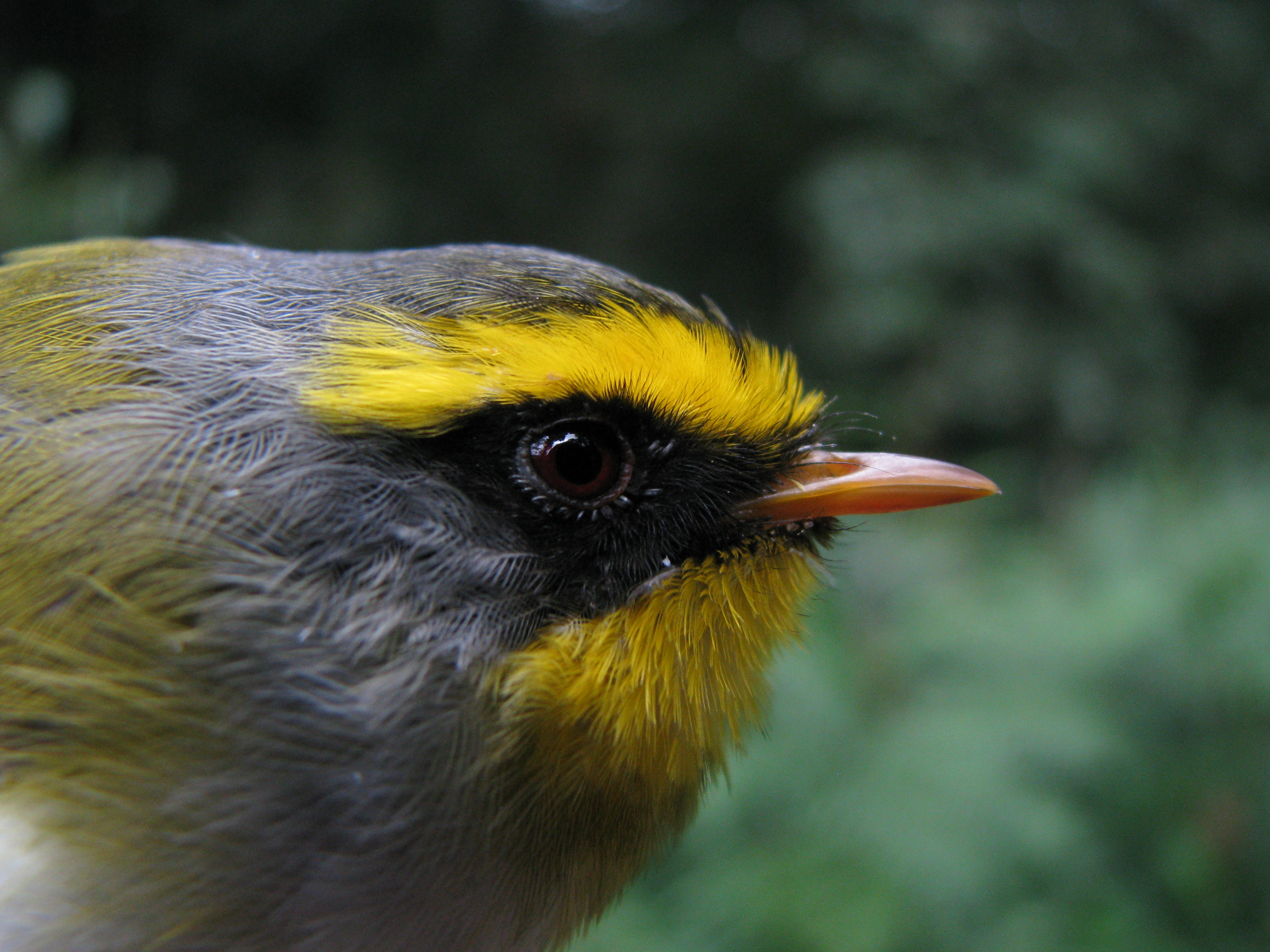
- Black-faced warbler (Abroscopus schisticeps)

Scientific classification
- Kingdom: Animalia
- Phylum: Chordata
- Class: Aves
- Order: Passeriformes
- Family: Cettiidae
- Genus: Abroscopus; Baker, 1930

Type species
- Abrornis superciliaris Blyth, 1859

Species
- Abroscopus albogularis Abroscopus schisticeps Abroscopus superciliaris

= Abroscopus =

Genus of birds

Abroscopus is a small genus of "warbler" in the family Cettiidae, formerly included in the Sylviidae.

== Species ==
It contains the following three species:

Image	Common name	Scientific name	Distribution
	Rufous-faced warbler	Abroscopus albogularis	Bangladesh, Bhutan, China, India, Laos, Myanmar, Nepal, Taiwan, Thailand, and Vietnam.
	Black-faced warbler	Abroscopus schisticeps	Bhutan, China, India, Myanmar, Nepal, and Vietnam.
	Yellow-bellied warbler	Abroscopus superciliaris	Bangladesh, Bhutan, Brunei, Cambodia, China, India, Indonesia, Laos, Malaysia, Myanmar, Nepal, Thailand, and Vietnam.
