= 1968 Sikkim floods =

Natural disaster in India

- Date: 2–5 October 1968
- Location: Sikkim and Darjeeling districts
- Deaths: ~1000

From 2 to 5 October 1968, there were four days of continuous rainfall in the region of Sikkim and Darjeeling. At its peak, during a 52-hours period, there was 1,000mm of rainfall. The rain caused hundreds of landslides. Houses and bridges were destroyed, including the known Anderson Bridge at the Teesta Bazaar. Road transport to Sikkim was disrupted because many parts of the highway to Sikkim were washed away. A total of around 1000 people were killed. The floods are regarded as one of the worst disasters of the region.
