= Teesta Low Dam - III Hydropower Plant =

Teesta Low Dam - III
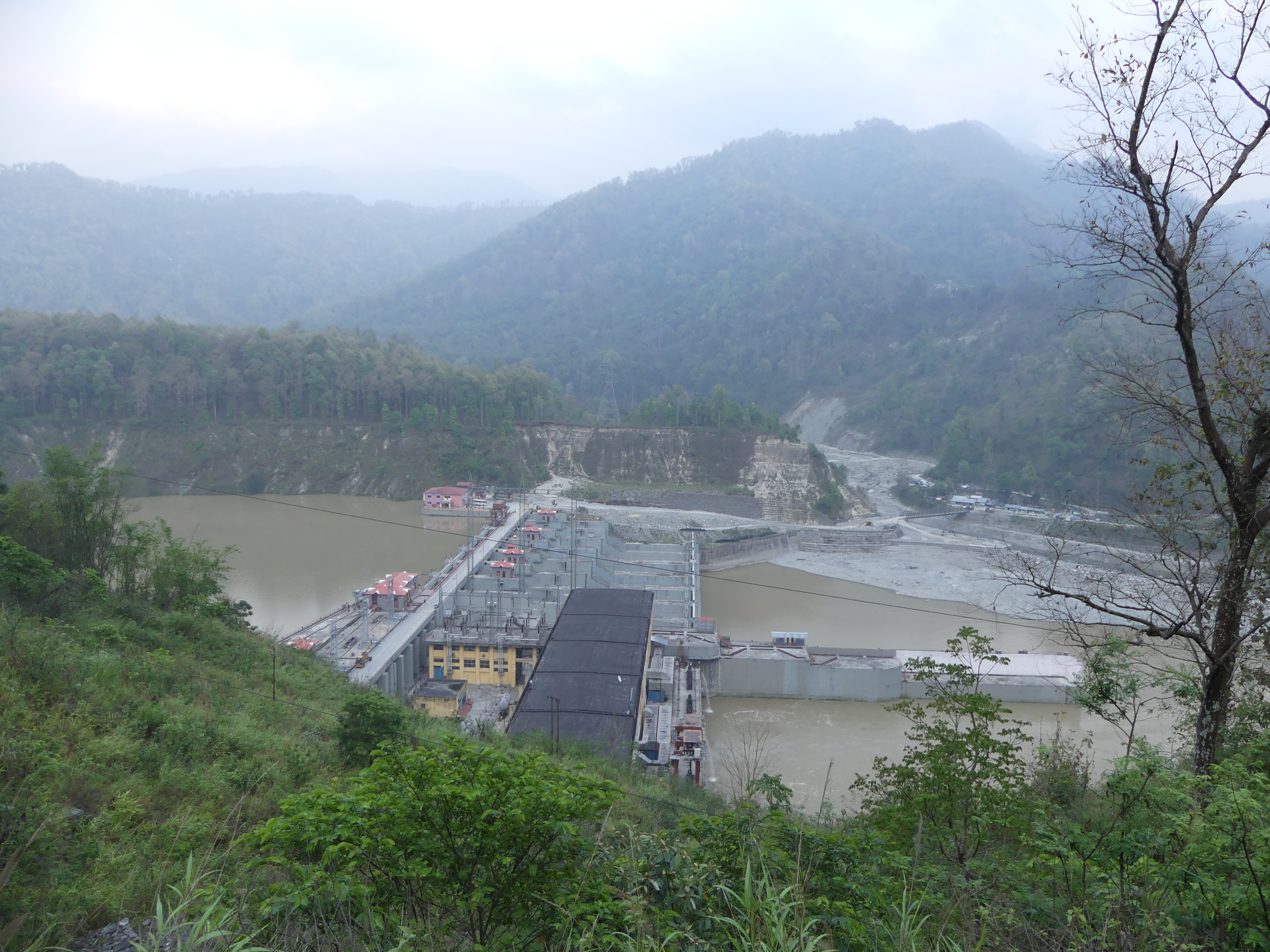

- Location within West Bengal Location within India
- Official name: Teesta Low Dam - III Power Station
- Country: India
- Location: Rambi Bazar, Kalimpong district, West Bengal
- Coordinates: 27.0018057°N 88.4404352°E
- Purpose: Power
- Status: Operational
- Opening date: 2013
- Construction cost: 768.92 Crores
- Owner: NHPC

Dam and spillways
- Impounds: Teesta River
- Height: 32 m (105 ft)
- Length: 144.5 m (474 ft)

Power Station
- Commission date: 2013
- Type: Run-of-the-river hydroelectric
- Hydraulic head: 21.34 m (70 ft)
- Turbines: 4 X 33 MW
- Installed capacity: 132 MW
- Annual generation: 594.07 million units

Teesta Low Dam - III Hydropower Plant is a run-of-the-river hydroelectric station built on the Teesta River. The Dam is located at Rambi Bazar, Kalimpong district, West Bengal.

== Geography ==
Places in the Kalimpong Sadar subdivision in Kalimpong district
CT: census town, R: rural/ urban centre, M: municipality, F: facility, NP: national park
Abbreviations used in names – TG for Tea Garden (town/village)
Owing to space constraints in the small map, the actual locations in a larger map may vary slightly

=== Location ===
It is located in Reang, Kalimpong district of West Bengal, a little above Rambi Bazar (see map alongside).

== The project ==
The project consists of a 32 m high dam with 4 penstocks of 44 m length and 7 m diameter each. The surface power house with installed capacity of 132 MW houses 4 units of 33 MW capacity each designed to operate under the net rated head of 21.34 M and designed to generate 594.07 million units in a 90% dependable year with 95% machine availability. Unit I & II were commissioned in the month of January 2013 and Unit III & IV in the month of February and March 2013 respectively. The state of West Bengal is the sole beneficiary of this power station. With the construction of the project the area is also benefited by development infrastructure, education, medical facilities and employment avenues.
