= Lonak Glacier =

Glacier in India

Lonak
- Location within Sikkim Location within India
- Interactive map of Lonak
- Type: Valley glacier
- Location: Sikkim
- Coordinates: 27°52′52″N 88°11′31″E

Lonak Glacier is one of the three major glaciers of Sikkim, in the Himalaya range in the north-east of India.

== See also ==
- Sikkim
- List of glaciers
