= Icche Gaon =

Village in West Bengal, India

Ichhe Gaon
- Village
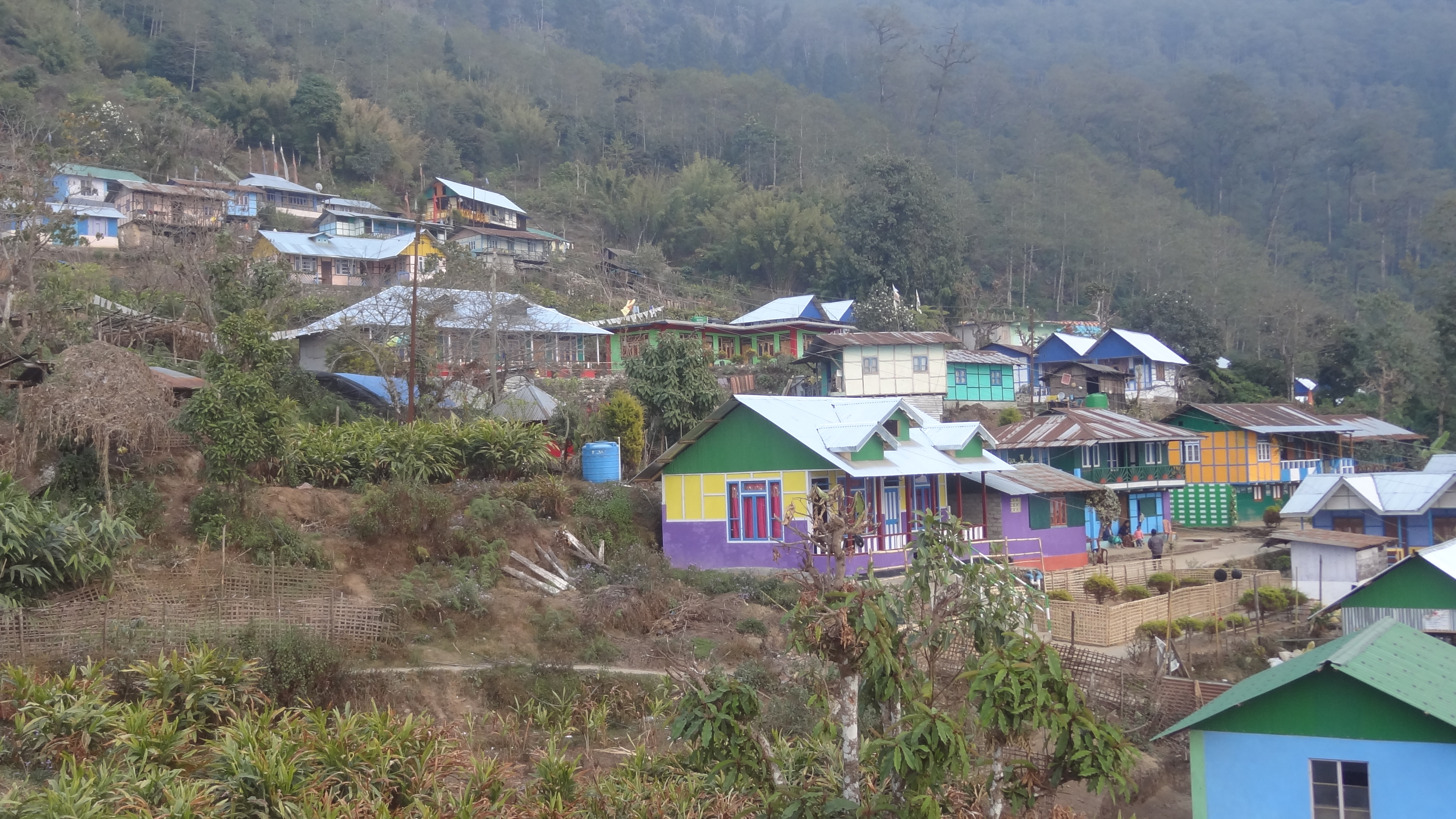
- Ichhe Gaon village

- Location in West Bengal, India Ichhe Gaon (India)
- Coordinates: 27°08′01″N 88°34′32″E
- Country: India
- State: West Bengal
- District: Kalimpong
- Time zone: UTC+5:30 (IST)
- Vehicle registration: WB
- Lok Sabha constituency: Darjeeling
- Vidhan Sabha constituency: Kalimpong
- Website: kalimpongdistrict.in

Icche Gaon or Echey Gaon is a village in the Kalimpong II CD block in the Kalimpong Sadar subdivision of the Kalimpong district of the state of West Bengal, India.

== Geography ==
Places in the Kalimpong Sadar subdivision in Kalimpong district
CT: census town, R: rural/ urban centre, M: municipality, F: facility, NP: national park
Abbreviations used in names – TG for Tea Garden (town/village)
Owing to space constraints in the small map, the actual locations in a larger map may vary slightly

=== Location ===
Icche Gaon is located at 27°08′01″N 88°34′32″E.

Icche Gaon, situated at 5800 ft above mean sea level, has a view of Mount Kangchenjunga and nearby peaks. Icche Gaon is located 89 km from New Jalpaiguri.

=== Area overview ===
The map alongside shows the Kalimpong Sadar subdivision of Kalimpong district. Physiographically, this area forms the Kalimpong Range, with the average elevation varying from 300 to 3,000 metres (980 to 9,840 ft). This region is characterized by abruptly rising hills and numerous small streams. It is a predominantly rural area with 77.67% of the population living in rural areas and only 22.23% living in the urban areas. While Kalimpong is the only municipality, Dungra is the sole census town in the entire area. The economy is agro-based and there are 6 tea gardens in the Gorubathan CD block. In 2011, Kalimpong subdivision had a literacy rate of 81.85%, comparable with the highest levels of literacy in the districts of the state. While the first degree college in the subdivision was established at Kalimpong in 1962 the entire subdivision (and now the entire district), other than the head-quarters, had to wait till as late as 2015 (more than half a century) to have their first degree colleges at Pedong and Gorubathan.

Note: The map alongside presents some of the notable locations in the subdivision. All places marked in the map are linked in the larger full screen map.

== Avi Flora and Fauna ==
In October, marigolds of varying colors are known to bloom on hills. Different types of ferns including tree fern and countless types of flowerless plants, mosses, algae, fungi, birches, orchids and among trees; oaks, pines, chestnuts, maples are seen here. Ichche Gaon is the home of varieties of birds like flycatchers, orioles, finches, sunbirds, woodpeckers, rufous sibia, emerald cuckoos, three-toed kingfisher and blue whistling thrush

== Tourism ==
Ichche Gaon is surrounded by several trekking routes. These routes lead toward viewpoints such as Ramitey Dara, Tinchuley, and Jalsa. Ramitey Dara offers a view of the Teesta River as it makes 14 turns through the valley. On a clear day, visitors can see Mt. Kanchenjunga along with towns in Sikkim, Jelep La, and Nathula from Tinchuley. Damsang Fort, the home of the Lepcha King Gyabo Achuk, is located 6 km from Icche Gaon and is a regional site. Another site is the Sangchen Dorjee Monastery, built around 300 years ago, which covers the history and culture of Pedong and the surrounding area. Rikisum is another viewpoint in the area. Located 15 km from Pedong Bazaar are the Reshi Bridge and Reshi Khola. The Rishi and Mudum Khola rivers merge to form Rishi Khola just before the bridge, making it a common destination for travelers.
