= Teesta Bazaar =

- Village
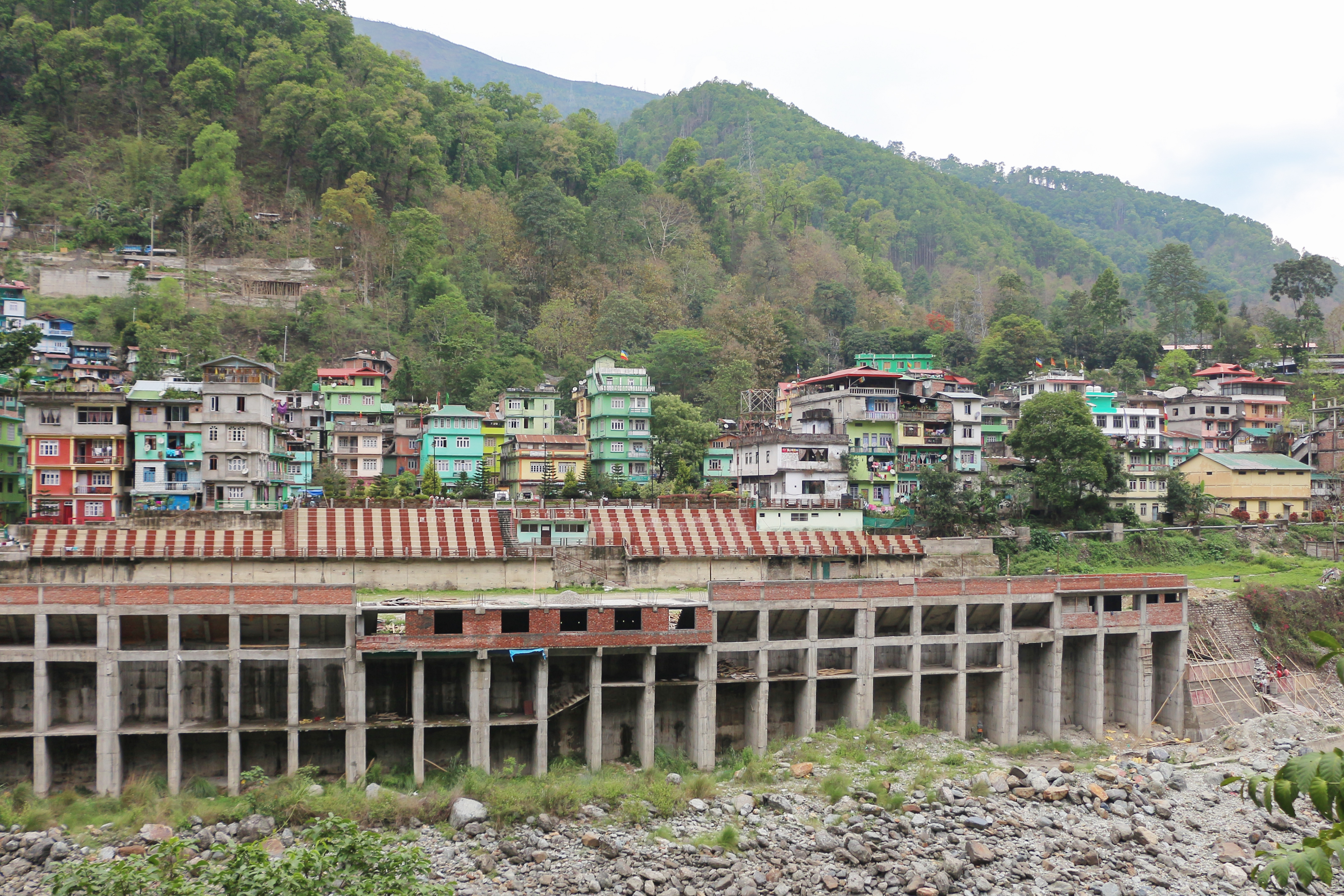
- View of Teesta Bazaar

- Location in West Bengal, India
- Coordinates: 27.06°N 88.43°E
- Country: India
- State: West Bengal
- District: Kalimpong

Population (2011)
  - Total: 2,953

Languages
- Time zone: UTC+5:30 (IST)
- Lok Sabha constituency: Darjeeling
- Vidhan Sabha constituency: Kalimpong
- Nearest Cities: Kalimpong, Siliguri, Darjeeling
- Website: kalimpongdistrict.in

Teesta Bazaar is a village located 4 km (2.5 mi) downstream from the town of Melli on the right bank of Teesta River in the Kalimpong I CD block in the Kalimpong subdivision of Kalimpong district of the state of West Bengal, India.

== Geography ==
Places in the Kalimpong Sadar subdivision in Kalimpong district
CT: census town, R: rural/ urban centre, M: municipality, F: facility, NP: national park
Abbreviations used in names – TG for Tea Garden (town/village)
Owing to space constraints in the small map, the actual locations in a larger map may vary slightly

=== Location ===
Teesta Bazaar is located at 27.06°N 88.43°E. Teesta Bazaar is situated at an elevation of 90 m (300 ft) above mean sea level. River rafting can be undertaken at this point. There are multiple organizations organizing river rafting for tourists. There are three distinct difficulty level starting from 3 km to 12 km where 3 km is meant for families and 8 or 12 km are meant for adventure sports. The rapids found is Teesta mostly ranges between Class I-III. The rafting was introduced by DGHC (Darjeeling Gorkha Hill Council, now GTA) in the year 1991. It is also at the point where the Teesta river flows into West Bengal. Most of the area around Teesta is patrolled by the Indian Army as it comes under a sensitive border area. The juncture where Teesta river meets Rangeet river is known as Triveni. Recently tourists have started frequenting this place for camping in tents and enjoy the pristine confluence of the two rivers.

=== Area overview ===
The map alongside shows the Kalimpong Sadar subdivision of Kalimpong district. Physiographically, this area forms the Kalimpong Range, with the average elevation varying from 300 to 3,000 metres (980 to 9,840 ft). This region is characterized by abruptly rising hills and numerous small streams. It is a predominantly rural area with 77.67% of the population living in rural areas and only 22.23% living in the urban areas. While Kalimpong is the only municipality, Dungra is the sole census town in the entire area. The economy is agro-based and there are six tea gardens in the Gorubathan CD block. In 2011, Kalimpong subdivision had a literacy rate of 81.85%, comparable with the highest levels of literacy in the districts of the state. While the first degree college in the subdivision was established at Kalimpong in 1962 the entire subdivision (and now the entire district), other than the head-quarters, had to wait till as late as 2015 (more than half a century) to have their first degree colleges at Pedong and Gorubathan.

Note: The map alongside presents some of the notable locations in the subdivision. All places marked in the map are linked in the larger full screen map.

== Transport ==
It is a road junction on the Siliguri-Gangtok National Highway 10 and the State Highway 12 with links to both Darjeeling and Kalimpong. The National Highway 10 crosses Teesta River here. Darjeeling is on the west of the river and Kalimpong is on the east of the river. Leaving NH 10 and continuing upriver on the right bank from Siliguri on a narrower road, the smaller road leads to Darjeeling towards the west. Continuing on NH 10 on the left bank of the river after crossing the bridge, the road towards Kalimpong takes off at a junction 3 km (1.9 mi) ahead of the bridge.

Tista Bazaar Underground Railway Station lies on the under construction Sevoke-Rangpo Railway Line. of Northeast Frontier Railway.

== 2023 Sikkim flash floods ==
Main article 2023 Sikkim flash floods

Teesta Bazaar was hardly hit by the Glacial lake outburst flood (GLOF) of Teesta river due to cloudburst at South Lhonak Lake in North Sikkim.

== Demographics ==
According to the 2011 Census of India, Tista Bazar DIF had a total population of 2,953 of which 1,530 (52%) were males and 1,423 (48%) were females. There were 327 persons in the age range of 0 to 6 years. The total number of literate people in Tista Bazar DIF was 2,053 (78.18% of the population over 6 years).

== Healthcare ==
There is a primary health centre, with 10 beds, at Teesta Bazaar.
