= Sillery Gaon =

- Village
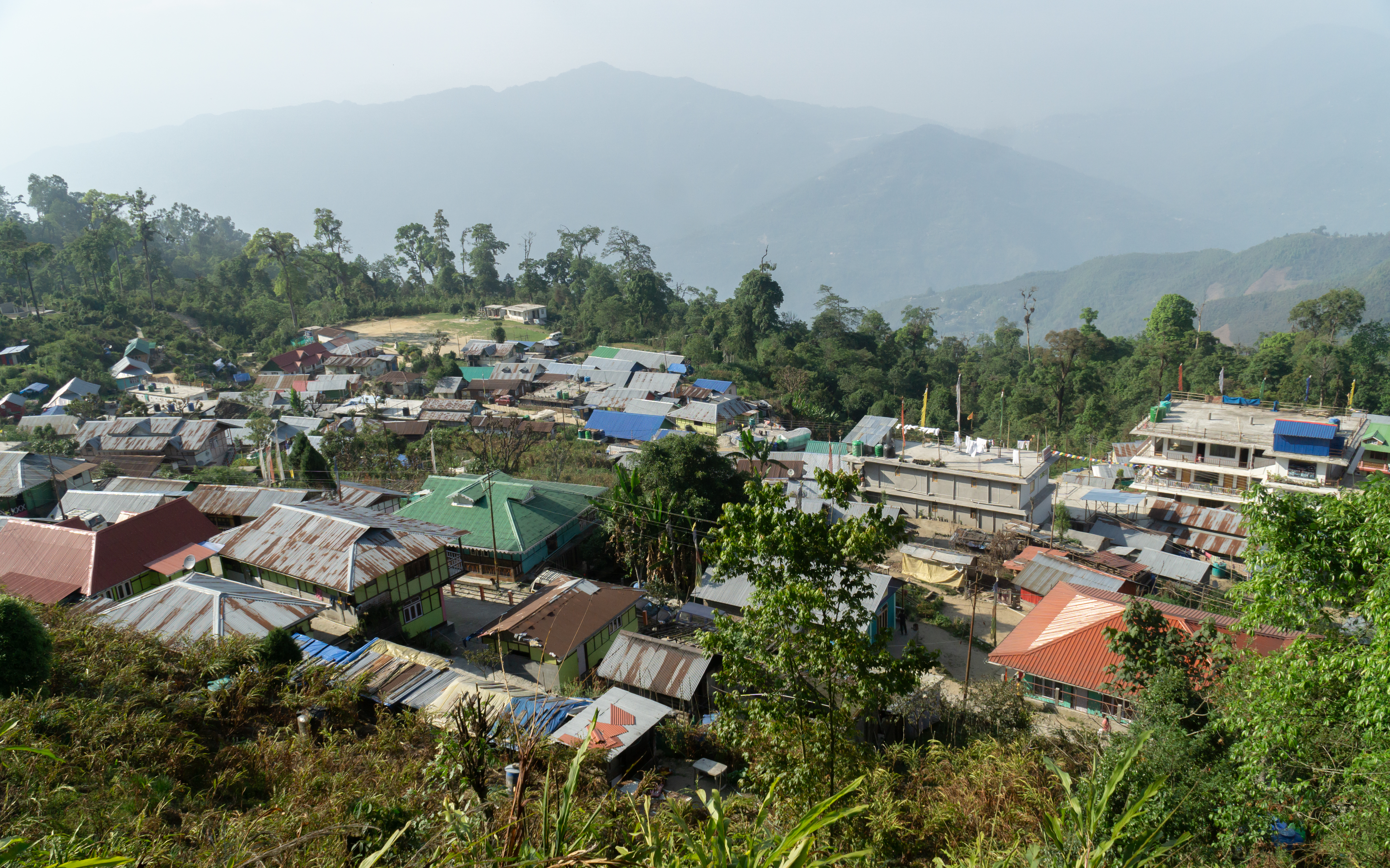

- Location in West Bengal, India Sillery Gaon (India)
- Coordinates: 27.14°N 88.58°E
- Country: India
- State: West Bengal
- District: Kalimpong
- Time zone: UTC+5:30 (IST)
- Vehicle registration: WB
- Lok Sabha constituency: Darjeeling
- Vidhan Sabha constituency: Kalimpong
- Website: kalimpongdistrict.in

Sillery Gaon is a village in the Kalimpong II CD block in the Kalimpong Sadar subdivision of the Kalimpong district in the state of West Bengal, India.

== Etymology ==
There are many myths and legends associated with the name Sillery. It is said to be a portmanteau derived from the word sillery, which is a plant that grows in abundance in the region.

== Geography ==
Places in the Kalimpong Sadar subdivision in Kalimpong district
CT: census town, R: rural/ urban centre, M: municipality, F: facility, NP: national park
Abbreviations used in names – TG for tea garden (town/village)
Owing to space constraints in the small map, the actual locations in a larger map may vary slightly

=== Location ===
Sillery Gaon is located at 27.14°N 88.58°E.

Sillery Gaon is situated at an altitude of 6000 ft. The area offers views of the Mt. Kangchenjunga and its allied peaks and the Teesta River. This area also abounds in cinchona plantation, which was introduced in the region by the British as a source of quinine used for the treatment of malaria.

An attraction for tourists visiting Sillery Gaon is Sangchen Dorjee Monastery, which was built during the Bhutanese rule in Pedong.

=== Area overview ===
The map above shows the Kalimpong Sadar subdivision of Kalimpong district. Physiographically, this area forms the Kalimpong Range, with the average elevation varying from 300 to 3,000 metres (980 to 9,840 ft). This region is characterized by abruptly rising hills and numerous small streams. It is a predominantly rural area with 77.67% of the population living in rural areas and only 22.23% living in the urban areas. While Kalimpong is the only municipality, Dungra is the sole census town in the entire area. The economy is agro-based and there are 6 tea gardens in the Gorubathan CD block. In 2011, Kalimpong subdivision had a literacy rate of 81.85%, comparable with the highest levels of literacy in the districts of the state. While the first degree college in the subdivision was established at Kalimpong in 1962 the entire subdivision (and now the entire district), other than the head-quarters, had to wait until as late as 2015 (more than half a century) to have their first degree colleges at Pedong and Gorubathan.

Note: The map alongside presents some of the notable locations in the subdivision. All places marked in the map are linked in the larger full screen map.

== Transport ==
Sillery Gaon can be reached by a motorable road from Pedong.
