= Nimbong =

Nimbong Nimbong Khasmahal
- Village
- Location in West Bengal, India Nimbong (India)
- Coordinates: 26.974194°N 88.590694°E
- Country: India
- State: West Bengal
- District: Kalimpong

Population (2011)
  - Total: 2,659
- Time zone: UTC+5:30 (IST)
- PIN: 734314
- Vehicle registration: WB
- Lok Sabha constituency: Darjeeling
- Vidhan Sabha constituency: Kalimpong
- Website: kalimpongdistrict.in

Nimbong (also referred to as Nimbong Khasmahal) is a village lying on National Highway 717A in the Kalimpong I CD block in the Kalimpong Sadar subdivision of the Kalimpong district in the state of West Bengal, India. The nearest railway station is Bagrakote railway station.

== Geography ==
Places in the Kalimpong Sadar subdivision in Kalimpong district
CT: census town, R: rural/ urban centre, M: municipality, F: facility, NP: national park
Abbreviations used in names – TG for Tea Garden (town/village)
Owing to space constraints in the small map, the actual locations in a larger map may vary slightly

=== Location ===
Nimbong is located at 26.974194°N 88.590694°E.

Nimbong is 78 km from Siliguri and 71 km from Kalimpong. It is at an altitude of 5,000 feet (1,500 m). Winters can be severely cold but there is normally no snowfall. During the monsoons, the roads get muddy and there are possibilities of landslides.

=== Area overview ===
The map alongside shows the Kalimpong Sadar subdivision of Kalimpong district. Physiographically, this area forms the Kalimpong Range, with the average elevation varying from 300 to 3,000 metres (980 to 9,840 ft). This region is characterized by abruptly rising hills and numerous small streams. It is a predominantly rural area with 77.67% of the population living in rural areas and only 22.23% living in the urban areas. While Kalimpong is the only municipality, Dungra is the sole census town in the entire area. The economy is agro-based and there are 6 tea gardens in the Gorubathan CD block. In 2011, Kalimpong subdivision had a literacy rate of 81.85%, comparable with the highest levels of literacy in the districts of the state. While the first degree college in the subdivision was established at Kalimpong in 1962 the entire subdivision (and now the entire district), other than the head-quarters, had to wait till as late as 2015 (more than half a century) to have their first degree colleges at Pedong and Gorubathan.

Note: The map alongside presents some of the notable locations in the subdivision. All places marked in the map are linked in the larger full screen map.

== Demographics ==
According to the 2011 Census of India, Nimbong Khasmahal had a total population of 2,659 of which 1,368 (51%) were males and 1,291 (49%) were females. There were 311 persons in the age range of 0 to 6 years. The total number of literate people in Nimbong Khasmahal was 1,661 (70.74% of the population over 6 years).

== Tourism ==
Nimbong is a quiet destination with many potential tourist attractions: from snow clad Himalayan ranges to untouched forests and hills all around. There is a variety of food and lodging amenities ranging from modern facilities to homestays.
