= Kalimpong II =

- Community development block
- Coordinates: 27.120°N 88.593°E
- Country: India
- State: West Bengal
- District: Kalimpong

Government
  - Type: Community development block

Area
  - Total: 241.26 km^{2} (93.15 sq mi)

Population (2011)
  - Total: 66,830
  - Density: 277.0/km^{2} (717.4/sq mi)
- Time zone: UTC+5:30 (IST)
- Lok Sabha constituency: Darjeeling
- Vidhan Sabha constituency: Kalimpong

Kalimpong II was a community development block (CD block) that forms an administrative division in the Kalimpong subdivision of the Kalimpong district in the Indian state of West Bengal.

In July 2021, the Kalimpong II block was bifurcated into two blocks – Pedong block with headquarters at Pedong and the Lava block with headquarters at Algarah.

== Geography ==
Algarah is located at 27°07′12″N 88°35′35″E.

The snow-clad mountain ranges, a little to the north of the old Darjeeling district, form the main Himalayan range. Ranges/ ridges branching out from the main Himalayas pass through Darjeeling district. To the north-west towers the giant Kangchenjunga 28,146 ft (8,579 m) and to the north-east is Dongkya 23,184 ft (7,066 m). From Kangchenjunga the Singalila Ridge slopes down southward forming the border between India and Nepal. Manebhanjyang, Sandakphu and Phalut are popular trekking destinations on this ridge. It continues south and south-east through Tunglu and Senchal and other spurs that form the Darjeeling Hills west of the Teesta. To the east of the Teesta, a lofty ridge runs south of Dongkya, bifurcating at Gipmochi 11,518 ft (3,511 m), forming two spurs that contain the valley of the Jaldhaka. The lower portion of this hilly region forms the Kalimpong Hills. Four great hill ranges radiate from a single point at Ghum, a saddle 7,372 ft (2,247 m) high – the first, the Ghum range running due west to Simanabasti; the second, the Senchal-Mahaldiram range sloping south towards Kurseong, the highest points being East Senchel 8,600 ft (2,600 m), Tiger Hill 8,515 ft (2,595 m) and West Senchel 8,163 ft (2,488 m); the third, the Takdah or Takbu range, sloping north-east to a point above the junction of the Great Rangit and Teesta; the fourth, the Darjeeling Jalapahar Range, extending northwards towards Darjeeling.

Kalimpong II CD block is part of the Kalimpong Range physiographic region. The average elevation varies from 300 m to 3,000 m above sea level. “This region is characterised by abruptly rising hills and numerous small river streams coming down in the north-south direction.”

Kalimpong II CD block is bounded by the East Sikkim district of Sikkim on the north, Gorubathan CD block on the east and south, Kalimpong I CD blocks on the south and west.

The Kalimpong II CD block has an area of 241.26 km^{2}. It has 1 panchayat samity, 13 gram panchayats, 92 gram sansads (village councils), 39 mouzas and 33 inhabited villages. Jaldhaka police station serves this block Headquarters of this CD block is at Algarah Bazar.

Gram panchayats in Kalimpong II CD block are: Dalapchand, Gitabling, Kage, Kashyong, Lava-Gitabeyong, Lingseykha, Lole, Payong, Pedon, Shangshe, Shantuk and Siyakiyong.

== Demographics ==
=== Population ===
According to the 2011 Census of India, the Kalimpong II CD block had a total population of 66,830, all of which were rural. There were 34,546 (52%) males and 32,284 (48%) females. There were 7,193 persons in the age range of 0 to 6 years. The Scheduled Castes numbered 1,961 (2.93%) and the Scheduled Tribes numbered 24,773 (37.07%).

Large villages (with 4,000+ population) in the Kalimpong II CD block are (2011 census figures in brackets): Mansong Chincona Plantation (8,812), Pedong Khasmahal (4,274), Sakiyong Khasmahal (5,753) and Paiyong Khamahal (6,423).

Other villages in the Kalimpong II CD block include (2011 census figures in brackets): Dalapachan Khasmahal (2549), Git Dubling Khasmahal (3,598), Kagey Khasmahal (2,401), Lava Bazar DIF (1,836), Git Beyond Khasmahal (2,464), Lingsaykha Khasmahal (2,278), Lolay Khasmahal (2,209), Sangsher Khasmahal (3,516) and Algarah Bazar DIF (1,957).

=== Literacy ===
According to the 2011 census the total number of literate persons in the Kalimpog II CD block was 47,520 (79.68% of the population over 6 years) out of which males numbered 26,380 (85.58% of the male population over 6 years) and females numbered 21,140 (73.37% of the female population over 6 years). The gender disparity (the difference between female and male literacy rates) was 12.20%.

See also – List of West Bengal districts ranked by literacy rate

Literacy in CD blocks of
Darjeeling district (2011)
Darjeeling Sadar subdivision
Darjeeling Pulbazar – 80.78%
Rangli Rangliot – 80.50%
Jorebunglow Sukhiapokhri – 82.54%
Kalimpong subdivision
Kalimpong I – 81.43%
Kalimpong II – 79.68%
Gorubathan – 76.88%
Kurseong subdivision
Kurseong – 81.15%
Mirik subdivision
Mirik – 80.84%
Siliguri subdivision
Matigara – 74.78%
Naxalbari – 75.47%
Phansidewa – 64.46%
Kharibari – 67.37%
2011 Census: CD Block Wise

Primary Census Abstract Data

=== Language and religion ===
Religion in Kalimpong II CD block (2011)
Hinduism	53.85%
Buddhism	26.43%
Christian	16.51%
Kirat Mundhum	1.86%
Islam	1.07%
Other or not stated	0.28%

In the 2011 census, Hindus numbered 35,989 and formed 53.85% of the population in the Kalimpong II CD block. Buddhists numbered 17,660 and formed 26.43% of the population. Christians numbered 11,034 and formed 16.51% of the population. Muslims numbered 715 and formed 1.07% of the population. Others numbered 1,432 and formed 2.14% of the population.

Languages of Kalimpong II CD block (2011)
1. Nepali (92.5%)
2. Lepcha (2.90%)
3. Hindi (1.30%)
4. Bhotia (1.07%)
5. Others (2.28%)

At the time of the 2011 census, 92.45% of the population spoke Nepali, 2.90% Lepcha, 1.30% Hindi and 1.07% Bhotia as their first language.

The West Bengal Official Language Act 1961 declared that Bengali and Nepali were to be used for official purposes in the three hill subdivisions of Darjeeling, Kalimpong and Kurseong in Darjeeling district.

== Rural poverty ==
According to the Rural Household Survey in 2005, 24.40% of the total number of families were BPL families in the Darjeeling district. According to a World Bank report, as of 2012, 4-9% of the population in Darjeeling, North 24 Parganas and South 24 Parganas districts were below poverty level, the lowest among the districts of West Bengal, which had an average 20% of the population below poverty line.

== Economy ==
=== Livelihood ===
Livelihood
in Kalimpong II CD block
1. Cultivators (42.6%)
2. Agricultural labourers (19.4%)
3. Household industries (1.05%)
4. Other Workers (37.0%)

In the Kalimpong II CD block in 2011, among the class of total workers, cultivators numbered 10,741 and formed 42.57%, agricultural labourers numbered 4,887 and formed 19.37%, household industry workers numbered 266 and formed 1.05% and other workers numbered 9,335 and formed 37.00%. Total workers numbered 25,229 and formed 37.75% of the total population, and non-workers numbered 41,601 and formed 62.25% of the population.

Note: In the census records a person is considered a cultivator, if the person is engaged in cultivation/ supervision of land owned by self/government/institution. When a person who works on another person's land for wages in cash or kind or share, is regarded as an agricultural labourer. Household industry is defined as an industry conducted by one or more members of the family within the household or village, and one that does not qualify for registration as a factory under the Factories Act. Other workers are persons engaged in some economic activity other than cultivators, agricultural labourers and household workers. It includes factory, mining, plantation, transport and office workers, those engaged in business and commerce, teachers, entertainment artistes and so on.

=== Infrastructure ===
There are 33 inhabited villages in the Kalimpong II CD block, as per the District Census Handbook, Darjiling, 2011. 100% villages have power supply. 100% villages have drinking water supply. 13 villages (39.39%) have post offices. 26 villages (78.79%) have telephones (including landlines, public call offices and mobile phones). 18 villages (54.55%) have pucca (paved) approach roads and 3 villages (9.09%) have transport communication (includes bus service, rail facility and navigable waterways). 8 villages (24.24%) have agricultural credit societies and 7 villages (21.21%) have banks.

=== Agriculture ===
In 2012–13, there were 1 fertiliser depot, 1 seed store and 44 fair price shops in Kalimpong II CD block.

In 2013–14, Kalimpong II CD block produced 3,799 tonnes of Aman paddy, the main winter crop, from 1,754 hectares, 67 tonnes of wheat from 59 hectares, 8,462 tonnes of maize from 4,071 hectares and 4,848 tonnes of potatoes from 473 hectares. It also produced some oilseeds.

=== Tea gardens ===
Darjeeling tea “received the iconic status due to its significant aroma, taste and colour… the first Indian product to be marked with the Geographical Indication (GI) tag in 2003… As per the definition, “Darjeeling Tea” can only refer to tea that has been cultivated, grown, produced, manufactured and processed in tea gardens in few specific hilly areas of the district.” Apart from the hill areas, tea is also grown in the plain areas of the terai and dooars, but such gardens are not covered under the GI tag.

As of 2009–10, there were 87 tea gardens covered under the GI tag, employing 51,091 persons. Total land under cultivation was 17,828.38 hectares and total production was 7.36 million kg. A much larger population is indirectly dependent on the tea industry in the district. The average annual production including those from the plain areas, exceeds 10 million kg.

As of 2013, Darjeeling subdivision had 46 tea estates, Kalimpong subdivision had 29 tea estates and Kurseong subdivision had 6 tea gardens. This added up to 81 tea estates in the hill areas. Bannackburn Tea Estate and Lingia Tea Estate in Darjeeling were the first to come up in 1835. Siliguri subdivision in the terai region had 45 tea estates.

=== Banking ===
In 2012–13, Kalimpong Ii CD block had offices of 3 commercial banks and 2 gramin banks.

== Transport ==
Kalimpong II CD block has 3 originating/ terminating bus routes. The nearest railway station is 64 km from the block headquarters.

National Highway 717A and State Highway 12 passes through Kalimpong II CD block.

== Education ==
In 2012–13, Kalimpong II CD block had 92 primary schools with 9,822 students, 6 middle schools with 1,068 students, 7 high schools with 2,703 students and 3 higher secondary schools with 1,727 students. Kalimpong II CD block had 207 institutions for special and non-formal education with 6,438 students.

See also – Education in India

According to the 2011 census, in Kalimpong II CD block, among the 33 inhabited villages, 8 villages did not have a school, 20 villages had two or more primary schools, 14 villages had at least 1 primary and 1 middle school and 13 villages had at least 1 middle and 1 secondary school.

Government General Degree College, Pedong, was established in 2015 at Pedong. It offers undergraduate courses in arts and science.

== Healthcare ==
In 2013, Kalimpong II CD block had 1 rural hospital and 2 primary health centres with total 38 beds and 4 doctors (excluding private bodies). It had 17 family welfare subcentres. 850 patients were treated indoor and 13,543 patients were treated outdoor in the hospitals, health centres and subcentres of the CD block.

Pedong Rural Hospital, with 30 beds at Pedong, is the major government medical facility in the Kalimpong II CD block. There are primary health centres at Gitdubling (with 6 beds) and Algarah (with 2 beds).
