= Algarah =

Algarah Algarah Bazar
- Town
- Location in West Bengal, India
- Coordinates: 27.1178°N 88.5836°E
- Country: India
- State: West Bengal
- District: Kalimpong
- Elevation: 1,780 m (5,840 ft)

Population (2011)
  - Total: 1,957

Languages
  - Official: Nepali, Bengali, English,
- Time zone: UTC+5:30 (IST)
- PIN: 734 314
- Telephone code: 03552
- Vehicle registration: WB-78, 79
- Nearest city: Kalimpong
- Website: kalimpongdistrict.in

Algarah (also known as Algarah Bazar) is a town in Lava CD block in the Kalimpong subdivision of the Kalimpong district of West Bengal, India. The town lies on National Highway-717A connecting Bagrakote to Gangtok.

== Geography ==
Places in the Kalimpong subdivision (Kalimpong district)
CT: census town, R: rural/ urban centre, M: municipality, F: facility, NP: national park
Abbreviations used in names – TG for Tea Garden (town/village)
Owing to space constraints in the small map, the actual locations in a larger map may vary slightly

=== Location ===
Algarah is located at 27.1178°N 88.5836°E

It is located at a distance of 15 km east of Kalimpong town on the way to Lava at an elevation of 1,780 m (5,840 ft). It has a population of about 3,000. Algarah lies on the historical Indo-Tibetan trade route via the Jelepla Pass.

=== Area overview ===
The map alongside shows the Kalimpong subdivision, the sole subdivision of the Kalimpong district. Physiographically, this area forms the Kalimpong Range, with the average elevation varying from 300 to 3,000 metres (980 to 9,840 ft). This region is characterized by abruptly rising hills and numerous small streams. It is a predominantly rural area with 77.67% of the population living in rural areas and only 22.23% living in the urban areas. While Kalimpong is the only municipality, Dungra is the sole census town in the entire area. The economy is agro-based and there are 6 tea gardens in the Gorubathan CD block. In 2011, Kalimpong subdivision had a literacy rate of 81.85%, comparable with the highest levels of literacy in the districts of the state. While the first degree college in the subdivision was established at Kalimpong in 1962 the entire subdivision (and now the entire district), other than the head-quarters, had to wait till as late as 2015 (more than half a century) to have their first degree colleges at Pedong and Gorubathan.

Note: The map alongside presents some of the notable locations in the subdivision. All places marked in the map are linked in the larger full screen map.

== Demographics ==
According to the 2011 Census of India, Algarah Bazer DIF had a total population of 1,957 of which 982 (50%) were males and 975 (50%) were females. There were 182 persons in the age range of 0 to 6 years. The total number of literate people in Algarah Bazer DIF was 1,449 (81.63% of the population over 6 years).

== Civic administration ==
=== CD block HQ ===
Headquarters of Lava CD block is at Algarah Bazar.

== History ==
Algarah is famous for the remains of the ancient Damsang Gadi (Damsang Fort). It is said that the Lepcha king Gaeboo Achyuk (Gyalpo Ajok; Wylie: rgyal po a 'lcog) built this fort in 1690 with the help of spirits who brought big round smooth stones from the Reshi river. And the remnants of the fort still exist. There have been many stories passed from generation to generation about King Achyuk. It was believed that he used to possess some kind of supernatural powers. There are stories about some hidden treasures guarded by some kind of supernatural forces and also tunnels built by Achyuk. The fort was initially built to fight the Drukpas of Bhutan. There are many myths about Drukpas fearing to visit the place as it was believed that King Gaeboo Achyuk was killed by the Bhutanese by forgery. It is believed that any Drukpa visiting that place will be struck to death due to some supernatural force.

The fort was later used to ward off the forces of the British East India Company. It into ruin after the 1864 Anglo-Bhutan War. Every year on 20 December, Lepchas from all the adjoining regions (Kalimpong, Darjeeling, Sikkim) come to Damsang Fort to celebrate the birthday of King Gaeboo Achyuk and to attend some auspicious rituals that is followed from generation to generation by the Lepcha tribes.

== Healthcare ==
There is a primary health centre, with 2 beds, at Algarah.

== Transport ==
As Algarah lies on the National Highway-717A connecting Bagrakote to Gangtok which is extended by NHIDCL. Taxis, Jeeps, Buses etc. are available from Algarah to cities and towns like Kalimpong, Pedong, Rhenock, Labha, Rongli, Gorubathan, Siliguri etc. Three important road network meets at Algarah, Rhenock- Resi- Kalimpong Road, Algarah- Labha- Gorubathan Road and Rangpo- Munsoong- Pedong road.

Pakyong Airport is 55 kilometres away from the town, and Bagdogra International Airport is 92 kilometres away. The nearest railway station is Malbazar Junction.
