= Loleygaon =

- Village
- Location in West Bengal, India Loleygaon (India)
- Coordinates: 27.02071°N 88.565018°E
- Country: India
- State: West Bengal
- District: Kalimpong

Population (2011)
  - Total: 2,209

Languages
  - Official: Nepali, Bengali, English
- Time zone: UTC+5:30 (IST)
- ISO 3166 code: IN-WB
- Website: kalimpongdistrict.in

Loleygaon (also spelt Lolaegaon or Lolegaon) is a village lying on NH 717A in the Kalimpong II CD block in the Kalimpong Sadar subdivision of the Kalimpong district in the Indian state of West Bengal.

== Geography ==
Places in the Kalimpong Sadar subdivision in Kalimpong district
CT: census town, R: rural/ urban centre, M: municipality, F: facility, NP: national park
Abbreviations used in names – TG for Tea Garden (town/village)
Owing to space constraints in the small map, the actual locations in a larger map may vary slightly

=== Location ===
Loleygaon is located at 27.02071°N 88.565018°E.

Loleygaon is a Lepcha village situated in the extreme end of a Himalayan ridge. It is located at a distance of 24 km from Lava, at an altitude of 1,675 meters. It comes under the Kalimpong district of West Bengal.

=== Area overview ===
The map alongside shows the Kalimpong Sadar subdivision of Kalimpong district. Physiographically, this area forms the Kalimpong Range, with the average elevation varying from 300 to 3,000 metres (980 to 9,840 ft). This region is characterised by abruptly rising hills and numerous small streams. It is a predominantly rural area with 77.67% of the population living in rural areas and only 22.23% living in the urban areas. While Kalimpong is the only municipality, Dungra is the sole census town in the entire area. The economy is agro-based and there are 6 tea gardens in the Gorubathan CD block. In 2011, Kalimpong subdivision had a literacy rate of 81.85%, comparable with the highest levels of literacy in the districts of the state. While the first degree college in the subdivision was established at Kalimpong in 1962 the entire subdivision (and now the entire district), other than the head-quarters, had to wait till as late as 2015 (more than half a century) to have their first degree colleges at Pedong and Gorubathan.

Note: The map alongside presents some of the notable locations in the subdivision. All places marked in the map are linked in the larger full screen map.

== Demographics ==
According to the 2011 Census of India, Lolay Khasmahal had a total population of 2,209 of which 1,142 (52%) were males and 1,064 (48%) were females. There were 240 persons in the age range of 0 to 6 years. The total number of literate people in Lolay Khasmahal was 1,584 (80.45% of the population over 6 years).

== Transport ==
Loleygaon can be reached from Siliguri with a four-hour drive covering 124 km via Kalimpong and Lava. Kalimpong, the nearest town, is 55 km from Loleygaon.

== Tourism ==
Kafer, about 1 km from Loleygaon, offers a panoramic view of the Kanchenjunga. The sunrise can be viewed from Jhandi Dara. Other notable site includes Canopy Walk.
