= Bagrakote railway station =

Railway station in West Bengal

Bagrakote Railway Station
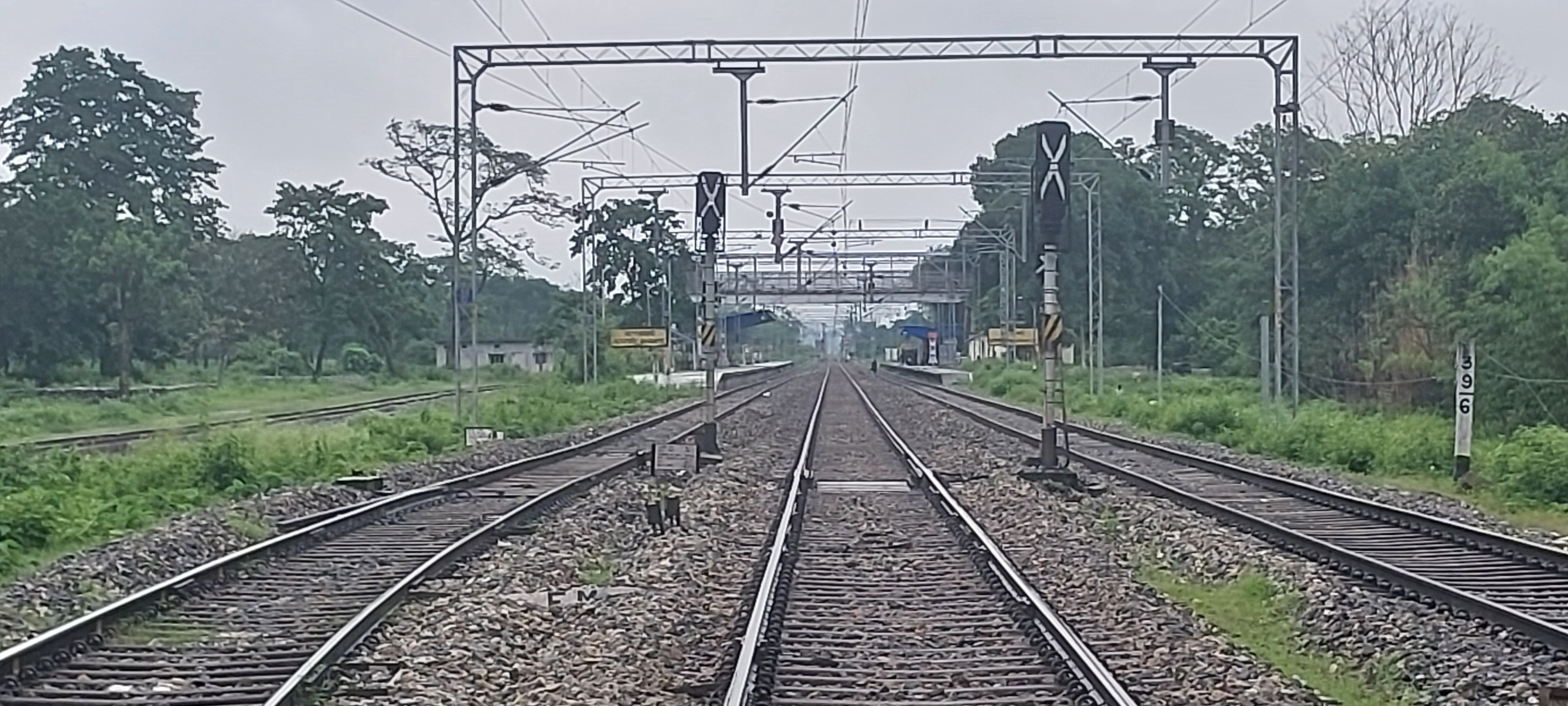

General information
- Location: National Highway 17, near Tea Estate, Bagrakot, Pin - 734501, Dist - Jalpaiguri State: West Bengal; India
- Coordinates: 26.8994°N 88.5846°E
- Elevation: 172 metres (564 ft)
- System: Indian Railways Station
- Owner: Indian Railways
- Operator: Northeast Frontier Railway zone
- Line: New Jalpaiguri–Alipurduar–Samuktala Road line
- Platforms: 2
- Tracks: 2 (broad gauge)

Construction
- Structure type: At grade
- Parking: Available

Other information
- Status: Functioning
- Station code: BRQ
- Zone(s): Northeast Frontier Railway zone
- Division(s): Alipurduar
Location
- Location within West Bengal Location within India

Bagrakote railway station is the railway station which serves the areas of Bagrakote, Chuikhim, Nimbong etc lying on Doars region in the Indian state of West Bengal. It lies in the New Jalpaiguri–Alipurduar–Samuktala Road line of Northeast Frontier Railway zone, Alipurduar railway division.

== Trains ==
Major trains running from Bagrakote Railway Station are as follows:

- Siliguri Bamanhat Intercity Express
- Siliguri–Alipurduar Intercity Express
