= List of airports in Sikkim =

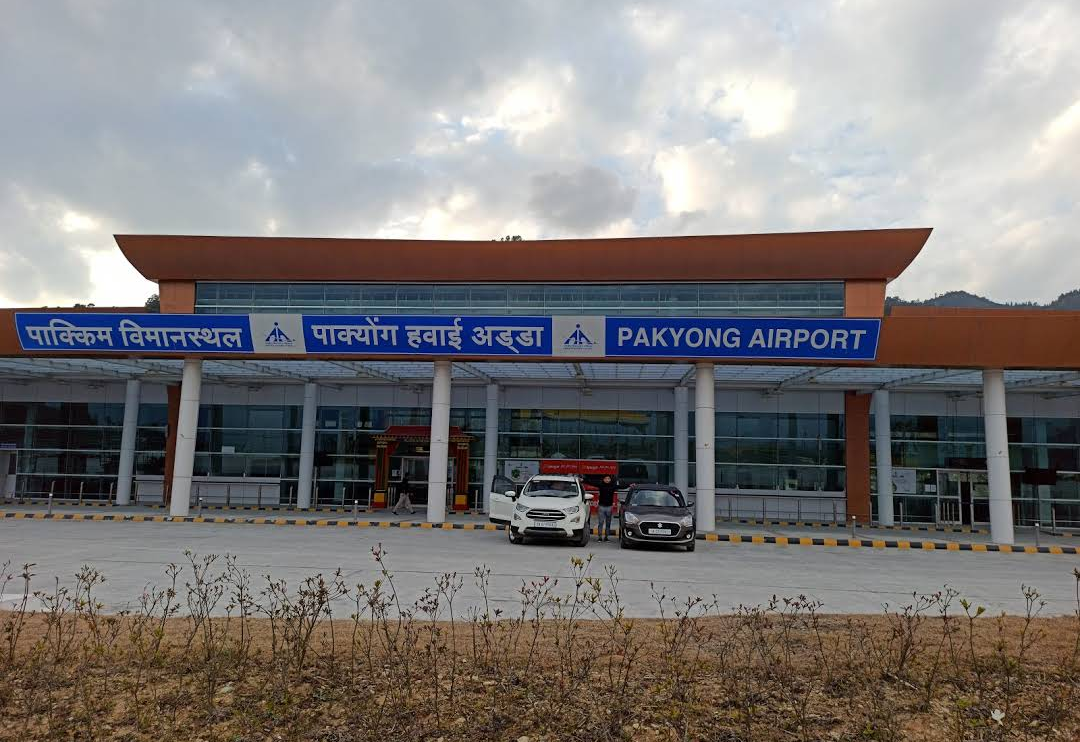
Pakyong Airport, Gangtok

Until 2018, the nearest airport to the north-eastern Indian state of Sikkim was Bagdogra Airport located 124 kilometres from the state capital Gangtok. The state had no airport of its own. However, in 2018, the state's first airport in Pakyong was opened for public use after it was inaugurated by Indian Prime Minister Narendra Modi. In October 2018, SpiceJet became the first airline to launch flights to Pakyong Airport from Delhi and Kolkata. Opening of the Pakyong Airport also marked the opening of India's 100th airport.

== List ==
The list includes the airports in Sikkim with their respective ICAO and IATA codes.

List of airports in Sikkim
Sl. no.	Location in Sikkim	Airport name	ICAO	IATA	Operator	Category	Role
1	Pakyong	Pakyong Airport	VEPY	PYG	Airports Authority of India	Domestic	Commercial
