= Kalimpong =

- Town
- Kalimpong Municipality
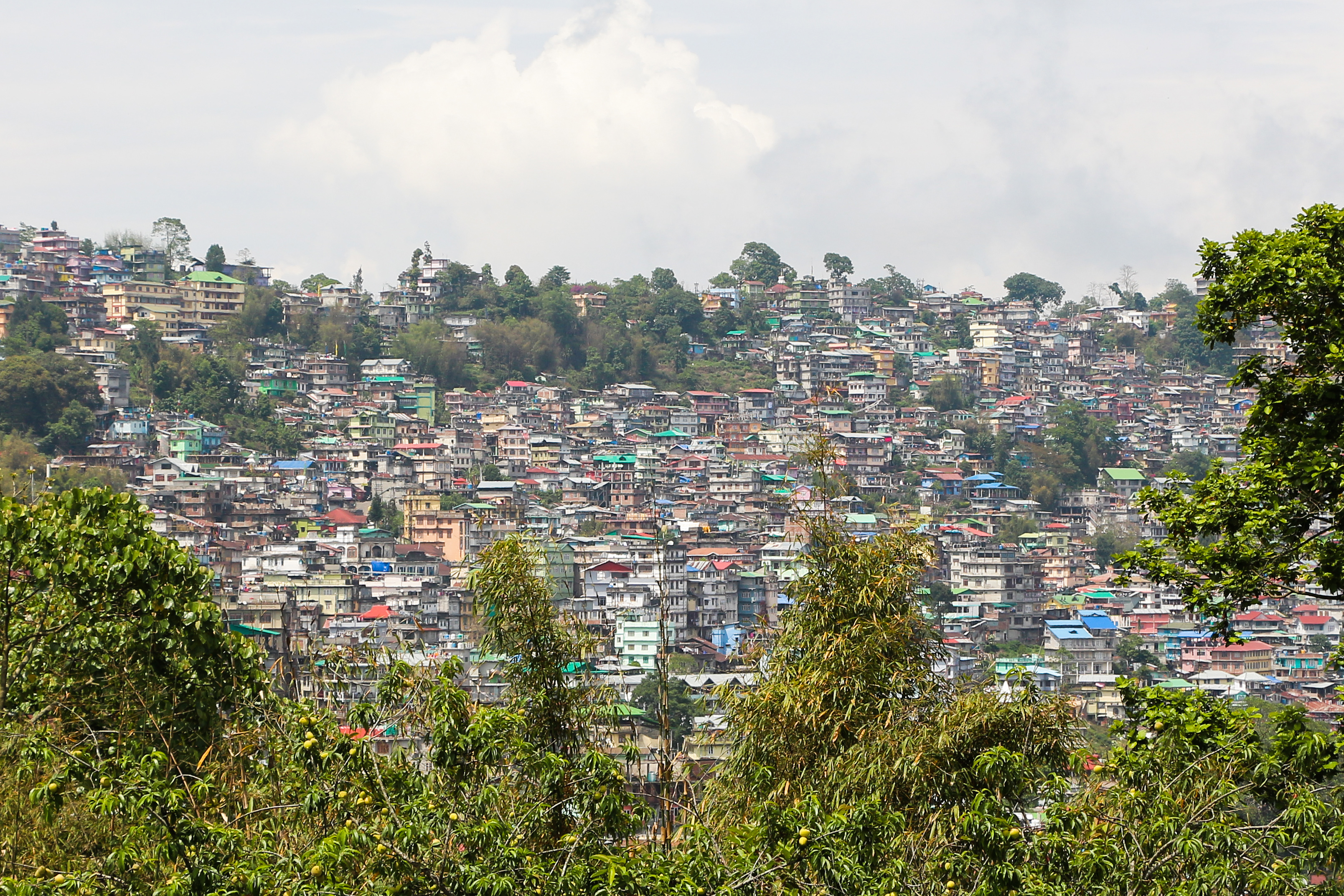
- View of Kalimpong town

- Location within West Bengal Location within India
- Coordinates: 27.06°N 88.47°E
- Country: India
- State: West Bengal
- District: Kalimpong
- Named for: Kaley Bung

Government
  - Type: Municipality
  - Body: Kalimpong Municipality
  - Chairman: Rabi Pradhan

Area
  - Total: 9.168 km^{2} (3.540 sq mi)
- Elevation: 1,247 m (4,091 ft)

Population (2011)
  - Total: 49,403
  - Density: 5,389/km^{2} (13,960/sq mi)

Languages
  - Official: Nepali and Bengali
  - Additional official: English
- Time zone: UTC+5:30 (IST)
- PIN: 734 301/734 316
- Telephone code: 03552
- Vehicle registration: WB-78, 79
- Lok Sabha constituency: Darjeeling
- Vidhan Sabha constituency: Kalimpong
- Website: kalimpong.gov.in kalimpongmunicipality.org

Kalimpong is a town and the headquarters of an eponymous district in the Indian state of West Bengal. It is located at an average elevation of 1,250 metres (4,101 ft). The town is the headquarters of the Kalimpong district. The region comes under the Gorkhaland Territorial Administration which is a semi-autonomous governing body within the state of West Bengal. The Indian Army's 27 Mountain Division is located on the outskirts of the city.

Kalimpong is known for its educational institutions, many of which were established during the British colonial period. It used to be a gateway in the trade between Tibet and India before China's annexation of Tibet and the Sino-Indian War. Kalimpong and neighbouring Darjeeling were major centres calling for a separate Gorkhaland state in the 1980s, and more recently in 2010.

The municipality sits on a ridge overlooking the Teesta River and is a tourist destination owing to its temperate climate, natural environment and proximity to popular tourist locations in the region. Horticulture is important to Kalimpong: It has a flower market notable for its wide array of orchids; nurseries, which export Himalayan grown flower bulbs, tubers and rhizomes, contribute to the economy of Kalimpong. The Tibetan Buddhist monastery Zang Dhok Palri Phodang holds a number of rare Tibetan Buddhist scriptures.

The Kalimpong Science Centre, established under the Darjeeling Gorkha Hill Council in 2008 is a recent addition to its many tourist attractions. The Science Centre, which provides for scientific awareness among the students of the town and the locals sits atop the Deolo Hill.

== Etymology ==
The precise origin of the name Kalimpong remains unclear. There are many theories on the origin of the name. One widely accepted theory claims that the name "Kalimpong" means "Assembly (or Stockade) of the King's Ministers" in Tibetan, derived from kalon ("King's ministers") and pong ("stockade"). The name may be derived from the translation "ridge where we play" from Lepcha, as it was known to be the place for traditional tribal gatherings for summer sporting events. People from the hills call the area Kalempung ("the black spurs").

According to K.P. Tamsang, author of The Untold and Unknown Reality about the Lepchas, the term Kalimpong is deduced from the name Kalenpung, which in Lepcha means "Hillock of Assemblage"; in time, the name was distorted to Kalebung, and later further contorted to Kalimpong. Another possible derivation points to Kaulim, locally known as odal Scientific name Sterculia Villosa, a fibrous plant found in abundance in the region.

== History ==
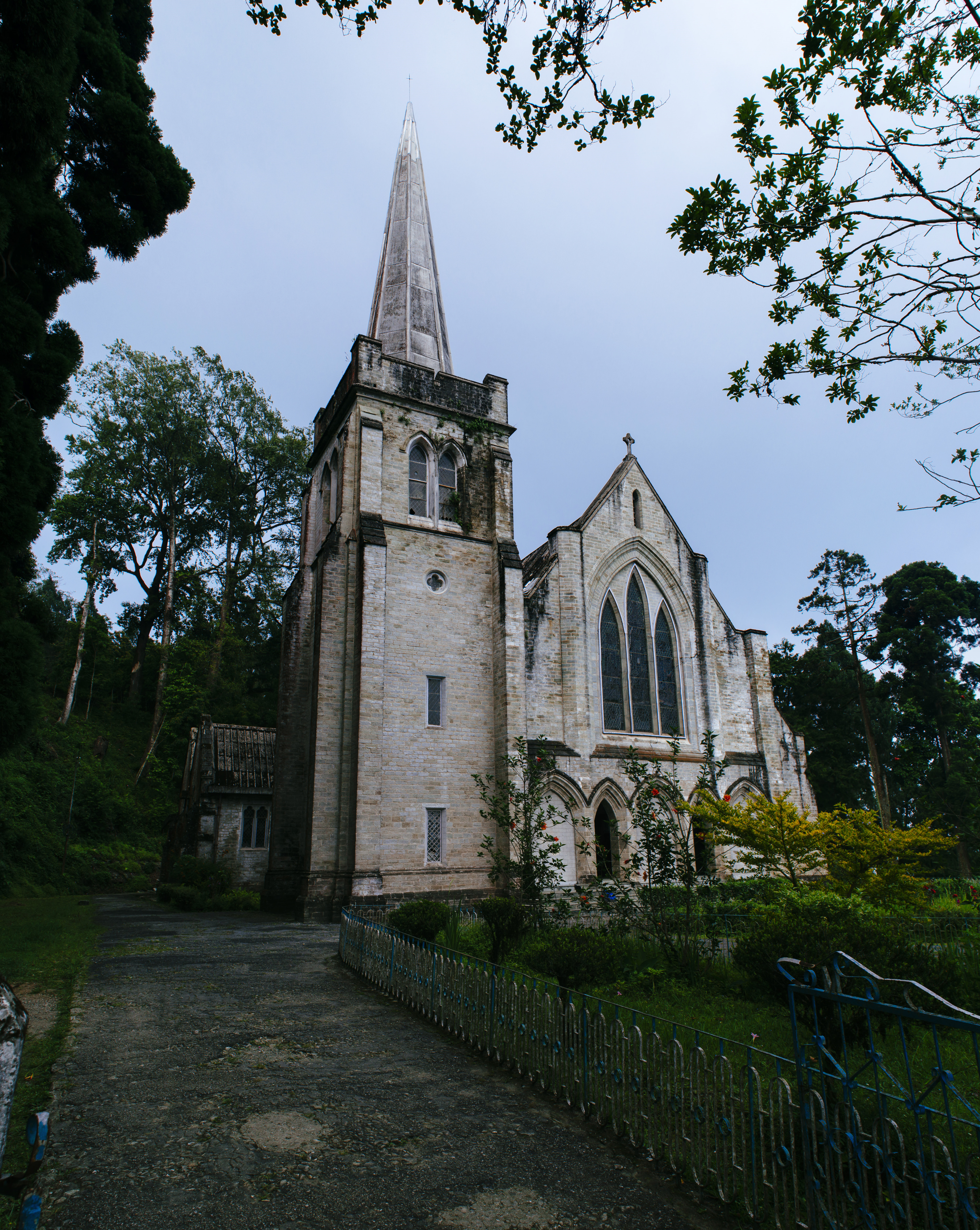
Katherine Graham Memorial Chapel, Dr. Graham's Homes

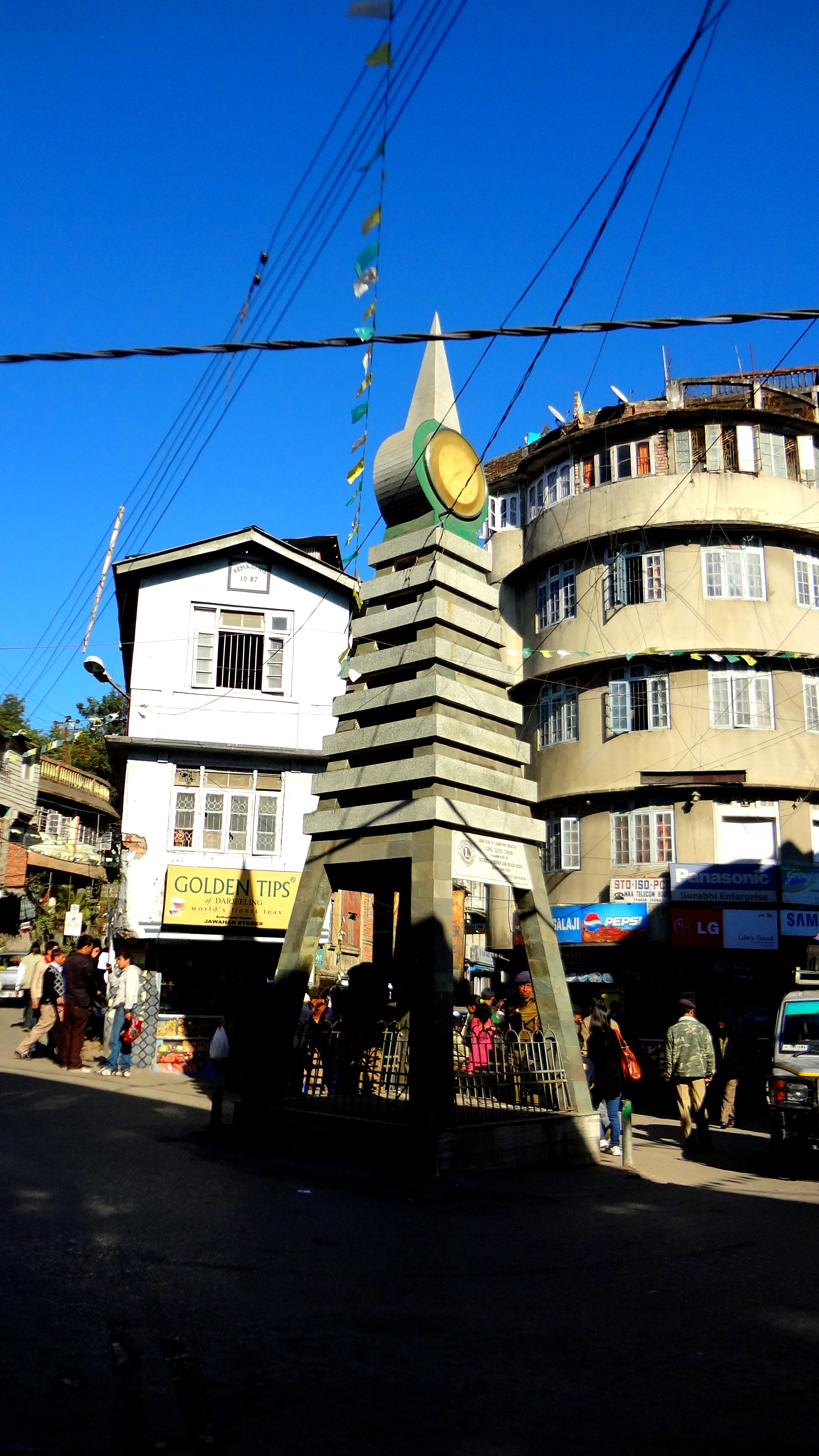
The Clock Tower of Kalimpong.

Until the mid-19th century, the area around Kalimpong was ruled in succession by the Sikkimese and Bhutanese kingdoms. Kalimpong is said to have come under the control of Bhutan in the year 1706. However, according to historians, the Bhutanese encroachments had been in effect for about two decades by then, following the defeat of Gyalpo Ajok and other Lepcha chieftains.

The area was sparsely populated by the indigenous Lepcha and Limbu community and migrant Bhutia and Kirati tribes.

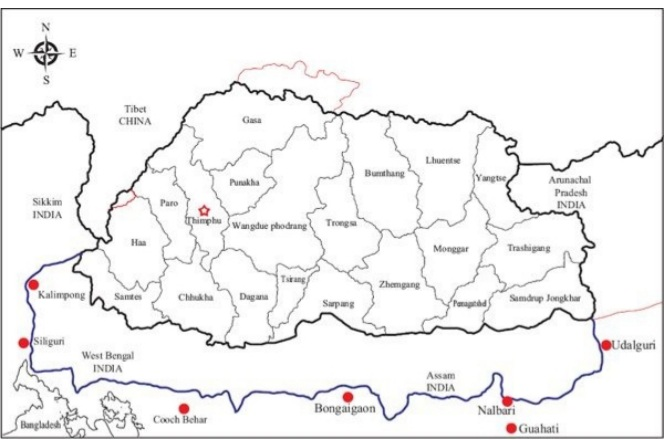
Kalimpong under the Kingdom of Bhutan in blue before the Duar War of 1865

After the Anglo-Bhutan War in 1864, the Treaty of Sinchula (1865) was signed, in which Bhutanese-held territory east of the Teesta River was ceded to the British East India Company. It was administered as the 'Western Duars' district for a few years, and divided into three tehsils. Kalimpong fell into the Dalingkot tehsil, which consisted of all the mountainous part of the annexed territory. In 1867, the Dalingkot tehsil was merged with the Darjeeling district, and eventually renamed the Kalimpong Subdivision.

At the time of annexation, Kalimpong was a hamlet, with only two or three families known to reside there. The first recorded mention of the town was a fleeting reference made that year by Ashley Eden, a government official with the Bengal Civil Service. Kalimpong was added to district of Darjeeling in 1866. In 1866–1867 an Anglo-Bhutanese commission demarcated the common boundaries between the two, thereby giving shape to the Kalimpong subdivision and the Darjeeling district.

After the war, the region became a subdivision of the Western Duars district, and the following year it was merged with the district of Darjeeling. The temperate climate prompted the British to develop the town as an alternative hill station to Darjeeling, to escape the scorching summer heat in the plains. Kalimpong's proximity to the Nathu La and Jelep La passes (La means "pass") for trading with Tibet was an added advantage. It soon became an important trading outpost in the trade of furs, wools and food grains between India and Tibet. The increase in commerce attracted large numbers of Nepali's from the neighbouring Nepal and the lower regions of Sikkim, the areas where, Nepali's were residing since the Gorkha invasion of Sikkim in 1790. The movement of people into the area, transformed Kalimpong from a small hamlet with a few houses, to a thriving town with increased economic prosperity. Britain assigned a plot within Kalimpong to the influential Bhutanese Dorji family, through which trade and relations with Bhutan flowed. This later became Bhutan House, a Bhutanese administrative and cultural centre.

The arrival of Scottish missionaries saw the construction of schools and welfare centres for the British. Rev. W. Macfarlane in the early 1870s established the first schools in the area. The Scottish University Mission Institution was opened in 1886, followed by the Kalimpong Girls High School. In 1900, Reverend J.A. Graham founded the Dr. Graham's Homes for destitute Anglo-Indian students. The young missionary (and aspiring writer and poet) Aeneas Francon Williams, aged 24, arrived in Kalimpong in 1910 to take up the post of assistant schoolmaster at Dr. Graham's Homes, where he later became Bursar and remained working at the school for the next fourteen years. From 1907 onwards, most schools in Kalimpong had started offering education to Indian students. By 1911, the population comprised many ethnic groups, including Nepalis, Lepchas, Tibetans, Muslims, the Anglo-Indian communities. Hence by 1911, the population had swollen to 7,880.

Following Indian independence in 1947, Kalimpong became part of the state of West Bengal, after Bengal was partitioned between India and East Pakistan. With China's annexation of Tibet in 1959, many Buddhist monks fled Tibet and established monasteries in Kalimpong. These monks brought many rare Buddhist scriptures with them. In 1962, the permanent closure of the Jelep Pass after the Sino-Indian War disrupted trade between Tibet and India, and led to a slowdown in Kalimpong's economy. In 1976, the visiting Dalai Lama consecrated the Zang Dhok Palri Phodang monastery, which houses many of the scriptures.

Most large houses in Kalimpong were built during the British era. In the background is Kangchenjunga.

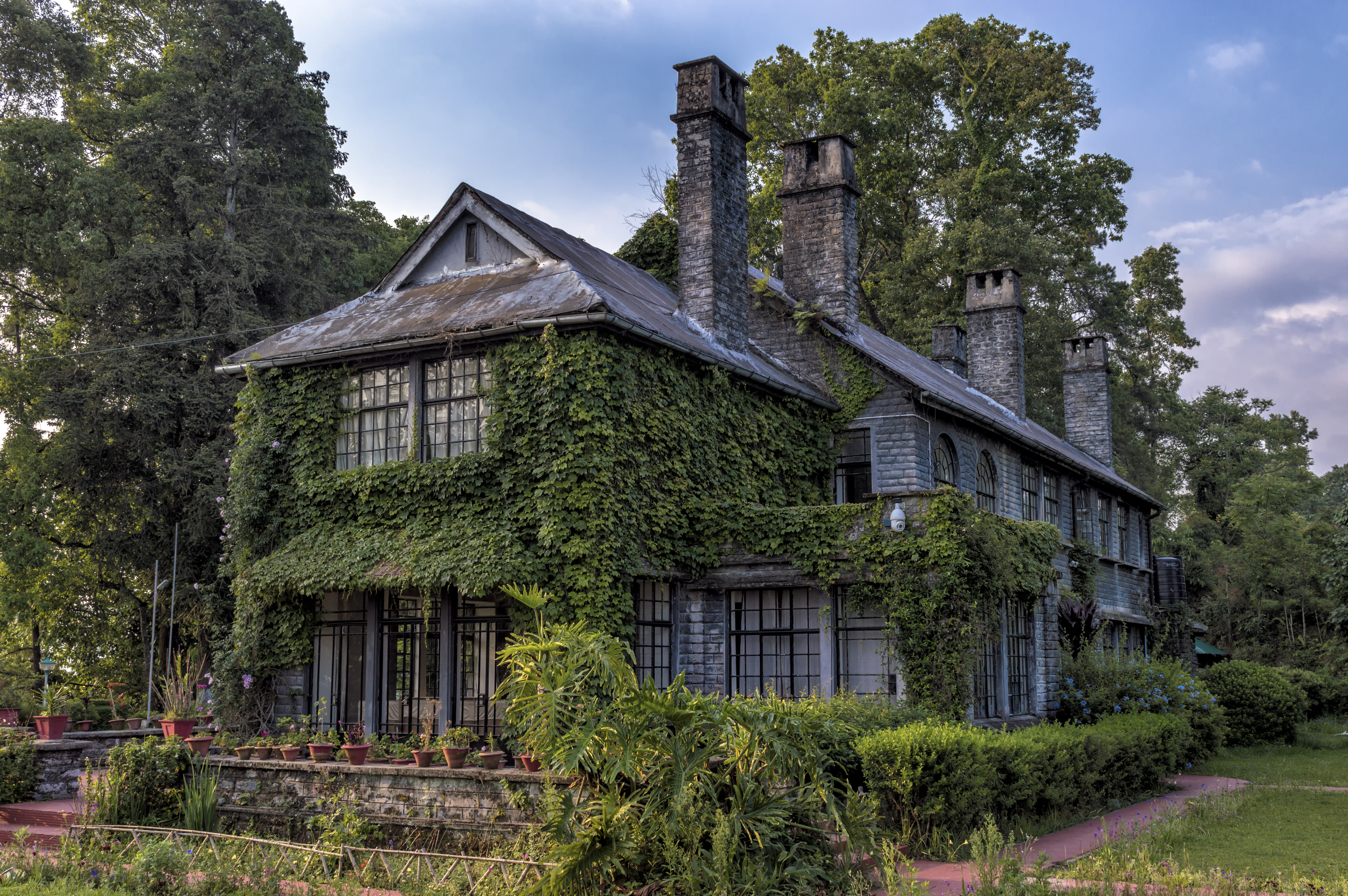
Morgan House is a classic example of colonial architecture in Kalimpong.

Between 1986 and 1988, the demand for a separate state of Gorkhaland and Kamtapur grew strong. Riots between the Gorkha National Liberation Front (GNLF) and the West Bengal government reached a stand-off after a forty-day strike. The town was virtually under siege, and the state government called in the Indian army to maintain law and order.

Across the Darjeeling district, clashes between the GNLF and police led to the death of over 1,200 people.

The police fired on an agitation meeting of the Gorkha National Liberation Front (GNLF) held on 27 July 1986 at the Mela Ground of 9th Mile, Kalimpong. Thirteen persons were killed, while 38 others were wounded in this incident. This day is observed every year as 'Shahid Diwas' or Martyrs' Day in Darjeeling-Kalimpong hills.

Later on, the Darjeeling Gorkha Hill Council was formed, a body that was given semi-autonomous powers to govern the Darjeeling district, except the area under the Siliguri subdivision. Since 2007, the demand for a separate Gorkhaland state has been revived by the Gorkha Janmukti Morcha and its supporters in the Darjeeling hills. The Kamtapur People's Party and its supporters' movement for a separate Kamtapur state covering North Bengal have gained momentum.

== Geography ==
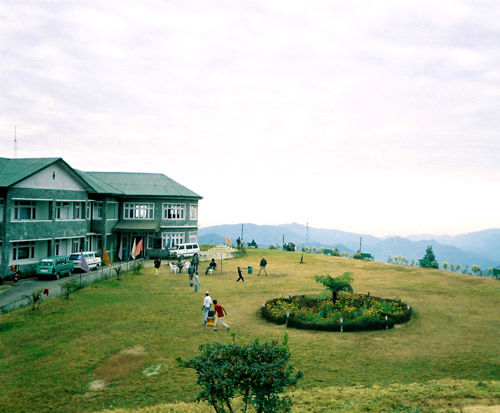
A view from the Deolo Cliff Eco Resort, atop Deolo Hill, Kalimpong's highest point

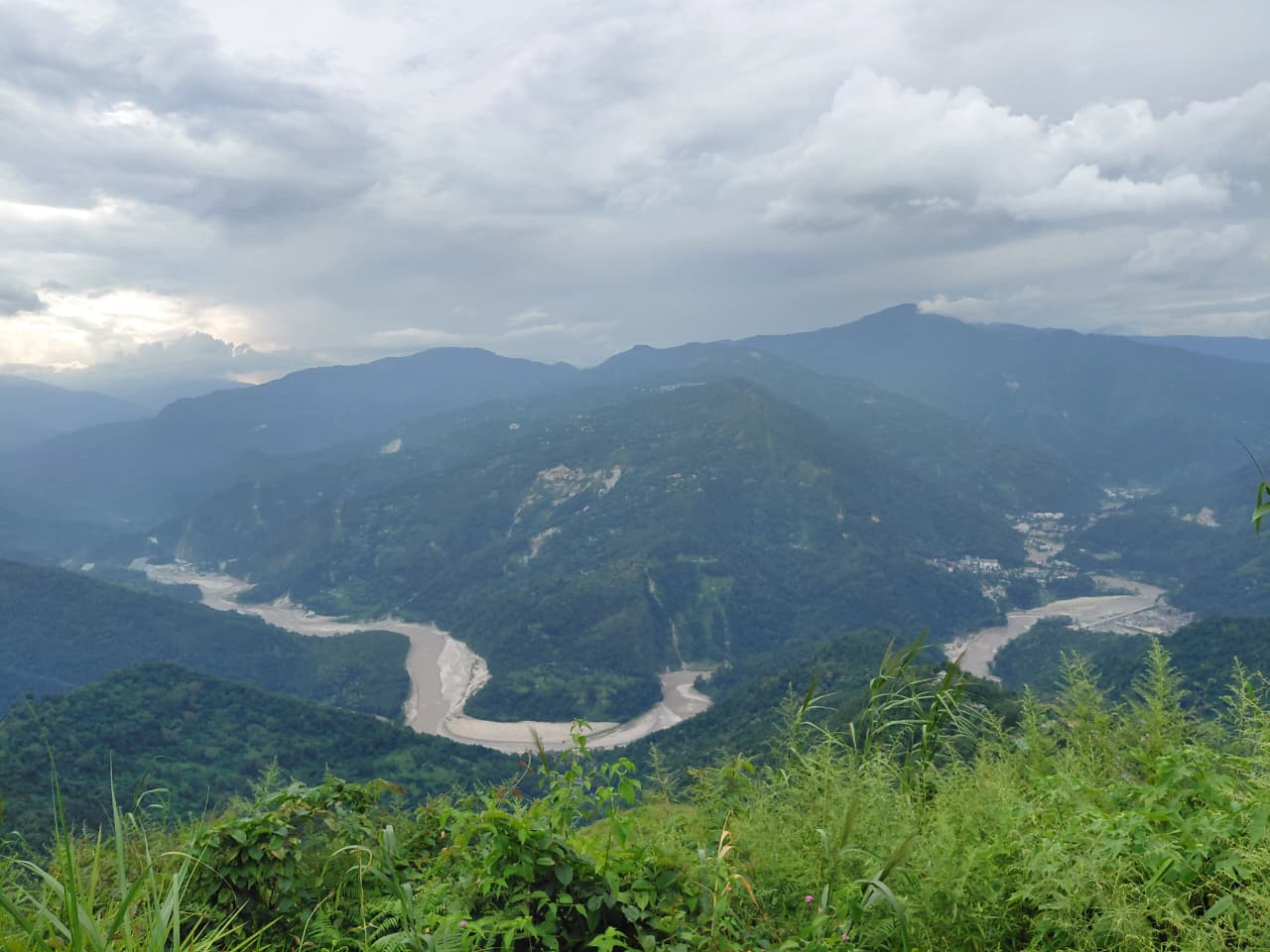
The Teesta River is carving its way through the rugged Himalayan landscape.

The town centre is on a ridge connecting two hills, Deolo Hill and Durpin Hill, at an elevation of 1,247 m (4,091 ft). Deolo, the highest point in Kalimpong, has an altitude of 1,704 m (5,591 ft) and Durpin Hill is at an elevation of 1,372 m (4,501 ft). The River Teesta flows in the valley below and separates Kalimpong from the state of Sikkim. The soil in the Kalimpong area is typically reddish in colour. Occasional dark soils are found due to extensive existence of phyllite and schists. The Shiwalik Hills, like most of the Himalayan foothills, have steep slopes and soft, loose topsoil, leading to frequent landslides in the monsoon season. The hills are nestled within higher peaks and the snow-clad Himalayan ranges tower over the town in the distance. Kanchenjunga, at 8,586 m (28,169 ft) the world's third tallest peak, is clearly visible from Kalimpong.

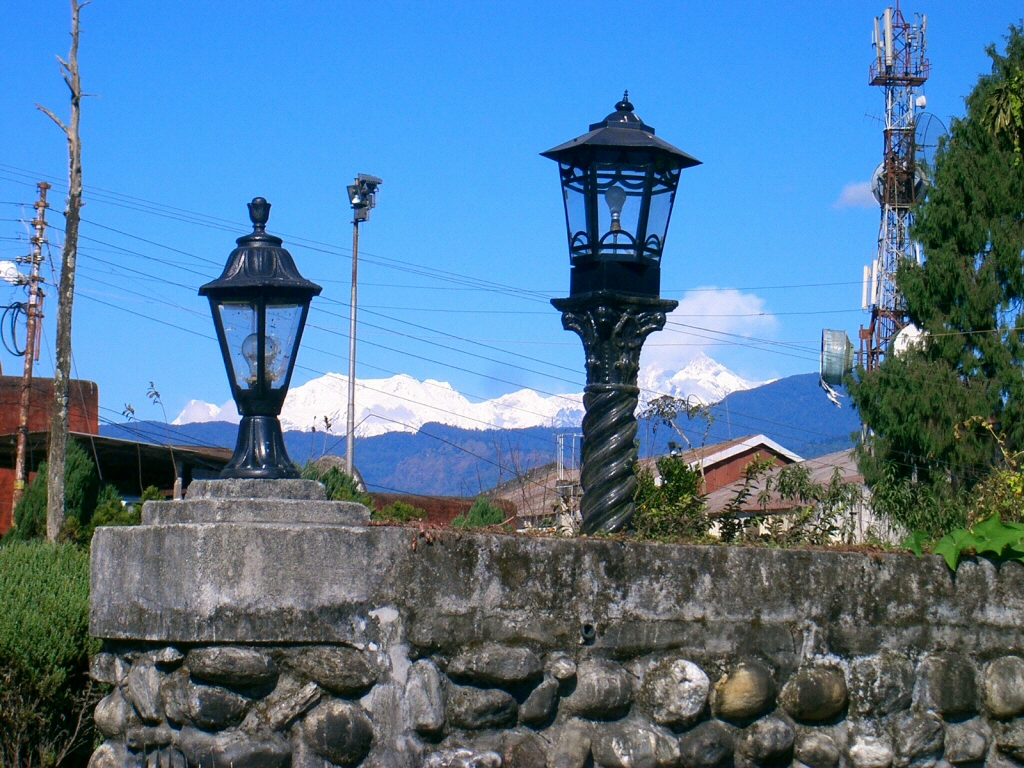
View of Kanchenjunga

=== Climate ===
Kalimpong has a temperate, monsoon-influenced subtropical highland climate (Köppen: Cwb). It has five distinct seasons: spring, summer, autumn, winter and the monsoons. The annual temperature is 18 °C (64 °F). Summers are mild, with an average maximum temperature of 25.5 °C (77.9 °F) in August. Summers are followed by the monsoon rains which lash the town between June and September. The monsoons are severe, often causing landslides which sequester the town from the rest of India. Winter lasts from December to February, with the minimum temperature being around 8 °C (46 °F). During the monsoon and winter seasons, Kalimpong is often enveloped by fog.

Climate data for Kalimpong (1991–2020, extremes 1920–2020)
Month	Jan	Feb	Mar	Apr	May	Jun	Jul	Aug	Sep	Oct	Nov	Dec	Year
Record high °C (°F)	29.9 (85.8)	29.9 (85.8)	31.9 (89.4)	32.4 (90.3)	35.0 (95.0)	33.6 (92.5)	34.1 (93.4)	31.4 (88.5)	32.0 (89.6)	31.1 (88.0)	30.1 (86.2)	29.9 (85.8)	35.0 (95.0)
Mean daily maximum °C (°F)	16.3 (61.3)	16.8 (62.2)	20.5 (68.9)	24.2 (75.6)	25.3 (77.5)	25.5 (77.9)	25.1 (77.2)	25.6 (78.1)	24.7 (76.5)	23.5 (74.3)	20.9 (69.6)	17.6 (63.7)	22.2 (72.0)
Mean daily minimum °C (°F)	6.8 (44.2)	8.4 (47.1)	11.3 (52.3)	14.0 (57.2)	15.2 (59.4)	16.3 (61.3)	16.6 (61.9)	17.7 (63.9)	16.3 (61.3)	14.0 (57.2)	11.2 (52.2)	8.7 (47.7)	13.0 (55.4)
Record low °C (°F)	0.4 (32.7)	0.5 (32.9)	3.8 (38.8)	6.4 (43.5)	4.4 (39.9)	4.6 (40.3)	6.4 (43.5)	7.4 (45.3)	5.9 (42.6)	6.0 (42.8)	3.9 (39.0)	−0.6 (30.9)	−0.6 (30.9)
Average rainfall mm (inches)	16.1 (0.63)	20.2 (0.80)	27.3 (1.07)	85.9 (3.38)	153.0 (6.02)	349.9 (13.78)	628.1 (24.73)	457.9 (18.03)	329.8 (12.98)	62.6 (2.46)	4.5 (0.18)	6.1 (0.24)	2,141.3 (84.30)
Average rainy days	1.2	1.8	2.5	6.1	10.0	14.7	21.4	17.1	13.1	3.1	0.6	0.5	92.0
Average relative humidity (%) (at 17:30 IST)	88	87	85	85	89	93	94	93	93	90	88	88	89
Source: India Meteorological Department

== Economy ==
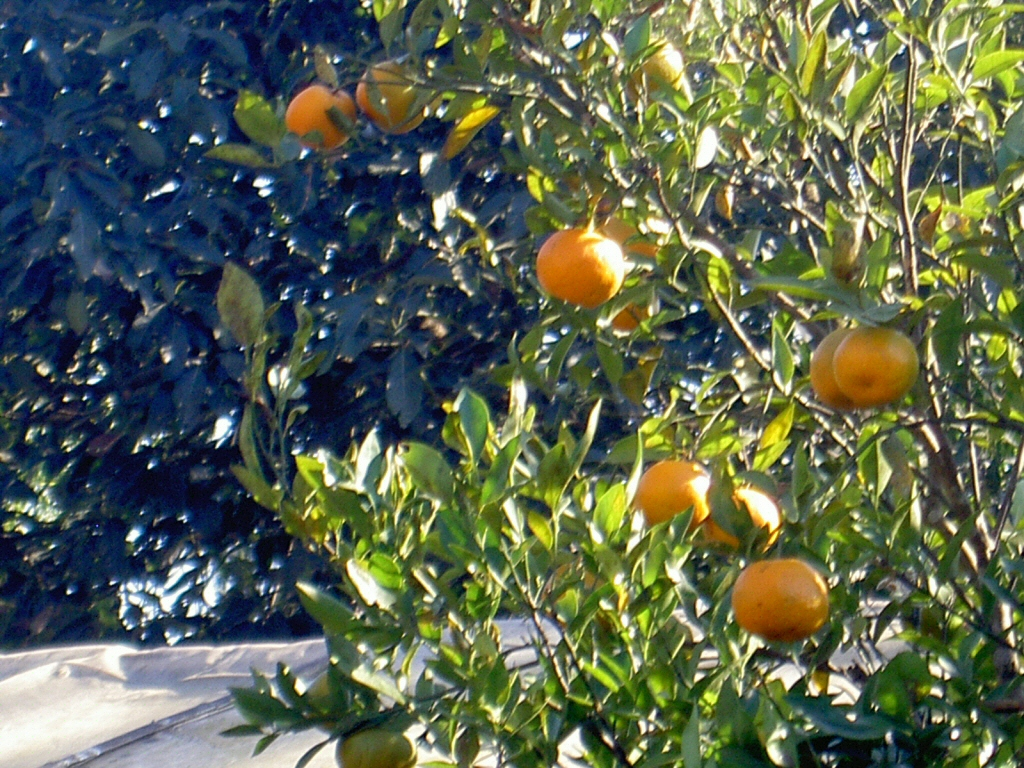
Oranges grown in the hillsides are transported to many parts of India.

Tourism is the most significant contributor to Kalimpong's economy. The summer and spring seasons are the most popular with tourists, keeping many of town's residents employed directly and indirectly. The town—earlier an important trade post between India and Tibet—hoped to boost its economy after the reopening of the Nathu La pass in April 2006. Though this resumed Indo–China border trades, local leaders requested that the Jelep La pass also be reopened to allow trade.

Kalimpong is a major ginger growing area of India. Kalimpong and the state of Sikkim together contribute 15 per cent of the ginger produced in India. The Darjeeling Himalayan hill region is internationally famous for its tea industry. However, most of the tea gardens are on the western side of Teesta river (towards the town of Darjeeling) and so tea gardens near Kalimpong contribute only 4 percent of total tea production of the region. In Kalimpong division, 90 percent of land is cultivable but only 10 percent is used for tea production. Kalimpong is well known for its flower export industry—especially for its wide array of indigenous orchids and gladioli.

A significant contributor to the town's economy is education sector. The schools of Kalimpong, besides imparting education to the locals, attract a significant number of students from the plains, the neighbouring state of Sikkim and countries such as Bhutan, Bangladesh, Nepal and Thailand.

Many establishments cater to the Indian army bases near the town, providing it with essential supplies. Small contributions to the economy come by the way of the sale of traditional arts and crafts of Sikkim and Tibet. Government efforts related to sericulture, seismology, and fisheries provide a steady source of employment to many of its residents.

Kalimpong is well renowned for its cheese, noodles and lollipops. Kalimpong exports a wide range of traditional handicrafts, wood-carvings, embroidered items, bags and purses with tapestry work, copper ware, scrolls, Tibetan jewellery and artefacts.

== Transport ==
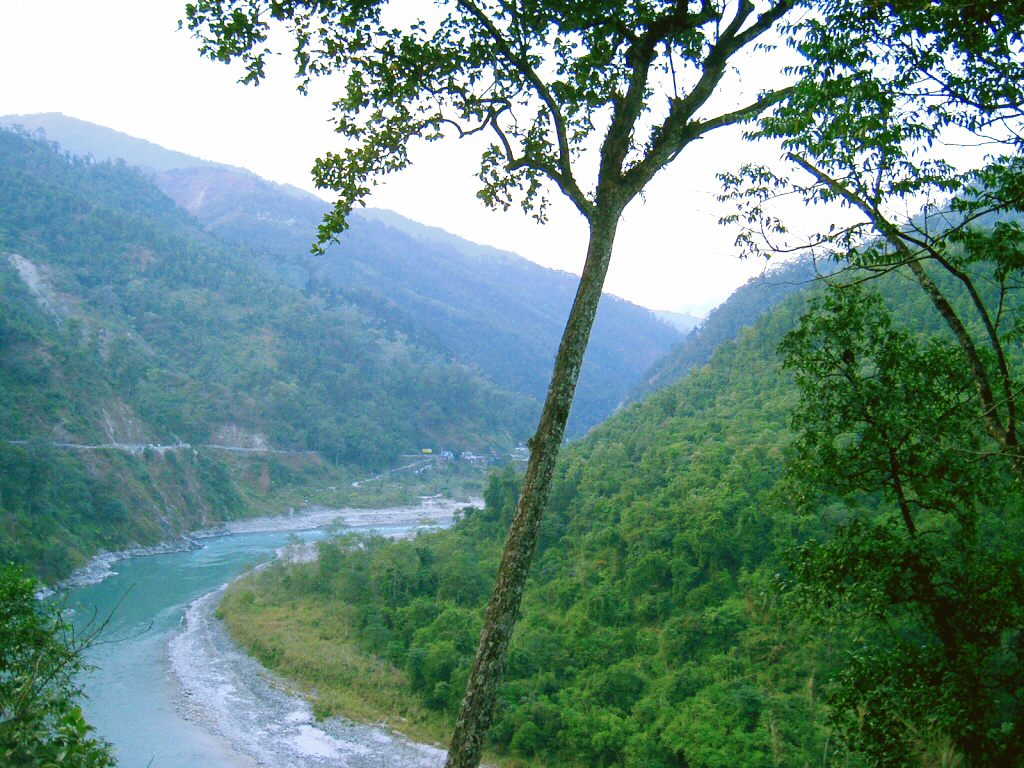
NH10 winds along the banks of the river Teesta near Kalimpong.

=== Roadways ===
Kalimpong is located off the NH10, which links Sevoke to Gangtok. NH-717A connecting Bagrakote with Gangtok is located at Algarah, 16 kilometres away from Kalimpong. These two National Highways together, via Sevoke and Lava, links Kalimpong to the plains. Regular bus services, Jeep Services and hired vehicles connect Kalimpong with Siliguri and the neighbouring towns and cities like Gangtok, Kurseong, Darjeeling, Namchi, Ravangla, Pakyong, Malbazar, Rhenock, Rongli, Algarah, Pedong, Lava, Gorubathan, Rangpo, Jaldhaka, Singtam, Pelling, Rorathang, Melli, Jorethang, Sevoke, Todey Tangta, Gyalshing and Mirik.

=== Airways ===
The nearest airport is Pakyong Airport 56 kilometres (35 mi) kilometres away and Bagdogra International Airport about 80 kilometres (50 mi) from Kalimpong. Vistara, IndiGo, Go First, Akasa Air, AIX Connect, Air India, SpiceJet and Druk Air (Bhutan) are the major carriers that connect Bagdogra airport to Chennai, Bangalore, Ahmedabad, Hyderabad, Mumbai, Delhi, Paro(Bhutan), Guwahati, Kolkata, Dibrugarh and Bangkok (Thailand) whereas SpiceJet is the only carrier operating from Pakyong Airport which connects Delhi, Kolkata and Guwahati.

=== Railway ===
Under construction

- Tista Bazaar railway station 18 kilometres and
- Melli railway station 20 kilometres away are the two railway stations which lies on the under construction Sivok - Rangpo Railway Line which will serve Kalimpong in the future.

The closest currently operating major railway stations from Kalimpong are as follows:

1. Sivok Junction - 45 kilometres.
2. Siliguri Junction - 66 kilometres
3. Malbazar Junction - 74 kilometres
4. New Jalpaiguri Junction - 75 kilometres

== Demographics ==
Historical population
Year	Pop.	±%
1991	38,832	—
2001	40,143	+3.4%
2011	42,988	+7.1%
Source: Census of India

At the 2011 India census, Kalimpong town area had a population of 42,988, of which 52% were male and 48% female.

At the 2001 census, Kalimpong had an average literacy rate of 79%, higher than the national average of 59.5%: male literacy was 84%, and female literacy was 73%. In Kalimpong, 8% of the population was under 6 years of age. The Scheduled castes and scheduled tribes population for Kalimpong was 5,100 and 5,121 respectively.

=== Religion ===
Religious Demographic in Kalimpong City (2011)
1. Hinduism (65.7%)
2. Buddhism (16.4%)
3. Christianity (12.5%)
4. Islam (4.27%)
5. Others (1.03%)

== Civic administration ==
Kalimpong is the headquarters of the Kalimpong district. The semi-autonomous Darjeeling Gorkha Hill Council, set up by the West Bengal government in 1988, administers this district as well as the Darjeeling Sadar and Kurseong subdivisions. Kalimpong elects eight councillors, who manage the departments of Public Health, Education, Public Works, Transport, Tourism, Market, Small scale industries, Agriculture, Agricultural waterways, Forest (except reserved forests), Water, Livestock, Vocational Training and Sports and Youth services. The district administration of Darjeeling, which is the authoritative body for the departments of election, panchayat, law and order, revenue, etc., also acts as an interface of communication between the Council and the State Government. The rural area in the district covers three community development blocks Kalimpong I, Kalimpong II and Gorubathan consisting of forty-two gram panchayats. A Sub-Divisional Officer (SDO) presides over the Kalimpong subdivision. Kalimpong has a police station that serves the municipality and 18 gram panchayats of Kalimpong–I CD block.

The Kalimpong municipality, which was established in 1945, is in charge of the infrastructure of the town such as potable water and roads. The municipal area is divided into twenty-three wards. Kalimpong municipality is constructing additional water storage tanks to meet the requirement of potable water, and it needs an increase of water supply from the 'Neora Khola Water Supply Scheme' for this purpose. Often, landslides occurring in monsoon season cause havoc to the roads in and around Kalimpong. The West Bengal State Electricity Distribution Corporation Limited (WBSEDCL) provides electricity here. Renewable Energy Development Agency of the state has plans to promote usage of solar street lights in Kalimpong and proposed an energy park here to sell renewable energy gadgets. The Public Works Department is responsible for the road connecting the town to the National Highway–NH-31A. The Kalimpong municipality has a total of 10 health care units, with a total of 433 bed capacity.

The Kalimpong assembly constituency, which is an assembly segment of the Darjeeling parliamentary constituency, elects one member of the Vidhan Sabha of West Bengal.

== People, culture, and cuisine ==
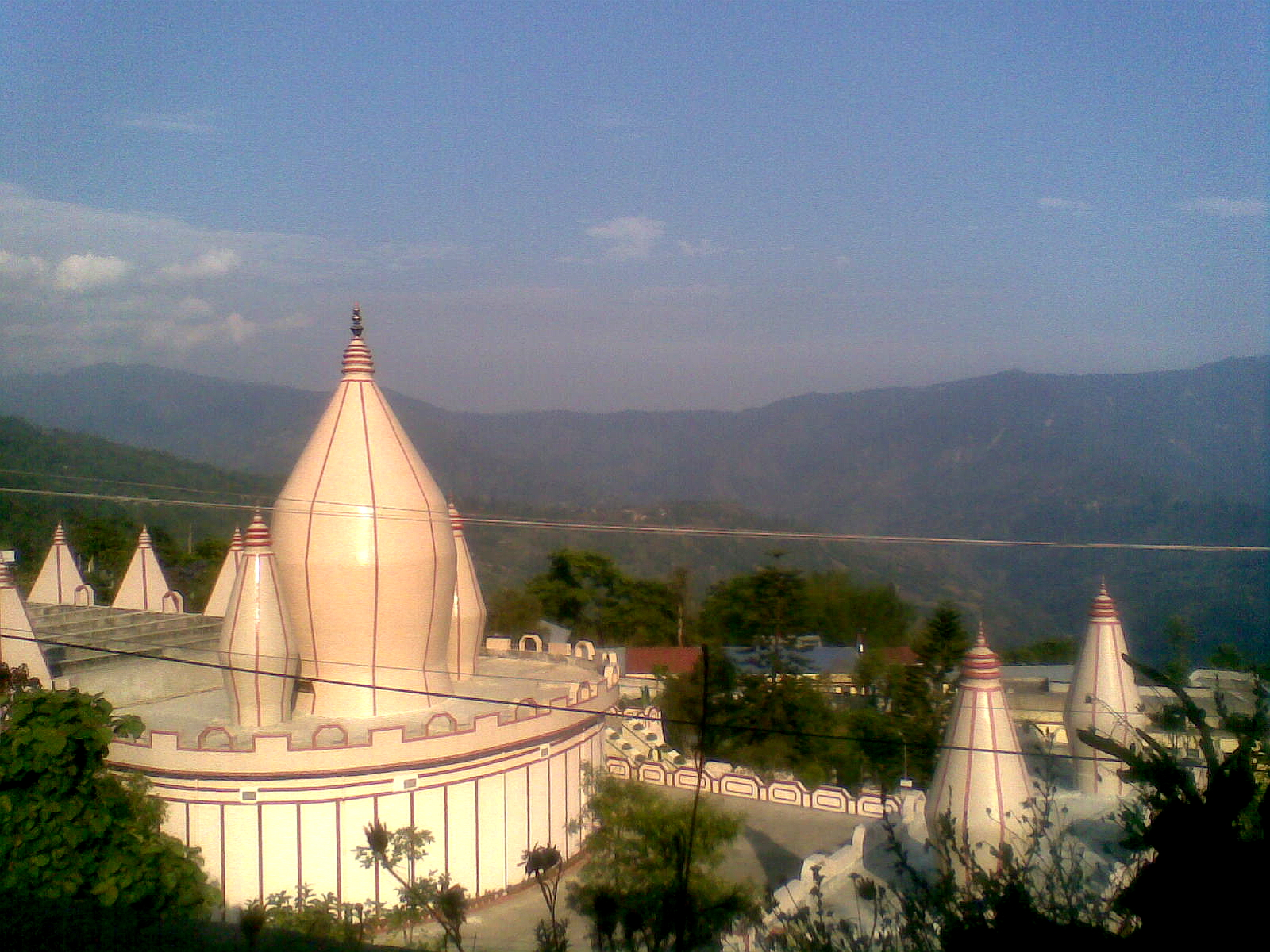
Mangal Dham Mandir

The majority of Indians in Kalimpong adhere to Hinduism. The original settlers of Kalimpong are the Lepchas, who also form one of main ethnic groups of Sikkim and Bhutan. The majority of the populace are ethnic Indian Gorkhas.

Indigenous ethnic groups include the Bhutia, Limbus, Rais, Sherpas, Magars, Chettris, Bahuns, Thakuris, Gurungs, Tamangs, Yolmos, Bhujels, Yakkhas, Sunuwars, Sarkis, Damais and the Kamis. The other non-native communities as old as the Indian Gorkhas are the Bengalis, Muslims, Anglo-Indians, Chinese, Biharis and Tibetans who escaped to Kalimpong after fleeing the Communist Chinese invasion of Tibet. Kalimpong is home to Trinley Thaye Dorje—one of the 17th Karmapa incarnations. Kalimpong is the closest Indian town to Bhutan's western border, and has a small number of Bhutanese nationals residing here. Hinduism is the largest religion followed by Nijananda Sampradaya, Buddhism and Christianity. Islam has a minuscule presence in this region, The Oldest settlers include people residing since the mid of 19th Century and also mostly Tibetan Muslims who fled in 1959 after Chinese invasion of Tibet. The Buddhist monastery Zang Dhok Palri Phodang holds a number of rare Tibetan Buddhist scriptures. There is a Mosque, Kalimpong Anjuman Islamia Established in 1887 in the bazaar area of Kalimpong.

Local Hindu festivals include Diwali, Holi, Dussehra, Tihar, Sakela Cultural Programme and the Tibetan festival of Losar. The official languages are Hindi, Bengali and Nepali, with English acting as the additional official language. Languages spoken in Kalimpong include Nepali and Hindi, which are the predominant languages; Lepcha, Limbu, Rai, Tamang, and English. Though there is a growing interest in cricket as a winter sport in Darjeeling Hills, football still remains the most popular sport in Kalimpong. Every year since 1947, the Independence Shield Football Tournament is organised here as part of the two-day-long Independence Day celebrations. Former captain of India national football team, Pem Dorjee Sherpa hails from Kalimpong.

A popular snack in Kalimpong is the momo, steamed dumplings made of chicken, pork, beef or vegetable cooked in a wrapping of flour and served with watery soup. Wai-Wai is a packaged Thai snack made of noodles which are eaten either dry or in soup form. Churpee, a kind of hard cheese made from yak's or chauri's (a hybrid of yak and cattle) milk, is sometimes chewed. A form of noodle called Thukpa, served in soup form is popular in Kalimpong. There are a large number of restaurants which offer a wide variety of cuisines, ranging from Indian to continental, to cater to the tourists. Tea is the most popular beverage in Kalimpong, procured from the famed Darjeeling tea gardens. Kalimpong has a golf course besides Kalimpong Circuit House.

The cultural centres in Kalimpong include, the Lepcha Museum and the Zang Dhok Palri Phodang monastery. The Lepcha Museum, a kilometre away from the town centre, showcases the culture of the Lepcha community, the indigenous peoples of Sikkim. The Zang Dhok Palri Phodong monastery has 108 volumes of the Kangyur, and belongs to the Gelug of Buddhism.

Doma Wang was born and raised in Kalimpong.

== Media ==
Kalimpong has access to most of the television channels aired in the rest of India. Cable Television still provides service to many homes in the town and its outskirts, while DTH connections are now practically mandatory throughout the country. Besides mainstream Indian channels, many Nepali-language channels such as Dainandini DD, Kalimpong Television KTv, Haal Khabar (an association of the Hill Channel Network), Jan Sarokar, Himalayan People's Channel (HPC), and Kalimpong Times are broadcast in Kalimpong. These channels, which mainly broadcast locally relevant news, are produced by regional media houses and news networks, and are broadcast through the local cable network, which is now slowly becoming defunct due to the Indian government's ruling on mandatory digitisation of TV channels. The movie production houses like JBU films produces the movies on the nepali and other languages.

Newspapers in Kalimpong include English language dailies The Statesman and The Telegraph, which are printed in Siliguri, and The Economic Times and the Hindustan Times, which are printed in Kolkata.

Among other languages, Nepali, Hindi and Bengali are prominent vernacular languages used in this region. Newspapers in all these four languages are available in the Darjeeling Hills region. Of the largely circulated Nepali newspapers Himalay Darpan, Swarnabhumi and some Sikkim-based Nepali newspapers like Hamro Prajashakti and Samay Dainik are read most. The Tibet Mirror was the first Tibetan-language newspaper published in Kalimpong in 1925. while Himalayan Times was the first English to have come out from Kalimpong in the year 1947, it was closed down in the year 1962 after the Chinese aggression but was started once again and is now in regular print.

All India Radio and several other National and Private Channels including FM Radio are received in Kalimpong.

The area is serviced by major telecommunication companies of India with most types of cellular services in most areas.

== Flora and fauna ==
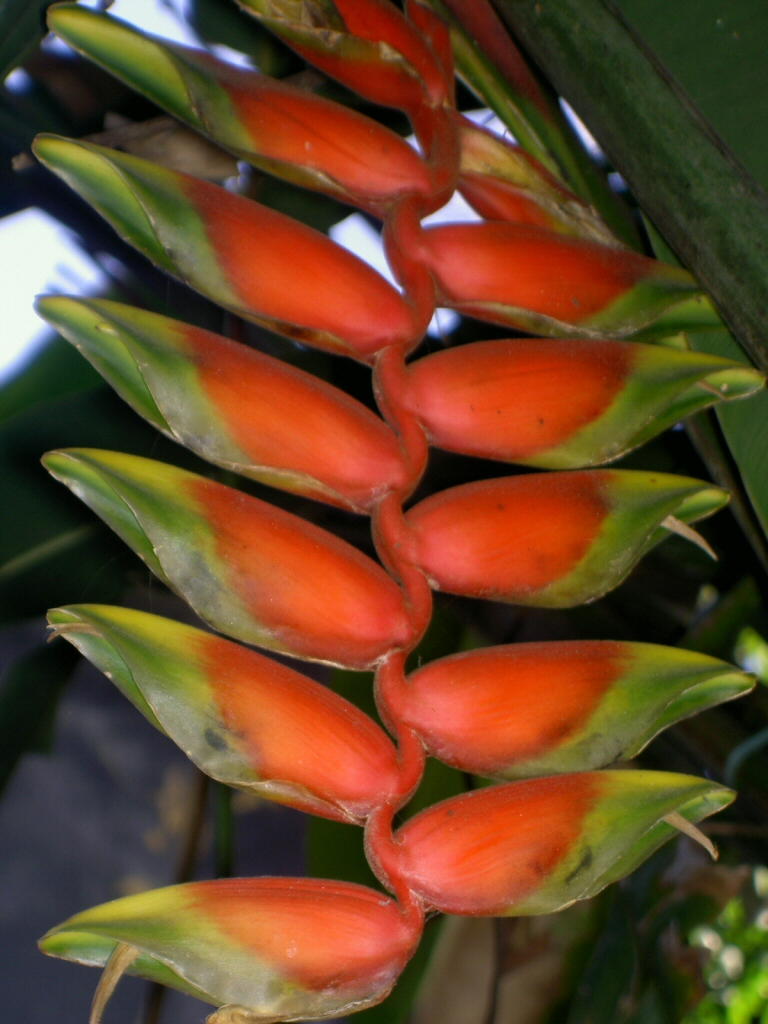
Heliconia

The area around Kalimpong lies in the Eastern Himalayas, which is classified as an ecological hotspot, one of only three among the ecoregions of India. Neora Valley National Park lies within the Kalimpong subdivision and is home to tigers. Acacia is the most commonly found species at lower altitudes, while cinnamon, ficus, bamboo and cardamom, are found in the hillsides around Kalimpong. The forests found at higher altitudes are made up of pine trees and other evergreen alpine vegetation. Seven species of rhododendrons are found in the region east of Kalimpong. The temperate deciduous forests include oak, birch, maple and alder. Three hundred species of orchid are found around Kalimpong.

The Red panda, Clouded leopard, Siberian weasel, Asiatic black bear, barking deer, Himalayan tahr, goral, gaur and pangolin are some of the fauna found near Kalimpong. Avifauna of the region include the pheasants, cuckoos, minivets, flycatchers, bulbuls, orioles, owls, partridges, sunbirds, warblers, swallows, swifts and woodpeckers.

Kalimpong is a major production centre of gladioli in India, and orchids, which are exported to many parts of the world. The Rishi Bankim Chandra Park is an ecological museums within Kalimpong. Citrus Dieback Research Station at Kalimpong works towards control of diseases, plant protection and production of disease free orange seedlings.

Kalimpong is also known for their practice of cactus cultivation. Its nurseries attract people from far and wide for the collection of cacti they cultivate. The strains of cacti, though not indigenous to the locale, have been carefully cultivated over the years, and now the town boasts one of the most exhaustive collections of the family Cactaceae. The plants have adapted well to the altitude and environment, and now prove to be one of the chief draws of tourism to the township.

== Notable people ==
- Suman Kumar Dhar, professor
- Gyalo Thondup, brother of the 14th Dalai Lama
- Doma Wang, chef

== Bibliography ==
- Foning, A. R.; Christoph von Fürer-Haimendorf (forward) (1987). Lepcha, My Vanishing Tribe. New Delhi: Sterling Publishers. ISBN 978-81-207-0685-9.
- O'Malley, L. S. S., ed. (1907), Bengal District Gazetteers: Darjeeling, Government of Bengal – via archive.org
- Roy, D. C., ed. (2013), Survey and Settlement of the Western Duarsl in the District of Jalpaiguri 1889–1895, D. H. E. Sunder, Siliguri: N. L. Publishers – via archive.org
