= Doma Wang =

Indian chef and restauranteur

- Born: Kalimpong, West Bengal
- Culinary career
- Current restaurant: The Blue Poppy Thakali
- Awards won: NDTV Best Restauranteur in India 2026; Culinary Culture 5th Best Chef in India 2025; Culinary Culture 15th Best Chef in India 2024; Culinary Culture 19th Best Chef in India 2022

Doma Wang, also called Doma Di, is an Indian chef of Tibetan heritage who has been known for popularizing Tibetan cuisine in and around Kolkata. She opened a restaurant, The Blue Poppy Thakali, and has been ranked in the Top 30 Chefs in India three times by Culinary Culture, including fifth in 2025.

== Biography ==
Doma Wang was born and raised in Kalimpong, before it became a district. Her father was the principal of the local Chinese school and also owned a noodle factory, which was in the upper floor of their family home. Her father was also the one to teach her to cook food, such as Momo, and instill a love for food in her.

She worked as an interpreter for a Buddhist cultural organization in Kolkata, but after the office relocated to Gaya, Wang decided to launch a home delivery system, delivering homemade momo and thukpa in Bidhannagar. She was then invited by the Sikkim Tourism Ministry to the Sikkim House Canteen in Kolkata. In 2019, after a government change that resulted in the loss of her lease, she moved to the building next door and opened a new restaurant version, The Blue Poppy Thakali.

She has become known for bringing Tibetan cuisine to Indian attention, and became known as the "Momo Queen of India".

Her daughter, Sachiko Seth, is also a chef and has assisted Wang in her work. Together, Wang, Seth, and her niece Manisha Sangma also opened Boma Asian Bakery, a Korean-inspired bakery, and Popo's, in honor of Wang's father.

Wang also opened Shim Shim, a Himalayan restaurant focused on beef. She has held many pop-ups, including ones in Chennai, Pune, and Bengaluru. She was one of five chefs selected for Power Play at Masters of Marriott Bonvoy.

She has been ranked in the Top 30 Chefs in India by Culinary Culture on three occasions: in 2022, she was ranked 19th. In 2024, she was ranked 15th. And in 2025, she was ranked 5th. She was ranked Best Restauranteur in India by the NDTV Food Awards in 2026.
