= Chuikhim =

Chuikhim is a village on National Highway 717A south of the Kalimpong Hills in West Bengal in India, 3500 feet above sea level. Every November it hosts the Indradhanush Chuikhim Earth Festival. There is a community-based tourism system in Chuikhim where tourists stay at the home of villagers..
