= Gaeboo Achyok =

Lepcha chieftain

Gaeboo Achyok (r. c. 1660 – 1676) or Gyalpo Ajok (Tibetan: ཨ་ལྕོག, Wylie: rgyal po A lcog, THL: gyalpo achok) was a Lepcha chieftain of a principality based at Damsang, presently in the Kalimpong district of West Bengal, India.

Achyok faced active threats from Bhutan and formed an alliance with Tibet. The conflict resulted in several wars until Achyok was captured at Daling and executed.

== Name ==
Achyok is a Lepcha name, which is more accurately transliterated as áchúk. The Tibetan spelling — Tibetan: ཨ་ལྕོག, Wylie: a lcog — can be variously transliterated as "Achuk", "Achok", "Achog", and "Ajok". Some Tibetan and Bhutanese sources also use the spelling "Amchok".

=== Honorific ===
Lepchas honor him with Gyebú, translating to "great". The Tibetans refer to him as a Gyalpo, meaning "king". In contrast, the Bhutanese address him as a Monpa (low-lander), regarding him as their rebel-subject.

== Historical context ==
The region consisting of present-day Sikkim, Chumbi Valley and western Bhutan was largely a frontier territory since early seventeenth century. Not held by any major power, its primary inhabitants were Indian tribes, Lepchas and Bhutias.

In the early 17th century, Tibetans started to immigrate and settle in the region due to a variety of causes including sectarian persecution. In 1642, the royal house of Chogyals was founded in Western Sikkim, (Note: Eastern Sikkim continued to be under Lepcha chieftains.) ostensibly as an alliance between Lepchas and these immigrants. Around the same time, the Bhutanese state was getting unified under Ngawang Namgyal and would enter into a protracted conflict with an expansionist Tibet. The first war was fought in late 1650s and the Tibetans lost comprehensively.

== Biography ==
=== Rise to power ===
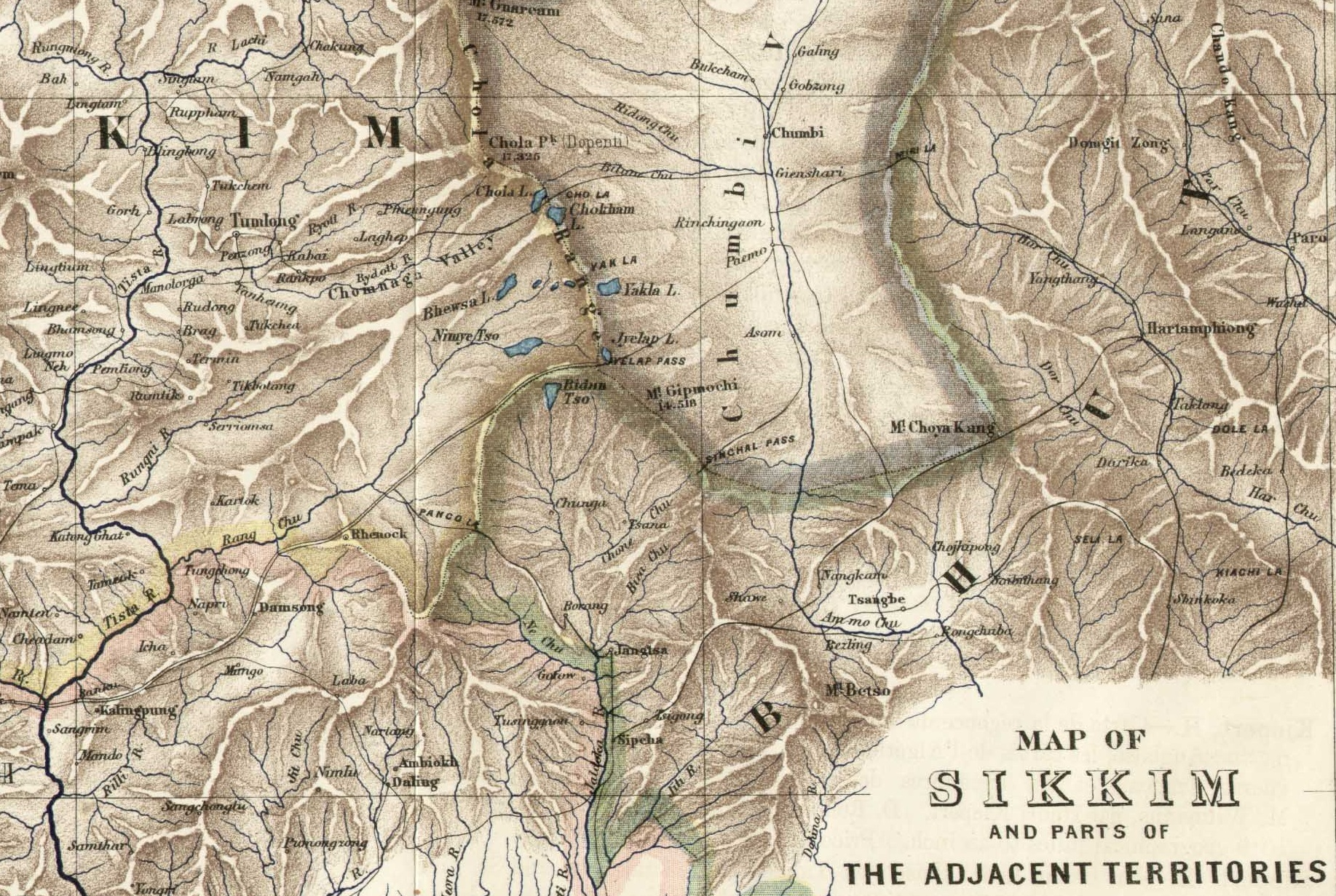
Damsang shown on the trade route between Kalimpong and the Chumbi Valley; Daling is to the southeast of Damsang. (Sir Richard Temple, 1881) (Note: Map not drawn to scale; incorrect in several details.)

The first mention of Gaeebo Achyok is found in the biography of Kunchok Gyaltshan. (Note: Also transliterated as Könchok Gyeltsen and Dkon-mchog-rgyal-mtshan.) C. 1634, Kunchok Gyaltshan, a Tibetan monk of the Barawa sect (Note: Barawa is a branch of the Drukpa school; it is unrelated to the eponymous Bhutanese lineage.) was exiled from Bhutan along with his followers for not supporting the Namgyal regime.

He went on to settle in Damsang — a strategic location on a ridge overlooking the Rhenock valley and the Jelep La route to Tibet. Gyaltshan constructed several small monasteries in and around the region; he is said to have received all necessary approvals from the Chogyals.

In the meanwhile, Bhutan's religio-military assault kept on the rise with chronicles recording a dispatch of forces to nearby Dagana in 1650, to subdue recalcitrant monpas — this might have affected Damsang, as well.

Despite these hurdles, including what he notes to be an increased presence of Bhutanese monks, Gyaltshan managed to exert significant command in the local population. In 1660, he chose to return to his home monastery, in Tibet, for a vacation.

By the time he returned c. 1663, more Lamas from Bhutan had encroached on his territories and a local Lepcha chieftain, Gaeebo Achyok, had assumed control. Gyaltshan did not resist these encroachments and ventured northward. The extent of Achyok's sovereignty at this stage remains uncertain. (Note: A text available to Shagapka describes)

=== Conflict with the Bhutanese ===
Soon afterward, the Bhutanese Lamas began to exert pressure on the Lepchas, aided by their regional fortress at Daling, which was probably an old Lepcha fort usurped by the Bhutanese in the war of 1650s. (Note: The fortress is referred to as Dalingkot (lit. Fort of Daling). In contemporary Bhutanese sources, it is Brda-gling-kha ("Gateway to Daling" [of Bhutan]). The fort would continue to serve as a military installation well into the late nineteenth century before felling into disuse: in April 1774, East India Company had it captured for a few days (on behalf of Cooch Behar Raj) before withdrawing; the Anglo-Bhutanese War of 1865 saw heavy action too. As of today, the fort is in ruins.) (Note: The Bhutanese tradition has it that their country was lHo-mon Kha-bzhi (lit. "The Southern Mon Country approachable by Four Gateways"); Dalingkha was the western gateway. This tradition developed during the 17th century, after the unification of Bhutan.)

In 1668, Gaeboo Achyok sought assistance from His Holiness the 5th Dalai Lama, and had an audience with him at Lhasa. Bhutanese expansions had triggered conflicts with the Tibetans on multiple fronts. He expected a favorable response.

Two months later, Tibet sent multiple columns of its army to invade Bhutan in support of Achyok, as well as a certain Nyingma lama of Merak. (Note: These events are sourced from the autobiography of 5th Dalai Lama. The details of the negotiations are not mentioned. Achyok had slipped while making submissions to the Dalai Lama, leading him to forecast his ominous future.) (Note: For details on the Lama of Merak, consult Ardussi 1977, pp. 315-316)

The invasion was unsuccessful for Tibet — and for Achyok, by extension — and the troops had to be withdrawn. (Note: According to autobiographical accounts of the Dalai Lama, the two divisions in charge of invading eastern Bhutan and Bumthang made it. However, the main division tasked with breaching Western Bhutan failed. It is likely that the conflict was confined to Eastern Bhutan and involved negligible fighting; Bhutanese sources don't even record this invasion.)

An armistice was called by the lamas of Tashilhunpo and other monasteries.

In the post-war negotiations, both Tibet and Bhutan claimed Achyok's territory as theirs. Finally, a peace treaty was signed in 1669 which called for observation of the status-quo till 1675.

==== Death ====
Early in 1675, Achyok informed the Tibetans that the Bhutanese were secretly preparing for an all-out offensive against him before the expiry of the peace treaty.

While routine border incursions were commonplace, this was an unprecedented development and the Dalai Lama ordered a preemptive attack, which was carried out, burning a frontier outpost at Tendung. (Note: Sources give varying descriptions of Tendung (Steng gdung rdzong). Ardussi (2011, p. 37) believes it to be in "lower Chumbi [valley]". Phuntsho (2013, p. 225) says it was "a Bhutanese border fort in Tendung, northwest of modern Samtse". Shakabpa (1984, p. 122) says it was "a small district headquarters" called Tendong Dzong. Judging by its vicinity to Achyok's location at Daling, it can be tentatively identified with Tendruk in the Samtse district.)

Protracted diplomatic negotiations, including on the status of Achyok's territory, followed at Phari (var. Phag Ri), with Bhutan claiming all rights to Achyok's territory.

By September 1675, His Holiness the Dalai Lama had unwillingly conceded to Bhutan's hardball tactics. However, in return, he stopped all border-trade with Bhutan.

The stoppage of border trade appears to have fomented local rebellions which was capitalized by Achyok. In response, Bhutan launched military operations but they proved to be little effective with Achyok capturing the frontier outpost of Daling.

Rituals were held in Punakha for the vitalization of Bhutan's forces and by the third month of 1676, the fort was taken back.

Gaeboo Achyok was captured and executed while his territories were annexed. His head and arms were reportedly paraded in public after being staked in a pole.

Gyalsey Tenzin Rabgye even composed a poem of compassion, deeming Achyok to have committed great evil.

== Aftermath ==
With a new regent at helm of affairs in Tibet, Bhutan's capture of Achyok's territories was not favorably received.

War preparations were initiated, and months later, Tibet would mount the largest ever invasion of Bhutan with eleven columns of its army aiming to besiege them from all sides. Tibet fared better than previous attempts but were yet again warded off.

Finally, in 1679, another peace deal was agreed upon and the frontiers settled. Tibetan records mention nothing about this conflict or the deal.

However, the massive expansion of the Gelugpa Monastery of His Holiness the Dalai Lama came soon after, in what has been since interpreted as a deterrent to Bhutanese expansionism. (Note: Sikkim was absent in this conflict — to Mullard, it suggests that the Chogyal was not a contender power in Eastern Sikkim.)

=== Political heir ===
Contrary to popular memory, Gaeboo Achyok was not the last Lepcha "King". A successor to Achyok had emerged by 1680, called "Monpa Adzin" in Bhutanese records. He seems to have not taken any side in the Tibeto-Bhutanese conflict but played off the two sides to unknown results. He partook in the negotiations over land rights in lower Chumbi Valley with the representatives of Tibet and Bhutan. The Bhutanese claim that he took their side in the negotiations, which concluded after over two years in 1687. (Note: This was hardly the end of Bhutan-Tibet conflicts, which continued well into the mid-eighteenth century. As early as 1710, Tibet would mount another expedition against Bhutan after it tried to invade Tawang.)

By 1690, Bhutanese frontier-men, if not the state, seem to have recovered Damsang for they had erected border cairns.

== Legacy ==
Achyok remains a hero to the Lepchas and his birthday — allegedly on 20 December — is commemorated with much fanfare.

In April 2018, both Daling Fort and Damsang Fort were enlisted as heritage sites by West Bengal Heritage Commission.

== Bibliography ==
- Ardussi, John (1977). Bhutan before the British : a historical study (PDF) (Thesis). Australian National University.
- Ardussi, John (2014), "Lepcha Chieftains of the 17th-18th centuries, based on Tibetan and Bhutanese Sources", Aachuley - A Bilingual Journal Illustrating the Lepcha Way of Life
  - Reprinted in Ardussi, John (2020), "Lepcha Chieftains of the 17th-18th centuries, based on Tibetan and Bhutanese Sources" (PDF), Journal of Bhutan Studies, 43: 1–12, ISSN 1608-411X
- Ardussi, John (2011). "Sikkim and Bhutan in the Crosscurrents of Seventeenth and Eighteenth Century Tibetan History". In Anna Balikci-Denjongpa; Alex McKay (eds.). Buddhist Himalaya: Studies in Religion, History and Culture. Vol. II: The Sikkim Papers. Gangtok: Namgyal Institute of Tibetology. pp. 29–42. ISBN 9788192226118.
- Aris, Michael (1979), Bhutan: The Early History of a Himalayan Kingdom, Warminster, England: Aris & Phillips Ltd., ISBN 0-85668-082-6
- Mullard, Saul (2011), Opening the Hidden Land: State Formation and the Construction of Sikkimese History, BRILL, ISBN 978-90-04-20895-7
- Phuntsho, Karma (2013), The History of Bhutan, Random House India, ISBN 978-81-8400-411-3
- Shakabpa, Tsepon Wangchuk Deden (1984) [first published Yale University Press 1967], Tibet: A Political History, New York: Potala Publications, ISBN 0-9611474-0-7
- Shakabpa, Tsepon Wangchuk Deden (2009), One Hundred Thousand Moons: An Advanced Political History of Tibet, BRILL, ISBN 978-90-04-17732-1
- Rai, Rajiv; Gurung, Mahendra Prasad (2020). "Changing Dynamics of Traditional Culture of Sikkim in Different Times: From the Lepcha Era to the Modern Period". In Sarit K. Chaudhuri; Sameera Maiti; Charisma K. Lepcha (eds.). The Cultural Heritage of Sikkim. Delhi: Routledge. ISBN 9781000079227.
- Sundas, Binayak (2020). "The Process of State Formation and its Impact on Social Formation in Eastern Nepal and Sikkim, Sixteenth-nineteenth Centuries". In Sarit K. Chaudhuri; Sameera Maiti; Charisma K. Lepcha (eds.). The Cultural Heritage of Sikkim. Delhi: Routledge. ISBN 9781000079227.
