= Pedong =

- Town
- Location in West Bengal, India
- Coordinates: 27°09′21″N 88°36′47″E
- Country: India
- State: West Bengal
- District: Kalimpong
- Elevation: 1,240 m (4,070 ft)

Population (2011)
  - Total: 4,274

Languages
  - Official: Nepali, English
- Time zone: UTC+5:30 (IST)
- PIN: 734 311
- Telephone code: 03552
- Vehicle registration: WB-78, 79
- Nearest city: Kalimpong
- Website: kalimpongdistrict.in

Pedong is a town in the Pedong CD block in the Kalimpong subdivision of the Kalimpong district in the Indian state of West Bengal. The town is very close to Resi-Sikkim border. Pedong lies on the National Highway-717A connecting Bagrakote to Gangtok via Pakyong Airport.

== Geography ==
Places in the Kalimpong subdivision (Kalimpong district)
CT: census town, R: rural/ urban centre, M: municipality, F: facility, NP: national park
Abbreviations used in names – TG for Tea Garden (town/village)
Owing to space constraints in the small map, the actual locations in a larger map may vary slightly

=== Location ===
Pedong is located at 27.15°N 88.6167°E.

Pedong lies 20 km (12 mi) east of Kalimpong on the way to the Indo-Tibetan border in Sikkim at an altitude of 1,240 m (4,070 ft). The town, which is located on a ridge, commands a panoramic view of the Kanchenjunga and the Himalayan mountains. The town is divided into two parts, Upper Pedong and Lower Pedong. Pedong lies on the Indo-Tibetan trade route via the Jelepla Pass.

=== Area overview ===
The map alongside shows the Kalimpong subdivision, the sole subdivisions of the Kalimpong district. Physiographically, this area forms the Kalimpong Range, with the average elevation varying from 300 to 3,000 metres (980 to 9,840 ft). This region is characterized by abruptly rising hills and numerous small streams. It is a predominantly rural area with 77.67% of the population living in rural areas and only 22.23% living in the urban areas. While Kalimpong is the only municipality, Dungra is the sole census town in the area. The economy is agro-based and there are 6 tea gardens in the Gorubathan CD block. In 2011, Kalimpong subdivision had a literacy rate of 81.85%, comparable with the highest levels of literacy in the districts of the state. While the first degree college in the subdivision was established at Kalimpong in 1962, the entire subdivision (and now the entire district), other than the head-quarters, had to wait till as late as 2015 to have their first degree colleges at Pedong and Gorubathan.

=== Important sights ===
Near Pedong are the ruins of Damsang Gadi, a historical fort built in 1690 AD by the Lepchas. It was at the centre of the long-standing feud with the Dukpas of Bhutan. Later, it was used to ward off the forces of the British East India Company. After the Anglo-Bhutan War of 1864 AD, the fort fell into decay. Damsang Gadi is the only fort in the entire district of Darjeeling. It was home to the last Lepcha King- Gyabo Achuk as the Lepcha people are the real natives of this place.

Another highlight of the town is the Cross Hill, placed by priest Fr. Augustine Desgodins in 1882 AD on his way to Tibet. In the Tibet Mission, a lot of Evangelists lost their lives or never came back from Tibet. Fr. Augustine Desgodins in due memory of them erected a cross at a vantage point facing Tibet directly with a hope that someday the evangelists may return. It is considered to have miraculous powers and is a pilgrimage site for the local Christians. From here one can get a glimpse of Tibet and the People's Republic of Chinese border.

Sangchen Dorjee Monastery is one of the oldest monasteries in the Pedong-Kalimpong region, built during the Bhutanese rule. This monastery was established around the early 1700's AD. It provides historical insight into the history and culture of the place. Known as Sangchen Dorjee Gumba, it also has fresco paintings on the inner walls of the main chamber depicting Tantric Buddhism. Gumpha Dance (Chyaam dance) or the Buddhist Mask dance is also held here annually. It has now become the centre of Shabdrung Rimpoche (known as the Dharma Raja of Bhutan). The last Shabdrung Rimpoche had relocated to Pedong and expired a few years ago. His human form has been preserved at Pedong and will be encased in a Stupa/Chorten on an auspicious day. This place has become an important pilgrimage for the Bhutanese and other followers of the Drukpa Khargu tradition of Buddhism.

The villages near Pedong include Sakyong, Kasyong, Dalep, Kagey, Upper Menchu and Lower Menchu.

== Demographics ==
According to the 2011 Census of India, Pedong Khasmahal had a total population of 4,274 of which 2,153 (50%) were males and 2,121 (50%) were females. There were 443 persons in the age range of 0 to 6 years. The total number of literate people in Pedong Khasmahal was 3,131 (81.73% of the population over 6 years).

== 2015 fire ==
A major fire broke out at the heart of Pedong at midnight on 28 January 2015. Around 17 houses were completely gutted by the fire. Fire brigade services from the nearby towns of Kalimpong and Rangpo, along with the local people and the Army, worked to control the situation which could have otherwise razed most of Pedong. The estimated losses summed to multiple Crores, however, no casualties were reported in the unfortunate incident. Many locals have glorified the valorous act of two brothers, Lobsang and Dawa Bhutia, both residents of Pedong, in the rescue operation. Afterwards, people from near and far visited the town to show solidarity and to provide help and support in all means possible. Many NGOs have also stood up for the cause.

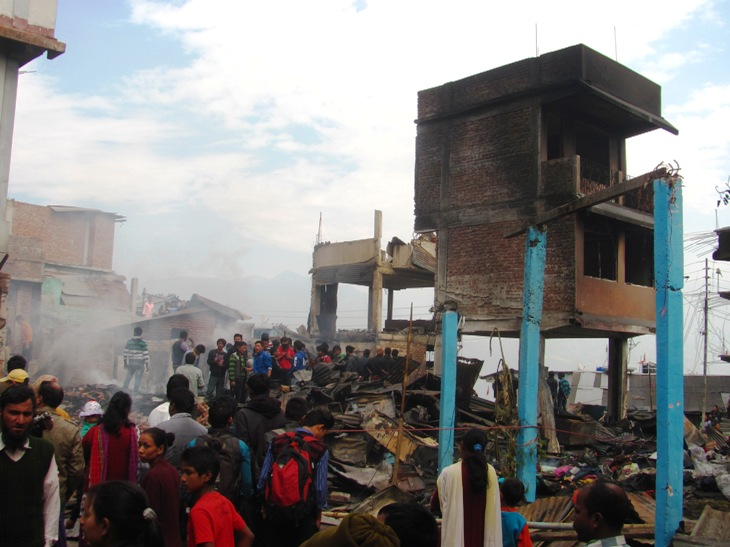
A glimpse of the aftermath of the fire incident that gutted many houses in Pedong on 28 January 2015

== Education ==
Government General Degree College, Pedong, was established in 2015. Affiliated with the University of North Bengal, it offers honours courses in Nepali, English, history, political science, sociology, chemistry, geology, mathematics and physics, and general courses in arts and science.

St. George's Higher Secondary School is a Christian missionary school and one of the famous boarding schools, followed by St Xavier's School, Tender Buds Academy, Grace English School. There are also many nursery schools in this town.

== Transport ==
Pedong lies on the National Highway-717A, connecting Bagrakote to Gangtok, which is extended by NHIDCL. Taxis, Jeeps, and buses are available from Pedong to cities and towns like Kalimpong, Algarah, Rhenock, Labha, Rongli, Gorubathan, and Siliguri.

Pakyong Airport is 50 km (31 mi) away from the town, and Bagdogra International Airport is 99 km (62 mi) away. The nearest railway station is Malbazar Junction.

== Flora and fauna ==
Pedong is rich in avifauna. Various species of Himalayan and lowland birds can be seen around Pedong.

== Healthcare ==
Pedong Rural Hospital, with 30 beds, is the major government medical facility in the Kalimpong II CD block. There are primary health centres at Gitdubling (with 6 beds) and Algarah (with 2 beds).

== Infrastructure ==
Pedong is well connected with roads as the only medium of transport. Power and mobile network outage is common, almost daily. A very poor connectivity when compared to other small towns. Only a few network providers are available, mainly Airtel, Vi, Jio, and BSNL. Scarcity of drinking water can be experienced in summer, as is usual in Darjeeling & Kalimpong.
