= National Highway 717A (India) =

National highway in India

National Highway 717A
- Map of the National Highway 717A in red

Route information
- Length: 200 km (120 mi)

Major junctions
- South end: Bagrakote, West Bengal
- North end: Gangtok, Sikkim

Location
- Country: India
- States: West Bengal, Sikkim
- Districts: Jalpaiguri District, Kalimpong District, Pakyong District, Gangtok District
- Primary destinations: Bagrakote - Chuikhim - Nimbong Bazaar - Loleygaon - Lava - Algarah - Pedong - Rhenock - Rorathang - Pakyong Airport - Pakyong Bazaar - Ranipool - Gangtok.

Highway system
- Roads in India; Expressways; National; State; Asian
← NH 17	→ NH 10

National Highway 717A, commonly referred to as NH 717A is a National Highway in India which is a part of the Bharatmala Pariyojana of Ministry of Road Transport and Highways, Government of India. NH 717-A starts from National Highway 17 at Bagrakote and ends in Gangtok. NH-717A traverses the states of West Bengal and Sikkim in India. It runs through two districts of West Bengal (Jalpaiguri district and Kalimpong district) and two of Sikkim (Pakyong District and Gangtok District). The highway is being constructed and maintained by the National Highways and Infrastructure Development Corporation Limited (NHIDCL).

NH 17

The view before reaching Kaffer, Kalimpong district, West Bengal, along the route of 717A connecting Bagrakote to Gangtok.

== Current Route ==
=== West Bengal ===
Bagrakote - Selroti Bridge - Chuikhim - Nimbong Bazaar - Loleygaon - Lava 9th Mile - Algarah Bypass - Pedong - Kataray - West Bengal-Sikkim Rishi Border.

=== Sikkim ===
West Bengal-Sikkim Rishi Border - Rhenock Bypass - Rorathang - Pacheykhani - Pakyong Airport Bypass - Pakyong Bazaar - Ranipool - Gangtok.

== Old Route ==
The earlier alignment of NH717A used to start from Damdim More on National Highway 17 & going via Gorubathan, Ambeok Tea Garden, Pankhasari, Lava, Pedong, Rhenock, Rorathang & Pakyong ending on National Highway 10 at Ranipool covering 138 kilometres (86 mi) distance. Since this route is prone to Landslides & Blockades, NHAI is making alternate All weather route via Bagrakote - Selroti Bridge - Chuikhim - Nimbong Bazaar - Loleygaon.

== Junctions ==
Terminal near Bagrakote.

NH 717B Terminal near Rhenock.
NH 10 Terminal near Gangtok.

== See also ==
- List of national highways in India
- List of national highways in India by state
