= Bagrakote =

Bagrakote Bagrakot Tea Garden
- Village
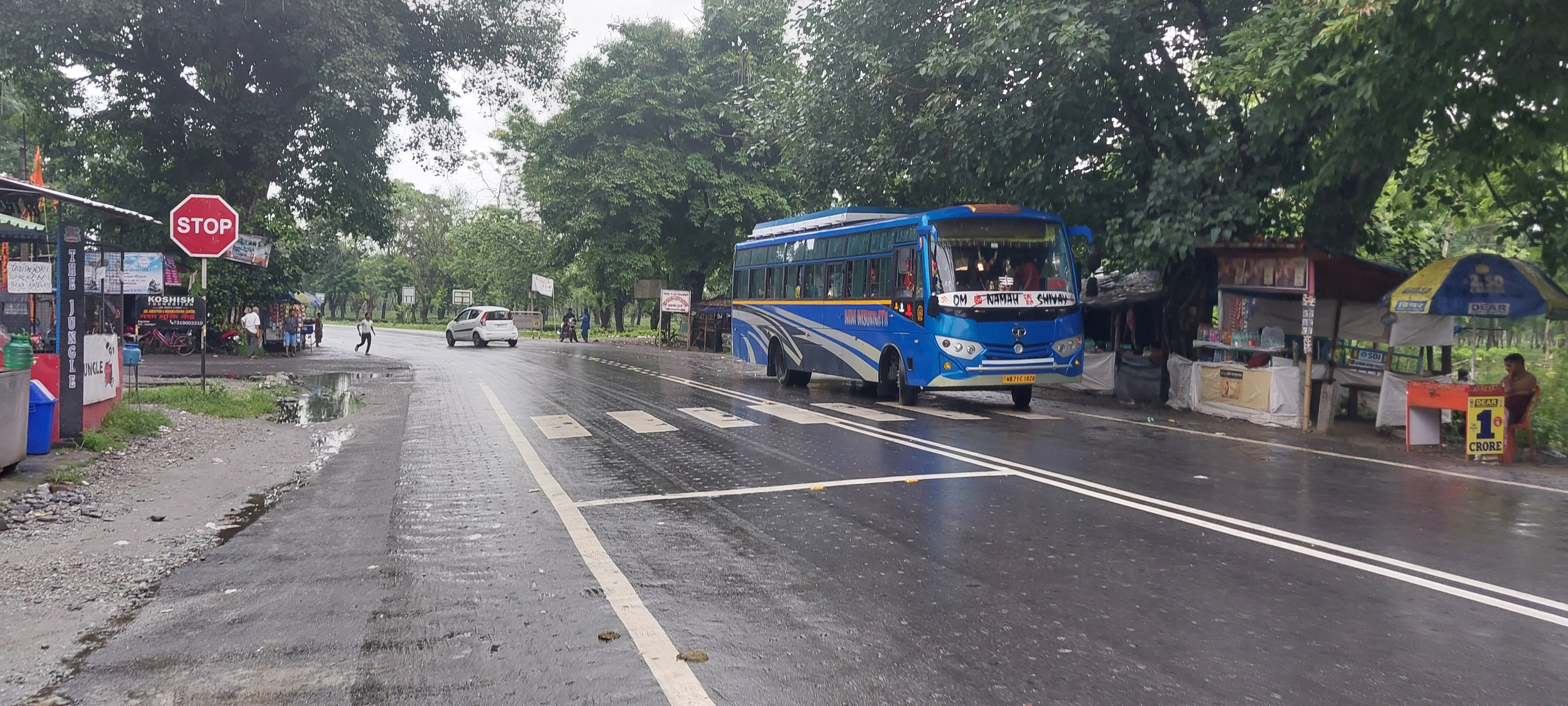
- Bagrakote bus stand

- Location in West Bengal, India Bagrakote (India)
- Coordinates: 26.8994°N 88.5846°E
- Country: India
- State: West Bengal
- District: Jalpaiguri

Population (2011)
  - Total: 9,971
- Time zone: UTC+5:30 (IST)
- PIN: 734501
- Telephone/STD code: 03562
- Vehicle registration: WB
- Lok Sabha constituency: Jalpaiguri
- Vidhan Sabha constituency: Mal
- Website: jalpaiguri.gov.in

Bagrakote is a village in the Mal CD block in the Malbazar subdivision of the Jalpaiguri district in the state of West Bengal, India. The main reason behind Bagrakote being called as a Tea Garden is that it was by the virtue of the Duncan Goenka Group that established a tea garden in Bagrakote providing a stable livelihood. People from neighbouring villages and even some far off places like Sikkim have migrated to Bagrakote (mainly post independence). Bagrakote is the starting point of NH 717A, which traverses out of NH 17.

== Geography ==
Places and tea estates in Malbabazar subdivision (including Mal, Nagrakata and Matiali CD blocks) in Jalpaiguri district
CT: census town, R: rural/ urban centre, N: neighbourhood, NP: national park/ wildlife sanctuary, TE: tea estate
Abbreviations used in names – TG for Tea Garden (town/village), TE for Tea Estate, JRS: junction railway station
Owing to space constraints in the small map, the actual locations in a larger map may vary slightly

=== Location ===
Bagrakot Tea Garden is located at 26.8994°N 88.5846°E.

=== Area overview ===
Gorumara National Park has overtaken traditionally popular Jaldapara National Park in footfall and Malbazar has emerged as one of the most important towns in the Dooars. Malbazar subdivision is presented in the map alongside. It is a predominantly rural area with 88.62% of the population living in rural areas and 11.32% living in the urban areas. Tea gardens in the Dooars and Terai regions produce 226 million kg or over a quarter of India's total tea crop. Some tea gardens were identified in the 2011 census as census towns or villages. Such places are marked in the map as CT (census town) or R (rural/ urban centre). Specific tea estate pages are marked TE.

Note: The map alongside presents some of the notable locations in the subdivision. All places marked in the map are linked in the larger full screen map.

== Demographics ==
According to the 2011 Census of India, Bagrakot Tea Garden had a total population of 9,971. There were 4,907 (49%) males and 5,064 (51%) females. There were 895 persons in the age range of 0 to 6 years. The total number of literate people in Bagrakot Tea Garden was 6,878 (75.78% of the population over 6 years).

== Economy ==
Bagrakote Tea Garden was established in 1876 and was shut down in 2015. The tea plantation is now a jungle. One of the reasons for the adverse situation in the tea gardens is that India is losing out in the international market to other countries, such as Kenya, Sri Lanka, Indonesia and even Bangladesh, who have lower cost of production. Within the country tea prices have been stagnant, while costs have risen by 60 per cent in five years prior to 2015.

Bagrakot and 13 other tea gardens belonging to the Goenka Duncan group have virtually been closed down or “abandoned” as some say. There are 8 other gardens, which are closed for years. There are 154 gardens in the Dooars out of 283 tea gardens in north Bengal that employ 3.5 lakh workers.

Bagracote Tea Estate has 489.95 hectares of mature tea and 1.32 hectares of young tea. In 1998–99, it produced 1.416 million kg of tea.

== Tourism ==
Bagrakote is a village, 4 km from Odlabari, surrounded by forests and tea gardens, with an exquisite view of the Himalayan mountains. Those who are lucky, particularly on a winter morning, can also have a glimpse of Kangchenjunga. It has trekking routes, particularly the one to Loleygaon. This off-beat destination has started attracting tourists. However There is a downward trend in Tourist citings around the region as the main attraction for them, i.e. the Tea Garden has not been doing soo well and the area is predominantly covered with huge bushes and uncleaned vegetation.

== Transport ==
Bagrakote Railway Station which lies on New Jalpaiguri–Alipurduar–Samuktala Road line of Northeast Frontier Railway zone Alipurduar railway division serves the areas of Bagrakote and nearby tea gardens.Bagrakote is the starting point of National Highway 717A which traverses out of National Highway 17.

== Military Activity ==
Given the increasing military activity over the last decade by China north and north-east of the Sino-Indian border from Sikkim, Indian authorities have initiated parallel upgrades of men and material in the area by strengthening the road network to and along the border in the east and the northeast sectors. The landslide-prone national highway NH-31A connecting Sikkim with the rest of the country has been widened and strengthened. An ordnance depot has been set up by the Indian Army at Bagrakote Military Station and land acquired by them to build an airstrip there. Tenders were floated for special repairs to military installations in March 2021.
