= Pakyong Airport =

Airport in Sikkim, India

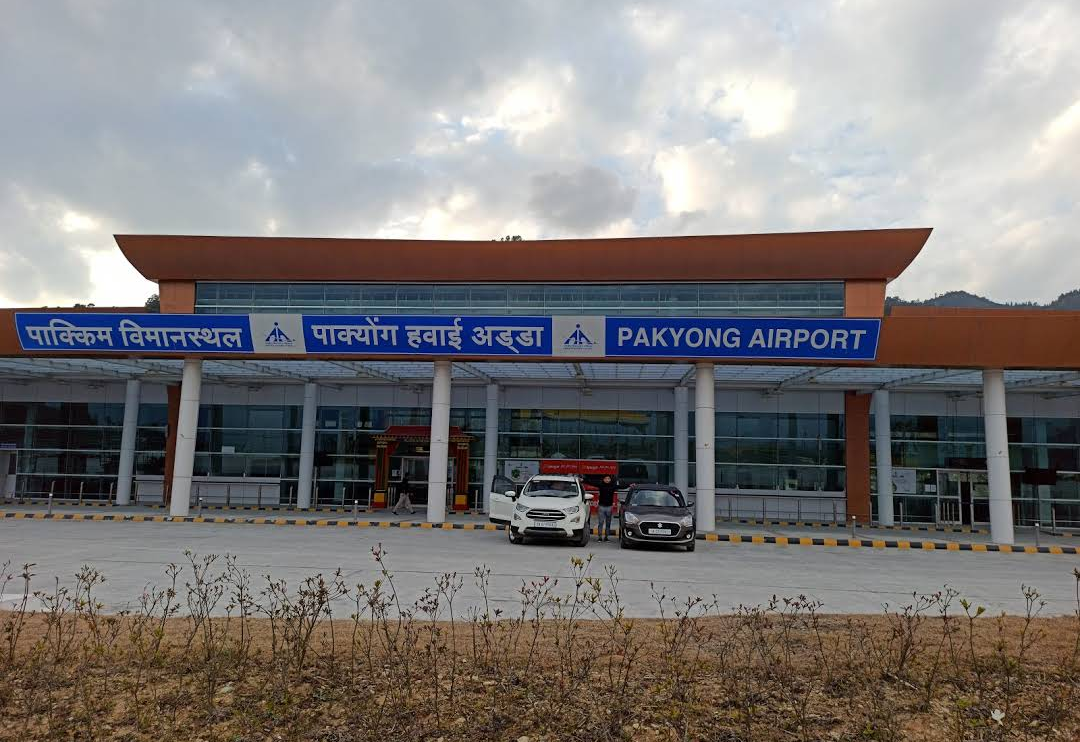
- IATA: PYG; ICAO: VEPY

Summary
- Airport type: Public
- Owner: Government of India
- Operator: Airports Authority of India
- Serves: Gangtok
- Location: Pakyong, Pakyong district, Sikkim, India
- Opened: 24 September 2018; 8 years ago
- Time zone: Indian Standard Time (+5:30)
- Elevation AMSL: 1,416 m (4,646 ft)
- Coordinates: 27°13′57″N 88°35′18″E
- Website: Pakyong Airport

Map
- Location in Sikkim PYG (India)

Runways
Direction	Length		Surface
Direction	m	ft	Surface
02/20	1,700	5,577	Concrete

Statistics (April 2025 - March 2026)
- Passengers: 0 (▼100%)
- Aircraft movements: 0 (▼100%)
- Cargo tonnage: —
- Sources: AAI

Pakyong Airport (IATA: PYG, ICAO: VEPY) is a domestic airport serving Gangtok, the capital of Sikkim, India. It has been operationalized under the UDAN Scheme of the Government of India. Spread over 201 acres (81 ha), the airport is located at Pakyong, about 31 km (22 mi) south of Gangtok. At 4,646 ft, the airport is one of the five highest airports in India. It is also the first greenfield airport constructed in Northeast India, the 100th operational airport in India, and the only airport in the state of Sikkim.

Inaugurated on 24 September 2018 by Prime Minister Narendra Modi, commercial flight operations started 4 October 2018. Upon its opening, CNN described it as one of the most scenic airports in the world. However, commercial flights have been disrupted due to known weather conditions, being originally planned and designed as a Visual Flight Rules (VFR) Airport. Due to these visibility issues along with agitation from the local villagers who were displaced and strip area issues, the airport's only commercial passenger airline SpiceJet suspended flight operations to the airport effective 1 June 2019. After a suspension of 19 months, flight operations resumed on 23 January 2021, following the establishment of Required Navigation Performance (RNP) approaches. However, the resumption proved short lived and at present there are no operational flights from Pakyong.

== History ==
Prior to the construction of Pakyong Airport, Sikkim had been the sole state in India possessing no functional airport. Previously, the nearest airports used to access Sikkim were Bagdogra, located 124 km (77 mi) (and a five-hour drive) away in the neighboring state of West Bengal, and Paro Airport in Bhutan.

The project to develop Pakyong Airport was approved by the Cabinet Committee on Economic Affairs in October 2008. The Punj Lloyd Group was awarded the ₹2,640 million (equivalent to ₹4.0 billion or US$42 million in 2026) contract to construct a runway, taxiway, apron drainage system, and electrical work for the greenfield airport in January 2009. The foundation stone for the greenfield airport was laid by the then Civil Aviation Minister, Praful Patel, in February 2009.

The project was initially slated to be completed by 2012, but protests by local villagers, demanding proper rehabilitation and compensation, had resulted in suspension of work in January 2014. The AAI intervened and held discussions with agitating villagers and paid part compensation allowing work to resume in October 2014. However, in January 2015, work came to a halt once again as villagers took to protests. In July 2015, AAI and the State Government signed an MoU with AAI, promising to shift the affected households by 15 August so that AAI could resume work from October 2015. These protest-related delays and landslides upslope of the runway resulted in suspension of work twice, escalating costs from ₹3,090 million (equivalent to ₹4.7 billion or US$49 million in 2026) to ₹6,050 million (equivalent to ₹9.3 billion or US$96 million in 2026). Maximally ecological slope-stabilization techniques were used to remedy the landslide situation.

On 5 March 2018, an IAF Dornier 228 landed on the completed airstrip, becoming the first aircraft to land at Pakyong. SpiceJet had been awarded the Pakyong to Kolkata and Guwahati sectors under the second round of bidding for the Government's UDAN Regional Connectivity Scheme in January 2018 and it conducted a trial landing of its Q400 aircraft after getting approval from DGCA for M/s SpiceJet at Pakyong on 10 March 2018. The airport received its commercial operating license from the Directorate General of Civil Aviation (DGCA) on 5 May 2018.

On 5 December 2019, 35 families affected by the airport's construction signed off on a joint agreement and accepted the first installment in compensation for their loss of land bringing years of protest to a close.

== Structure ==
The airport was built by the AAI at an estimated cost of 605 crore featuring a 1,700 m × 30 m (5,577 ft × 98 ft) runway and a 116 m (381 ft) long taxiway connecting it to an apron measuring 106 by 76 metres (348 ft × 249 ft) that can accommodate two ATR 72 aircraft at a time.

A terminal building measuring 2,380 m^{2} (25,600 sq ft) with a capacity of 100 passengers, a car park for 80 vehicles and a fire station cum Air Traffic Control Tower was constructed by Ms PABSCON. Navigation facilities include DVOR, High Intensity Runway Lights (HIRL), Aerodrome beacon, and a PAPI.

The Pakyong Airport project is one of the tallest reinforced soil structures in the world. The land for the airport was carved from the mountainside using massive geotechnical 'cut and fill' engineering works. These state-of-the-art geogrid soil reinforcement and slope stabilisation techniques were employed as traditional retaining structures and embankments were ruled out as being unfeasible. Italian geotechnical company Maccaferri given consultancy services to execute the project that envisaged a 150 m (490 ft) wide, 2 km (1.2 mi) long corridor on which the runway and airport buildings were to be constructed. The company, which completed the project with partners Mott MacDonald and Punj Lloyd, won the 'International Project of the Year' award at the Ground Engineering Awards 2012 for its work in constructing 74 m (243 ft) high reinforced soil walls and slopes at the site.

== Commercial flight operations ==
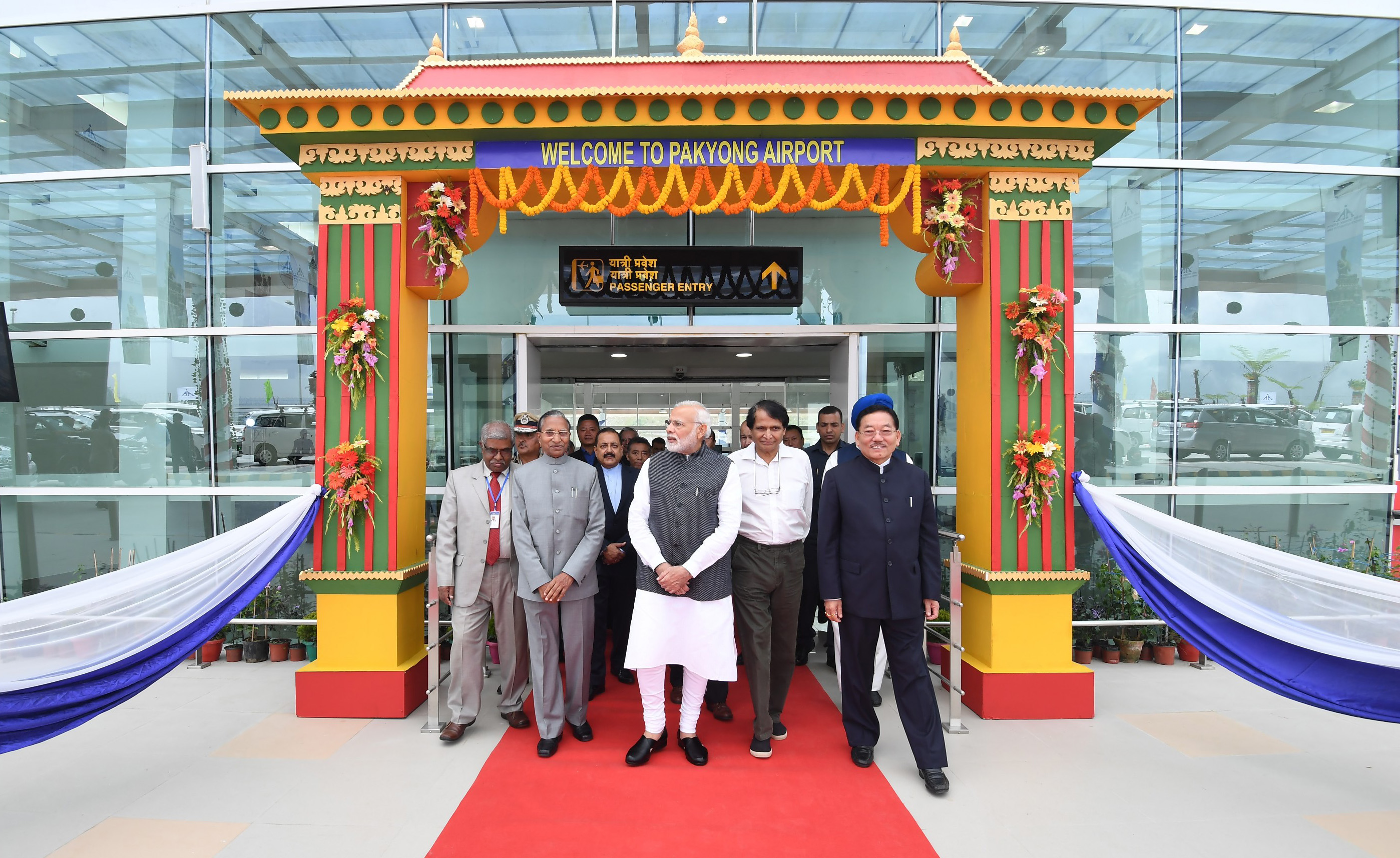
Modi at the inauguration of the Pakyong Airport

Although initially praised upon its opening by CNN as being "a breathtaking piece of engineering on the roof of the world" offering arriving passengers "one of the most dramatic airport approaches on the planet", the airport's commercial flight operations have since been disrupted by poor weather conditions affecting flight visibility and known issues with engineering. In December 2018, 21 of SpiceJet's 31 daily flights (nearly 70% of its schedule) were forced to divert to Bagdogra (up to a five-hour drive away) because Pakyong "lacked the requisite navigation equipment for low-visibility situations", being a Visual flight rule (VFR) Airport as originally planned as per MOU 2002 & MOU 2015 among Civil Aviation GOI, Tourism Deptt Govt of Sikkim and AAI. Currently, Pakyong requires at least 5 km (5,000m)under Visual flight rule (VFR) conditions for Non-Schedule Airlines. For schedule flight operations by SpiceJet Required navigation performance (RNP) procedure was approved by DGCA with visibility requirement of 2,400m.

On 1 June 2019, SpiceJet, the airport's sole airline providing commercial passenger service, temporarily suspended its once daily Kolkata-Pakyong-Kolkata flight due to "unpredictable weather in Pakyong which results in very low visibility", having earlier suspended the other daily service between Pakyong and Guwahati. Airline officials also cited the approaching monsoon season's aggravating effect on flight operations when announcing the service suspension. SpiceJet earlier conveyed that they will restart flight operation with effect from winter schedule i.e., 27 October 2019, however, the flight operations remained suspended for the rest of the year and 2020.

In addition to fluctuating weather, adequate basic strip area (western side) issues have also hampered commercial flight operations. The basic strip, which is mandated to be a minimum of 75 m wide, is only 40 m in western side & 80m wide Eastern side along 2 km long. Contractors have been "unable to take up Civil works to extend the stretch of basic strip and erect a strong RCC Retaining wall with anchoring system" because the State Government of Sikkim at the time had not compensated few of the affected landowners. On 5 December 2019, it was reported that 35 families affected by the airport's construction had been offered a compensation of 20.6 crore by the State Government and that there would be support in ensuring the full completion and operation of the airport. On 18 November 2020, a trial landing was conducted at the airport by SpiceJet involving a Required navigation performance (RNP) procedure and commercial flight operations resumed on 23 January 2021 after a suspension of 19 months. Upon its resumption, the first ever Delhi-Pakyong direct flight started from 23 January 2021 while flights to Kolkata resumed on 1 February 2021. After suspension of both services in October 2022, flight services temporarily resumed in March 2023 with SpiceJet connecting Delhi. This has since been discontinued. There are currently no scheduled commercial flights in operation or open for booking from Pakyong.

== Statistics ==
Operations and statistics
Year	Passengers	Aircraft
2018-19	18,963	328
2019-20	3,749	60
2020-21	11,494	194
2021-22	44,740	754
2022-23	15,707	324
2023-24	8,417	170
2024-25	11,111	188
2025-26	0	0

== Passenger amenities ==
Pakyong Airport has snack bar, Prepaid Taxi counter for passengers within its premises. Prepaid taxis can be availed on a very reasonable rate to visit nearby cities like Gangtok, Namchi, Mangan, Pelling etc. or any other tourist places of Sikkim on hiring basis. The airport is just 1 kilometre away from NH717A at Pakyong.

== Military flight operations ==
As Pakyong Airport sits approximately 60 km (37.28 mi) from the India-China border, it is considered strategically important. In March 2018, the Indian Air Force (IAF) was the first to land an aircraft, a Dornier 228, at the airport. And in January 2019, an IAF Antonov-32 transport plane arrived "in an effort to boost the transportation of troops and material to this region." At present security is being provided by State government of Sikkim as per MoU dated 30.6.2015 signed among Government of Sikkim, Ministry of Civil Aviation, Government of India and Airports Authority of India.

Government audit and report findings

The major points of concern identified in government audits and local reports include:

- Avoidable Expenditure & Cost Overruns: A 2023 CAG report highlighted that an "improper slope-cutting design" led to major cracks in nearby houses and land subsidence. This resulted in ₹314.53 crorein avoidable costs for compensation to locals, extra mitigation works, and stalling of construction.
- Poor Planning & Oversight: Audits noted mismanagement in the construction phase, including the building of an Air Traffic Control (ATC) tower in a location that was "blinded" by parked planes, forcing a rebuild at an additional cost of ₹21 million.
- Compensation Disputes: Local residents have repeatedly alleged that the Airports Authority of India (AAI) claimed compensation funds were handed over to the Sikkim government, yet many families who lost homes and farmland reported they did not receive their full dues.
- Contractor Issues: There have been local allegations regarding incomplete infrastructure funded under Corporate Social Responsibility (CSR) grants, where contractors allegedly received payments without finishing the work, leading to public outcry about "mass corruption" in local project execution.
- Institutional Risks in State Governance: Recent CAG reports (late 2025/early 2026) have flagged broader "serious institutional risks" and "irregular" selection processes with possible fraud and favoritism within other state bodies like the State Bank of Sikkim, fueling a general climate of distrust regarding how large-scale state projects are managed.

== See also ==
Military bases

- List of ALGs
- List of Indian Air Force stations
- India-China military deployment on LAC
- List of disputed India-China areas
- Tianwendian
- Ukdungle

Borders

- Line of Actual Control (LAC)
- Borders of China
- Borders of India

Other related topics

- India-China Border Roads
- List of extreme points of India
- Defence Institute of High Altitude Research
