= Geni, Siliguri =

Geni
- Census Town
- Location in West Bengal, India Geni (India)
- Coordinates: 26.68313°N 88.20961°E
- Country: India
- State: West Bengal
- District: Darjeeling

Area
  - Total: 2.3553 km^{2} (0.9094 sq mi)

Population (2011)
  - Total: 8,747
  - Density: 3,714/km^{2} (9,619/sq mi)

Languages
  - Official: Bengali, English
- Time zone: UTC+5:30 (IST)
- PIN: 734429
- Telephone/STD code: 0353
- Vehicle registration: WB
- Lok Sabha constituency: Darjeeling
- Vidhan Sabha constituency: Matigara-Naxalbari
- Website: darjeeling.gov.in

Geni is a census town in the Naxalbari CD block in the Siliguri subdivision of Darjeeling district in the state of West Bengal, India.

== Geography ==
Places in the south-western portion of Siliguri subdivision in Darjeeling district
CT: census town, R: rural/ urban centre, F: facilities
Owing to space constraints in the small map, the actual locations in a larger map may vary slightly

=== Location ===
Geni is located at 26.68313°N 88.20961°E.

Geni and Bhimram are adjacent to Naxalbari as per map of Naxalbari CD block on page 291 of the District Census Handbook, Darjeeling.

=== Area overview ===
The map alongside shows the Siliguri subdivision of Darjeeling district. This area is spread across the foothills of the Himalayas and is a plain land gently sloping from north to south. While the northern part is mentioned as the Terai region, the larger southern portion forms the western part of the Dooars region. While 55.11% per cent of the population resides in the rural areas, 44.89% resides in the urban areas. On the western side the Mechi River forms a long border with Nepal. On the eastern side the Mahananda River forms a short border with Bangladesh.

Note: The map alongside presents some of the notable locations in the subdivision. All places marked in the map are linked in the larger full screen map.

== Demographics ==
According to the 2011 Census of India, Geni had a total population of 8,747 of which 4,459 (51%) were males and 4,288 (49%) were females. There were 869 persons in the age range of 0 to 6 years. The total number of literate people in Geni was 6,332 (72.39% of the population over 6 years).

== Infrastructure ==
According to the District Census Handbook 2011, Darjiling, Geni covered an area of 2.3553 km^{2}. Among the civic amenities, the protected water supply involved tap water from treated sources and covered wells, it had 1,850 domestic electric connections and 400 road light points. Among the medical facilities, it had 2 medicine shops in the town and a number of facilities in places nearby. Among the educational facilities it had were 3 primary schools, 1 middle school, 3 secondary schools, 1 senior secondary school, the nearest general degree college at Budhkaran, 0.5 km away. It had 1 non-formal education centre (Sarba Siksha Abhiyan).
