= Dumriguri =

- Census Town
- Location in West Bengal, India Dumriguri (India)
- Coordinates: 26.708032°N 88.326167°E
- Country: India 26.708032 88.326167
- State: West Bengal
- District: Darjeeling

Area
  - Total: 2.7033 km^{2} (1.0437 sq mi)

Population (2011)
  - Total: 13,416
  - Density: 4,962.8/km^{2} (12,854/sq mi)

Languages
  - Official: Bengali, English
- Time zone: UTC+5:30 (IST)
- PIN: 734429
- Telephone/STD code: 0353
- Vehicle registration: WB
- Lok Sabha constituency: Darjeeling
- Vidhan Sabha constituency: Matigara-Naxalbari
- Website: darjeeling.gov.in

Dumriguri is a census town in the Naxalbari CD block in the Siliguri subdivision of Darjeeling district in the state of West Bengal, India.

== Geography ==
Places in the south-western portion of Siliguri subdivision in Darjeeling district
CT: census town, R: rural/ urban centre, F: facilities
Owing to space constraints in the small map, the actual locations in a larger map may vary slightly

=== Location ===
Dumriguri is located at 26.708032°N 88.326167°E.

Dumriguri, Uttar Bagdogra and Lalman form a cluster of census towns as per map of Naxalbari CD block on page 291 of the District Census Handbook, Darjeeling.

=== Area overview ===
The map alongside shows the Siliguri subdivision of Darjeeling district. This area is spread across the foothills of the Himalayas and is a plain land gently sloping from north to south. While the northern part is mentioned as the Terai region, the larger southern portion forms the western part of the Dooars region. While 55.11% per cent of the population resides in the rural areas, 44.89% resides in the urban areas. On the western side the Mechi River forms a long border with Nepal. On the eastern side the Mahananda River forms a short border with Bangladesh.

Note: The map alongside presents some of the notable locations in the subdivision. All places marked in the map are linked in the larger full screen map.

== Demographics ==
According to the 2011 Census of India, Dumriguri had a total population of 13,416 of which 6,961 (52%) were males and 6,465 (48%) were females. There were 1,340 persons in the age range of 0 to 6 years. The total number of literate people in Dumriguri was 10,425 (77.71% of the population over 6 years).

== Infrastructure ==
According to the District Census Handbook 2011, Darjiling, Dumriguri covered an area of 2.7033 km^{2}. Among the civic amenities, it had 3 km roads with open drains, the protected water supply involved tap water from treated sources and covered wells, it had 2,928 domestic electric connections and 150 road lighting points. Among the medical facilities, it had the nearest dispensary/ health centre, maternity and child welfare centres, maternity clinics, 1 km away. Among the educational facilities it had were 4 primary schools, 1 middle school, 1 secondary school, the nearest senior secondary school at Sree Colony, 0.2 km away, the nearest general degree college at Buridalson, 4 km away. It had 1 non-formal education centre (Sarba Siksha Abhiyan). It had the branch of 1 nationalised bank.
