= Shyamdhan =

- Census Town
- Location within West Bengal Location within India
- Coordinates: 26.5979°N 88.1669°E
- Country: India
- State: West Bengal
- District: Darjeeling
- Subdivision: Siliguri

Government
  - Type: Gram panchayat
  - Body: Raniganjpanishali G.P.

Area
  - Total: 1.5338 km^{2} (0.5922 sq mi)
- Elevation: 2.4 m (7.9 ft)

Population
  - Total: 5,192
- Time zone: UTC+5:30 (IST)
- PIN: 734427/734428
- Telephone code: +91-05522
- Vehicle registration: WB
- Lok Sabha constituency: Darjeeling
- Vidhan Sabha constituency: Phansidewa
- Website: darjeeling.gov.in

Shyamdhan is a census town in the Kharibari CD block in the Siliguri subdivision of Darjeeling district in the state of West Bengal, India.

== Geography ==
Places in the south-western portion of Siliguri subdivision in Darjeeling district
CT: census town, R: rural/ urban centre, F: facilities
Owing to space constraints in the small map, the actual locations in a larger map may vary slightly

=== Location ===
Shyamdhan is located at 26.5979°N 88.1669°E.

Shyamdhan is shown as a CT (census town) in the map of Kharibari CD block on page 363 of the District Census Handbook, Darjiling, 2011. Batasi is not identified as a separate populated area in the 2011 census.

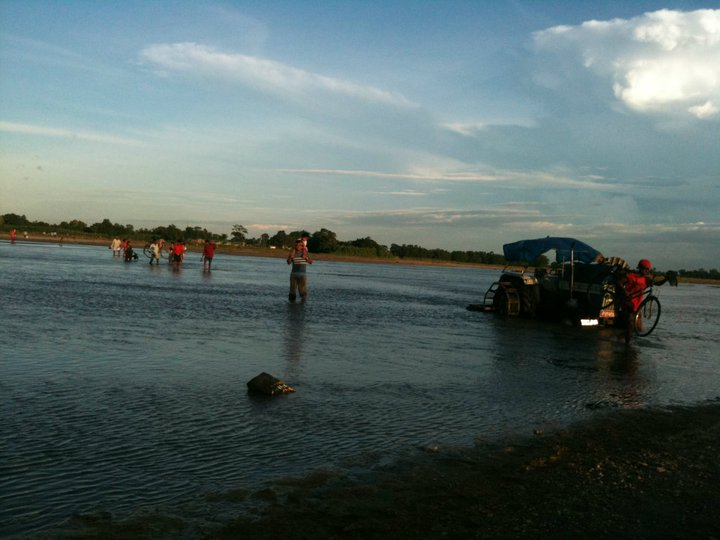
Mechi River

=== Area overview ===
The map alongside shows the Siliguri subdivision of Darjeeling district. This area is spread across the foothills of the Himalayas and is a plain land gently sloping from north to south. While the northern part is mentioned as the Terai region, the larger southern portion forms the western part of the Dooars region. While 55.11% per cent of the population resides in the rural areas, 44.89% resides in the urban areas. On the western side the Mechi River forms a long border with Nepal. On the eastern side the Mahananda River forms a short border with Bangladesh.

Note: The map alongside presents some of the notable locations in the subdivision. All places marked in the map are linked in the larger full screen map.

== Demographics ==
According to the 2011 Census of India, Shyamdhan had a total population of 5,192 of which 2,655 (51%) were males and 2,537 (49%) were females. There were 533persons in the age range of 0 to 6 years. The total number of literate people in Shyamdhan was 3,745 (72.13% of the population over 6 years).

== Infrastructure ==
According to the District Census Handbook 2011, Darjiling, Shyamdhan covered an area of 1.5338 km^{2}. Among the civic amenities, the protected water supply involved tap water from uncovered well, tubewell/ borehole, it had 1,085 domestic electric connections and 56 road light points. Among the medical facilities, it had 1 hospital, 2 maternity and child welfare centres, 1 veterinary hospital and 7 medicine shops. Among the educational facilities it had were 3 primary schools, 1 secondary school, the nearest senior secondary school at Betai 0.5 km away, the nearest general degree collegel at Bagdogra 25 km away. Among the social, cultural and recreational facilities, it had 1 auditorium/ community hall, 1 public library, 1 reading room. It had the branch of 1 nationalised bank.

== Transport ==
There is a station at Batasi on the Katihar-Siliguri line. It is 31.6 km from Siliguri.
