= Lalman =

- Census Town
- Location in West Bengal, India Lalman (India)
- Coordinates: 26.697032°N 88.350167°E
- Country: India
- State: West Bengal
- District: Darjeeling

Area
  - Total: 3.4034 km^{2} (1.3141 sq mi)

Population (2011)
  - Total: 6,894
  - Density: 2,026/km^{2} (5,246/sq mi)

Languages
  - Official: Bengali, English
- Time zone: UTC+5:30 (IST)
- PIN: 734429
- Telephone/STD code: 0353
- Vehicle registration: WB
- Lok Sabha constituency: Darjeeling
- Vidhan Sabha constituency: Matigara-Naxalbari
- Website: darjeeling.gov.in

Lalman is a census town in the Naxalbari CD block in the Siliguri subdivision of Darjeeling district in the state of West Bengal, India.

== Geography ==
Places in the south-western portion of Siliguri subdivision in Darjeeling district
CT: census town, R: rural/ urban centre, F: facilities
Owing to space constraints in the small map, the actual locations in a larger map may vary slightly

=== Location ===
Lalman is located at 26.697032°N 88.350167°E.

Dumriguri, Uttar Bagdogra and Lalman form a cluster of census towns as per map of Naxalbari CD block on page 291 of the District Census Handbook, Darjeeling.

=== Area overview ===
The map alongside shows the Siliguri subdivision of Darjeeling district. This area is spread across the foothills of the Himalayas and is a plain land gently sloping from north to south. While the northern part is mentioned as the Terai region, the larger southern portion forms the western part of the Dooars region. While 55.11% per cent of the population resides in the rural areas, 44.89% resides in the urban areas. On the western side the Mechi River forms a long border with Nepal. On the eastern side the Mahananda River forms a short border with Bangladesh.

Note: The map alongside presents some of the notable locations in the subdivision. All places marked in the map are linked in the larger full screen map.

== Demographics ==
According to the 2011 Census of India, Lalman had a total population of 6,894 of which 3,590 (52%) were males and 3,504 (48%) were females. There were 771 persons in the age range of 0 to 6 years. The total number of literate people in Lalman was 4,902 (71.11% of the population over 6 years).

== Infrastructure ==
According to the District Census Handbook 2011, Darjiling, Lalman covered an area of 3.4034 km^{2}. Among the civic amenities, it had 5 km roads with open drains, the protected water supply involved tap water from covered well, tubewell/ borehole, it had 634 domestic electric connections and 40 road light points. Among the medical facilities, it had 4 medicine shops. Among the educational facilities it had were 3 primary schools, the nearest middle school at Shibmandir 3 km away, the nearest secondary school at Gossainpara 2 km away, the nearest senior secondary school at Baf 5 km away, the nearest general degree college at Buridalson 4 km away. It had 3 non-formal education centres (Sarba Siksha Abhiyan).
