= Dakshin Bagdogra =

- Census Town
- Location in West Bengal, India Dakshin Bagdogra (India)
- Coordinates: 26.6796°N 88.3164°E
- Country: India
- State: West Bengal
- District: Darjeeling

Area
  - Total: 1.4609 km^{2} (0.5641 sq mi)

Population (2011)
  - Total: 2,647
  - Density: 1,812/km^{2} (4,693/sq mi)

Languages
  - Official: Bengali, English
- Time zone: UTC+5:30 (IST)
- PIN: 734014
- Telephone/STD code: 0353
- Vehicle registration: WB
- Lok Sabha constituency: Darjeeling
- Vidhan Sabha constituency: Matigara-Naxalbari
- Website: darjeeling.gov.in

Dakshin Bagdogra is a census town in the Naxalbari CD block in the Siliguri subdivision of Darjeeling district in the state of West Bengal, India.

== Geography ==
Places in the south-western portion of Siliguri subdivision in Darjeeling district
CT: census town, R: rural/ urban centre, F: facilities
Owing to space constraints in the small map, the actual locations in a larger map may vary slightly

=== Location ===
Dakshin Bagdogra is located at 26.6796°N 88.3164°E.

=== Area overview ===
The map alongside shows the Siliguri subdivision of Darjeeling district. This area is spread across the foothills of the Himalayas and is a plain land gently sloping from north to south. While the northern part is mentioned as the Terai region, the larger southern portion forms the western part of the Dooars region. While 55.11% per cent of the population resides in the rural areas, 44.89% resides in the urban areas. On the western side the Mechi River forms a long border with Nepal. On the eastern side the Mahananda River forms a short border with Bangladesh.

Note: The map alongside presents some of the notable locations in the subdivision. All places marked in the map are linked in the larger full screen map.

== Demographics ==
According to the 2011 Census of India, Dakshin Bagdogra had a total population of 2,647 of which 1,301 (49%) were males and 1,346 (51%) were females. There were 317 persons in the age range of 0 to 6 years. The total number of literate people in Dakshin Bagdogra was 1,823 (68.87% of the population over 6 years).

== Infrastructure ==
According to the District Census Handbook 2011, Darjeeling, Dakshin Bagdogra covered an area of 1.4609 km^{2}. Among the civic amenities, it had 1 km road with open drains, the protected water supply involved tap water from uncovered well, tubewell/ borehole, it had 287 domestic electric connections. Among the medical facilities, it had 1 medicine shop. Among the educational facilities it had were 1 primary school, the nearest middle school, secondary school, senior secondary school, general degree college at Bagdogra 2–5 km away.
