= Naxal (disambiguation) =

Naxals or Naxalites are members of any of the communist guerrilla groups in India.

Naxal or Naxalites may also refer to:

== Media ==
- The Naxalites, a 1980 Bollywood film
- Naxal (film), a 2015 Tollywood film
- "Naxalite", a 1997 single by Asian Dub Foundation from the album Rafi's Revenge

== Other uses ==
- Naxalbari, village in the northern part of West Bengal, India where the communist movement originated
  - Naxalbari (community development block), containing the village
  - Naxalbari railway station
  - Naxalbari uprising (1967), which started the movement
- Naxalbari (TV series), an Indian web series
- Urban Naxal, derogatory term for leftist activists in India, coined by filmmaker Vivek Agnihotri
  - Urban Naxals: The Making of Buddha in a Traffic Jam, a 2018 book by Agnihotri, the origin of the term
