= Inaruwa–Kakarvitta Railway Project =

Railway project in Nepal

Inaruwa–Kakarvitta Rail Line

Overview
- Status: Underconstruction
- Owner: Government of Nepal
- Locale: Province No. 1
- Termini: Inaruwa Municipality; Kakarvitta
- Stations: 10
- Website: http://www.dorw.gov.np/

Service
- System: Standard gauge
- Services: Single track
- Operator(s): Department of Railway

Technical
- Line length: 126.763 km (78.767 mi)
- Track length: 126.763 km (78.767 mi)

Inaruwa - Kakarvitta Railway Project is an ongoing railway project in Nepal which is the eastern section of Mechi-Mahakali (East-West Railway) Electrified Railway Project. The DPR work which was started in 2015 is already completed. The length of the railway line is estimated. 126.763 kilometres (78.767 mi) and estimated cost of this project is calculated 90,028,286,240 Nepali Rupees in 2017. The railway line will run parallel 2 km south of Mahendra Highway. There will be 10 railway stations between Inaruwa to Kakarvitta.

== See also ==
- Nepal Railways
