= Kharibari (community development block) =

- Community development block
- Coordinates: 26.5719472°N 88.1474304°E
- Country: India
- State: West Bengal
- District: Darjeeling

Area
  - Total: 144.88 km^{2} (55.94 sq mi)

Population (2011)
  - Total: 109,251
  - Density: 754.08/km^{2} (1,953.1/sq mi)
- Time zone: UTC+5:30 (IST)
- Lok Sabha constituency: Darjeeling
- Vidhan Sabha constituency: Phansidewa
- Website: darjeeling.gov.in

Kharibari is a community development block (CD block) that forms an administrative division in the Siliguri subdivision of the Darjeeling district in the Indian state of West Bengal.

== Geography ==
Kharibari is located at 26°34′19″N 88°08′51″E.

Kharibari CD block is a part of the Western Dooars, a physiographic region spread over the foothills of the Himalayas. It is a plain land gently sloping from north to south, with an elevation varying from 80 m to 300 m. The Mechi forms the international boundary with Nepal on the western side.

Kharibari CD block is bounded by the Naxalbari CD block on the north, Phansidewa CD block on the east, Thakurganj CD block in Kishanganj district of Bihar on the south and Jhapa District in Province No. 1 of Nepal on the west.

The Kharibari CD block has an area of 144.88 km^{2}. It has 1 panchayat samity, 4 gram panchayats, 79 gram sansads (village councils), 76 mouzas and 73 inhabited villages. Kharibari police station serves this block Headquarters of this CD block is at Kharibari.

Gram panchayats in Kharibari CD block are: Binnabari, Buraganj, Kharibari-Panishali and Raniganj-Panishali.

== Demographics ==
=== Population ===
According to the 2011 Census of India, the Kharibari CD block had a total population of 109,251, of which 97,399 were rural and 11,852 were urban. There were 55,671 (51%) males and 53,580 (49%) females. There were 14,931 persons in the age range of 0 to 6 years. The Scheduled Castes numbered 58,570 (53.61%) and the Scheduled Tribes numbered 21,262 (19.46%).

Census towns in the Kharibari CD block are (2011 census figures in brackets): Shyamdhan (5,192) and Kharibari (6,660).

Large villages (with 4,000+ population) in the Kharibari CD block are (2011 census figures in brackets): Uttar Ramdhan (6,892), Gandagal (4,363) and Pataram (4,141).

Other villages in the Kharibari CD block include (2011 census figures in brackets): Buraganja (616).

=== Literacy ===
According to the 2011 census the total number of literate persons in the Kharibari CD block was 63,540 (67.37% of the population over 6 years) out of which males numbered 36,565 (76.00% of the male population over 6 years) and females numbered 26,975 (58.37% of the female population over 6 years). The gender disparity (the difference between female and male literacy rates) was 17.63%.

See also – List of West Bengal districts ranked by literacy rate

Literacy in CD blocks of
Darjeeling district (2011)
Darjeeling Sadar subdivision
Darjeeling Pulbazar – 80.78%
Rangli Rangliot – 80.50%
Jorebunglow Sukhiapokhri – 82.54%
Kalimpong subdivision
Kalimpong I – 81.43%
Kalimpong II – 79.68%
Gorubathan – 76.88%
Kurseong subdivision
Kurseong – 81.15%
Mirik subdivision
Mirik – 80.84%
Siliguri subdivision
Matigara – 74.78%
Naxalbari – 75.47%
Phansidewa – 64.46%
Kharibari – 67.37%
2011 Census: CD Block Wise

Primary Census Abstract Data

=== Language and religion ===
Religion in Kharibari CD block (2011)
Hinduism	91.01%
Islam	4.59%
Christianity	3.70%
Other or not stated	0.70%

In the 2011 census, Hindus numbered 99,430 and formed 91.01% of the population in the Kharibari CD block. Muslims numbered 5,012 and formed 4.59% of the population. Christians numbered 4,047 and formed 3.70% of the population. Buddhists numbered 391 and formed 0.36% of the population. Others numbered 371 and formed 0.34% of the population.

Languages of Kharibari CD block (2011)
1. Bengali (36.7%)
2. Rajbongshi (26.1%)
3. Hindi (8.05%)
4. Santali (7.44%)
5. Sadri (7.34%)
6. Nepali (4.35%)
7. Kurukh (3.70%)
8. 'Other' Bengali (1.85%)
9. Bhojpuri (1.42%)
10. Others (3.12%)

At the time of the 2011 census, 36.67% of the population spoke Bengali, 26.06% Rajbongshi, 8.05% Hindi, 7.44% Santali, 7.34% Sadri, 4.35% Nepali, 3.70% Kurukh and 1.42% Bhojpuri as their first language. 1.85% were recorded as speaking 'Others' under Bengali.

== Rural Poverty ==
According to the Rural Household Survey in 2005, 24.40% of the total number of families were BPL families in the Darjeeling district. According to a World Bank report, as of 2012, 4-9% of the population in Darjeeling, North 24 Parganas and South 24 Parganas districts were below poverty level, the lowest among the districts of West Bengal, which had an average 20% of the population below poverty line.

== Economy ==
=== Livelihood ===
Livelihood
in Kharibari CD block
1. Cultivators (16.3%)
2. Agricultural labourers (25.6%)
3. Household industries (3.72%)
4. Other Workers (54.5%)

In the Kharibari CD block in 2011, among the class of total workers, cultivators numbered 6,978 and formed 16.29%, agricultural labourers numbered 10,947 and formed 25.56%, household industry workers numbered 1,592 and formed 3.72% and other workers numbered 23.308 and formed 54.96%. Total workers numbered 42,825 and formed 39.20% of the total population, and non-workers numbered 66,426 and formed 60.80% of the population.

Note: In the census records a person is considered a cultivator, if the person is engaged in cultivation/ supervision of land owned by self/government/institution. When a person who works on another person's land for wages in cash or kind or share, is regarded as an agricultural labourer. Household industry is defined as an industry conducted by one or more members of the family within the household or village, and one that does not qualify for registration as a factory under the Factories Act. Other workers are persons engaged in some economic activity other than cultivators, agricultural labourers and household workers. It includes factory, mining, plantation, transport and office workers, those engaged in business and commerce, teachers, entertainment artistes and so on.

=== Infrastructure ===
There are 73 inhabited villages in the Kharibari CD block, as per the District Census Handbook, Darjiling, 2011. 100% villages have power supply. 100% villages have drinking water supply. 13 villages (17.81%) have post offices. 100% villages have telephones (including landlines, public call offices and mobile phones). 43 villages (58.90%) have pucca (paved) approach roads and 25 villages (34.25%) have transport communication (includes bus service, rail facility and navigable waterways). 1 village (1.37%) has an agricultural credit society and 2 villages (2.74%) have banks.

=== Agriculture ===
In 2012-13, there were 10 fertiliser depots, 10 seed stores and 22 fair price shops in Kharibari CD block.

In 2013–14, Kharibari CD block produced 15,768 tonnes of Aman paddy, the main winter crop, from 7,311 hectares, 1,320 tonnes of Aus paddy (summer crop) from 978 hectares, 2,340 tonnes of Boro paddy (spring crop) from 1,017 hectares, 771 tonnes of wheat from 871 hectares, 214 tonnes of maize from 93 hectares, 17,722 tonnes of jute from 1,218 hectares, 24,197 tonnes of potatoes from 801 hectares and 523 tonnes of sugar cane from 5 hectares. It also produced pulses and oilseeds.

=== Tea gardens ===
Darjeeling tea “received the iconic status due to its significant aroma, taste and colour… the first Indian product to be marked with the Geographical Indication (GI) tag in 2003… As per the definition, “Darjeeling Tea” can only refer to tea that has been cultivated, grown, produced, manufactured and processed in tea gardens in few specific hilly areas of the district.” Apart from the hill areas, tea is also grown in the plain areas of the terai and dooars, but such gardens are not covered under the GI tag.

As of 2009-10, there were 87 tea gardens covered under the GI tag, employing 51,091 persons. Total land under cultivation was 17,828.38 hectares and total production was 7.36 million kg. A much larger population is indirectly dependent on the tea industry in the district. The average annual production including those from the plain areas, exceeds 10 million kg.

As of 2013, Darjeeling subdivision had 46 tea estates, Kalimpong subdivision had 29 tea estates and Kurseong subdivision had 6 tea gardens. This added up to 81 tea estates in the hill areas. Bannackburn Tea Estate and Lingia Tea Estate in Darjeeling were the first to come up in 1835. Siliguri subdivision in the terai region had 45 tea estates.

=== Banking ===
In 2012-13, Kharibari CD block had offices of 2 commercial banks and 2 gramin banks.

== Transport ==
Kharibari CD block has 2 originating/ terminating bus routes. The nearest Batasi railway station and adhikari railway station is 17 km from the block headquarters.

State Highway 12 passes through Kharibari CD block.

== Education ==
In 2012-13, Kharibari CD block had 100 primary schools with 12,002 students, 5 middle schools with 1,491 students, 5 high schools with 2,509 students and 6 higher secondary schools with 10,041 students. Kharibari CD block had 254 institutions for special and non-formal education with 11,056 students

See also – Education in India

According to the 2011 census, in Kharibari CD block, among the 73 inhabited villages, 12 villages did not have a school, 21 villages had two or more primary schools, 12 villages had at least 1 primary and 1 middle school and 7 villages had at least 1 middle and 1 secondary school.

== Healthcare ==
In 2013, Kharibari CD block had 1 rural hospital, 2 primary health centres and 1 private nursing home with total 40 beds and 14 doctors (excluding private bodies). It had 11 family welfare subcentres. 7,044 patients were treated indoor and 95,802 patients were treated outdoor in the hospitals, health centres and subcentres of the CD block.

Kharibari Rural Hospital, with 34 beds at Kharibari, is the major government medical facility in the Darjeeling Kharibari block. There are primary health centres at Rangali (with 6 beds) and Batasi (with 10 beds).
