= Panitanki =

- Neighbourhood
- Location within West Bengal Location within India
- Coordinates: 26.64°N 88.17°E
- Country: India
- State: West Bengal
- District: Darjeeling
- Subdivision: Siliguri
- Village: Batasi

Population
  - Total: 13,688
- Time zone: UTC+5:30 (IST)
- PIN: 734427
- Telephone code: +91-05522
- Vehicle registration: WB

Panitanki is a town in Darjeeling district of West Bengal, India. It is located on the India-Nepal border; a border crossing to Kakarbhitta in Nepal is located here.

Places in the south-western portion of Siliguri subdivision in Darjeeling district
CT: census town, R: rural/ urban centre, F: facilities
Owing to space constraints in the small map, the actual locations in a larger map may vary slightly

Panitanki is around 84 km from the district headquarters, Darjeeling. The nearest railway station to Panitanki is Batasi railway station, which is around 3 km away and is now well connected with the Indian Railway Network.

== Area overview ==
The map alongside shows the Siliguri subdivision of Darjeeling district. This area is spread across the foothills of the Himalayas and is a plain land gently sloping from north to south. While the northern part is mentioned as the Terai region, the larger southern portion forms the western part of the Dooars region. While 55.11% per cent of the population resides in the rural areas, 44.89% resides in the urban areas. On the western side the Mechi River forms a long border with Nepal. On the eastern side the Mahananda River forms a short border with Bangladesh.

Note: The map alongside presents some of the notable locations in the subdivision. All places marked in the map are linked in the larger full screen map.
