= Kharibari =

- Census Town
- Location in West Bengal, India Kharibari (India)
- Coordinates: 26.56193°N 88.18943°E
- Country: India
- State: West Bengal
- District: Drjeeling

Population (2011)
  - Total: 6,660
- Time zone: UTC+5:30 (IST)
- PIN: 734427
- Telephone/STD code: 0353
- Lok Sabha constituency: Darjeeling
- Vidhan Sabha constituency: Phansidewa
- Website: darjeeling.gov.in

Kharibari is a census town in the Kharibari CD block in the Siliguri subdivision of the Darjeeling district in the state of West Bengal, India.

== Geography ==
Places in the south-western portion of Siliguri subdivision in Darjeeling district
CT: census town, R: rural/ urban centre, F: facilities
Owing to space constraints in the small map, the actual locations in a larger map may vary slightly

=== Location ===
Kharibari is located at 26.56193°N 88.18943°E.

=== Area overview ===
The map alongside shows the Siliguri subdivision of Darjeeling district. This area is spread across the foothills of the Himalayas and is a plain land gently sloping from north to south. While the northern part is mentioned as the Terai region, the larger southern portion forms the western part of the Dooars region. While 55.11% per cent of the population resides in the rural areas, 44.89% resides in the urban areas. On the western side the Mechi River forms a long border with Nepal. On the eastern side the Mahananda River forms a short border with Bangladesh.

Note: The map alongside presents some of the notable locations in the subdivision. All places marked in the map are linked in the larger full screen map.

== Demographics ==
According to the 2011 Census of India, Kharibari had a total population of 6,660 of which 3,389 (51%) were males and 3,271 (49%) were females. There were 811 persons in the age range of 0 to 6 years. The total number of literate people in Kharibari was 4,630 (69.52% of the population over 6 years).

== Civic Administration ==
=== Police station ===
Kharibari police station has jurisdiction over the Kharibari CD block.

=== CD block HQ ===
The headquarters of the Kharibari CD block is at Kharibari.

== Education ==
Kharibari High School is a Bengali-medium coeducational institution established in 1945. It has facilities for teaching from class VI to XII.
