= East-West Railway =

Planned railway line in Nepal

East-West Railway Line
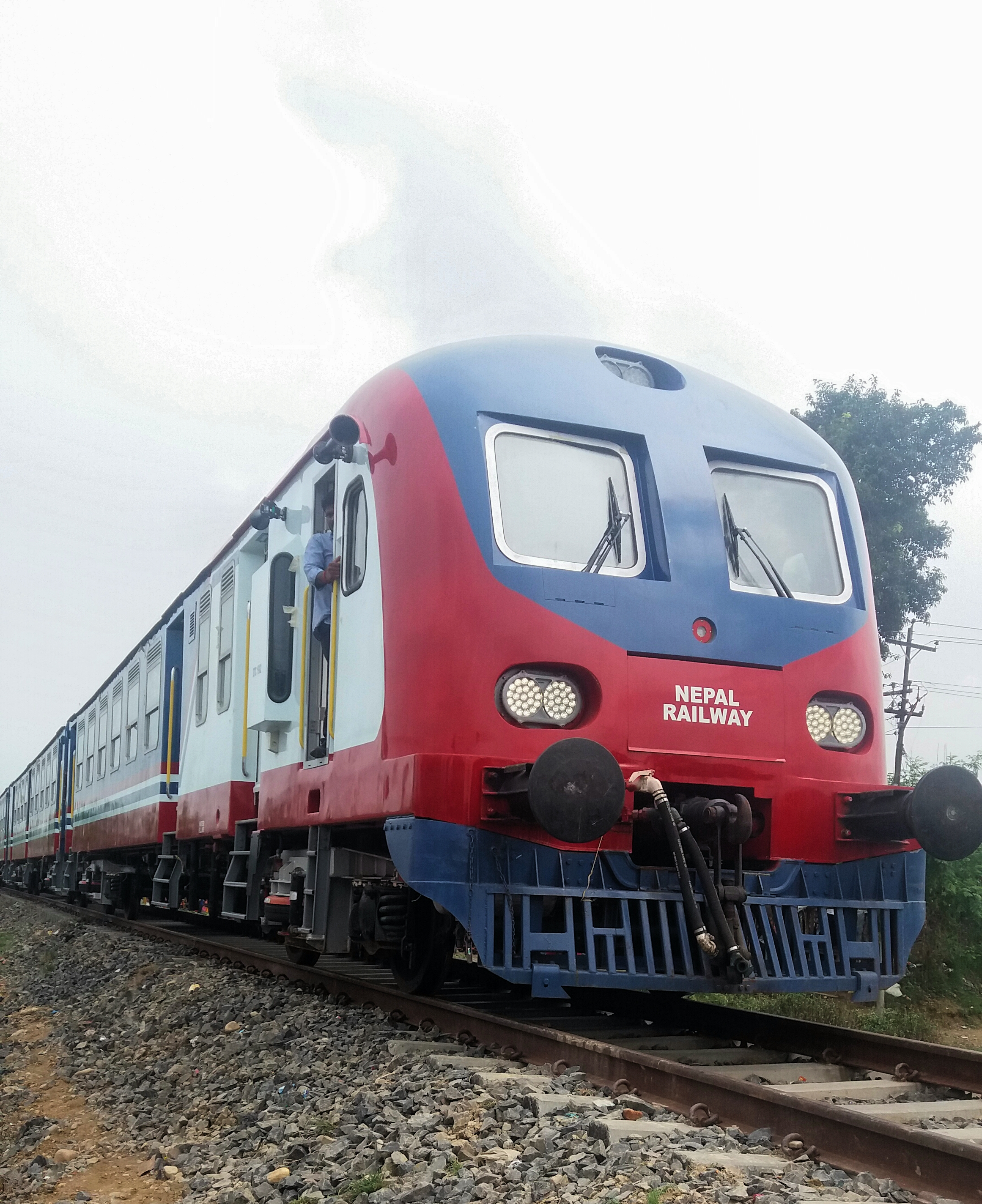
- An Engine of Nepal Railway

Overview
- Other name: Mechi-Mahakali Railway
- Native name: पुर्व-पश्चिम रेल्वे
- Status: Under-study
- Owner: Office Of The Investment Board; The Railway Department, Ministry Of Physical Infrastructure and Transport
- Locale: Terai from East to West
- Termini: Kakarbhitta, Mechi; Gadda Chauki border near Bhimdatta, Mahakali
- Website: www.dorw.gov.np

Service
- Type: Government sector
- Operator(s): Ajay Kumar Mull (Director General)

History
- Commenced: 2008

Technical
- Line length: 945.44 km (587 mi)
- Track length: 1,376 km (855 mi) to 4,000 km (2,485 mi)
- Track gauge: Standard gauge
- Route availability: Not available
- Conduction system: Electrified

The East-West Railway Line (Nepali: पुर्व-पश्चिम रेल्वे) or the Mechi-Mahakali Railway is an upcoming Trans-Asian Railway project in Nepal. The railway will be the longest in Nepal, stretching 945.244 km (587 mi) expanding from the Eastern Indo-Nepal border of Kakarbhitta to the Western Indo-Nepal border of Kanchanpur. Subsidiary lines will be added expanding the total project to 1,376 km (855 mi).

== History ==
The government developed the concept of the East-West Railway in 2007, forming the Department of Railways in 2011. The project started in 2008, but due to various economic, environmental and coordination challenges it was delayed until March 2020.

== Features ==
The network is expected to grow to 4,000 km within 20 years. This railway line is important for Nepal because it has long been dependent on India for its connection with the world through the Port of Kolkata and Vizag Port.

Total bridges: 334
Longest Bridge: 1171 m over Koshi River
Total tunnels: 10 (26.7 km)
Longest Tunnel: 17.742 km

== Controversies ==
Lack of coordination of inter-governmental bodies and conflicts between the locals and the construction company for land acquisition and deforestation stimulated controversy. The proposed route passes through Chitwan National Park, a World Heritage site. The route was widely criticized and the proposal was rejected by UNESCO. It also was criticized for threatening rare wildlife.

== Progress ==
More than Rs2 billion was spent for land acquisition and research and development, which will cost some Rs8 billion. The total cost is estimated to reach $3 billion. The initial track-bed has been laid across the 70 km Bardibas-Nijgadh section. The senior divisional engineer at the Department of Railways, Aman Chitrakar informed that the tracks will be laid after the construction of the track-bed from Kakadbhitta, Jhapa to Gaddachauki, Kanchanpur. A total of Rs 11.22 billion has been spent. The Government of Nepal is allocating Rs 4 billion annually for the expansion of the railway.

Under the Bardibas-Simra Railway Project, of the 108-kilometre section, track bedding work on the 70-kilometre section (Bardibas to Nijgadh) is almost completed. About 50 km of track bedding is already finished. The construction of bridges and installation of culvert along the section is underway.

== Section ==
The railway project is being constructed in nine sections as below:

1. Inaruwa–Kakarvitta Railway Project
2. Inaruwa–Bardibas Railway Project
3. Bardibas–Simra Railway Project
4. Simra–Tamasariya Railway Project
5. Tamasiya–Butwal Railway Project
6. Butwal–Lamahi Railway Project
7. Lamahi–Kohalpur Railway Project
8. Kohalpur–Sukkhad Railway Project
9. Sukhad–Gaddachowki Railway Project
