= Naxalbari =

Village in West Bengal, India

- Village
- Location of Naxalbari in West Bengal Location of Naxalbari in India
- Coordinates: 26.68315°N 88.19961°E
- Country: India
- State: West Bengal
- District: Darjeeling

Government
  - Body: Naxalbari Gram Panchayat
- Elevation: 152 m (499 ft)

Population (2011)
  - Total: 1,618

Languages
  - Official: Bengali, English
- Time zone: UTC+5:30 (IST)
- PIN: 734429
- Telephone code: 0353
- Lok Sabha constituency: Darjeeling
- Vidhan Sabha constituency: Matigara-Naxalbari
- Website: Naxalbari City

Naxalbari (Bengali: Nôkśālbāṛi, IPA: [nɔkʃalbaɽi]; also spelled Naksalbari) is a village in the Naxalbari Community Development Block in the Siliguri subdivision of Darjeeling district, in the Indian state of West Bengal. Located in the Terai region near the border with Nepal, it is known as the site of a 1967 peasant uprising that inspired the Naxalite movement in India. The surrounding area is predominantly agricultural, with tea estates, forests and small villages.

== History ==
Naxalbari became famous for being the site of a left-wing poor peasants uprising in 1967, which began with the "land to tiller" slogan, an uprising continuing to this day (see Naxalite).

The Naxalbari uprising was triggered on 25 May 1967 at Bengai Jote village in Naxalbari when the police opened fire on a group of villagers who were demanding their right to the crops at a particular piece of land. The firing killed nine adults and two children, whose identities were not officially recorded.

The CPI (ML) has erected busts of Lenin, Stalin, Mao and Charu Majumder at the site of the 1967 police firing, adjacent to Bengai Jote Primary School. A memorial column lists the names of those killed in the incident, including Dhaneswari Devi, Simaswari Mullick, Nayaneswari Mullick, Surubala Burman, Sonamati Singh, Fulmati Devi, Samsari Saibani, Gaudrau Saibani, Kharsingh Mullick and two children.

== Geography ==
Places in the south-western portion of Siliguri subdivision in Darjeeling district
CT: census town, R: rural/ urban centre, F: facilities
Owing to space constraints in the small map, the actual locations in a larger map may vary slightly

=== Location ===
Naxalbari is located at 26.68315°N 88.19961°E. It has an average elevation of 152 metres (501 feet).

The stretch of land, where Naxalbari is situated, lies on the Terai region at the base of the Himalayas. To the west of Naxalbari, across the border river Mechi lies Nepal. The entire stretch of the land surrounding Naxalbari is covered by farmlands, tea estates and forests and small villages consisting of an area of 182.02 km^{2}. The Naxalbari block has six Gram Panchayats (village councils), viz. Gossainpur, Lower Bagdogra, Upper Bagdogra, Hatighisha, Naxalbari and Moniram, from north to south. The population of the Naxalbari block was 144,915 in the year 2001.

=== Area overview ===
The map alongside shows the Siliguri subdivision of the Darjeeling district. This area is spread across the foothills of the Himalayas and is a plain land gently sloping from north to south. While the northern part is mentioned as the Terai region, the larger southern portion forms the western part of the Dooars region. While 55.11% per cent of the population resides in rural areas, 44.89% resides in urban areas. On the western side, the Mechi River forms a long border with Nepal. On the eastern side the Mahananda River forms a short border with Bangladesh.

Note: The map alongside presents some of the notable locations in the subdivision. All places marked in the map are linked in the larger full-screen map.

== Civic administration ==
=== Police station ===
Naxalbari police station has jurisdiction over the Naxalbari CD block.

=== CD block HQ ===
The headquarters of the Naxalbari CD block is at Naxalbari.

== Demographics ==
According to the 2011 Census of India, Naksalbari had a total population of 1,618 of which 811 (50%) were males and 807 (50%) were females. There were 138 persons in the age range of 0 to 6 years. The total number of literate people in Naksalbari was 1,289 (79.67% of the population over 6 years).

== Transport ==
Naxalbari has a railway station on the Katihar–Siliguri line. Daily trains run from New Jalpaiguri via Siliguri Town, Siliguri Junction, Matigara and Bagdogra. There are four trains running from New Jalpaiguri; New Jalpaiguri-Katihar Passenger, New Jalpaiguri-Aluabari-New Jalpaiguri DEMU Ring Rail, New Jalpaiguri-Balurghat DEMU and New Jalpaiguri-Radhikapur DEMU.

There is also a bus service from Siliguri Court More to Naxalbari.

Naxalbari's Panitanki neighbourhood is on Nepal's eastern border with India at Jhapa District, Province No. 1. There is a border crossing to the Kakarbhitta neighbourhood of Mechinagar municipality with a checkpoint for customs and crossing by third-country nationals while citizens of Nepal and India cross without restriction.

== Education ==
Naxalbari has two major government high schools, one for males and one for females, and one college. There are many public and private primary schools.

- Nand Prasad High School – A government boys high school, which runs from class 5th to 12th grade. It was founded in 1943.
- Nand Prasad Girls High School – A government girls high school, which runs classes from 5th grade to 12th grade. It was founded in 1973.
- Naxalbari Nepali High School – A government co-ed high school, from 5th Grade to 12th Grade. Founded in 1985, it was recognised by the Govt. of W. B. in 2000.
- Naxalbari College – A government college. It was established in 2008.
- Shreema Shishu Udyan School – A private primary school for boys and girls, which runs classes from 1st grade to 5th grade. It was founded in 1979.
- Sabuj Sathi Nursery School – A private primary school for boys and girls, which runs classes from pre-nursery to 4th grade. It was founded in 1984. Mrs. Laxmi Ghosh established Shreema Shishu Udyan and Sabuj Sathi Nursery School.
- Sarada Vidya Mandir – A private primary school for boys and girls, which runs classes from pre-nursery to 8th grade (increase every year up to 10th). It was established in 1998.
- Sister Margaret English Public School – This school only teaches up to the primary level.
- Raja Rammohan Navodaya Vidyalaya – A private Bengali medium primary level school.
- Seventh Day Adventist English School- A minority Christian institution founded in 1960, with classes from Nursery to 10th, following the ICSE pattern and a co-educational school with day and boarding facilities for the students. The school plans to upgrade to classes 11th and 12th in the coming years and offer all three streams, Commerce, Science and Humanities.

== See also ==
- Naxal (disambiguation)
