= Naxalbari (community development block) =

- Community development block
- Coordinates: 26.68°N 88.22°E
- Country: India
- State: West Bengal
- District: Darjeeling

Area
  - Total: 181.88 km^{2} (70.22 sq mi)

Population (2011)
  - Total: 165,523
  - Density: 910.07/km^{2} (2,357.1/sq mi)
- Time zone: UTC+5:30 (IST)
- Lok Sabha constituency: Darjeeling
- Vidhan Sabha constituency: Matigara-Naxalbari
- Website: darjeeling.gov.in

Naxalbari is a community development block (CD block) that forms an administrative division in the Siliguri subdivision of the Darjeeling district in the Indian state of West Bengal.

== Geography ==
Naxalbari is located at 26.68°N 88.22°E. It has an average elevation of 152 metres (501 feet).

Naxalbari CD block is a part of the Western Dooars, a physiographic region spread over the foothills of the Himalayas. It is a plain land gently sloping from north to south, with an elevation varying from 80 m to 300 m. The Mechi forms the international boundary with Nepal on the western side. The river is flood-prone and there are embankments along the river.

Naxalbari CD block is bounded by the Mirik and Kurseong CD blocks on the north, Matigara CD block on the east, Phansidewa and Kharibari CD blocks on the south and Ilam district in Province No. 1 of Nepal on the west.

The Naxalbari CD block has an area of 181.88 km^{2}. It has 1 panchayat samity, 6 gram panchayats, 121 gram sansads (village councils), 98 mouzas, 78 inhabited villages and 6 census towns. Naxalbari police station serves this block Headquarters of this CD block is at Naxalbari.

Gram panchayats in Naxalbari CD block are: Naxalbari, Gossaipur, Hatighisa, Maniram, Uttar Bagdogra and Dakshin Bagdogra.

== Demographics ==
=== Population ===
According to the 2011 Census of India, the Naxalbari CD block had a total population of 165,523, of which 97,713 were rural and 67,806 were urban. There were 85,054 (51%) males and 80,469 (49%) females. There were 18,897 persons in the age range of 0 to 6 years. The Scheduled Castes numbered 44,328 (26.78%) and the Scheduled Tribes numbered 32,388 (19.57%).

Census towns in the Naxalbari CD block are (2011 census figures in brackets): Uttar Bagdogra (25,044), Dakshin Bagdogra (2,647), Dumriguri (13,416), Geni (8,747), Bhimram (11,058) and Lalman (6,894).

Large villages (with 4,000+ population) in the Naxalbari CD block are (2011 census figures in brackets):Kamala (4,908) and Ranidanga (4,655).

Other villages in the Naxalbari CD block include (2011 census figures in brackets): Rangapani (3,619), Dhakna (3,537) and Nakshalbari (1,618).

=== Literacy ===
According to the 2011 census the total number of literate persons in the Naxalbari CD block was 110,663 (75.47% of the population over 6 years) out of which males numbered 62,270 (82.70% of the male population over 6 years) and females numbered 48,393 (67.84% of the female population over 6 years). The gender disparity (the difference between female and male literacy rates) was 14.86%.

See also – List of West Bengal districts ranked by literacy rate

Literacy in CD blocks of
Darjeeling district (2011)
Darjeeling Sadar subdivision
Darjeeling Pulbazar – 80.78%
Rangli Rangliot – 80.50%
Jorebunglow Sukhiapokhri – 82.54%
Kalimpong subdivision
Kalimpong I – 81.43%
Kalimpong II – 79.68%
Gorubathan – 76.88%
Kurseong subdivision
Kurseong – 81.15%
Mirik subdivision
Mirik – 80.84%
Siliguri subdivision
Matigara – 74.78%
Naxalbari – 75.47%
Phansidewa – 64.46%
Kharibari – 67.37%
2011 Census: CD Block Wise

Primary Census Abstract Data

=== Language and religion ===
Religion in Naxalbari CD block (2011)
| Hinduism | 86.03% |
| Christianity | 6.57% |
| Islam | 5.69% |
| Buddhism | 1.31% |
| Other or not stated | 0.40% |

In the 2011 census, Hindus numbered 142,396 and formed 86.08% of the population in the Naxalbari CD block. Christians numbered 10,878 and formed 6.57% of the population. Muslims numbered 9,420 and formed 5.69% of the population. Buddhists numbered 2,164 and formed 1.31% of the population. Others numbered 665 and formed 0.40% of the population.

Languages of Naxalbari CD block (2011)
1. Bengali (32.6%)
2. Nepali (14.8%)
3. Sadri (13.3%)
4. Rajbongshi (12.5%)
5. Hindi (12.2%)
6. Kurukh (2.97%)
7. Bhojpuri (1.69%)
8. Boro (1.07%)
9. 'Other' Bengali (1.02%)
10. Santali (0.91%)
11. Others (6.95%)

At the time of the 2011 census, 32.64% of the population spoke Bengali, 14.79% Nepali, 13.27% Sadri, 12.47% Rajbongshi, 12.22% Hindi, 2.97% Kurukh, 1.69% Bhojpuri, 1.07% Boro and 0.91% Santali as their first language. 1.02% were recorded as speaking 'Others' under Bengali.

== Rural Poverty ==
According to the Rural Household Survey in 2005, 24.40% of the total number of families were BPL families in the Darjeeling district. According to a World Bank report, as of 2012, 4-9% of the population in Darjeeling, North 24 Parganas and South 24 Parganas districts were below poverty level, the lowest among the districts of West Bengal, which had an average 20% of the population below poverty line.

== Economy ==
=== Livelihood ===
Livelihood
in Naxalbari CD block
1. Cultivators (6.30%)
2. Agricultural labourers (7.18%)
3. Household industries (2.25%)
4. Other Workers (84.3%)

In the Naxalbari CD block in 2011, among the class of total workers, cultivators numbered 3,836 and formed 6.30%, agricultural labourers numbered 4,369 and formed 7.18%, household industry workers numbered 1,370 and formed 2.25% and other workers numbered 51,287 and formed 84.27%. Total workers numbered 60,862 and formed 36.77% of the total population, and non-workers numbered 104,661 and formed 63.23% of the population.

Note: In the census records a person is considered a cultivator, if the person is engaged in cultivation/ supervision of land owned by self/government/institution. When a person who works on another person's land for wages in cash or kind or share, is regarded as an agricultural labourer. Household industry is defined as an industry conducted by one or more members of the family within the household or village, and one that does not qualify for registration as a factory under the Factories Act. Other workers are persons engaged in some economic activity other than cultivators, agricultural labourers and household workers. It includes factory, mining, plantation, transport and office workers, those engaged in business and commerce, teachers, entertainment artistes and so on.

=== Infrastructure ===
There are 78 inhabited villages in the Naxalbari CD block, as per the District Census Handbook, Darjiling, 2011. 100% villages have power supply. 77 villages (98.72%) have drinking water supply. 10 villages (12.82%) have post offices. 70 villages (89.74%) have telephones (including landlines, public call offices and mobile phones). 53 villages (67.95%) have pucca (paved) approach roads and 21 villages (26.92%) have transport communication (includes bus service, rail facility and navigable waterways). 4 villages (5.13%) have banks.

=== Agriculture ===
In 2012–13, there were 22 fair price shops in Naxalbari CD block.

In 2013–14, Naxalbari CD block produced 6,624 tonnes of Aman paddy, the main winter crop, from 3,544 hectares, 1,410 tonnes of Aus paddy (summer crop) from 715 hectares, 438 tonnes of Boro paddy (spring crop) from 230 hectares, 293 tonnes of wheat from 158 hectares, 308 tonnes of maize from 134 hectares, 3,899 tonnes of jute from 331 hectares and 6,353 tonnes of potatoes from 291 hectares. It also produced pulses and oilseeds.

=== Tea gardens ===
Darjeeling tea “received the iconic status due to its significant aroma, taste and colour… the first Indian product to be marked with the Geographical Indication (GI) tag in 2003… As per the definition, “Darjeeling Tea” can only refer to tea that has been cultivated, grown, produced, manufactured and processed in tea gardens in few specific hilly areas of the district.” Apart from the hill areas, tea is also grown in the plain areas of the terai and dooars, but such gardens are not covered under the GI tag.

As of 2009–10, there were 87 tea gardens covered under the GI tag, employing 51,091 persons. Total land under cultivation was 17,828.38 hectares and total production was 7.36 million kg. A much larger population is indirectly dependent on the tea industry in the district. The average annual production including those from the plain areas, exceeds 10 million kg.

As of 2013, Darjeeling subdivision had 46 tea estates, Kalimpong subdivision had 29 tea estates and Kurseong subdivision had 6 tea gardens. This added up to 81 tea estates in the hill areas. Bannackburn Tea Estate and Lingia Tea Estate in Darjeeling were the first to come up in 1835. Siliguri subdivision in the terai region had 45 tea estates.

=== Banking ===
In 2012–13, Naxalbari CD block had offices of 6 commercial banks and 2 gramin banks.

== Transport ==
Naxalbari CD block has 2 originating/ terminating bus routes. The nearest railway station is 2 km from the block headquarters.

State Highway 12 passes through Naxalbari CD block.

There are stations at Bagdogra, Hatighisa and Nakshalbari on the Katihar-Siliguri line.

Bagdogra Airport, an international airport, is located nearby.

== Education ==
In 2012–13, Naxalbari CD block had 124 primary schools with 12,061 students, 7 middle schools with 1,759 students, 6 high schools with 5,162 students and 9 higher secondary schools with 15,049 students. Naxalbari CD block had 2 general degree colleges with 3,281 students, 364 institutions for special and non-formal education with 13,353 students

See also – Education in India

According to the 2011 census, in Naxalbari CD block, among the 78 inhabited villages, 16 villages did not have a school, 18 villages had two or more primary schools, 12 villages had at least 1 primary and 1 middle school and 7 villages had at least 1 middle and 1 secondary school.

- Kalipada Ghosh Tarai Mahavidyalaya was established at Uttar Bagdogra in 1988.
- Nakshalbari College was established in 2008 at Naxalbari.

== Healthcare ==
In 2013, Naxalbari CD block had 1 rural hospital, 1 primary health centre and 3 private nursing homes with total 60 beds and 15 doctors (excluding private bodies). It had 15 family welfare subcentres. 9,487 patients were treated indoor and 169,724 patients were treated outdoor in the hospitals, health centres and subcentres of the CD block.

Naxalbari Rural Hospital, with 50 beds at Naxalbari, is the major government medical facility in the Naxalbari CD block. There is a primary health centre at Bagdogra (with 10 beds).
