= Naxalbari railway station =

Railway station in West Bengal, India

General information
- Location: Naxalbari, West Bengal; India
- Elevation: 156 metres (512 ft)
- System: Indian Railways station
- Owner: Indian Railways
- Operator: Northeast Frontier Railway
- Line: Katihar–Siliguri line
- Platforms: 2
- Tracks: 3

Construction
- Structure type: Standard (on-ground station)
- Parking: Yes
- Cycle facilities: No
- Accessible: Yes

Other information
- Status: Single Electric line
- Station code: NAK
- Zone(s): Northeast Frontier Railway
- Division(s): Katihar
Location
- Location within India Location within West Bengal

Naxalbari railway station is a railway station in Darjeeling district, West Bengal which lies on the Katihar–Siliguri line. Its code is NAK. It serves Naxalbari town which is just 5.7 km away from Panitanki, which is the border between India and Nepal. The station consists of a single platform. The platform is not well sheltered. It lacks many facilities including water and sanitation..

== Trains ==
Following trains are operated through this station-

- Alipurduar - Delhi Junction Mahananda Express
- Sealdah-Alipurduar Kanchan Kanya Express
- Siliguri - Radhikapur Express
- Siliguri Junction-Balurghat Express
- Siliguri Junction-Katihar Express (via Barsoi)
- Siliguri - Katihar Intercity Express (via Purnea)
- Siliguri–Katihar Passenger (unreserved)
- Radhikapur–Siliguri DEMU
- Siliguri Jn.–Malda Court DEMU
