= Phansidewa =

Phansidewa ফাঁসিদেওয়া
- Community development block
- Coordinates: 26.58°N 88.36°E
- Country: India
- State: West Bengal
- District: Darjeeling

Government
  - Type: Community development block

Area
  - Total: 312.15 km^{2} (120.52 sq mi)

Population (2011)
  - Total: 204,522
  - Density: 655.20/km^{2} (1,697.0/sq mi)
- Time zone: UTC+5:30 (IST)
- Lok Sabha constituency: Darjeeling
- Vidhan Sabha constituency: Phansidewa
- Siliguri Mahakuma Parishad constituency: Phansidewa-SMP 7,8,9
- Website: darjeeling.gov.in

Phansidewa is a community development block (CD block) that forms an administrative division in the Siliguri subdivision of the Darjeeling district in the Indian state of West Bengal.

== Public Representatives ==
Siliguri Mahakuma Parishad

SMP-7	Kumudini Ghosh Baraik
SMP-8	Ainul Haque
SMP-9	Roma Reshmi Ekka

Panchayat Samiti

Panchayat Samiti	Sabhapati	Saha-Sabhapati
Phansidewa	Rina Ekka	Chandra Mahan Roy

Gram Panchayat

Gram Panchayat	Pradhan	Upa Pradhan
Phansidewa Bansgaon Kismat	Anima Roy	Partha Biswas
Chathat Bansgaon	Pampa Singha	Hajira Khatun
Jalash Nizamtara	Sampa Das Mistri	Bhumika Singha
Bidhannagar 1	Jyoti Xalxo	Shankar Sarkar
Bidhannagar 2	Jharna Sarkar Mandal	Pramila Lakra
Hetmuri Singhijhora	Jagannath Roy	Bijaya Mangar
Ghoshpukur	John Ranjan Kindo	Sanchita Das Sarkar

== Officers and Officials ==
Banani Majumdar	Block Development Officer
	Joint BDO
Dr. S Islam	BMOH
	BLLRO

== Geography ==
Phansidewa is located at 26.58°N 88.36°E. It has an average elevation of 98 metres (322 ft).

Phansidewa CD block is a part of the Western Dooars, a physiographic region spread over the foothills of the Himalayas. It is a plain land gently sloping from north to south, with an elevation varying from 80 m to 300 m. The Mahananda forms the eastern boundary of Phansidewa CD block with Bangladesh and a portion of the block is part of the Mahananda Tract physiographic region.

Phansidewa CD block is bounded by the Naxalbari and Matigara CD blocks on the north, Rajganj CD block in Jalpaiguri district and Panchagarh Sadar Upazila in Panchagarh district of Bangladesh on the east, Chopra CD block in Uttar Dinajpur district and Puthia CD block in Kishanganj district of Bihar on the south and Kharibari CD block on the west.

The Phansidewa CD block has an area of 312.15 km^{2} (120.52 sq mi). It has three Siliguri Mahakuma Parishad / Zila Parishad seats (SMP-7, SMP-8, SMP-9 ) one panchayat samity, seven gram panchayats, 139 gram sansads (village councils), 113 mouzas and 103 inhabited villages. Phansidewa police station serves this block Headquarters of this CD block is at Phansidewa. As per map of Phansidewa CD block in the District Census Handbook, Phansidewa is shown in Bandar Gachh mouza.

Gram panchayats in Phansidewa CD block are: Bidhannagar I, Bidhannagar II, Chathat-Bansgaon, Ghoshpukur, Hetmuri, Jalas-Nijamtara and Phansidewa.

== Demographics ==
=== Population ===
According to the 2011 Census of India, the Phansidewa CD block had a total population of 204,522, all of which were rural. There were 103,79 (51%) males and 100,803 (49%) females. There were 28,345 persons in the age range of 0 to 6 years. The Scheduled Castes numbered 60,704 (29.68%) and the Scheduled Tribes numbered 62,595 (30.61%).

Large villages (with 4,000+ population) in the Phansidewa CD block are (2011 census figures in brackets): Pathar Hirhirar Chhat (4,039), Liusipukuri (5,185), Uttar Bansgaon Kismat (5,064), Madhya Bansgaon (9,132), Paschim Madati (13,523), Mandila Jhar (6,642), Bara Paikpara Arazi (6,899), Lahugaon (12,710), Budharugaon (6,841), Purba Madati (6,424) and Bansgaon (5,958).

Other villages in the Phansidewa CD block include (2011 census figures in brackets): Hetmuri (2,124) and Bandar Gachh (3,891).

=== Literacy ===
According to the 2011 census the total number of literate persons in the Phansidewa CD block was 113,572 (64.46% of the population over 6 years) out of which males numbered 64,890 (72.63% of the male population over 6 years) and females numbered 48,682 (56.06% of the female population over 6 years). The gender disparity (the difference between female and male literacy rates) was 16.57%.

See also – List of West Bengal districts ranked by literacy rate

Literacy in CD blocks of
Darjeeling district (2011)
Darjeeling Sadar subdivision
Darjeeling Pulbazar – 80.78%
Rangli Rangliot – 80.50%
Jorebunglow Sukhiapokhri – 82.54%
Kalimpong subdivision
Kalimpong I – 81.43%
Kalimpong II – 79.68%
Gorubathan – 76.88%
Kurseong subdivision
Kurseong – 81.15%
Mirik subdivision
Mirik – 80.84%
Siliguri subdivision
Matigara – 74.78%
Naxalbari – 75.47%
Phansidewa – 64.46%
Kharibari – 67.37%
2011 Census: CD Block Wise

Primary Census Abstract Data

=== Language and Religion ===
Religion of Phansidewa CD block (2011)
1. Hindu (59.7%)
2. Muslim (23.6%)
3. Christian (16.2%)
4. Others (0.57%)

In the 2011 census, Hinduism is the major religion of Phansidewa CD Block which is followed by 59.68% of the total population ,Islam is the second major religion of Phansidewa CD Block which is followed by 23.57% of the total population, Christianity is the third major religion of Phansidewa CD Block which is followed by 16.18% of the total population, Sikhs and Buddhists also have a smaller presence in this Block.

Languages of Phansidewa CD block (2011)
1. Bengali (44.0%)
2. Sadri (14.2%)
3. Kurukh (13.4%)
4. Rajbongshi (12.0%)
5. Hindi (4.69%)
6. Santali (3.56%)
7. Nepali (2.53%)
8. Mundari (1.41%)
9. Bhojpuri (1.04%)
10. Others (3.16%)

At the time of the 2011 census, 43.99% of the population spoke Bengali, 14.18% Sadri, 13.45% Kurukh, 11.99% Rajbongshi, 4.69% Hindi, 3.56% Santali, 2.53% Nepali, 1.41% Mundari and 1.04% Bhojpuri as their first language.

== Rural poverty ==
According to the Rural Household Survey in 2005, 24.40% of the total number of families were BPL families in the Darjeeling district. According to a World Bank report, as of 2012, 4-9% of the population in Darjeeling, North 24 Parganas and South 24 Parganas districts were below poverty level, the lowest among the districts of West Bengal, which had an average 20% of the population below poverty line.

== Economy ==
=== Livelihood ===
Livelihood
in Phansidewa CD block
1. Cultivators (11.5%)
2. Agricultural labourers (16.8%)
3. Household industries (2.05%)
4. Other Workers (69.7%)

In the Phansidewa CD block in 2011, among the class of total workers, cultivators numbered 8.792 and formed 11.48%, agricultural labourers numbered 12.865 and formed 16.80%, household industry workers numbered 1,571 formed 2.05% and other workers numbered 53,333 and formed 69.66%. Total workers numbered 76,561 and formed 37.43% of the total population, and non-workers numbered 127,961 and formed 62.57% of the population.

Note: In the census records a person is considered a cultivator, if the person is engaged in cultivation/ supervision of land owned by self/government/institution. When a person who works on another person's land for wages in cash or kind or share, is regarded as an agricultural labourer. Household industry is defined as an industry conducted by one or more members of the family within the household or village, and one that does not qualify for registration as a factory under the Factories Act. Other workers are persons engaged in some economic activity other than cultivators, agricultural labourers and household workers. It includes factory, mining, plantation, transport and office workers, those engaged in business and commerce, teachers, entertainment artistes and so on.

=== Infrastructure ===
There are 103 inhabited villages in the Phansidewa CD block, as per the District Census Handbook, Darjiling, 2011. 100% villages have power supply. 100% villages have drinking water supply. 26 villages (25.24%) have post offices. 97 villages (94.17%) have telephones (including landlines, public call offices and mobile phones). 83 villages (80.58%) have pucca (paved) approach roads and 39 villages (37.86%) have transport communication (includes bus service, rail facility and navigable waterways). 3 villages (2.91%) have agricultural credit societies and 15 villages (14.56%) have banks.

=== Agriculture ===
In 2012–2013, there were 12 fertiliser depots, 12 seed stores and 31 fair price shops in Phansidewa CD block.

In 2013–14, Phansidewa CD block produced 9,949 tonnes of Aman paddy, the main winter crop, from 1.257 hectares, 2,212 tonnes of Aus paddy (summer crop) from 1,759 hectares, 2,340 tonnes of Boro paddy (spring crop) from 1,017 hectares, 771 tonnes of wheat from 871 hectares, 214 tonnes of maize from 93 hectares, 17,722 tonnes of jute from 1,218 hectares, 24,197 tonnes of potatoes from 801 hectares and 523 tonnes of sugar cane from 5 hectares. It also produced pulses and oilseeds.

=== Tea gardens ===
Darjeeling tea “received the iconic status due to its significant aroma, taste and colour… the first Indian product to be marked with the Geographical Indication (GI) tag in 2003… As per the definition, “Darjeeling Tea” can only refer to tea that has been cultivated, grown, produced, manufactured and processed in tea gardens in few specific hilly areas of the district.” Apart from the hill areas, tea is also grown in the plain areas of the terai and dooars, but such gardens are not covered under the GI tag.

As of 2009–2010, there were 87 tea gardens covered under the GI tag, employing 51,091 persons. Total land under cultivation was 17,828.38 hectares and total production was 7.36 million kg. A much larger population is indirectly dependent on the tea industry in the district. The average annual production including those from the plain areas, exceeds 10 million kg.

As of 2013, Darjeeling subdivision had 46 tea estates, Kalimpong subdivision had 29 tea estates and Kurseong subdivision had 6 tea gardens. This added up to 81 tea estates in the hill areas. Bannackburn Tea Estate and Lingia Tea Estate in Darjeeling were the first to come up in 1835. Siliguri subdivision in the terai region had 45 tea estates.

=== Banking ===
In 2012–2013, Phansidewa CD block had offices of 5 commercial banks and 3 gramin banks.

== Transport ==
Phansidewa CD block is well connected with the other parts of the country by all modern modes of transport. This Block is very adjacent to the Major Railway Station, Bus Terminus and Airport, which enable the population of this Block to use necessary transportation to move to any part of the country .Daily thousands of heavy goods vehicles from various parts of the country move to the North-Eastern States. Of the seven Gram Panchayats under Phansidewa block, four Gram Panchayats viz., Bidhannagar-1, Bidhnnagar-2, Ghoshpukur and Hetmuri Singhijhora are located on both the sides of the National Highway 31 (N.H 31 ). It provides a natural advantage of better road transportation to the villagers of those 27 Gram Panchayats.

Among the others sources of transportation the block has three railway stations within its jurisdiction.New Jalpaiguri Junction railway station, the main railway station in North Bengal, is also very adjacent to the block. Tenzing Norgay Bus Terminus, the biggest bus 28 terminus in North Bengal, is just a few kilometres from the block. The nearest airport is Bagdogra Airport, which is also adjacent to the block, In fact certain portion of the Bagdogra Airport falls under the Turibhita Mouza of this Block.

== Education ==
In 2012–2013, Phansidewa CD block had 153 primary schools with 17,884 students, 5 middle schools with 2,350 students, 6 high schools with 2,354 students and 12 higher secondary schools with 20,987 students. Phansidewa CD block had 593 institutions for special and non-formal education with 31,356 students

See also – Education in India

According to the 2011 census, in Phansidewa CD block, among the 103 inhabited villages, 15 villages did not have a school, 42 villages had two or more primary schools, 27 villages had at least 1 primary and 1 middle school and 15 villages had at least 1 middle and 1 secondary school.

== Healthcare ==
In 2013, Phansidewa CD block had 1 rural hospital, 1 primary health centre and 2 private nursing homes with total 40 beds and 14 doctors (excluding private bodies). It had 22 family welfare subcentres. 3,264 patients were treated indoor and 96,850 patients were treated outdoor in the hospitals, health centres and subcentres of the CD block.

Phansidewa Rural Hospital at Phansidewa, with 30 beds, is the major government medical facility in the Phansidewa CD block. There is a primary health centre at Bidhannagar (with 10 beds).
