= Batasi railway station =

Railway station in West Bengal

General information
- Location: Batasi, West Bengal; India
- Coordinates: 26.6095°N 88.1742°E
- Elevation: 167 metres (548 ft)
- System: Indian Railways station
- Owner: Indian Railways
- Operator: Northeast Frontier Railway
- Line: Katihar–Siliguri line
- Platforms: 2
- Tracks: 5

Construction
- Structure type: Standard (on ground station)
- Parking: yes
- Cycle facilities: yes

Other information
- Status: Single diesel line
- Station code: BTSI
- Zone(s): Northeast Frontier Railway
- Division(s): Katihar
Location
- Location within West Bengal Location within India

Batasi railway station is a small railway station in Darjeeling district, West Bengal which lies on the Katihar–Siliguri line. Its code is BTSI. It serves Batasi town which is just 3.2 km (2.0 mi) away from Panitanki, which is the border between India and Nepal. The station consists of a single platform. The platform is not well sheltered. It lacks many facilities including water and sanitation.
