= Kakarbhitta =

Kakarbhitta काँकडभिट्टा
- Neighbourhood
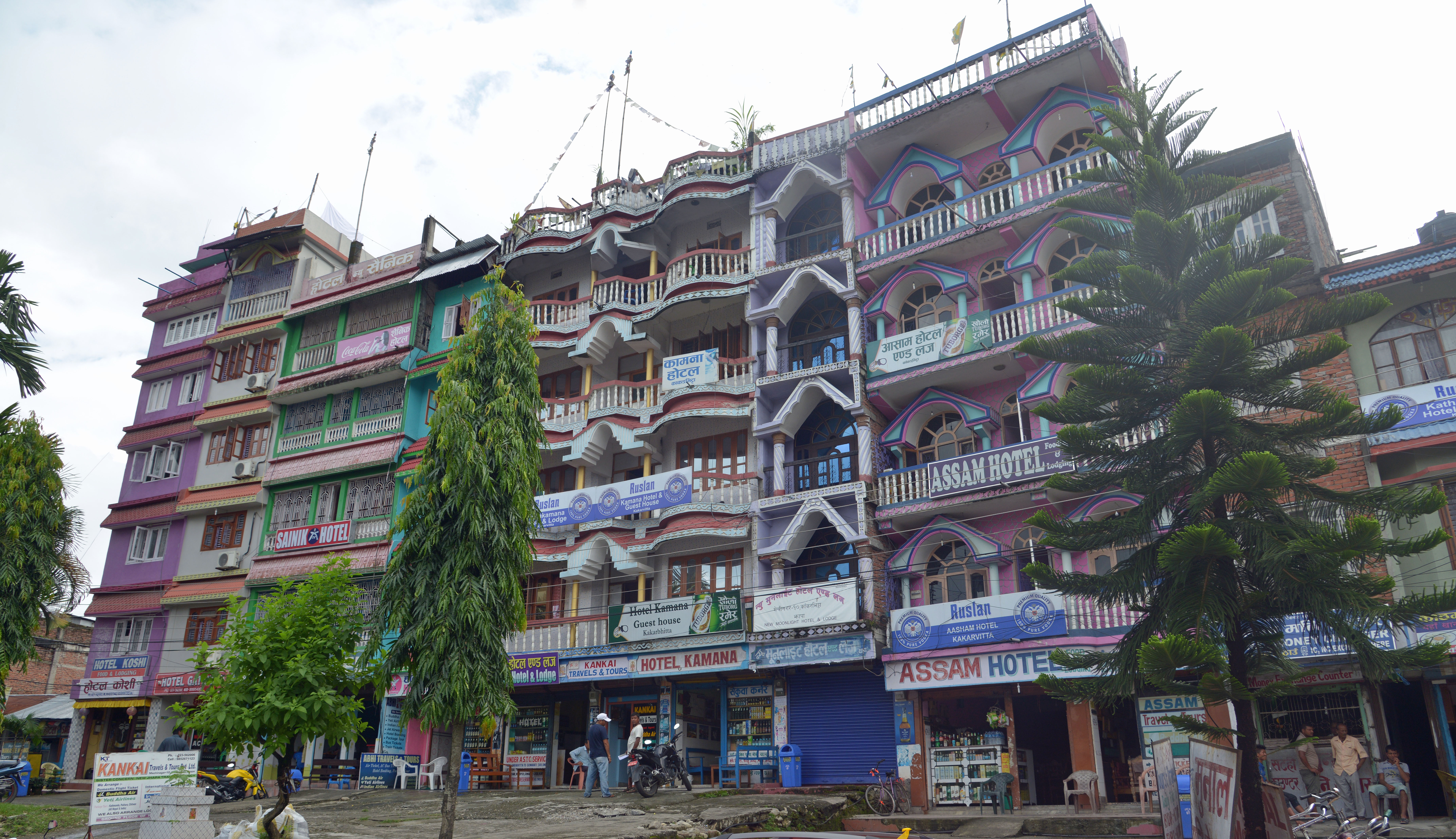
- Assam Hotel at Kakarbhitta

- Location in Nepal
- Coordinates: 26°38′48″N 88°09′17″E
- Country: Nepal
- Province: Koshi
- District: Jhapa
- Elevation: 142 m (466 ft)

Population (1991)
  - Total: 21,366
- Time zone: UTC+5:45 (Nepal Time)

Kakarbhitta (often written and pronounced Kakadbhitta or Kakarvitta) is a neighbourhood in Mechinagar Municipality in Jhapa District of Koshi Province, Southeastern Nepal.

== Demographics ==
At the time of the 1991 Nepal census, Mechinagar had a population of 21,366 people living in 4147 individual households.

== Transport ==
Kakarbhitta is the eastern terminus of Nepal's east-west Mahendra Highway at the country's eastern border with Darjeeling District, West Bengal state, India. The Panitanki neighborhood of Batasi is on the other side. There is a border checkpoint for customs and third-country nationals, though Indian and Nepalese nationals cross without restriction.

Cross-border traffic among Nepal, India and Bangladesh moves through Kakarbhitta.

Kakarbhitta is 21 kilometers from Bhadrapur airport (Nepal), 105 kilometers from Biratnagar airport (Nepal) and 21.5 kilometers from Bagdogra airport (India).
