= Batasi =

- Village
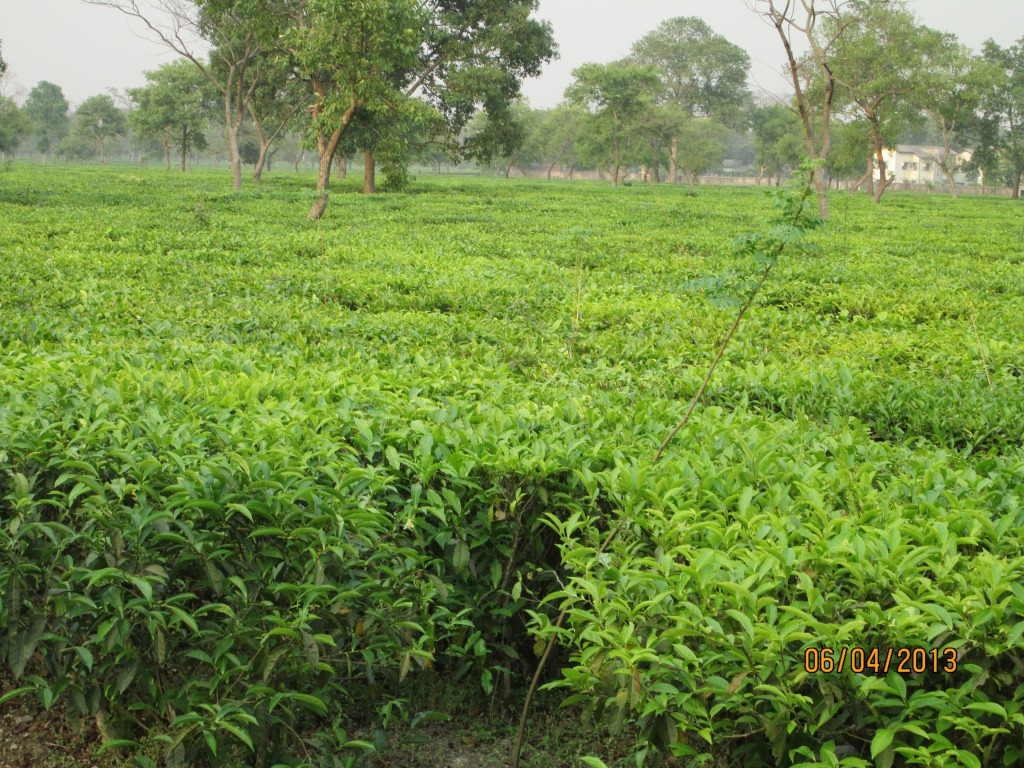
- Tea Estate at Batasi

- Location within West Bengal Location within India
- Coordinates: 26.5995°N 88.1804°E
- Country: India
- State: West Bengal
- District: Darjeeling
- Subdivision: Siliguri

Government
  - Type: Darjeeling
  - Body: Raniganjpanishali G.P

Area
  - Total: 9.7 km^{2} (3.7 sq mi)
- Elevation: 3.5 m (11 ft)
- Time zone: UTC+5:30 (IST)
- PIN: 734427/734428
- Telephone code: +91-05522
- Vehicle registration: WB

Batashi is a village in Kharibari CD block in Siliguri subdivision of Darjeeling district of West Bengal, India.

The nearest railway station to Batasi is Batasi railway station, which is around 1 km away and is now well connected with the Indian Railway Network.

== Geography ==
Places in the south-western portion of Siliguri subdivision in Darjeeling district
CT: census town, R: rural/ urban centre, F: facilities
Owing to space constraints in the small map, the actual locations in a larger map may vary slightly

=== Location ===
Batasi is located at 26.5995°N 88.1804°E.

Shyamdhan is shown as a census town in the map of Kharibari CD block on page 363 of the District Census Handbook, Darjeeling, 2011. Batasi was not identified as a separate populated place in the 2011 census.

The stretch of land lies in the Terai region at the base of the Himalayas. To the west, across the border river Mechi lies Nepal. The entire stretch of the land is covered by farm lands, tea estates and forests and small villages, consists of an area of 198.02 km^{2} (76.46 sq mi). The Gram area (village councils), viz. Batashi, Shyamdhan, Gondogol, Kungurpur, Bodrajote, West Bodrajote, Budsing, Shebaeram, Hatkhola.

=== Area overview ===
The map alongside shows the Siliguri subdivision of Darjeeling district. This area is spread across the foothills of the Himalayas and is a plain land gently sloping from north to south. While the northern part is mentioned as the Terai region, the larger southern portion forms the western part of the Dooars region. While 55.11% per cent of the population resides in the rural areas, 44.89% resides in the urban areas. On the western side the Mechi River forms a long border with Nepal. On the eastern side the Mahananda River forms a short border with Bangladesh.

Note: The map alongside presents some of the notable locations in the subdivision. All places marked in the map are linked in the larger full screen map.

== Transport ==
There is a station at Batasi on the Katihar-Siliguri line. It is 31.6 km (19.6 mi) from Siliguri.

== Education ==
Batashi has two major government high schools Sastrijee and Shyamdhan, there are many public and private primary schools.

- Batasi Sasrijee High School started in 1967. Class 5th-12th.
- Shyamdhan jote High School started in 1999-also Five Class Primary School.
- St.Anthony's School, Adhikari ESTD=2012.Affiliated to ICSE,New Delhi,Code:WB467.Secondary School.
- Adhikari Krisnakanta High School started in 1969. Class 5th-12th.
- DulalJote Nepali High School started in 2009.
- Rabindra Hindi Primary School started in 1968.
- Blue Heaven Academy, English School started in 2000. Private School.
- Mgd.Edu.Care Private School started in 2003.
- Vivekananda Sisu Tirtha Private School started In 2004
- Shri Sarada shishu Thirta School started in 2006. Private School.
- Sharadha Vidhya Phart School started in 2005. Private School.
