= Uttar Bagdogra =

- Census Town
- Location in West Bengal, India Uttar Bagdogra (India)
- Coordinates: 26.69°N 88.31°E
- Country: India
- State: West Bengal
- District: Darjeeling

Area
  - Total: 1.63 km^{2} (0.63 sq mi)

Population (2011)
  - Total: 25,044
  - Density: 15,400/km^{2} (39,800/sq mi)

Languages
  - Official: Bengali, English
- Time zone: UTC+5:30 (IST)
- Vehicle registration: WB 73/74
- Website: wb.gov.in

Uttar Bagdogra is a census town in the Siliguri subdivision of the Darjeeling district in the Indian state of West Bengal.

== Geography ==
Places in the south-western portion of Siliguri subdivision in Darjeeling district
CT: census town, R: rural/ urban centre, F: facilities
Owing to space constraints in the small map, the actual locations in a larger map may vary slightly

=== Location ===
Uttar Bagdogra is located at 26.69°N 88.31°E.

=== Area overview ===
The map alongside shows the Siliguri subdivision of Darjeeling district. This area is spread across the foothills of the Himalayas and is a plain land gently sloping from north to south. While the northern part is mentioned as the Terai region, the larger southern portion forms the western part of the Dooars region. While 55.11% per cent of the population resides in the rural areas, 44.89% resides in the urban areas. On the western side the Mechi River forms a long border with Nepal. On the eastern side the Mahananda River forms a short border with Bangladesh.

Note: The map alongside presents some of the notable locations in the subdivision. All places marked in the map are linked in the larger full screen map.

== Civic Administration ==
=== Police station ===
Bagdogra police station has jurisdiction over parts of Siliguri municipal corporation.

== Demographics ==
According to the 2011 Census of India, Uttar Bagdogra had a total population of 25,044 of which 13,781 (55%) were males and 11,263 (45%) were females. There were 2,597 persons in the age range of 0 to 6 years. The total number of literate people in Uttar Bagdogra was 20,227 (80.77% of the population over 6 years).

As of 2001 India census, Uttar Bagdogra had a population of 15,772. Males constitute 52% of the population and females 48%. Uttar Bagdogra has an average literacy rate of 75%, higher than the national average of 59.5%: male literacy is 81%, and female literacy is 68%. In Uttar Bagdogra, 12% of the population is under 6 years of age.

=== Languages ===
Languages spoken in Uttar Bagdogra (2011)
1. Bengali (27.6%)
2. Hindi (33.3%)
3. Nepali (18.1%)
4. Bhojpuri (4.16%)
5. Maithili (2.53%)
6. Odia (1.55%)
7. Others (12.8%)

== Infrastructure ==
According to the District Census Handbook 2011, Darjiling, Uttar Bagdogra covered an area of 1.63 km^{2}. Among the civic amenities, it had 20 km roads with open drains, the protected water supply involved tap water from treated sources and uncovered wells, it had 3,000 domestic electric connections. Among the medical facilities, it had 1 dispensary/ health centre, 1 maternity and child welfare centre, 1 nursing home. Among the educational facilities it had were 4 primary schools, 1 middle school, 1 secondary school, the nearest general degree college at Buridalson, 2.5 km away. Among the social, recreational and cultural facilities it had 1 cinema theatre. It had the branch of 1 nationalised bank.

== Transport ==
There is station at Bagdogra on the Katihar-Siliguri line.

Bagdogra Airport, (IATA: IXB, ICAO: VEBD), an international airport, is located nearby.

== Education ==
University of North Bengal was established at Raja Rammohunpur in 1962.

Kalipada Ghosh Tarai Mahavidyalaya was established at Bagdogra in 1988. Affiliated with the University of North Bengal, it offers honours courses in Bengali, Nepali, Hindi, English, geography, history, political science, sociology, accountancy, management, and general courses in arts, science and commerce.
