= Bagdogra =

Census town in West Bengal, India

- Settlement
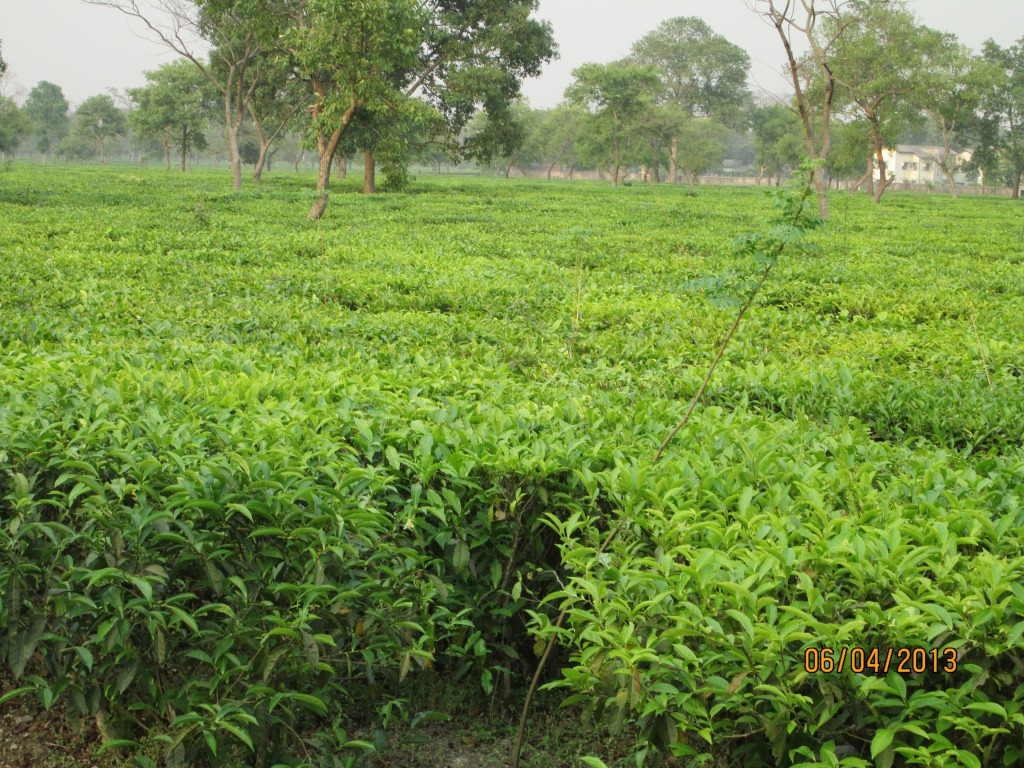
- Tea estate in Bagdogra

- Location in West Bengal, India Bagdogra (India) Bagdogra (Asia)
- Coordinates: 26°42′N 88°19′E
- Country: India
- State: West Bengal
- District: Darjeeling
- Subdivision: Siliguri
- Established: 1991

Government
  - Body: Upper Bagdogra Gram Panchayet / Lower Bagdogra Gram Panchayet

Area
  - Total: 10 km^{2} (3.9 sq mi)
- Elevation: 136 m (446 ft)

Languages
  - Official: Bengali
  - Additional official: English
- Time zone: UTC+5:30 (IST)
- Postal code: 734014 $734421
- Area code: 0353
- Vehicle registration: WB 73/74

Bagdogra (Bengali pronunciation: [baɡɖoɡra]), is a settlement in the Naxalbari CD block in the Siliguri subdivision of the Darjeeling district, in the Indian state of West Bengal. It is a part of the Greater Siliguri Metropolitan Area. Bagdogra is well connected by air to six major cities of India – Delhi, Mumbai, Bengaluru, Hyderabad, Kolkata and Chennai through the Bagdogra Airport. The Bagdogra railway station is also well connected.

== Geography ==
Places in the south-western portion of Siliguri subdivision in Darjeeling district
CT: census town, R: rural/ urban centre, F: facilities
Owing to space constraints in the small map, the actual locations in a larger map may vary slightly

=== Location ===
Bagdogra is located at 26.42°N 88.19°E, 11km away from Siliguri.

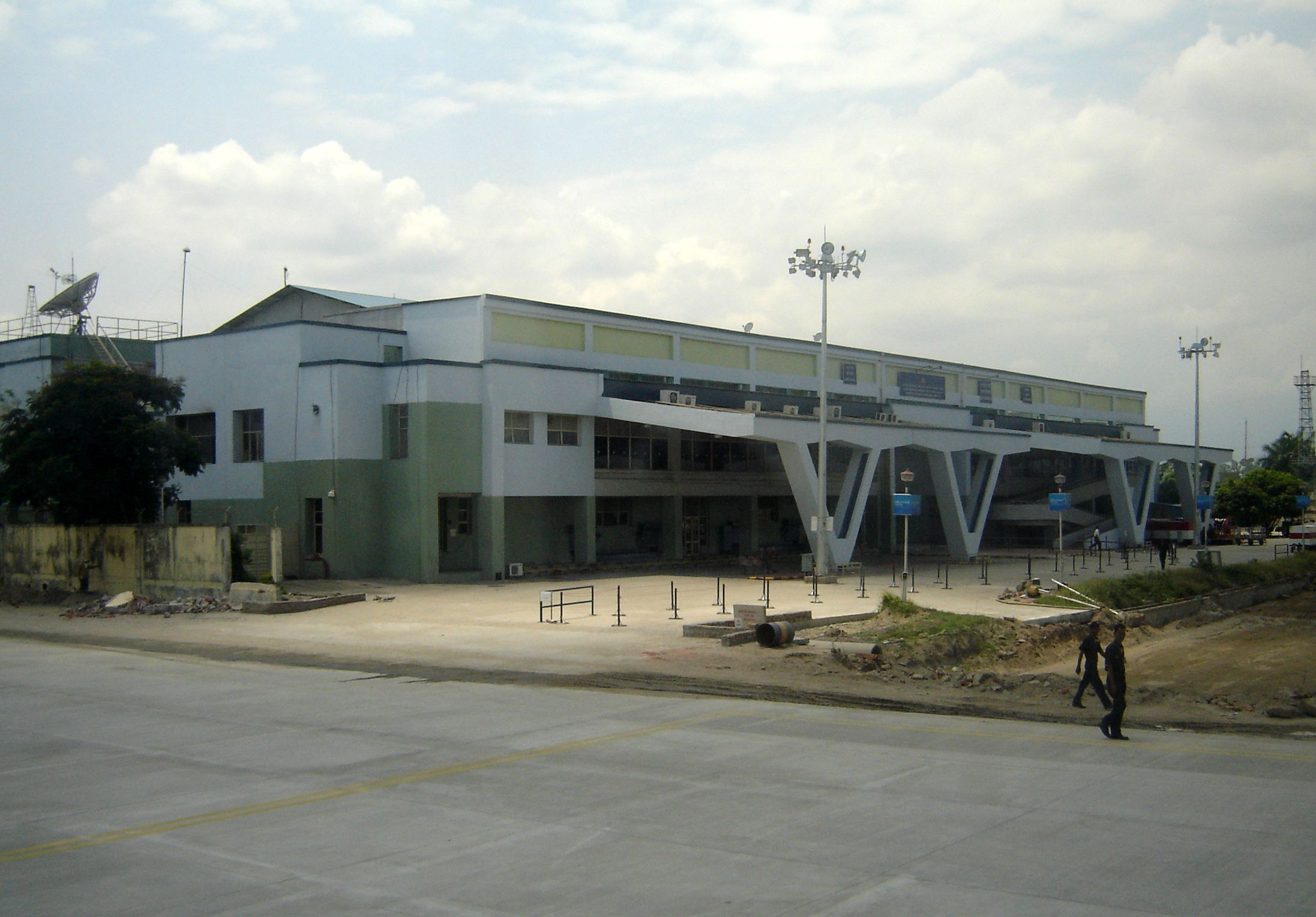
Bagdogra International Airport

=== Area overview ===
The map alongside shows the Siliguri subdivision of Darjeeling district. This area is spread across the foothills of the Himalayas and is a plain land gently sloping from north to south. While the northern part is mentioned as the Terai region, the larger southern portion forms the western part of the Dooars region. While 55.11% per cent of the population resides in the rural areas, 44.89% resides in the urban areas. On the western side the Mechi River forms a long border with Nepal. On the eastern side the Mahananda River forms a short border with Bangladesh. Note: The map alongside presents some of the notable locations in the subdivision. All places marked in the map are linked in the larger full screen map.

=== Climate ===
Climate data for Siliguri (Bagdogra Airport), 1991–2020 normals, extremes 1951–present
Month	Jan	Feb	Mar	Apr	May	Jun	Jul	Aug	Sep	Oct	Nov	Dec	Year
Record high °C (°F)	32.5 (90.5)	33.2 (91.8)	38.1 (100.6)	41.7 (107.1)	40.8 (105.4)	41.9 (107.4)	40.4 (104.7)	40.0 (104.0)	40.1 (104.2)	36.6 (97.9)	33.8 (92.8)	32.6 (90.7)	41.9 (107.4)
Mean maximum °C (°F)	25.6 (78.1)	27.9 (82.2)	32.8 (91.0)	34.9 (94.8)	35.3 (95.5)	36.3 (97.3)	36.0 (96.8)	36.7 (98.1)	35.8 (96.4)	33.5 (92.3)	30.4 (86.7)	27.2 (81.0)	37.0 (98.6)
Mean daily maximum °C (°F)	22.0 (71.6)	24.5 (76.1)	29.3 (84.7)	30.8 (87.4)	29.9 (85.8)	29.5 (85.1)	29.1 (84.4)	29.6 (85.3)	29.2 (84.6)	28.5 (83.3)	26.3 (79.3)	23.4 (74.1)	27.7 (81.8)
Mean daily minimum °C (°F)	10.7 (51.3)	12.8 (55.0)	16.1 (61.0)	19.5 (67.1)	22.1 (71.8)	24.0 (75.2)	24.6 (76.3)	24.6 (76.3)	23.5 (74.3)	19.7 (67.5)	15.2 (59.4)	11.8 (53.2)	18.7 (65.7)
Mean minimum °C (°F)	6.9 (44.4)	7.2 (45.0)	12.5 (54.5)	16.5 (61.7)	18.6 (65.5)	22.0 (71.6)	23.4 (74.1)	23.6 (74.5)	21.9 (71.4)	16.8 (62.2)	11.9 (53.4)	7.7 (45.9)	6.5 (43.7)
Record low °C (°F)	1.9 (35.4)	3.5 (38.3)	6.2 (43.2)	9.6 (49.3)	15.0 (59.0)	20.0 (68.0)	21.0 (69.8)	18.4 (65.1)	19.8 (67.6)	12.3 (54.1)	6.4 (43.5)	2.4 (36.3)	1.9 (35.4)
Average precipitation mm (inches)	23 (0.9)	24 (0.9)	34 (1.3)	76 (3.0)	249 (9.8)	628 (24.7)	843 (33.2)	589 (23.2)	403 (15.9)	121 (4.8)	10 (0.4)	11 (0.4)	3,011 (118.5)
Average rainy days	4	4	5	11	17	20	21	20	18	8	2	2	132
Average relative humidity (%)	69	65	54	63	79	88	90	88	87	80	70	68	75
Average ultraviolet index	5	7	9	11	12	13	14	13	11	8	5	4	9
Source 1: normal temperaturesUltraviolet Index
Source 2: Extremes(India Meteorological Department), Mean maximum and Mean minimum temperatures

== Civic administration ==
=== Police station ===
Bagdogra police station has jurisdiction over parts of Siliguri Municipal Corporation.

== Transport ==
=== Airway ===
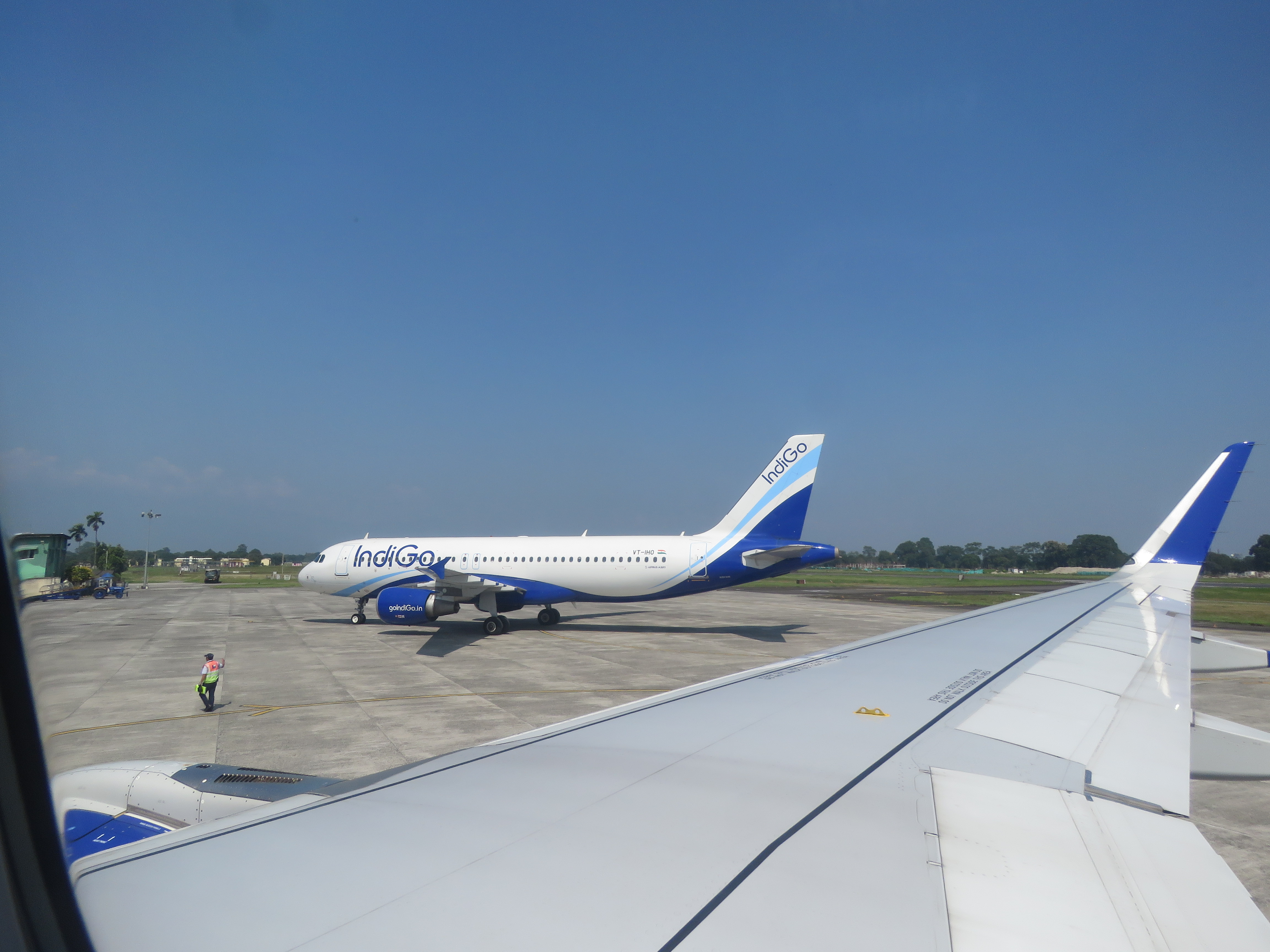
Bagdogra Airport

The Bagdogra International Airport (IATA: IXB, ICAO: VEBD) is located in about 16 km (9.9 mi) west of the city of Siliguri in the Darjeeling district in northern West Bengal, India. It is operated as a civil enclave at Air Force Station Bagdogra. It is the gateway airport to the hill station towns of Darjeeling, Kurseong, Mirik, and Kalimpong and the state of Sikkim, and sees thousands of tourists annually. Permits for foreign tourists intending to journey to Sikkim are issued at this airport, and it also serves as a major hub in the region, with flights connecting to Kolkata, New Delhi, Mumbai, Bangalore, Chennai, Hyderabad, Guwahati, Paro and Bangkok. The airport also has regular helicopter flights to Gangtok, the capital of Sikkim. The central government of India conferred it international airport status in 2002 with limited international operations.

=== Railway ===
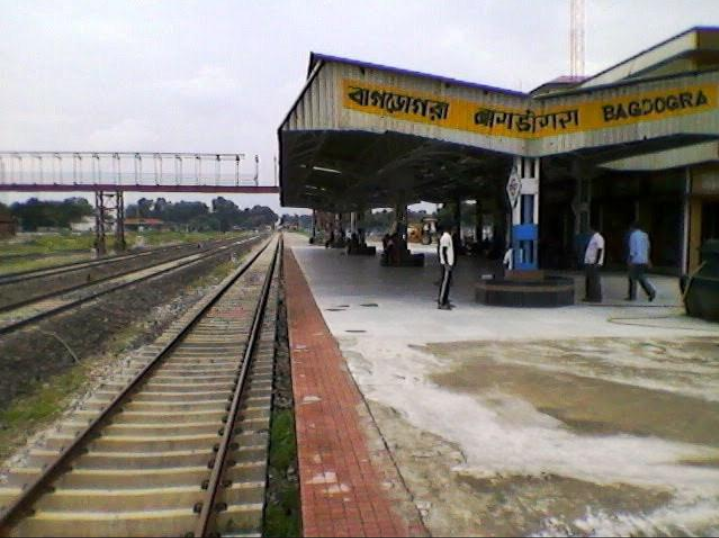
Bagdogra Railway Station

Bagdogra Railway Station comes under Northeast Frontier Railway zone (NFR) and Siliguri-Katihar Railway Line. The station code of Bagdogra is (BORA).

=== Roadway ===
It has two National Highways :- NH 31 and NH 31C. It also has Asian Highway (AH2) which is connected with Nepal and Bangladesh. It provides a gateway to North - East India.

== Education ==
The University of North Bengal was established at Raja Rammohunpur in 1962.

Kalipada Ghosh Tarai Mahavidyalaya was established at Bagdogra in 1988. Affiliated with the University of North Bengal, it offers honours courses in Bengali, Nepali, Hindi, English, geography, history, political science, sociology, accountancy, management, and general courses in arts, science and commerce.
