= Siliguri subdivision =

- Subdivision
- Interactive map of Siliguri subdivision
- Coordinates: 26.72°N 88.41°E
- Country: India
- State: West Bengal
- District: Darjeeling
- Headquarters: Siliguri

Government
  - Body: Municipal Corporation (urban); Mahakuma Parisad (rural)

Languages
  - Official: Bengali
  - Additional official: English
- Time zone: UTC+5:30 (IST)
- ISO 3166 code: IN-WB
- Vehicle registration: WB
- Website: www.siliguri.gov.in

Siliguri subdivision is a subdivision of the Darjeeling district in the state of West Bengal, India.

== Subdivisions ==
Darjeeling district is divided into the following administrative subdivisions:

Subdivision	Headquarters	Area km^{2}	Population (2011)	Rural % (2011)	Urban % (2011)
Darjeeling Sadar	Darjeeling	921.68	429,391	61.00	39.00
Kurseong	Kurseong	377.35	136,793	58.41	41.59
Mirik	Mirik	125.68	57,887	80.11	19.89
Siliguri	Siliguri	802.01	971,120	55.11	44.89
Darjeeling district	Darjeeling	2,226.72	1,595,191	57.89	42.11

Places in the North-eastern portion of Siliguri subdivision in Darjeeling district
CT: census town, R: rural/ urban centre, MC: municipal corporation, F: facilities
Abbreviations used in names – TG for Tea Garden, Jn RS for Junction Railway Station
New Jalpaiguri Junction railway station is in Jalpaiguri district
Owing to space constraints in the small map, the actual locations in a larger map may vary slightly
Places in the south-western portion of Siliguri subdivision in Darjeeling district
CT: census town, R: rural/ urban centre, F: facilities
Owing to space constraints in the small map, the actual locations in a larger map may vary slightly

== Police stations ==
Police stations in the Siliguri subdivision have the following features and jurisdiction:

Police Station	Area covered km^{2}	International border	Inter-state border km	Municipal Town	CD block
Naxalbari	n/a	*	-	-	Naxalbari
Kharibari	n/a	*	**	-	Kharibari
Phansidewa	n/a	*	-	-	Phansidewa
Matigara	n/a/	-	-	-	Matigara
Bagdogra	n/a	-	-	Siliguri	-
Pradhan Nagar	n/a	-	-	Siliguri	-
Siliguri	n/a	-	-	Siliguri	-
Siliguri Women	n/a	-	-	Siliguri	-

.* The total length of border with Nepal (Mechi River) is 101.02 km (62.77 mi). The total length ofborder with Bangladesh (Mahananda River) is 19.32 km (12.00 mi). .**The total length of border with Bihar is 48.30 km (30.01 mi)

== Gram panchayats ==
Gram panchayats in Siliguri subdivision are :

- Naxalbari block consists of 6 gram panchayats, viz. Naxalbari, Gossaipur, Hatighisa, Maniram, Uttar Bagdogra and Dakshin Bagdogra.
- Phansidewa block consists of 7 gram panchayats, viz. Phansidewa-Bansgoan, Chathat-Bansgaon, Bidhannagar-I, Bidhannagar-II, Ghospukur, Jalas-Nijamtara, and Hetmuri-Singhijhora.
- Kharibari block consists of 4 gram panchayats, viz. Kharibari-Panishali, Raniganj-Panishali, Binnabari, and Buraganj.
- Matigara block consist of 5 gram panchayats, viz. Atharakhai, Patharghata, Matigara I, Matigara II and Champasari.

== Blocks ==
Community development blocks in Siliguri subdivision are:

CD block	Headquarters	Area km^{2}	Population (2011)	SC %	ST %	Literacy Rate %	Census Towns
Naxalbari	Naxalbari	181.88	165,523	26.78	19.57	75.47	6
Kharibari	Kharibari	144.88	109,251	53.61	19.46	67.37	2
Phansidewa	Phansidewa	312.15	204,522	29.68	30.61	64.46	-
Matigara	Bairatisal	143.00	197,278	35.75	13.42	74.76	6

== Demographics ==
Religion in Siliguri sub-division (2011)
1. Hinduism (82.8%)
2. Islam (9.42%)
3. Christianity (6.33%)
4. Buddhism (0.78%)
5. Others (0.69%)

According to the 2011 census, Hindus numbered 803,888 and formed 82.78% of the population. Muslims numbered 91,478 and formed 9.42% of the population. Christians numbered 61,477 and formed 6.33% of the population. Buddhists numbered 7,534 and formed 0.78% of the population. Others numbered 6,733 and formed 0.69% of the population.

== Education ==
Given in the table below (data in numbers) is a comprehensive picture of the education scenario in Darjeeling district, with data for the year 2012-13.

Subdivision	Primary School		Middle School		High School		Higher Secondary School		General College, Univ		Technical / Professional Instt		Non-formal Education	
Subdivision	Institution	Student	Institution	Student	Institution	Student	Institution	Student	Institution	Student	Institution	Student	Institution	Student
Darjeeling Sadar	579	37,345	28	8,019	37	22,579	23	16,492	7	9,510	6	1,095	1,142	28,425
Kurseong	218	13,031	3	721	28	10,596	9	7,783	1	2,034	4	866	367	14,261
Mirik	78	7,211	3	919	6	2,131	2	2,127	1	715	-	-	309	20,265
Siliguri	676	79,713	30	8,585	46	23,903	67	100,845	10	13,398	13	3,161	1,793	96,766
Darjeeling district	1,551	137,300	64	18,244	117	59,290	101	127,247	19	25,657	23	5,122	3,611	159,717

Note: Primary schools include junior basic schools; middle schools, high schools and higher secondary schools include madrasahs; technical schools include junior technical schools, junior government polytechnics, industrial technical institutes, industrial training centres, nursing training institutes etc.; technical and professional colleges include engineering colleges, medical colleges, para-medical institutes, management colleges, teachers training and nursing training colleges, law colleges, art colleges, music colleges etc. Special and non-formal education centres include sishu siksha kendras, madhyamik siksha kendras, centres of Rabindra mukta vidyalaya, recognised Sanskrit tols, institutions for the blind and other handicapped persons, Anganwadi centres, reformatory schools etc.

=== Educational institutions ===
The following institutions are located in Siliguri subdivision:

- University of North Bengal was established at Raja Rammohunpur in 1962.
- Siliguri College was established in 1950 at Siliguri.
- Siliguri Mahila Mahabidyalaya was established at Siiguri in 1981.
- Acharya Prafulla Chandra Roy Government College was established in 2010 at Siliguri.
- Siliguri College of Commerce was established at Siliguri in 1962.
- Munshi Premchand Mahavidyalaya was established in 2008 at Siliguri.
- Gyan Jyoti College was established in 2005 at Siliguri.
- Nakshalbari College was established in 2008 at Naxalbari.
- Indian Institute of Legal Studies was established in 2009 at Siliguri.
- North Bengal Medical College was established in 1968 at Shushrut Nagar.
- North Bengal Dental College was established in 1990 at Shushrut Nagar.

== Healthcare ==
The table below (all data in numbers) presents an overview of the medical facilities available and patients treated in the hospitals, health centres and sub-centres in 2013 in Darjeeling district, with data for the year 2012-13.:

Subdivision	Health & Family Welfare Deptt, WB				Other State Govt Deptts	Local bodies	Central Govt Deptts / PSUs	NGO / Private Nursing Homes	Total	Total Number of Beds	Total Number of Doctors*	Indoor Patients	Outdoor Patients
Subdivision	Hospitals	Rural Hospitals	Block Primary Health Centres	Primary Health Centres	Other State Govt Deptts	Local bodies	Central Govt Deptts / PSUs	NGO / Private Nursing Homes	Total	Total Number of Beds	Total Number of Doctors*	Indoor Patients	Outdoor Patients
Darjeeling Sadar	3	2	1	6	1	-	-	3	16	729	32	22,584	149,465
Kurseong	4	1	-	3	-	-	1	-	9	554	22	9,097	132,488
Mirik	-	1	0	3	-	-	-	-	4	42	44	2,354	57,243
Siliguri	3	3	1	4	1	-	4	47	63	1,146	168	133,086	1,738,671
Darjeeling district	10	7	2	16	2	-	5	50	92	2,471	266	167,121	1,738.671

.* Excluding nursing homes.

=== Medical facilities ===
Medical facilities in Siliguri subdivision are as follows:

Hospitals: (Name, location, beds)

- North Bengal Medical College and Hospital, Shushrut Nagar, 589 beds
- North Bengal Dental College, Shushrut Nagar (OPD only)
- Siliguri District Hospital, Siliguri, 320 beds
- BSF Hospital, Kadamtala, Siliguri, 50 beds

Rural Hospitals: (Name, CD block, location, beds)

- Naxalbari Rural Hospital, Naxalbari CD block, Naxalbari, 50 beds
- Kharibari Rural Hospital, Kharibari CD block, Kharibari, 34 beds
- Phansidewa Rural Hospital, Phansidewa CD block, Phansidewa, 30 beds

Block Primary Health Centres: (Name, CD block, location, beds)

- Matigara Block Primary Health Centre, Matigara CD block, Matigarahat, 10 beds

Primary Health Centres : (CD block-wise)(CD block, PHC location, beds)

- Naxalbari CD block: Bagdogra (10)
- Phansidewa CD block: Bidhannagar (10)
- Kharibari CD block: Rangali (6), Batasi (PO Badrajote) (10)

== Legislative segments ==
As per order of the Delimitation Commission in respect of the delimitation of constituencies in the West Bengal, the ward no. 1 to 30 and 45 to 47 of the Siliguri municipal corporation will constitute the Siliguri assembly constituency of West Bengal. The Phansidewa block and the Kharibari block constitute the Phansidewa assembly constituency. The three villages of Sitong Forest, Sivok Hill Forest and Sivok Forest under the Champasari gram panchayat of the Matigara block will be part of Kurseong assembly constituency. Rest of the area under the Matigara block and the area under the Naxalbari block will constitute the Matigara–Naxalbari assembly constituency. The Phansidewa constituency will be reserved for Scheduled tribes (ST) candidates. The Matigara–Naxalbari constituency will be reserved for Scheduled castes (SC) candidates. All these four constituencies will be part of the Darjeeling Lok Sabha constituency.
