= Mechi River =

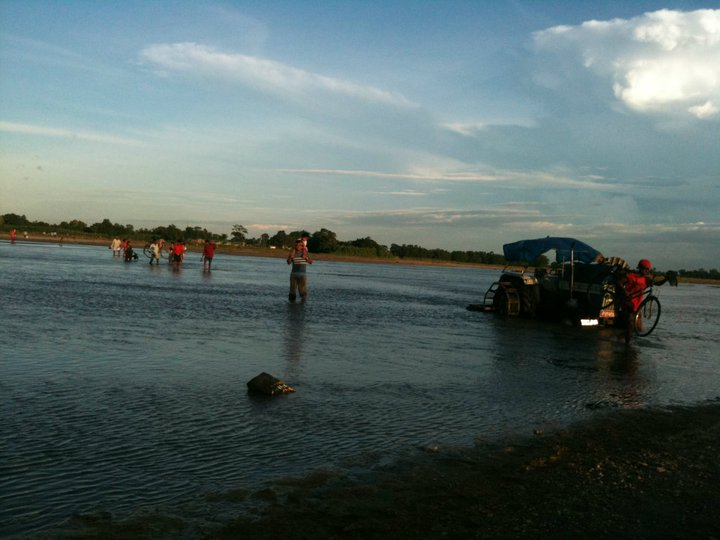

- Mechi River near West Bengal–Bihar border Mechi River (India)

Location
- Country: Nepal, India

Physical characteristics
- Source: Mahabharat Lekh
  - location: Mahabharat Lekh, Nepal
- Mouth: Mahananda River
  - location: Kishanganj district, Bihar, India
  - coordinates: 26°13′46″N 87°57′05″E

The Mechi River is a trans-boundary river flowing through Nepal and India. It is a tributary of the Mahananda River.

== Course ==
The Mechi originates in the Mahabharat Range in Nepal. It flows through Nepal, forms the boundary between India and Nepal and then flows through the Indian state of Bihar to join the Mahananda in Kishanganj district.

The Mechi-Mahananda interfluve is a transitional area between the hills and the plains and exhibits a wide range of topographical variations. The rivers originating in the hills attain a braiding character and have well-developed alluvial fans.

The Mahananda river system of which Mechi is a part has a catchment area of 8,088 square kilometres (3,123 sq mi) in Nepal and 11,520 square kilometres (4,450 sq mi) in India.

=== Embankments ===
Embankments exist of the left bank of the Mechi River for 14 kilometres (9 mi) in West Bengal. These need remodelling to prevent floods in the Naxalbari area of Darjeeling district. There also is a need for new embankments. As the Mechi forms the international border, it was agreed at a meeting of the Nepal-India Joint Standing Technical Committee to take due care in aligning the embankments so that they would be at identified distance from the border and the top levels of the embankments should be kept same on both sides, as far as practicable.

== River linking ==
There is a proposal to link the Mechi to the Kosi. Kosi–Mechi interlinking is part of a NPR 56000 billion River Interlinking Project proposed to Nepal by India. The Kankai forms part of this project. Besides the High Dam, a barrage across Kosi river will also be constructed near village Chatra, 10 to 12 kilometres (6 to 7 mi) below the proposed Kosi High Dam, to transfer water to the Mechi through the Kosi–Mechi link canal.

== See also ==
- List of rivers of Nepal
