= 2024 elections in India =

2024 Indian elections
- ← 2022 2023 2024 2025 2026 →
- Incumbent Prime Minister: Narendra Modi (BJP)
- Next Lok Sabha: 18th

Lok Sabha elections
- Overall control: NDA hold
- Seats contested: All 543 seats
- Net seat change: NDA -60

Rajya Sabha elections
- Overall control: NDA gain
- Seats contested: 84 of 243 seats
- Net seat change: NDA +13

State elections
- States contested: 8
- Net state change: NDA +2

State by-elections
- Seats contested: 86
- Net seat change: NDA +13

The 2024 elections in India includes the Lok Sabha Election and elections to the Rajya Sabha, state legislative assemblies, rural and urban local bodies.

== Lok Sabha election ==
General elections were held from 19 April to 1 June 2024 in seven phases to elect 543 members of the 18th Lok Sabha.

Date*	Election	Government before	Prime Minister before	Government after	Elected Prime Minister
19 April – 1 June 2024	Lok Sabha	National Democratic Alliance	Narendra Modi	National Democratic Alliance	Narendra Modi

== Lok Sabha by-elections ==
#	Date	Constituency	State/UT	Previous MP		Reason	Elected MP	
1	13 November 2024	Wayanad	Kerala	Rahul Gandhi	Indian National Congress	Resigned on 18 June 2024	Priyanka Gandhi	Indian National Congress
2	20 November 2024	Nanded	Maharashtra	Vasantrao Balwantrao Chavan	Indian National Congress	Died on 26 August 2024	Ravindra Vasantrao Chavan	Indian National Congress

== Rajya Sabha elections ==
Elections for 84 seats in the Rajya Sabha were held on 19 January, 27 February, 25 June, and 3 September 2024.

Date	Election	Majority before	Majority after
January - December 2024	Rajya Sabha	None	National Democratic Alliance

== Legislative assembly elections ==
The elections for the following state legislative assemblies took place in 2024.

Date(s)	State	Government before	Chief Minister before	Government after	Elected Chief Minister	Maps
19 April 2024	Arunachal Pradesh	Bharatiya Janata Party	Pema Khandu	Bharatiya Janata Party	Pema Khandu	
19 April 2024	Sikkim	Sikkim Krantikari Morcha	Prem Singh Tamang	Sikkim Krantikari Morcha	Prem Singh Tamang	
13 May 2024	Andhra Pradesh	YSR Congress Party	Y. S. Jagan Mohan Reddy	Telugu Desam Party	N. Chandrababu Naidu	
13 May – 1 June 2024	Odisha	Biju Janata Dal	Naveen Patnaik	Bharatiya Janata Party	Mohan Charan Majhi	
18 September – 1 October 2024	Jammu and Kashmir	President's Rule		Jammu & Kashmir National Conference	Omar Abdullah	
5 October 2024	Haryana	Bharatiya Janata Party	Nayab Singh Saini	Bharatiya Janata Party	Nayab Singh Saini	
13 – 20 November 2024	Jharkhand	Jharkhand Mukti Morcha	Hemant Soren	Jharkhand Mukti Morcha	Hemant Soren	
13 – 20 November 2024	Jharkhand	Indian National Congress	Hemant Soren	Indian National Congress	Hemant Soren	
20 November 2024	Maharashtra	Bharatiya Janata Party	Eknath Shinde	Bharatiya Janata Party	Devendra Fadnavis	
20 November 2024	Maharashtra	Shiv Sena	Eknath Shinde	Shiv Sena	Devendra Fadnavis	
20 November 2024	Maharashtra	Nationalist Congress Party	Eknath Shinde	Nationalist Congress Party	Devendra Fadnavis	

== Legislative Assembly by-elections ==
=== Assam ===
Date	Constituency		Previous MLA		Reason	Elected MLA	
13 November 2024	11	Dholai	Parimal Suklabaidya	Bharatiya Janata Party	Elected to Lok Sabha on 4 June 2024	Nihar Ranjan Das	Bharatiya Janata Party
13 November 2024	31	Sidli	Joyanta Basumatary	United People's Party Liberal	Elected to Lok Sabha on 4 June 2024	Nirmal Kumar Brahma	United People's Party Liberal
13 November 2024	32	Bongaigaon	Phani Bhusan Choudhury	Asom Gana Parishad	Elected to Lok Sabha on 4 June 2024	Diptimayee Choudhury	Asom Gana Parishad
13 November 2024	77	Behali	Ranjit Dutta	Bharatiya Janata Party	Elected to Lok Sabha on 4 June 2024	Diganta Ghatowal	Bharatiya Janata Party
13 November 2024	88	Samaguri	Rakibul Hussain	Indian National Congress	Elected to Lok Sabha on 4 June 2024	Diplu Ranjan Sarmah	Bharatiya Janata Party

=== Bihar ===
Date	Constituency		Previous MLA		Reason	Elected MLA	
1 June 2024	195	Agiaon	Manoj Manzil	Communist Party of India (Marxist–Leninist) Liberation	Disqualified on 16 February 2024	Shiv Prakash Ranjan	Communist Party of India (Marxist–Leninist) Liberation
10 July 2024	60	Rupauli	Bima Bharti	Janata Dal (United)	Resigned on 11 April 2024	Shankar Singh	Independent
13 November 2024	196	Tarari	Sudama Prasad	Communist Party of India (Marxist–Leninist) Liberation	Elected to Lok Sabha on June 4, 2024	Vishal Prashant	Bharatiya Janata Party
13 November 2024	203	Ramgarh	Sudhakar Singh	Rashtriya Janata Dal	Elected to Lok Sabha on June 4, 2024	Ashok Kumar Singh	Bharatiya Janata Party
13 November 2024	227	Imamganj	Jitan Ram Manjhi	Hindustani Awam Morcha	Elected to Lok Sabha on June 4, 2024	Deepa Manjhi	Hindustani Awam Morcha
13 November 2024	232	Belaganj	Surendra Prasad Yadav	Rashtriya Janata Dal	Elected to Lok Sabha on June 4, 2024	Manorama Devi	Janata Dal (United)

=== Chhattisgarh ===
Date	Constituency		Previous MLA		Reason	Elected MLA	
13 November 2024	51	Raipur City South	Brijmohan Agrawal	Bharatiya Janata Party	Elected to Lok Sabha on June 4, 2024	Sunil Kumar Soni	Bharatiya Janata Party

=== Gujarat ===
Date	Constituency		Previous MLA		Reason	Elected MLA	
7 May 2024	26	Vijapur	C. J. Chavda	Indian National Congress	Resigned on 19 January 2024	C. J. Chavda	Bharatiya Janata Party
7 May 2024	83	Porbandar	Arjun Modhwadia	Indian National Congress	Resigned on 4 March 2024	Arjun Modhwadia	Bharatiya Janata Party
7 May 2024	85	Manavadar	Arvindbhai Ladani	Indian National Congress	Resigned on 6 March 2024	Arvindbhai Ladani	Bharatiya Janata Party
7 May 2024	108	Khambhat	Chirag Patel	Indian National Congress	Resigned on 19 December 2023	Chirag Patel	Bharatiya Janata Party
7 May 2024	136	Vaghodiya	Dharmendrasinh Vaghela	Independent	Resigned on 25 January 2024	Dharmendrasinh Vaghela	Bharatiya Janata Party
13 November 2024	7	Vav	Geni Thakor	Indian National Congress	Elected to Lok Sabha on 4 June 2024	Swarupji Thakor	Bharatiya Janata Party

=== Haryana ===
Date	Constituency		Previous MLA		Reason	Elected MLA	
25 May 2024	21	Karnal	Manohar Lal Khattar	Bharatiya Janata Party	Resigned on 13 March 2024	Nayab Singh Saini	Bharatiya Janata Party

=== Himachal Pradesh ===
Date	Constituency		Previous MLA		Reason	Elected MLA	
1 June 2024	18	Dharamshala	Sudhir Sharma	Indian National Congress	Disqualified on 29 February 2024	Sudhir Sharma	Bharatiya Janata Party
1 June 2024	21	Lahaul and Spiti	Ravi Thakur	Indian National Congress	Disqualified on 29 February 2024	Anuradha Rana	Indian National Congress
1 June 2024	37	Sujanpur	Rajinder Rana	Indian National Congress	Disqualified on 29 February 2024	Ranjit Singh	Indian National Congress
1 June 2024	39	Barsar	Inder Dutt Lakhanpal	Indian National Congress	Disqualified on 29 February 2024	Inder Dutt Lakhanpal	Bharatiya Janata Party
1 June 2024	42	Gagret	Chaitanya Sharma	Indian National Congress	Disqualified on 29 February 2024	Rakesh Kalia	Indian National Congress
1 June 2024	45	Kutlehar	Davinder Kumar Bhutto	Indian National Congress	Disqualified on 29 February 2024	Vivek Sharma	Indian National Congress
10 July 2024	10	Dehra	Hoshyar Singh	Independent	Resigned on 22 March 2024	Kamlesh Thakur	Indian National Congress
10 July 2024	38	Hamirpur	Ashish Sharma	Independent	Resigned on 22 March 2024	Ashish Sharma	Bharatiya Janata Party
10 July 2024	51	Nalagarh	K.L. Thakur	Independent	Resigned on 22 March 2024	Hardeep Singh Bawa	Indian National Congress

=== Jharkhand ===
Date	Constituency		Previous MLA		Reason	Elected MLA	Party
20 May 2024	31	Gandey	Sarfaraz Ahmad	Jharkhand Mukti Morcha	Resigned on 1 January 2024	Kalpana Soren	Jharkhand Mukti Morcha

=== Karnataka ===
Date	Constituency		Previous MLA		Reason	Elected MLA	
7 May 2024	36	Shorapur	Raja Venkatappa Naik	Indian National Congress	Died on 24 February 2024	Raja Venugopal Naik	Indian National Congress
13 November 2024	83	Shiggaon	Basavaraj Bommai	Bharatiya Janata Party	Elected to Lok Sabha on 4 June 2024	Yasir Ahmed Khan Pathan	Indian National Congress
13 November 2024	95	Sandur	E. Tukaram	Indian National Congress	Elected to Lok Sabha on 4 June 2024	E. Annapoorna Tukaram	Indian National Congress
13 November 2024	185	Channapatna	H. D. Kumaraswamy	Janata Dal (Secular)	Elected to Lok Sabha on 4 June 2024	C. P. Yogeshwara	Indian National Congress

=== Kerala ===
Date	Constituency		Previous MLA		Reason	Elected MLA	
20 November 2024	56	Palakkad	Shafi Parambil	Indian National Congress	Elected to Lok Sabha on 4 June	Rahul Mamkootathil	Indian National Congress
13 November 2024	61	Chelakkara	K. Radhakrishnan	Communist Party of India (Marxist)	Elected to Lok Sabha on 4 June	U. R. Pradeep	Communist Party of India (Marxist)

=== Madhya Pradesh ===
Date	Constituency		Previous MLA		Reason	Elected MLA	Party
10 July 2024	123	Amarwara	Kamlesh Shah	Indian National Congress	Resigned on 29 March 2024	Kamlesh Shah	Bharatiya Janata Party
13 November 2024	2	Vijaypur	Ramnivas Rawat	Indian National Congress	Resigned on 8 July 2024	Mukesh Malhotra	Indian National Congress
13 November 2024	156	Budhni	Shivraj Singh Chouhan	Bharatiya Janata Party	Elected to Lok Sabha on 4 June	Ramakant Bhargava	Bharatiya Janata Party

=== Meghalaya ===
Date	Constituency		Previous MLA		Reason	Elected MLA	Party
13 November 2024	56	Gambegre	Saleng A. Sangma	Indian National Congress	Elected to Lok Sabha on 4 June	Mehtab Chandee Agitok Sangma	National People's Party

=== Punjab ===
Date	Constituency		Previous MLA		Reason	Elected MLA	
10 July 2024	34	Jalandhar West	Sheetal Angural	Aam Aadmi Party	Resigned on 28 March 2024	Mohinder Bhagat	Aam Aadmi Party
20 November 2024	44	Chabbewal	Raj Kumar Chabbewal	Indian National Congress	Resigned on 15 March 2024	Ishank Kumar	Aam Aadmi Party
20 November 2024	10	Dera Baba Nanak	Sukhjinder Singh Randhawa	Indian National Congress	Elected to Lok Sabha on 4 June 2024	Gurdeep Singh Randhawa	Aam Aadmi Party
20 November 2024	84	Gidderbaha	Amrinder Singh Raja Warring	Indian National Congress	Elected to Lok Sabha on 4 June 2024	Hardeep Singh Dimpy Dhillon	Aam Aadmi Party
20 November 2024	103	Barnala	Gurmeet Singh Meet Hayer	Aam Aadmi Party	Elected to Lok Sabha on 4 June 2024	Kuldeep Singh Dhillon	Indian National Congress

=== Rajasthan ===
Date	Constituency		Previous MLA		Reason	Elected MLA	
26 April 2024	165	Bagidora	Mahendrajeet Singh Malviya	Indian National Congress	Resigned on 19 February 2024	Jaikrishn Patel	Bharat Adivasi Party
13 November 2024	27	Jhunjhunu	Brijendra Singh Ola	Indian National Congress	Elected to Lok Sabha on 4 June 2024	Rajendra Bhamboo	Bharatiya Janata Party
13 November 2024	67	Ramgarh	Zubair Khan	Indian National Congress	Died on 14 September 2024	Sukhavant Singh	Bharatiya Janata Party
13 November 2024	88	Dausa	Murari Lal Meena	Indian National Congress	Elected to Lok Sabha on 4 June 2024	Deen Dayal Bairwa	Indian National Congress
13 November 2024	97	Deoli-Uniara	Harish Chandra Meena	Indian National Congress	Elected to Lok Sabha on 4 June 2024	Rajendra Gurjar	Bharatiya Janata Party
13 November 2024	110	Khinwsar	Hanuman Beniwal	Rashtriya Loktantrik Party	Elected to Lok Sabha on 4 June 2024	Rewant Ram Danga	Bharatiya Janata Party
13 November 2024	156	Salumber	Amrit Lal Meena	Bharatiya Janata Party	Died on 8 August 2024	Shanta Amrit Lal Meena	Bharatiya Janata Party
13 November 2024	161	Chorasi	Rajkumar Roat	Bharat Adivasi Party	Elected to Lok Sabha on 4 June 2024	Anil Kumar Katara	Bharat Adivasi Party

=== Sikkim ===
Date	Constituency		Previous MLA		Reason	Elected MLA	
13 November 2024	7	Soreng-Chakung	Prem Singh Tamang	Sikkim Krantikari Morcha	Resigned on 14 June 2024	Aditya Tamang	Sikkim Krantikari Morcha
13 November 2024	11	Namchi-Singhithang	Krishna Kumari Rai	Sikkim Krantikari Morcha	Resigned on 13 June 2024	Satish Chandra Rai	Sikkim Krantikari Morcha

=== Tamil Nadu ===
Date	Constituency		Previous MLA		Reason	Elected MLA	
19 April 2024	233	Vilavancode	S. Vijayadharani	Indian National Congress	Resigned on 24 February 2024	Tharahai Cuthbert	Indian National Congress
10 July 2024	75	Vikravandi	N. Pugazhenthi	Dravida Munnetra Kazhagam	Died on 6 April 2024	Anniyur Siva	Dravida Munnetra Kazhagam

=== Telangana ===
Date	Constituency		Previous MLA		Reason	Elected MLA	
13 May 2024	71	Secunderabad Cantonment	G. Lasya Nanditha	Bharat Rashtra Samithi	Died on 23 February 2024	Sri Ganesh	Indian National Congress

=== Tripura ===
Date	Constituency		Previous MLA		Reason	Elected MLA	
19 April 2024	7	Ramnagar	Surajit Datta	Bharatiya Janata Party	Died on 27 December 2023	Dipak Majumder	Bharatiya Janata Party

=== Uttarakhand ===
Date	Constituency		Previous MLA		Reason	Elected MLA	
10 July 2024	4	Badrinath	Rajendra Singh Bhandari	Indian National Congress	Resigned on 17 March 2024	Lakhpat Singh Butola	Indian National Congress
10 July 2024	33	Manglaur	Sarwat Karim Ansari	Bahujan Samaj Party	Died on 30 October 2023	Muhammad Nizamuddin	Indian National Congress
20 November 2024	7	Kedarnath	Shaila Rani Rawat	Bharatiya Janata Party	Died on 9 July 2024	Asha Nautiyal	Bharatiya Janata Party

=== Uttar Pradesh ===
Date	Constituency		Previous MLA		Reason	Elected MLA	
13 May 2024	136	Dadraul	Manvendra Singh	Bharatiya Janata Party	Died on 5 January 2024	Arvind Kumar Singh	Bharatiya Janata Party
20 May 2024	173	Lucknow East	Ashutosh Tandon	Bharatiya Janata Party	Died on 9 November 2023	O. P. Srivastava	Bharatiya Janata Party
25 May 2024	292	Gainsari	Shiv Pratap Yadav	Samajwadi Party	Died on 28 January 2024	Rakesh Kumar Yadav	Samajwadi Party
1 June 2024	403	Duddhi	Ramdular Gaur	Bharatiya Janata Party	Disqualified on 15 December 2023	Vijay Singh Gond	Samajwadi Party
20 November 2024	16	Meerapur	Chandan Chauhan	Rashtriya Lok Dal	Elected to Lok Sabha on 4 June 2024	Mithlesh Pal	Rashtriya Lok Dal
20 November 2024	29	Kundarki	Ziaur Rahman Barq	Samajwadi Party	Elected to Lok Sabha on 4 June 2024	Ramveer Singh	Bharatiya Janata Party
20 November 2024	56	Ghaziabad	Atul Garg	Bharatiya Janata Party	Elected to Lok Sabha on 4 June 2024	Sanjeev Sharma	Bharatiya Janata Party
20 November 2024	71	Khair	Anoop Pradhan	Bharatiya Janata Party	Elected to Lok Sabha on 4 June 2024	Surender Diler	Bharatiya Janata Party
20 November 2024	110	Karhal	Akhilesh Yadav	Samajwadi Party	Elected to Lok Sabha on 4 June 2024	Tej Pratap Singh Yadav	Samajwadi Party
20 November 2024	213	Sishamau	Haji Irfan Solanki	Samajwadi Party	Disqualified on 7 June 2024	Naseem Solanki	Samajwadi Party
20 November 2024	256	Phulpur	Praveen Patel	Bharatiya Janata Party	Elected to Lok Sabha on 4 June 2024	Deepak Patel	Bharatiya Janata Party
20 November 2024	277	Katehari	Lalji Verma	Samajwadi Party	Elected to Lok Sabha on 4 June 2024	Dharmraj Nishad	Bharatiya Janata Party
20 November 2024	397	Majhawan	Vinod Kumar Bind	NISHAD Party	Elected to Lok Sabha on 4 June 2024	Suchismita Maurya	Bharatiya Janata Party

=== West Bengal ===
Date	Constituency		Previous MLA		Reason	Elected MLA	
7 May 2024	62	Bhagabangola	Idris Ali	Trinamool Congress	Died on 16 February 2024	Reyat Hossain Sarkar	Trinamool Congress
1 June 2024	113	Baranagar	Tapas Roy	Trinamool Congress	Resigned on 4 March 2024	Sayantika Banerjee	Trinamool Congress
10 July 2024	35	Raiganj	Krishna Kalyani	Bharatiya Janata Party	Resigned on 27 March 2024	Krishna Kalyani	Trinamool Congress
10 July 2024	90	Ranaghat Dakshin	Mukut Mani Adhikari	Bharatiya Janata Party	Resigned on 19 April 2024	Mukut Mani Adhikari	Trinamool Congress
10 July 2024	94	Bagdah	Biswajit Das	Bharatiya Janata Party	Resigned on 19 April 2024	Madhuparna Thakur	Trinamool Congress
10 July 2024	167	Maniktala	Sadhan Pande	Trinamool Congress	Died on 20 February 2022 (Note: The seat fell vacant due to the death of sitting MLA Sadhan Pande on 20th February 2022. However, by-polls to the seat couldn't be held even after 6 months of Pande's death (according to Indian law) because BJP candidate Kalyan Chaubey filed an election petition in the Calcutta High Court alleging irregularities in polling & demanded a recount of votes. The Representation of the People Act, 1951 forbids holding any polls to the seat until any election petition concerning that seat hasn't been resolved at the court. On 29 April 2024, Choubey withdrew his election petition from the court, making way for by-poll to the seat.)	Supti Pandey	Trinamool Congress
13 November 2024	6	Sitai	Jagadish Chandra Barma Basunia	Trinamool Congress	Elected to Lok Sabha on 4 June 2024	Sangita Roy	Trinamool Congress
13 November 2024	14	Madarihat	Manoj Tigga	Bharatiya Janata Party	Elected to Lok Sabha on 4 June 2024	Jay Prakash Toppo	Trinamool Congress
13 November 2024	104	Naihati	Partha Bhowmick	Trinamool Congress	Elected to Lok Sabha on 4 June 2024	Sanat Dey	Trinamool Congress
13 November 2024	121	Haroa	Haji Nurul Islam	Trinamool Congress	Elected to Lok Sabha on 4 June 2024	Sheikh Rabiul Islam	Trinamool Congress
13 November 2024	236	Medinipur	June Malia	Trinamool Congress	Elected to Lok Sabha on 4 June 2024	Sujoy Hazra	Trinamool Congress
13 November 2024	251	Taldangra	Arup Chakraborty	Trinamool Congress	Elected to Lok Sabha on 4 June 2024	Falguni Singhababu	Trinamool Congress

== Local body elections ==
=== Assam ===
Date	Governing body	Government before	Government after
8 January 2024	Dima Hasao Autonomous Council	Bharatiya Janata Party	Bharatiya Janata Party

=== Punjab ===
Date	Governing body	Government before	Government after
21 December 2024	Amritsar Municipal Corporation	Indian National Congress	Aam Aadmi Party
21 December 2024	Jalandhar Municipal Corporation	Indian National Congress	Aam Aadmi Party
21 December 2024	Patiala Municipal Corporation	Indian National Congress	Aam Aadmi Party
21 December 2024	Ludhiana Municipal Corporation	Indian National Congress	Aam Aadmi Party
21 December 2024	Phagwara Municipal Corporation	Bharatiya Janata Party	Aam Aadmi Party

== See also ==
- 2023 elections in India
- 2024 Rajya Sabha elections
- 2025 elections in India
- list of elections in 2024
