= 11th Sikkim Assembly =

Legislature of Sikkim from 2024

←	10th Assembly	12th Assembly	→

Overview
- Legislative body: Sikkim Legislative Assembly
- Election: 2024 Sikkim Legislative Assembly election
- Opposition: None
- Members: 32
- Leader of the Opposition: Vacant (Note: No party secured 10% of seats to form official opposition.)
- Party control: Sikkim Krantikari Morcha

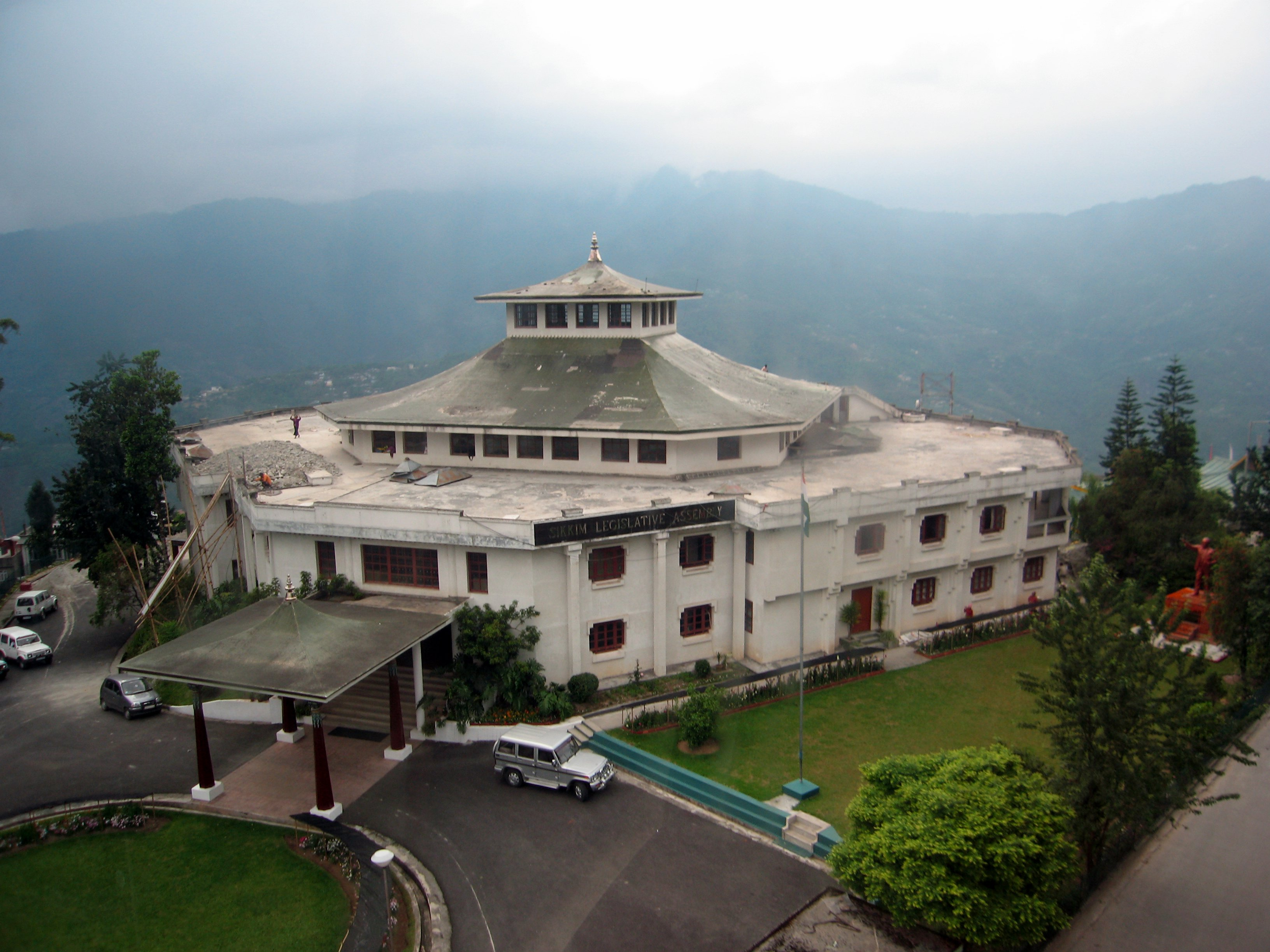
Sikkim Legislative Assembly building in Gangtok

The Eleventh Legislative Assembly of Sikkim constituted after the 2024 Sikkim Legislative Assembly election. The results being declared on 2 June 2024.

== Members of Legislative Assembly ==
The Eleventh assembly was elected in 2024 Sikkim Legislative Assembly election. The current members are listed below:

District	No.	Constituency	Name	Party	Remarks
Gyalshing	1	Yoksam–Tashiding (BL)	Tshering Thendup Bhutia	Sikkim Krantikari Morcha	
Gyalshing	2	Yangthang	Bhim Hang Limboo	Sikkim Krantikari Morcha	
Gyalshing	3	Maneybong–Dentam	Sudesh Kumar Subba	Sikkim Krantikari Morcha	
Gyalshing	4	Gyalshing–Barnyak	Lok Nath Sharma	Sikkim Krantikari Morcha	
Soreng	5	Rinchenpong (BL)	Erung Tenzing Lepcha	Sikkim Krantikari Morcha	
Soreng	6	Daramdin (BL)	Mingma Narbu Sherpa	Sikkim Krantikari Morcha	
Soreng	7	Soreng–Chakung	Prem Singh Tamang	Sikkim Krantikari Morcha	Resigned on 14 June 2024
Soreng	7	Soreng–Chakung	Aditya Tamang	Sikkim Krantikari Morcha	Elected unopposed in 2024 by-election
Soreng	8	Salghari–Zoom (SC)	Madan Cintury	Sikkim Krantikari Morcha	
Namchi	9	Barfung (BL)	Rikshal Dorjee Bhutia	Sikkim Krantikari Morcha	
Namchi	10	Poklok–Kamrang	Bhoj Raj Rai	Sikkim Krantikari Morcha	
Namchi	11	Namchi–Singhithang	Krishna Kumari Rai	Sikkim Krantikari Morcha	Resigned on 13 June 2024
Namchi	11	Namchi–Singhithang	Satish Chandra Rai	Sikkim Krantikari Morcha	Elected unopposed in 2024 by-election
Namchi	12	Melli	Nar Bahadur Pradhan	Sikkim Krantikari Morcha	
Namchi	13	Namthang–Rateypani	Sanjit Kharel	Sikkim Krantikari Morcha	
Namchi	14	Temi–Namphing	Bedu Singh Panth	Sikkim Krantikari Morcha	
Namchi	15	Rangang–Yangang	Raj Kumari Thapa	Sikkim Krantikari Morcha	
Namchi	16	Tumin–Lingee (BL)	Samdup Tshering Bhutia	Sikkim Krantikari Morcha	
Gangtok	17	Khamdong–Singtam	Nar Bahadur Dahal	Sikkim Krantikari Morcha	
Pakyong	18	West Pendam (SC)	Lall Bahadur Das	Sikkim Krantikari Morcha	
Pakyong	19	Rhenock	Prem Singh Tamang	Sikkim Krantikari Morcha	Chief Minister
Pakyong	20	Chujachen	Puran Kumar Gurung	Sikkim Krantikari Morcha	
Pakyong	21	Gnathang–Machong (BL)	Pamin Lepcha	Sikkim Krantikari Morcha	
Pakyong	22	Namchaybong	Raju Basnet	Sikkim Krantikari Morcha	
Gangtok	23	Shyari (BL)	Tenzing Norbu Lamtha	Sikkim Krantikari Morcha	Switch from SDF to SKM
Gangtok	24	Martam–Rumtek (BL)	Sonam Venchungpa	Sikkim Krantikari Morcha	
Gangtok	25	Upper Tadong	G.T. Dhungel	Sikkim Krantikari Morcha	
Gangtok	26	Arithang	Arun Kumar Upreti	Sikkim Krantikari Morcha	
Gangtok	27	Gangtok (BL)	Delay Namgyal Barfungpa	Sikkim Krantikari Morcha	
Gangtok	28	Upper Burtuk	Kala Rai	Sikkim Krantikari Morcha	
Mangan	29	Kabi–Lungchok (BL)	Thenlay Tshering Bhutia	Sikkim Krantikari Morcha	
Mangan	30	Djongu (BL)	Pintso Namgyal Lepcha	Sikkim Krantikari Morcha	
Mangan	31	Lachen–Mangan (BL)	Samdup Lepcha	Sikkim Krantikari Morcha	
Buddhist Monasteries	32	Sangha	Sonam Lama	Sikkim Krantikari Morcha	
