= Fifth Chamling ministry =

- Ministry of Sikkim
- Date formed: 27 May 2014
- Date dissolved: 27 May 2019

People and organisations
- Head of state: Governor
- Head of government: Pawan Kumar Chamling
- Total no. of members: 12
- Member parties: Sikkim Democratic Front
- Status in legislature: Majority
- Opposition party: Sikkim Krantikari Morcha (2014-2019)

History
- Election: 2014
- Legislature term: 5 years
- Predecessor: Fourth Chamling ministry
- Successor: Prem Singh Tamang ministry

Pawan Kumar Chamling was elected as Chief Minister of Sikkim for the fifth time in May 2014.

== Chief Minister & Council of Ministers ==
Name	Office	Portfolio	Took office	Left office	Party
Pawan Kumar Chamling	Chief Minister	Home Department; Finance Revenue and Expenditure Department; Development Planning; Economic Reforms and North East Council Affairs Department; Departments not specially allotted to any other Minister	27 May 2014	27 May 2019	SDF
Ram Bahadur Subba	Minister	Human Resource Development; Sports & Youth Affairs; Law & Legislative; Parliamentary Affairs	27 May 2014	27 May 2019	SDF
Dorjee Dazom Bhutia	Minister	Energy & Power; Labour	27 May 2014	27 May 2019	SDF
Ugyen Tshering Gyatso Bhutia	Minister	Tourism & Civil Aviation; Commerce & Industries	27 May 2014	27 May 2019	SDF
Somnath Poudyal	Minister	Food Security; Agriculture Development; Horticulture & Cash Crops Development; Irrigation & Flood Control; Animal Husbandry, Livestock Fisheries and Veterinary Services	27 May 2014	27 May 2019	SDF
Dorjee Tshering Lepcha	Minister	Sikkim Public Works (Buildings & Housing); Transport	27 May 2014	27 May 2019	SDF
Narendra Kumar Subba	Minister	Urban Development; Housing; Food; Civil Supplies and Consumer Affairs	27 May 2014	27 May 2019	SDF
Tulshi Devi Rai	Minister	Water Security; Public Health Engineering; Social Justice, Empowerment & Welfare Departments	27 May 2014	27 May 2019	SDF
Tshering Wangdi Lepcha	Minister	Forest, Environment & Wildlife Management; Mines, Minerals & Geology; Science & Technology	27 May 2014	27 May 2019	SDF
Garjaman Gurung	Minister	Sikkim Public Works (Roads and Bridges); Cultural Affairs & Heritage	27 May 2014	27 May 2019	SDF
Sher Bahadur Subedi	Minister	Rural Management & Development; Panchayati Raj; Cooperation	27 May 2014	27 May 2019	SDF
Arjun Kumar Ghatani	Minister	Healthcare, Human Services & Family Welfare; Information & Public Relation (IPR)	27 May 2014	27 May 2019	SDF
