= Somnath Poudyal =

Indian politician

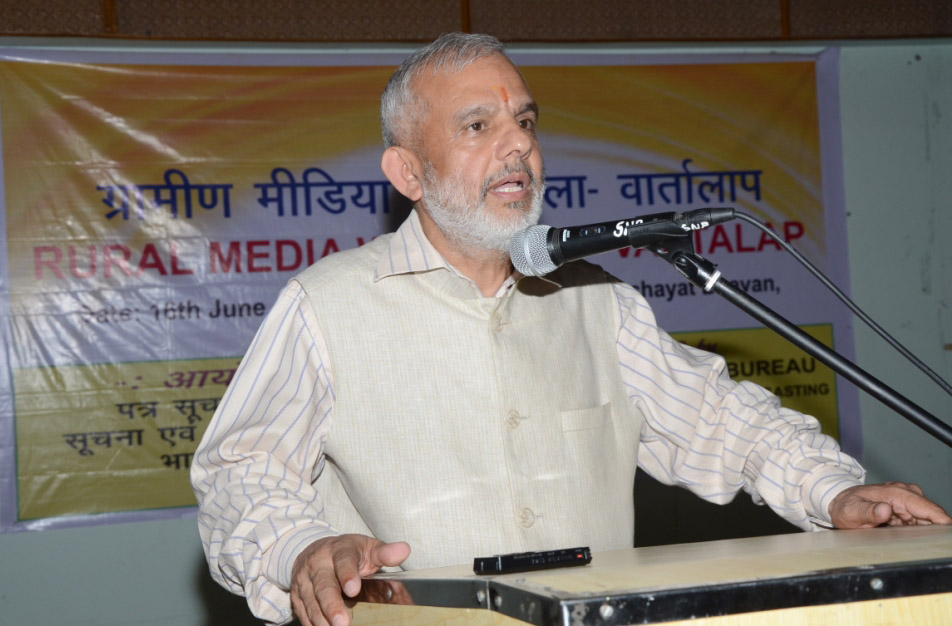
- Rural Media Workshop Vartalaap at Singtam on 2015

Member of Sikkim Legislative Assembly
- In office 2014–2019
- Preceded by: Am Prasad Sharma
- Succeeded by: Mani Kumar Sharma
- Constituency: Khamdong-Singtam

Personal details
- Party: Sikkim Democratic Front

Somnath Poudyal is a Sikkim Democratic Front politician from Sikkim. He was elected in Sikkim Legislative Assembly election in 2014 from Khamdong-Singtam constituency as candidate of Sikkim Democratic Front. He was minister of Food Security, Agriculture Development, Horticulture & Cash Crops Development, Irrigation & Flood Control and Animal Husbandry, Livestock Fisheries and Veterinary Services in Pawan Chamling fifth ministry from 2014 to 2019.
