= Maneybung =

Village in India

Maneybung Maneybong
- Village
- Map of Sikkim, India Maneybung (India)
- Coordinates: 27.2819°N 88.0886°E
- Country: India
- State: Sikkim
- District: Gyalshing
- Gram Panchayat: Maneybung Sopakha

Government
  - Type: State legislative assemblies of India
  - Body: Maneybong–Dentam Assembly constituency

Area
  - Total: 713.9 ha (1,764 acres)
- Elevation: 1,800 m (5,900 ft)

Population (2011)
  - Total: 3,407
  - Density: 477.2/km^{2} (1,236/sq mi)

Languages
  - Official: Nepali, Bhutia, Lepcha, Limbu, Newari, Rai, Gurung, Mangar, Sherpa, Tamang and Sunwar
- Time zone: UTC+5:30 (IST)
- PIN: 737113
- Telephone code: 261029
- Vehicle registration: SK-02

Maneybung, also spelled as Maneybong, is a village in West Sikkim district, Sikkim, India. As per the 2011 Census of India, the Maneybung village has a total population of 3,407 peoples with a literacy rate of 71.18%. The Maneybung village is governed by the Maneybung-dentam assembly constituency and the Sikkim parliamentary constituency.
