= Namchaybong Assembly constituency =

Legislative Assembly constituency in Sikkim, India

Coordinates: 27.258°N 88.599°E

Namchaybong
- Constituency No. 22 for the Sikkim Legislative Assembly

Constituency details
- Country: India
- Region: Northeast India
- State: Sikkim
- District: Pakyong
- Lok Sabha constituency: Sikkim
- Established: 2008
- Total electors: 15,095
- Reservation: None

Member of Legislative Assembly
- 11th Sikkim Legislative Assembly
- Incumbent Raju Basnet
- Party: SKM
- Alliance: NDA
- Elected year: 2024

Namchaybong is one of the 32 Legislative Assembly constituencies of Sikkim, in India. It is part of Pakyong district.

As of 2024, it is represented by Raju Basnet of the Sikkim Krantikari Morcha.

== Members of the Legislative Assembly ==
| Election | Member | Party |
|---|---|---|
| 2009 | Bek Bahadur Rai | Sikkim Democratic Front |
| 2014 | Bek Bahadur Rai | Sikkim Democratic Front |
| 2019 | Em Prasad Sharma | Sikkim Democratic Front |
| 2024 | Raju Basnet | Sikkim Krantikari Morcha |

== Election results ==
=== Assembly Election 2024 ===
2024 Sikkim Legislative Assembly election: Namchaybong
| Party | Candidate | Votes | % | ±% |
|---|---|---|---|---|
| SKM | Raju Basnet | 7,195 | 53.42% | ▲11.73 |
| SDF | Pawan Kumar Chamling | 4,939 | 36.67% | ▼12.85 |
| CAP–Sikkim | Severine Rai | 814 | 6.04% | New |
| BJP | Pooja Sharma | 374 | 2.78% | ▼1.85 |
| NOTA | None of the Above | 147 | 1.09% | ▲0.37 |
| Margin of victory | | 2,256 | 16.75% | ▲8.92 |
| Turnout | | 13,469 | 82.14% | ▼0.00 |
| Registered electors | | 16,397 | | ▲8.63 |
| SKM gain from SDF | | Swing | ▲3.89 | |

=== Assembly election 2019 ===
2019 Sikkim Legislative Assembly election: Namchaybong
| Party | Candidate | Votes | % | ±% |
|---|---|---|---|---|
| SDF | Em Prasad Sharma | 6,141 | 49.52% | ▼1.20 |
| SKM | Denis Rai | 5,170 | 41.69% | ▼3.37 |
| BJP | Devi Basnett | 574 | 4.63% | ▲3.11 |
| SRP | Kharga Bahadur Rai | 162 | 1.31% | New |
| Sikkim Rajya Manch | Phipra Hang Subba | 161 | 1.30% | New |
| HSP | Anush Rai | 102 | 0.82% | New |
| NOTA | None of the Above | 90 | 0.73% | ▼0.70 |
| Margin of victory | | 971 | 7.83% | ▲2.17 |
| Turnout | | 12,400 | 82.15% | ▼3.05 |
| Registered electors | | 15,095 | | ▲16.96 |
| SDF hold | | Swing | ▼1.20 | |

=== Assembly election 2014 ===
2014 Sikkim Legislative Assembly election: Namchaybong
| Party | Candidate | Votes | % | ±% |
|---|---|---|---|---|
| SDF | Bek Bahadur Rai | 5,577 | 50.72% | ▼12.65 |
| SKM | Dilip Rai | 4,955 | 45.07% | New |
| BJP | Tashi Rai | 167 | 1.52% | New |
| NOTA | None of the Above | 157 | 1.43% | New |
| INC | Manoj Rai | 139 | 1.26% | ▼30.59 |
| Margin of victory | | 622 | 5.66% | ▼25.86 |
| Turnout | | 10,995 | 85.19% | ▼1.29 |
| Registered electors | | 12,906 | | ▲20.36 |
| SDF hold | | Swing | ▼12.65 | |

=== Assembly election 2009 ===
2009 Sikkim Legislative Assembly election: Namchaybong
| Party | Candidate | Votes | % | ±% |
|---|---|---|---|---|
| SDF | Bek Bahadur Rai | 5,877 | 63.37% | New |
| INC | Em Prasad Sharma | 2,954 | 31.85% | New |
| NCP | Ashok Kumar Subba | 132 | 1.42% | New |
| SHRP | Ten Tshera Subba | 101 | 1.09% | New |
| Independent | Diwash Thapa | 96 | 1.04% | New |
| Sikkim Gorkha Party | Sunder Rai | 73 | 0.79% | New |
| Margin of victory | | 2,923 | 31.52% | |
| Turnout | | 9,274 | 86.49% | |
| Registered electors | | 10,723 | | |
| SDF win (new seat) | | | | |

== See also ==
- List of constituencies of the Sikkim Legislative Assembly
- Pakyong district
