= Ramgarh, Rajasthan Assembly constituency =

Legislative Assembly constituency in Rajasthan State, India

Coordinates: 27.59°N 76.81°E

Ramgarh
- Constituency No. 67 for the Rajasthan Legislative Assembly

Constituency details
- Country: India
- Region: North India
- State: Rajasthan
- Division: Jaipur
- District: Alwar
- Lok Sabha constituency: Alwar
- Established: 1951
- Total electors: 271,744
- Reservation: None

Member of Legislative Assembly
- 16th Rajasthan Legislative Assembly
- Incumbent Sukhavant Singh
- Party: BJP
- Elected year: 2024

Ramgarh Assembly constituency is one of the 200 Legislative Assembly constituencies of Rajasthan state in India.

It is in Alwar district and is a segment of Alwar Lok Sabha constituency.

== Members of the Legislative Assembly ==
Year	Member	Party
1952	Durlabh Singh	Indian National Congress
1957	Ganga Devi	Indian National Congress
1962	Uma Mathur	Indian National Congress
1967	Shobha Ram Kumawat	Indian National Congress
1972	Shobha Ram Kumawat	Indian National Congress
1977	Jai Krishan	Indian National Congress
1980	Jai Krishan	Indian National Congress
1985	Raghuwar Dayal	Bharatiya Janata Party
1990	Zubair Khan	Indian National Congress
1993	Zubair Khan	Indian National Congress
1998	Gyan Dev Ahuja	Bharatiya Janata Party
2003	Zubair Khan	Indian National Congress
2008	Gyan Dev Ahuja	Bharatiya Janata Party
2013	Gyan Dev Ahuja	Bharatiya Janata Party
2018	Shafia Zubair	Indian National Congress
2023	Zubair Khan	Indian National Congress
2024 (by)	Sukhavant Singh	Bharatiya Janata Party

== Election results ==
=== 2024 bypoll ===
Rajasthan Legislative Assembly by-election, 2024: Ramgarh
Party	Candidate	Votes	%	±%
BJP	Sukhavant Singh	108,811	52.59	
INC	Aryan Zubair	95,175	46.00	
NOTA	None of the Above	798	0.39	
Majority		13,636	6.59	
Turnout				
BJP gain from INC		Swing		

=== 2023 ===
2023 Rajasthan Legislative Assembly election: Ramgarh
Party	Candidate	Votes	%	±%
INC	Zubair Khan	93,765	44.4	−0.41
ASP(KR)	Sukhavant Singh	74,069	35.08	
BJP	Jay Ahuja	34,882	16.52	−21.71
NOTA	None of the above	695	0.33	+0.2
Majority		19,696	9.32	+2.74
Turnout		211,159	77.71	−1.2
INC hold		Swing		

=== 2018 ===
Rajasthan Legislative Assembly Election, 2018: Ramgarh
Party	Candidate	Votes	%	±%
INC	Shafia Zubair	83,311	44.81	
BJP	Sukhavant Singh	71,083	38.23	
BSP	Ku. Jagat Singh	24,856	13.37	
NOTA	None of the above	241	0.13	
Majority		12,228	6.58	
Turnout		185,941	78.91	
INC gain from BJP		Swing		

=== 2013 ===
- Gyan Dev Ahuja (BJP): 73,842 votes
- Zubair Khan (INC): 69,195

=== 1951 ===
- Durlabh Singh (INC): 18,434 votes
- Phool Chand (CPI): 4,371

== See also ==
- List of constituencies of the Rajasthan Legislative Assembly
- Alwar district
- Ramgarh, Dantaramgarh
