= Manglaur Assembly constituency =

Constituency of the Uttarakhand legislative assembly in India

Coordinates: 29.79°N 77.88°E

Manglaur
- Constituency No. 33 for the Uttarakhand Legislative Assembly

Constituency details
- Country: India
- Region: North India
- State: Uttarakhand
- District: Haridwar
- Lok Sabha constituency: Haridwar
- Reservation: None

Member of Legislative Assembly
- 5th Uttarakhand Legislative Assembly
- Incumbent Muhammad Nizamuddin
- Party: Indian National Congress
- Elected year: 2024

Manglaur is one of the seventy electoral Uttarakhand Legislative Assembly constituencies of Uttarakhand state in India. It includes Manglaur area of Haridwar District.

Manglaur Legislative Assembly constituency is a part of Haridwar (Lok Sabha constituency).

== Members of the Legislative Assembly ==
Election	Member	Party
2002	Muhammad Nizamuddin	Bahujan Samaj Party
2007	Muhammad Nizamuddin	Bahujan Samaj Party
Major boundary changes
2012	Sarwat Karim Ansari	Bahujan Samaj Party
2017	Muhammad Nizamuddin	Indian National Congress
2022	Sarwat Karim Ansari	Bahujan Samaj Party
2024^	Muhammad Nizamuddin	Indian National Congress

- ^ denotes by-election

== Election results ==
=== 2027 Assembly election ===
2027 Uttarakhand Legislative Assembly election: Manglaur
Party	Candidate	Votes	%	±%
INC				
BJP				
BSP				
NOTA	None of the above			
Majority				
Turnout				
gain from		Swing		

=== 2024 by-election ===
Uttarakhand Legislative Assembly by-election, 2024: Manglaur
Party	Candidate	Votes	%	±%
INC	Qazi Muhammad Nizamuddin	31,727	37.91	▲1.41
BJP	Kartar Singh Bhadana	31,305	37.4	▲16.04
BSP	Obedur Rehman	19,559	23.37	▼13.81
NOTA	None of the Above	237	0.28	▼0.02
Majority		422	0.5	▼0.18
Turnout		83,699	69.73	▼5.85
INC gain from BSP		Swing		

=== Assembly Election 2022 ===
2022 Uttarakhand Legislative Assembly election: Manglaur
Party	Candidate	Votes	%	±%
BSP	Sarwat Karim Ansari	32,660	37.18%	▲1.88
INC	Qazi Muhammad Nizamuddin	32,062	36.50%	▼2.08
BJP	Dinesh Singh Pawar	18,763	21.36%	▲0.49
AAP	Navneet Kumar (Guddu Bhaiya)	2,554	2.91%	New
ASP(KR)	Qazi Mohd Monis	782	0.89%	New
NOTA	None of the above	265	0.30%	▼0.04
Margin of victory		598	0.68%	▼2.60
Turnout		87,845	75.58%	▼2.71
Registered electors		1,16,225		▲11.97
BSP gain from INC		Swing	▼1.40	

=== Assembly Election 2017 ===
2017 Uttarakhand Legislative Assembly election: Manglaur
Party	Candidate	Votes	%	±%
INC	Qazi Muhammad Nizamuddin	31,352	38.58%	▲5.51
BSP	Sarwat Karim Ansari	28,684	35.29%	▲1.26
BJP	Rishipal Baliyan	16,964	20.87%	▲18.03
RLD	Latesh Kumar	3,265	4.02%	▼22.64
NOTA	None of the above	278	0.34%	New
Margin of victory		2,668	3.28%	▲2.32
Turnout		81,271	78.29%	▼0.82
Registered electors		1,03,802		▲13.11
INC gain from BSP		Swing	▲4.55	

=== Assembly Election 2012 ===
2012 Uttarakhand Legislative Assembly election: Manglaur
Party	Candidate	Votes	%	±%
BSP	Sarwat Karim Ansari	24,706	34.03%	▼2.88
INC	Qazi Muhammad Nizamuddin	24,008	33.07%	▲6.17
RLD	Gaurav Chaudhary	19,354	26.66%	▼5.35
BJP	Kaleem	2,061	2.84%	▲0.96
Independent	Sanjeev Tomar	732	1.01%	New
Maidani Kranti Dal	Naresh Kumar	545	0.75%	New
SP	Anuj	447	0.62%	▲0.10
Margin of victory		698	0.96%	▼3.94
Turnout		72,602	79.11%	▲8.89
Registered electors		91,769		
BSP hold		Swing	▼2.88	

=== Assembly Election 2007 ===
2007 Uttarakhand Legislative Assembly election: Manglaur
Party	Candidate	Votes	%	±%
BSP	Qazi Muhammad Nizamuddin	25,559	36.91%	▼3.03
RLD	Chaudhry Kulveer Singh	22,166	32.01%	▲26.67
INC	Sarwat Karim Ansari	18,629	26.90%	▼0.59
BJP	Hawaldar Harpal Singh	1,302	1.88%	▼13.79
Independent	Brij Bhushan	373	0.54%	New
BJSH	Manoj Kumar Tomar	357	0.52%	New
SP	Surendra Pal Singh	355	0.51%	▼2.26
Independent	Usha Rani	355	0.51%	New
Margin of victory		3,393	4.90%	▼7.55
Turnout		69,252	70.23%	▲4.38
Registered electors		98,615		
BSP hold		Swing	▼3.03	

=== Assembly Election 2002 ===
2002 Uttaranchal Legislative Assembly election: Manglaur
Party	Candidate	Votes	%	±%
BSP	Qazi Muhammad Nizamuddin	21,155	39.94%	New
INC	Sarwat Karim Ansari	14,561	27.49%	New
BJP	Nagendra Kumar	8,298	15.67%	New
RLD	Naresh Kumar	2,826	5.34%	New
Shivsena	Avinash Kumar	1,622	3.06%	New
SP	Gayur	1,467	2.77%	New
INLD	Sompal Singh	1,094	2.07%	New
Independent	Sompal	627	1.18%	New
RPD	Rajpal	560	1.06%	New
UKD	Vinod	449	0.85%	New
Margin of victory		6,594	12.45%	
Turnout		52,970	65.84%	
Registered electors		80,452		
BSP win (new seat)				

== See also ==
- Haridwar (Lok Sabha constituency)
