= Shafia Zubair =

Indian politician

Member of theRajasthan Legislative Assembly
- In office 2019–2023
- Preceded by: Gyan Dev Ahuja
- Succeeded by: Zubair Khan
- Constituency: Ramgarh

Personal details
- Born: 19 September 1967 (age 58) Secunderabad, Telangana
- Party: Indian National Congress
- Spouse: Zubair Khan
- Children: 2
- Occupation: Businesswoman, farmer
- Website: rajassembly.nic.in/MembersPage.asp?DivNo=200

Shafia Zubair is an Indian politician from Rajasthan and a member of the Indian National Congress. She was elected as a member of the Legislative Assembly of Rajasthan from Ramgarh, Alwar on 31 January 2019. She defeated her nearest rival from BJP by a margin of 12,221 votes. She was the wife of All India Congress Committee Secretary Zubair Khan. Shafia Zubair was previously the Zila Pramukh of Alwar (2010-2015) from Indian National Congress.
