= Temi–Tarku Assembly constituency =

Constituency of the Sikkim legislative assembly in India

Temi–Tarku
- Former constituency for the Sikkim Legislative Assembly

Constituency details
- Country: India
- Region: Northeast India
- State: Sikkim
- Established: 1979
- Abolished: 2008
- Total electors: 10,680

Temi–Tarku Assembly constituency was an assembly constituency in the Indian state of Sikkim.

== Members of the Legislative Assembly ==
Election	Member	Party
1979	Nar Bahadur Khatiwada	Sikkim Prajatantra Congress
1985	Indra Bahadur Rai	Sikkim Sangram Parishad
1989	I. B. Rai	Sikkim Sangram Parishad
1994	Garjaman Gurung	Sikkim Democratic Front
1999	Garjaman Gurung	Sikkim Democratic Front
2004	Garjaman Gurung	Sikkim Democratic Front

== Election results ==
=== Assembly election 2004 ===
2004 Sikkim Legislative Assembly election: Temi–Tarku
Party	Candidate	Votes	%	±%
SDF	Garjaman Gurung	6,403	75.62%	▲16.92
INC	Laxmi Prasad Tiwari	1,947	23.00%	New
Independent	Man Bahadur Rai	117	1.38%	New
Margin of victory		4,456	52.63%	▲34.93
Turnout		8,467	79.28%	▼2.40
Registered electors		10,680		▲16.49
SDF hold		Swing	▲16.92	

=== Assembly election 1999 ===
1999 Sikkim Legislative Assembly election: Temi–Tarku
Party	Candidate	Votes	%	±%
SDF	Garjaman Gurung	4,396	58.71%	▲1.51
SSP	Dil Kri. Bhandari	3,071	41.01%	▲3.47
Margin of victory		1,325	17.69%	▼1.97
Turnout		7,488	83.02%	▲6.19
Registered electors		9,168		▲20.95
SDF hold		Swing	▲1.51	

=== Assembly election 1994 ===
1994 Sikkim Legislative Assembly election: Temi–Tarku
Party	Candidate	Votes	%	±%
SDF	Garjaman Gurung	3,273	57.20%	New
SSP	Indra Bahadur Rai	2,148	37.54%	▼37.56
INC	Nar Bahadur Khatiwada	256	4.47%	▲0.03
Independent	Kishor Kumar	34	0.59%	New
Margin of victory		1,125	19.66%	▼38.26
Turnout		5,722	77.26%	▲9.78
Registered electors		7,580		
SDF gain from SSP		Swing	▼17.90	

=== Assembly election 1989 ===
1989 Sikkim Legislative Assembly election: Temi–Tarku
Party	Candidate	Votes	%	±%
SSP	I. B. Rai	3,091	75.10%	▲5.27
Independent	Badrinath Pradhan	707	17.18%	New
INC	Nar Bahadur Khatiwara	183	4.45%	▼6.29
RIS	Ram Prasad Dhakal	135	3.28%	New
Margin of victory		2,384	57.92%	▼1.17
Turnout		4,116	68.93%	▲1.66
Registered electors		6,264		
SSP hold		Swing	▲5.27	

=== Assembly election 1985 ===
1985 Sikkim Legislative Assembly election: Temi–Tarku
Party	Candidate	Votes	%	±%
SSP	Indra Bahadur Rai	2,048	69.83%	New
INC	D. B. Basnet	315	10.74%	▲9.26
SPC	Nar Bahadur Khatiwara	232	7.91%	▼29.76
Independent	Bishnu Kumar Rai	128	4.36%	New
Independent	Diki Lhamu	97	3.31%	New
Independent	Garjaman Gurung	69	2.35%	New
JP	Man Bahadur Tiwari	22	0.75%	▼7.06
Independent	Gopal Dass Chettri	22	0.75%	New
Margin of victory		1,733	59.09%	▲43.91
Turnout		2,933	65.93%	▼0.46
Registered electors		4,579		▲46.01
SSP gain from SPC		Swing	▲32.16	

=== Assembly election 1979 ===
1979 Sikkim Legislative Assembly election: Temi–Tarku
Party	Candidate	Votes	%	±%
SPC	Nar Bahadur Khatiwada	762	37.67%	New
SJP	Harikrishna Sharma	455	22.49%	New
SC (R)	Adhikalal Pradhan	267	13.20%	New
JP	Padrinath Pradhan	158	7.81%	New
Independent	Durga Lama Pradhan	156	7.71%	New
Independent	Rapden Bhutia	80	3.95%	New
Independent	Gopal Rai	78	3.86%	New
Independent	Shepehung	37	1.83%	New
INC	Indra Bahadur Chhetri	30	1.48%	New
Margin of victory		307	15.18%	
Turnout		2,023	67.54%	
Registered electors		3,136		
SPC win (new seat)				
