= Manavadar Assembly constituency =

Legislative Assembly constituency in Gujarat State, India

Coordinates: 21.5°N 70.14°E

Manavadar
- Constituency No. 85 for the Gujarat Legislative Assembly

Constituency details
- Country: India
- Region: Western India
- State: Gujarat
- District: Junagadh
- Lok Sabha constituency: Porbandar
- Established: 2007
- Total electors: 248,763
- Reservation: None

Member of Legislative Assembly
- 15th Gujarat Legislative Assembly
- Incumbent Arvindbhai Ladani
- Party: Bharatiya Janata Party
- Elected year: 2024 Bye Election

Manavadar is one of the 182 Legislative Assembly constituencies of Gujarat state in India. It is part of Junagadh district.

== List of segments ==
1. Manavadar Taluka
2. Vanthali Taluka
3. Mendarda Taluka – Entire taluka except village – Lakadveri Nes

== Members of Vidhan Sabha ==
| Year | Member | Party |
|---|---|---|
| 1962 | Manharlala Amrabhai Chavda | Indian National Congress |
| 1967 | Manharlala Amrabhai Chavda | Indian National Congress |
| 1972 | Devjibhai Bhikhabhai Vanavi | Indian National Congress |
| 1975 | Patel Vallabhbhai Popatbhai | Kisan Mazdoor Lok Paksha |
| 1980 | Muljibhai Kalidas Hudka | Indian National Congress (I) |
| 1985 | Jashumati Arjunbhai Patel | Indian National Congress |
| 1990 | Jawaharbhai Pethaljibhai Chavda | Indian National Congress |
| 1995 | Ratilal Gordhanbhai Sureja | Bharatiya Janata Party |
| 1998 | Ratilal Gordhanbhai Sureja | Bharatiya Janata Party |
| 2002 | Ratilal Gordhanbhai Sureja | Bharatiya Janata Party |
| 2007 | Jawaharbhai Pethaljibhai Chavda | Indian National Congress |
| 2012 | Jawaharbhai Pethaljibhai Chavda | Indian National Congress |
| 2017 | Jawaharbhai Pethaljibhai Chavda | Indian National Congress |
| 2019^ | Jawaharbhai Pethaljibhai Chavda | Bharatiya Janata Party |
| 2022 | Arvindbhai Ladani | Indian National Congress |
| 2024^ | Arvindbhai Ladani | Bharatiya Janata Party |

- ^ denotes by-election

== Election results ==
=== 2024 by-election ===
Gujarat Legislative Assembly by-election, 2024: Manavadar
| Party | Candidate | Votes | % | ±% |
|---|---|---|---|---|
| BJP | Arvindbhai Ladani | 82,017 | 60.03 | ▲20.14 |
| INC | Haribhai Govindbhai Kansagara | 51,001 | 37.33 | ▼4.81 |
| NOTA | None of the Above | 1,950 | 1.43 | ▲0.41 |
| Independent | Mahesh Ramjibhai Parmar | 1,073 | 0.79 | ▲0.56 |
| Majority | | 31,016 | 6.47 | ▲4.22 |
| Turnout | | 1,36,636 | | |
| BJP gain from INC | | Swing | | |

=== 2022 ===
Gujarat Assembly election, 2022:Manavadar Assembly constituency
| Party | Candidate | Votes | % | ±% |
|---|---|---|---|---|
| INC | Arvindbhai Ladani | 64,690 | 42.14 | |
| BJP | Jawaharbhai Chavda | 61,237 | 39.89 | |
| AAP | Karshanbapu Bhadarka | 23,297 | 15.18 | New |
| NOTA | None of the above | 1,568 | 1.02 | |
| Majority | | 3,453 | 2.25 | |
| Turnout | | 1,53,497 | | |
| Registered electors | | 246,452 | | |
| INC gain from BJP | | Swing | | |

=== 2019 By-poll ===
By-election, 2019: Manavadar
| Party | Candidate | Votes | % | ±% |
|---|---|---|---|---|
| BJP | Jawaharbhai Chavda | 78,491 | 52.01 | +13.90 |
| INC | Arvindbhai Ladani | 68,732 | 45.54 | −11.85 |
| NCP | Kaneriya Reshma Patel | 1,709 | 1.13 | New |
| Majority | | 9,759 | 6.47 | |
| Turnout | | 1,52,256 | 63.38 | |
| BJP gain from INC | | Swing | | |

=== 2017 ===
Gujarat Legislative Assembly Election, 2017: Manavadar
| Party | Candidate | Votes | % | ±% |
|---|---|---|---|---|
| INC | Jawaharbhai Chavda | 88,570 | 57.39 | |
| BJP | Nitinkumar Fadadu (Tinubhai) | 58,807 | 38.11 | |
| Majority | | | 19.28 | |
| Turnout | | 1,54,322 | 65.72 | |
| INC hold | | Swing | | |

=== 2012 ===
2012 Gujarat Legislative Assembly election: Manavadar
| Party | Candidate | Votes | % | ±% |
|---|---|---|---|---|
| INC | Jawaharbhai Chavda | 72,879 | 45.80% | |
| BJP | Ratibhai Sureja | 68,477 | 43.03% | |
| Majority | | 4,402 | 2.77% | |
| Turnout | | 1,59,135 | 73.12% | |
| INC hold | | Swing | | |

== See also ==
- List of constituencies of Gujarat Legislative Assembly
- Gujarat Legislative Assembly
