= Arjun Kumar Ghatani =

Indian politician

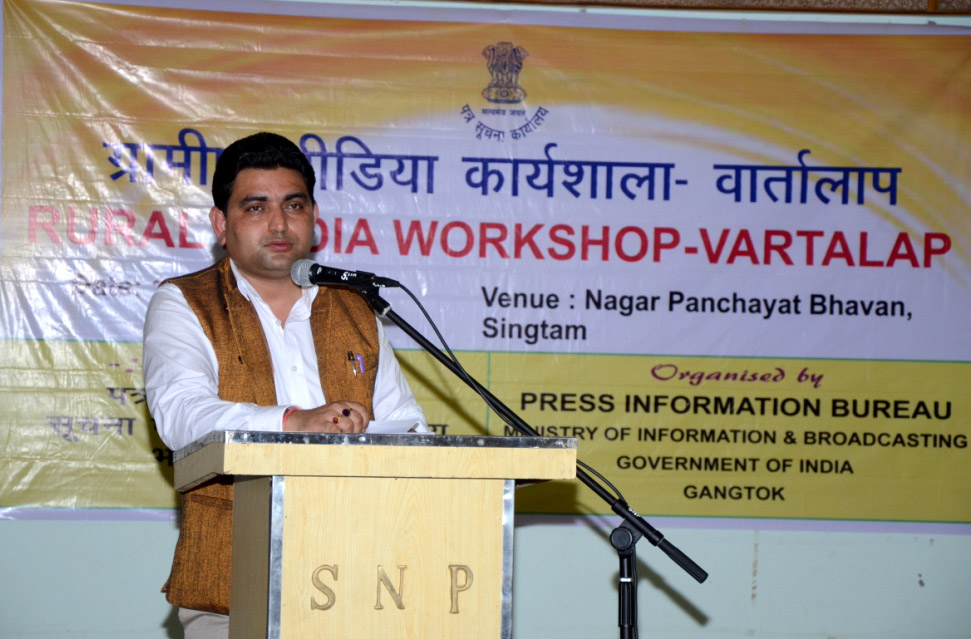
- A.K. Ghatani in 2015

Member of Sikkim Legislative Assembly
- In office 2014–2019
- Preceded by: Madan Cintury
- Succeeded by: Sunita Gajmer
- Constituency: Salghari-Zoom

Personal details
- Party: Sikkim Democratic Front

Arjun Kumar Ghatani is a Sikkim Democratic Front politician from Sikkim, India. He was elected in Sikkim Legislative Assembly election 2014 from Salghari-Zoom constituency as candidate of the front. He was minister of Healthcare, Human Services & Family Welfare and Information & Public Relation (IPR) in Pawan Chamling fifth ministry from 2014 to 2019.
