= Salghari–Zoom Assembly constituency =

Constituency of the Sikkim legislative assembly in India

Coordinates: 27.132°N 88.284°E

Salghari-Zoom
- Constituency No. 8 for the Sikkim Legislative Assembly

Constituency details
- Country: India
- Region: Northeast India
- State: Sikkim
- District: Soreng
- Lok Sabha constituency: Sikkim
- Established: 2008
- Total electors: 10,942
- Reservation: SC

Member of Legislative Assembly
- 11th Sikkim Legislative Assembly
- Incumbent Madan Cintury
- Party: SKM
- Alliance: NDA
- Elected year: 2024

Salghari–Zoom Assembly constituency is one of the 32 assembly constituencies of Sikkim a north east state of India. Salghari-Zoom is part of Sikkim Lok Sabha constituency.

== Members of the Legislative Assembly ==
Election	Member	Party
2009	Madan Cintury	Sikkim Democratic Front
2014	Arjun Kumar Ghatani	Sikkim Democratic Front
2019	Sunita Gajmer	Sikkim Krantikari Morcha
2024	Madan Cintury	Sikkim Krantikari Morcha

== Election results ==
=== Assembly Election 2024 ===
2024 Sikkim Legislative Assembly election: Salghari–Zoom
Party	Candidate	Votes	%	±%
SKM	Madan Cintury	5,678	58.69%	▲9.43
SDF	Janga Bir Darnal	2,966	30.66%	▼17.57
BJP	Pahal Man Kami	555	5.74%	New
CAP–Sikkim	Kaushal Lohagan	400	4.13%	New
NOTA	None of the Above	75	0.78%	▼0.02
Margin of victory		2,712	28.03%	▲26.99
Turnout		9,674	82.73%	▲1.10
Registered electors		11,694		▲6.87
SKM hold		Swing	▲9.43	

=== Assembly election 2019 ===
2019 Sikkim Legislative Assembly election: Salghari–Zoom
Party	Candidate	Votes	%	±%
SKM	Sunita Gajmer	4,400	49.27%	▲6.29
SDF	Dhan Kumari Kami	4,307	48.23%	▼4.40
INC	Ganga Maya Cintury	119	1.33%	▲0.54
NOTA	None of the Above	71	0.79%	▼0.80
Margin of victory		93	1.04%	▼8.60
Turnout		8,931	81.62%	▼2.08
Registered electors		10,942		▲13.40
SKM gain from SDF		Swing	▼3.36	

=== Assembly election 2014 ===
2014 Sikkim Legislative Assembly election: Salghari–Zoom
Party	Candidate	Votes	%	±%
SDF	Arjun Kumar Ghatani	4,250	52.63%	▼12.51
SKM	Bhanu Pratap Rasaily	3,471	42.98%	New
BJP	Ranjit Kami	162	2.01%	New
NOTA	None of the Above	129	1.60%	New
INC	Kharka Bahadur Thatal	64	0.79%	▼30.61
Margin of victory		779	9.65%	▼24.09
Turnout		8,076	83.70%	▼0.92
Registered electors		9,649		▲19.86
SDF hold		Swing	▼12.51	

=== Assembly election 2009 ===
2009 Sikkim Legislative Assembly election: Salghari–Zoom
Party	Candidate	Votes	%	±%
SDF	Madan Cintury	4,437	65.14%	New
INC	Janga Bir Darnal	2,139	31.40%	New
Sikkim Jan-Ekta Party	Nirmala Kami	104	1.53%	New
NCP	Padam Bahadur Darnal	57	0.84%	New
SHRP	Giri Kumar Pariyar	41	0.60%	New
Margin of victory		2,298	33.73%	
Turnout		6,812	84.62%	
Registered electors		8,050		
SDF win (new seat)				

== See also ==
- Salghari
- West Sikkim district
- List of constituencies of Sikkim Legislative Assembly
