= Samdup Tshering Bhutia =

Indian politician

Member of Sikkim Legislative Assembly
- Incumbent
- Assumed office 1 June 2024
- Preceded by: Ugyen Tshering Gyatso Bhutia
- Constituency: Tumin Lingee

Personal details
- Political party: Sikkim Krantikari Morcha

Samdup Tshering Bhutia is an Indian politician from Sikkim belonging from the Sikkim Krantikari Morcha. He is a member of the Legislative Assembly in the 11th Sikkim Legislative Assembly. He won over SDF's Norzong Lepcha with 8265 votes.
