= Namchi–Singhithang Assembly constituency =

Constituency of the Sikkim legislative assembly in India

Coordinates: 27.18°N 88.37°E

Namchi-Singhithang
- Constituency No. 11 for the Sikkim Legislative Assembly

Constituency details
- Country: India
- Region: Northeast India
- State: Sikkim
- District: Namchi
- Lok Sabha constituency: Sikkim
- Established: 2008
- Total electors: 12,689
- Reservation: None

Member of Legislative Assembly
- 11th Sikkim Legislative Assembly
- Incumbent Satish Chandra Rai
- Party: SKM
- Alliance: NDA
- Elected year: 2024

Namchi-Singhithang is one of the 32 constituencies of Sikkim Legislative Assembly, in Sikkim, India. The current incumbent is Satish Chandra Rai of the Sikkim Krantikari Morcha who has been representing the constituency since the 2024 Sikkim Legislative Assembly election.

== Members of the Legislative Assembly ==
Election	Member	Party
2009	Pawan Kumar Chamling	Sikkim Democratic Front
2009^	Binod Kumar Rai	Sikkim Democratic Front
2014	Pawan Kumar Chamling	Sikkim Democratic Front
2019	Pawan Kumar Chamling	Sikkim Democratic Front
2024	Krishna Kumari Rai	Sikkim Krantikari Morcha
2024^	Satish Chandra Rai	Sikkim Krantikari Morcha

^By-election

== Election results ==
=== Assembly By-election 2024 ===
2024 Sikkim Legislative Assembly election: Namchi–Singhithang
Party	Candidate	Votes	%	±%
SKM	Satish Chandra Rai	Unopposed		
SKM hold		Swing		

=== Assembly Election 2024 ===
2024 Sikkim Legislative Assembly election: Namchi–Singhithang
Party	Candidate	Votes	%	±%
SKM	Krishna Kumari Rai	7,907	71.60%	▲25.05
SDF	Bimal Rai	2,605	23.59%	▼26.72
CAP–Sikkim	Mahesh Rai	236	2.14%	New
BJP	Aruna Manger	233	2.11%	New
NOTA	None of the Above	62	0.56%	▼0.19
Margin of victory		5,302	48.01%	▲44.26
Turnout		11,043	83.34%	▲4.17
Registered electors		13,251		▲4.43
SKM gain from SDF		Swing	▲21.29	

=== Assembly election 2019 ===
2019 Sikkim Legislative Assembly election: Namchi–Singhithang
Party	Candidate	Votes	%	±%
SDF	Pawan Kumar Chamling	5,054	50.31%	▼4.77
SKM	Ganesh Rai	4,677	46.56%	▲3.99
INC	Kamala Rai	87	0.87%	▼0.20
SRP	Kharga Bahadur Rai	83	0.83%	New
NOTA	None of the Above	75	0.75%	▼0.55
HSP	Hukum Chandra Rai	70	0.70%	New
Margin of victory		377	3.75%	▼8.75
Turnout		10,046	79.17%	▼0.70
Registered electors		12,689		▲16.93
SDF hold		Swing	▼4.77	

=== Assembly election 2014 ===
2014 Sikkim Legislative Assembly election: Namchi–Singhithang
Party	Candidate	Votes	%	±%
SDF	Pawan Kumar Chamling	4,774	55.08%	▼25.69
SKM	Milan Rai	3,690	42.57%	New
NOTA	None of the Above	112	1.29%	New
INC	Khush Bahadur Rai	92	1.06%	▼8.60
Margin of victory		1,084	12.51%	▼58.60
Turnout		8,668	79.87%	▲12.55
Registered electors		10,852		▲19.70
SDF hold		Swing	▼25.69	

=== Assembly by-election 2009 ===
2009 Sikkim Legislative Assembly by-election: Namchi–Singhithang
Party	Candidate	Votes	%	±%
SDF	Binod Kumar Rai	4,930	80.77%	▼0.20
INC	Youa Raj Rai	590	9.67%	▼4.79
Independent	N. Dorgee Bhutia	516	8.45%	New
Sikkim Gorkha Party	Arjun Kumar Rai	48	0.79%	▲0.07
Margin of victory		4,340	71.10%	▲4.59
Turnout		6,104	67.33%	▼9.52
Registered electors		9,066		
SDF hold		Swing	▼0.20	

=== Assembly election 2009 ===
2009 Sikkim Legislative Assembly election: Namchi–Singhithang
Party	Candidate	Votes	%	±%
SDF	Pawan Kumar Chamling	5,653	80.97%	New
INC	Khush Bahadur Rai	1,009	14.45%	New
Sikkim Jan-Ekta Party	Basant Kumar Rai	127	1.82%	New
NCP	Anjana Tamang	81	1.16%	New
Independent	Sheela Rai	62	0.89%	New
Sikkim Gorkha Party	Arjun Kumar Rai	50	0.72%	New
Margin of victory		4,644	66.51%	
Turnout		6,982	76.84%	
Registered electors		9,086		
SDF win (new seat)				

== See also ==
- Namchi
- Namchi district
- List of constituencies of Sikkim Legislative Assembly
