= Gambegre Assembly constituency =

Legislative Assembly constituency in Meghalaya State, India

Coordinates: 25.44°N 90.2°E

Gamberge
- Constituency No. 56 for the Meghalaya Legislative Assembly

Constituency details
- Country: India
- Region: Northeast India
- State: Meghalaya
- District: West Garo Hills
- Lok Sabha constituency: Tura
- Established: 2008
- Total electors: 31,439
- Reservation: ST

Member of Legislative Assembly
- 11th Meghalaya Legislative Assembly
- Incumbent Mehtab Chandee Agitok Sangma
- Party: NPP
- Alliance: NDA
- Elected year: 2024 by-election

Gambegre Legislative Assembly constituency is one of the 60 Legislative Assembly constituencies of Meghalaya state in India.

It is part of West Garo Hills district and is reserved for candidates belonging to the Scheduled Tribes.

== Members of the Legislative Assembly ==
| Year | Member | Party |
|---|---|---|
| 2013 | Saleng A. Sangma | Independent politician |
| 2018 | Saleng A. Sangma | Nationalist Congress Party |
| 2023 | Saleng A. Sangma | Indian National Congress |
| 2024 By-election | Mehtab Sangma | National People's Party |

== Election results ==
=== Assembly By-election 2024 ===
2024 Meghalaya Legislative Assembly by-election: Gambegre
| Party | Candidate | Votes | % | ±% |
|---|---|---|---|---|
| NPP | Mehtab Sangma | 12,678 | 42.10% | ▲15.15 |
| AITC | Sadhiarani M. Sangma | 8,084 | 26.84% | ▼2.77 |
| INC | Jingjang M. Marak | 7,695 | 25.55% | ▼14.20 |
| BJP | Bernard N. Marak | 710 | 2.36% | ▲1.24 |
| Independent | Jerry A. Sangma | 706 | 2.34% | New |
| NOTA | None of the Above | 95 | 0.32% | ▼0.15 |
| Margin of victory | | 4,594 | 15.25% | ▲5.11 |
| Turnout | | 30,115 | 90.84% | ▲0.40 |
| Registered electors | | 33,091 | | ▲15.23 |
| NPP gain from INC | | Swing | ▲2.34 | |

=== Assembly Election 2023 ===
2023 Meghalaya Legislative Assembly election: Gambegre
| Party | Candidate | Votes | % | ±% |
|---|---|---|---|---|
| INC | Saleng A. Sangma | 11,252 | 39.76% | ▲9.85 |
| AITC | Sadhiarani M. Sangma | 8,381 | 29.61% | ▲28.31 |
| NPP | Rakesh Sangma | 7,628 | 26.95% | ▲13.85 |
| RPI(A) | Jhim Carter M. Sangma | 367 | 1.30% | New |
| BJP | Daniel M Sangma | 315 | 1.11% | New |
| GNC | Sairill D. Marak | 198 | 0.70% | ▼11.38 |
| NOTA | None of the Above | 131 | 0.46% | ▼0.72 |
| Margin of victory | | 2,871 | 10.14% | ▲9.58 |
| Turnout | | 28,302 | 90.44% | ▼1.91 |
| Registered electors | | 31,439 | | ▲20.80 |
| INC gain from NCP | | Swing | ▲9.28 | |

=== Assembly Election 2018 ===
2018 Meghalaya Legislative Assembly election: Gambegre
| Party | Candidate | Votes | % | ±% |
|---|---|---|---|---|
| NCP | Saleng A. Sangma | 7,291 | 30.47% | New |
| INC | Sadhiarani M. Sangma | 7,155 | 29.91% | ▲10.51 |
| NPP | Phillipole D. Marak | 3,134 | 13.10% | ▲7.31 |
| GNC | Jinberth R. Marak | 2,891 | 12.08% | ▲5.72 |
| Independent | Nehru D. Sangma | 2,727 | 11.40% | New |
| AITC | Nengrin Sangma | 311 | 1.30% | New |
| NOTA | None of the Above | 282 | 1.18% | New |
| Margin of victory | | 136 | 0.57% | ▼17.06 |
| Turnout | | 23,925 | 91.93% | ▲0.49 |
| Registered electors | | 26,026 | | ▲21.36 |
| NCP gain from Independent | | Swing | ▼6.55 | |

=== Assembly Election 2013 ===
2013 Meghalaya Legislative Assembly election: Gambegre
| Party | Candidate | Votes | % | ±% |
|---|---|---|---|---|
| Independent | Saleng A. Sangma | 7,260 | 37.02% | New |
| INC | Besterfield N. Sangma | 3,803 | 19.39% | New |
| Independent | Tarang A. Sangma | 2,862 | 14.60% | New |
| SP | Widnald D. Marak | 1,529 | 7.80% | New |
| GNC | Meckenson Marak | 1,248 | 6.36% | New |
| NPP | Ballen A. Sangma | 1,135 | 5.79% | New |
| Independent | Prewil Ch. Marak | 496 | 2.53% | New |
| Margin of victory | | 3,457 | 17.63% | |
| Turnout | | 19,609 | 91.44% | |
| Registered electors | | 21,445 | | |
| Independent win (new seat) | | | | |

== See also ==
- List of constituencies of the Meghalaya Legislative Assembly
- West Garo Hills district
