= Sunita Gajmer =

Indian politician

Member of Sikkim Legislative Assembly
- In office May 2019 – May 2024
- Preceded by: Arjun Kumar Ghatani
- Succeeded by: Madan Cintury
- Constituency: Salghari-Zoom

Personal details
- Party: Sikkim Krantikari Morcha

Sunita Gajmer is an Indian politician. She was elected to the Sikkim Legislative Assembly from Zoom Salghari in the 2019 Sikkim Legislative Assembly election as a member of the Sikkim Krantikari Morcha.
