= Raju Basnet =

Indian MLA from Sikkim (born 1969)

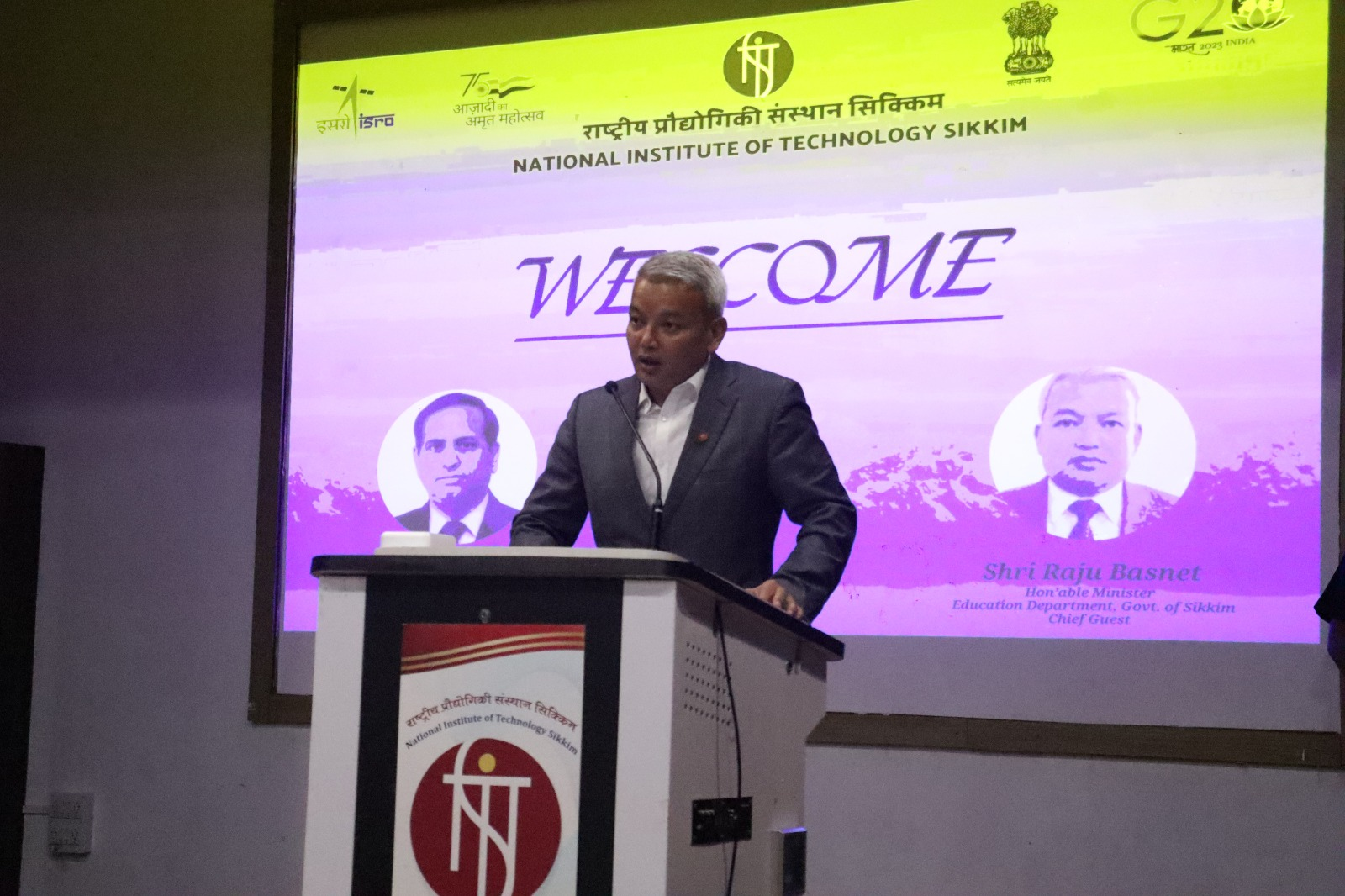
- Shri Raju Basnet in 2024

Minister of Education Department, Law Department and Sports & Youth Affairs Department
- Incumbent
- Assumed office 11 June 2024
- Governor: Lakshman Acharya; Om Prakash Mathur
- Chief Minister: Prem Singh Tamang
- Preceded by: Kunga Nima Lepcha

Parliamentary Affairs
- Incumbent
- Assumed office 11 June 2024
- Governor: Lakshman Acharya; Om Prakash Mathur
- Chief Minister: Prem Singh Tamang

Member of Sikkim Legislative Assembly
- Incumbent
- Assumed office 1 June 2024
- Preceded by: Em Prasad Sharma
- Constituency: Namchaybong

Personal details
- Born: 1968 or 1969 (age 56–57) Chalamthang, Pakyong, Sikkim
- Party: Sikkim Krantikari Morcha
- Education: Master of Business Administration
- Alma mater: Sikkim Manipal University
- Occupation: Bureaucrat, politician

Raju Basnet (born 1969) is an Indian politician from Sikkim state. He is an MLA from Namchaybong Assembly constituency in Pakyong district. He represents Sikkim Krantikari Morcha Party and won the 2024 Sikkim Legislative Assembly election. He is Minister of Education, Sports & Youth Affairs, Law & Parliamentary Affairs Department in Second Tamang ministry.

== Early life and education ==
Basnet is from Chalamthang, Pakyong district, Sikkim. His father Lall Das Basnett was a farmer. He completed his MBA in Banking and Finance at Sikkim Manipal University in 2012. He took voluntary retirement as a government employee after 33 years of service. He joined the State Mechanical Engineering Service in January 1991 as an assistant engineer and went on to work in 20 posts in seven departments. Before taking retirement, he was the secretary to the government in the transport department for five years, from 2019.

== Career ==
Basnet won the 2024 Sikkim Legislative Assembly election representing Sikkim Krantikari Morcha Party from Namchaybong Assembly constituency. He polled 7,195 votes and defeated his nearest rival, Pawan Kumar Chamling of Sikkim Democratic Front, by a margin of 2,256 votes.
