= Sudesh Kumar Subba =

Indian politician

Member of Sikkim Legislative Assembly
- Incumbent
- Assumed office 1 June 2024
- Preceded by: Narendra Kumar Subba
- Constituency: Maneybong Dentam

Sudesh Kumar Subba is an Indian politician from Sikkim belonging from the Sikkim Krantikari Morcha. He is a member of the Legislative Assembly in the 11th Sikkim Legislative Assembly. He won over SDF's Tika Ram Chettri with 6039 votes.

== Education ==
He graduated from Sikkim Government Degree College in 1998.
