= Jawaharbhai Chavda =

Indian Bharatiya Janata Party politician

Jawaharbhai Pethaljibhai Chavda

Member of Gujarat Legislative Assembly
- In office (1990-1995), (2007-2012), (2012-2017), (2017-2019), (2019 – 2022)
- Preceded by: Jashumati Arjunbhai Patel
- Succeeded by: Arvindbhai Ladani
- Constituency: Manavadar

Personal details
- Born: Jawaharbhai Pethaljibhai Chavda
- Party: Bharatiya Janata Party
- Other political affiliations: Indian National Congress
- Education: Rajkumar College
- Occupation: Farmer and businessman
- Website: https://jawaharchavda.com/

Jawaharbhai Pethaljibhai Chavda is an Indian politician. He was elected to the Gujarat Legislative Assembly from Manavadar in the 2017 Gujarat Legislative Assembly election as a member of the Indian National Congress.

He was one of the four members of the Indian National Congress who shifted to Bharatiya Janata Party post 2017 Gujarat Legislative Assembly election. He won in the by-election in 2019 from the same seat. He became the Cabinet minister of Tourism and Fisheries in the Vijay Rupani ministry in March 2019.

== Early life and education ==
Jawahar Chavda was born on July 20, 1964, in Bhadajalia, Dhoraji region, Rajkot district (historically part of Gondal State). Though his father had settled in Junagadh, his birth was in Bhadajalia. He began his early education at Sharda Balmandir, Junagadh, from 1968 to 1972. In 1972, he enrolled at Rajkumar College, Rajkot. He attended Rajkumar College from 1972 to 1982. After passing his 10th standard in 1982, he moved to Ahmedabad for further education, initially joining Jyoti School and later transferring to GLS, Ahmedabad. In 1983, his studies were unexpectedly interrupted due to the sudden death of his elder brother, Subhashbhai Chavda and at the age of 19, he was entrusted with the management of Nutan Ginning Mill in Manavadar by his father, marking the beginning of his early leadership experience.
