= G. T. Dhungel =

Indian politician

Gay Tshering Dhungel
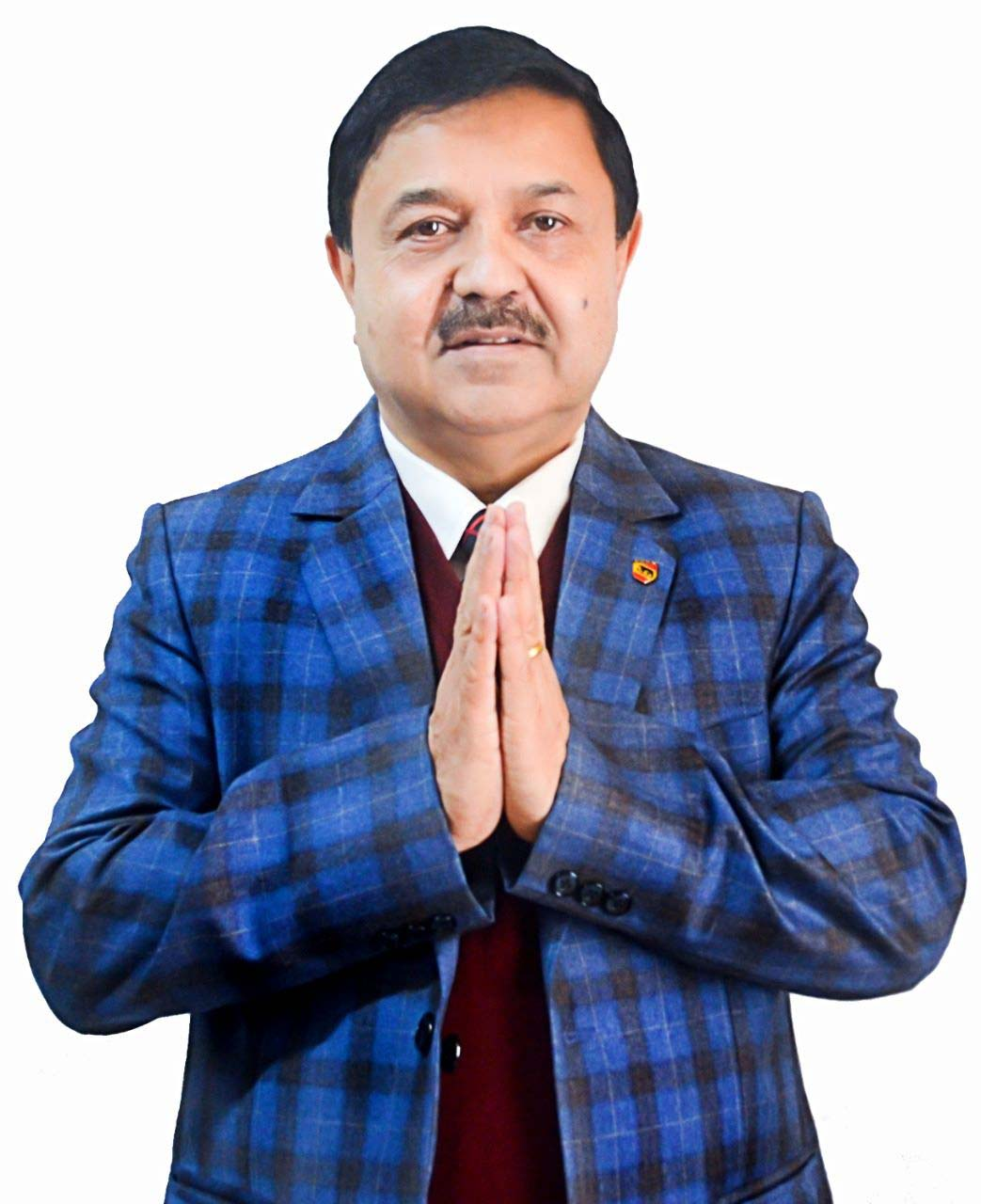

Minister of Health & Family Welfare Department of Sikkim
- Incumbent
- Assumed office 11 June 2024
- Preceded by: Mani Kumar Sharma

Minister of Culture Department of Sikkim
- Incumbent
- Assumed office 11 June 2024
- Preceded by: Bishnu Kumar Sharma

Member of Sikkim Legislative Assembly
- Incumbent
- Assumed office 2019
- Preceded by: Timothy William Basnett
- Constituency: Upper Tadong

Personal details
- Born: 22 August 1959 (age 67) Kingdom of Sikkim
- Party: Sikkim Krantikari Morcha
- Parents: Lt. Augustine Dhungel (father); Lt. Pema Ongkit Lepcha (mother)
- Education: Assam Engineering College, Guwahati. Bachelor of Engineering (Civil)
- Occupation: Politician

Gay Tshering Dhungel is an Indian politician who is currently serving as the Member of Sikkim Legislative Assembly from the Upper Tadong Constituency. He is a minister in Second Tamang ministry.

He is a member of the Sikkim Krantikari Morcha which he joined in 2019.

== Early life and education ==
He was born in Sikkim to the Lt. Augustine Dhungel and Pema Ongkit Lepcha in 1959. He has done his schooling from Victoria Boys' School (Kurseong) and completed Bachelor of Engineering (Civil) from Assam Engineering College, Guwahati, in 1984.

== Political career ==
Dhungel is a retired engineer and bureaucrat who turned to politics in 2019. He won the 2019 Sikkim Legislative Assembly election for Sikkim Democratic Front party and was elected MLA from 25-Upper Tadong Constituency.

Dhungel defeated Anand Lama by 416 votes.

Currently, he is the advisor to the Road and Bridges Department, Smart City Gangtok and Namchi, PHE Department and Irrigation & Flood Control Department, Government of Sikkim.
