= Sukhavant Singh =

Indian politician

Member of Rajasthan Legislative Assembly
- Incumbent
- Assumed office 23 November 2024
- Preceded by: Zubair Khan
- Constituency: Ramgarh

Personal details
- Political party: Bharatiya Janata Party
- Profession: Politician

Sukhavant Singh is an Indian politician from Rajasthan. He is a member of the Rajasthan Legislative Assembly since 2024, representing Ramgarh Assembly constituency as a member of the Bharatiya Janata Party.

== See also ==
- List of chief ministers of Rajasthan
- Rajasthan Legislative Assembly
