= Garjaman Gurung =

Indian politician

Garjaman Gurung is a Sikkim Democratic Front politician from Sikkim. He was elected in Sikkim Legislative Assembly election in 2014 from Temi-Namphing constituency as candidate of Sikkim Democratic Front. He was minister of Sikkim Public Works (Roads and Bridges) and Cultural Affairs & Heritage in Pawan Chamling fifth ministry from 2014 to 2019.

== Electoral performance ==
Election	Constituency	Party	Result	Votes %	Opposition Candidate	Opposition Party	Opposition vote %	Ref
2019	Temi–Namphing	SDF	Lost	45.16%	Bedu Singh Panth	SKM	51.70%	
2014	Temi–Namphing	SDF	Won	55.38%	Lalit Sharma	SKM	41.78%	
2004	Temi–Tarku	SDF	Won	75.62%	Laxmi Prasad Tiwari	INC	23.00%	
1999	Temi–Tarku	SDF	Won	57.76%	Dil Kumari Bhandari	SSP	40.35%	
1994	Temi–Tarku	SDF	Won	55.89%	Indra Bahadur Rai	SSP	36.68%	
1985	Temi–Tarku	Independent	Lost	2.29%	Indra Bahadur Rai	SSP	67.84%	
