= Arvindbhai Ladani =

Indian politician

Arvindbhai Jinabhai Ladani

Member of Gujarat Legislative Assembly
- Incumbent
- Assumed office (2022-2024), (2024-Present)
- Preceded by: Jawaharbhai Chavda
- Constituency: Manavadar

Personal details
- Born: Arvindbhai Jinabhai Ladani
- Party: Bharatiya Janata Party
- Other political affiliations: Indian National Congress
- Education: MT Dhamsania College Rajkot
- Occupation: Farmer

Arvindbhai Jinabhai Ladani is an Indian politician from Gujarat. He was elected to the Gujarat Legislative Assembly from Manavadar Assembly constituency in Junagadh district in the 2022 Gujarat Legislative Assembly election representing the Indian National Congress.

He resigned from the Indian National Congress on 6 March 2024 and joined the Bharatiya Janata Party. He won from the same seat in the 2024 By Election.
