= Em Prasad Sharma =

Indian politician

Member of Sikkim Legislative Assembly
- In office May 2019 – May 2024
- Preceded by: Bek Bahadur Rai
- Succeeded by: Raju Basnet
- Constituency: Namcheybong

Personal details
- Born: 1 April 1975 (age 51)
- Party: Sikkim Krantikari Morcha
- Other political affiliations: Indian National Congress, Sikkim Democratic Front
- Profession: Social Worker and Farmer

Em Prasad Sharma (born 1 April 1975) is an Indian politician. He is a member of the Sikkim Krantikari Morcha party (SKM). He is a member of the Sikkim Legislative Assembly (MLA).

In 2009 EM Prasad Sharma contested for MLA for Indian National Congress Namcheybong.

He is the Honorable Advisor to the Excise Department for the Government of Sikkim.
