= Temi–Namphing Assembly constituency =

Constituency of the Sikkim legislative assembly in India

Coordinates: 27.24°N 88.46°E

Temi-Namphing
- Constituency No. 14 for the Sikkim Legislative Assembly

Constituency details
- Country: India
- Region: Northeast India
- State: Sikkim
- District: Namchi
- Lok Sabha constituency: Sikkim
- Established: 2008
- Total electors: 14,225
- Reservation: None

Member of Legislative Assembly
- 11th Sikkim Legislative Assembly
- Incumbent Bedu Singh Panth
- Party: SKM
- Alliance: NDA
- Elected year: 2024

Temi–Namphing Assembly constituency is one of the 32 assembly constituencies of Sikkim, a north east state of India. This constituency falls under Sikkim Lok Sabha constituency.

== Members of the Legislative Assembly ==
Election	Member	Party
2009	Bedu Singh Panth	Sikkim Democratic Front
2014	Garjaman Gurung	Sikkim Democratic Front
2019	Bedu Singh Panth	Sikkim Krantikari Morcha
2024	Bedu Singh Panth	Sikkim Krantikari Morcha

== Election results ==
=== Assembly Election 2024 ===
2024 Sikkim Legislative Assembly election: Temi–Namphing
Party	Candidate	Votes	%	±%
SKM	Bedu Singh Panth	6,759	51.84%	▲0.14
SDF	Suman Kumar Tewari	3,201	24.55%	▼20.61
CAP–Sikkim	Bikash Sharma	2,616	20.06%	New
BJP	Bhupendra Giri	303	2.32%	New
NOTA	None of the Above	159	1.22%	▲0.52
Margin of victory		3,558	27.29%	▲20.75
Turnout		13,038	84.31%	▲1.58
Registered electors		15,465		▲8.72
SKM hold		Swing	▲0.14	

=== Assembly election 2019 ===
2019 Sikkim Legislative Assembly election: Temi–Namphing
Party	Candidate	Votes	%	±%
SKM	Bedu Singh Panth	6,084	51.70%	▲9.92
SDF	Garjaman Gurung	5,314	45.16%	▼10.22
INC	Deepak Kumar Bhandari	146	1.24%	▲0.16
HSP	Durga Bahadur Chhetri	142	1.21%	New
NOTA	None of the Above	82	0.70%	▼1.07
Margin of victory		770	6.54%	▼7.05
Turnout		11,768	82.73%	▼1.02
Registered electors		14,225		▲16.63
SKM gain from SDF		Swing	▼3.68	

=== Assembly election 2014 ===
2014 Sikkim Legislative Assembly election: Temi–Namphing
Party	Candidate	Votes	%	±%
SDF	Garjaman Gurung	5,657	55.38%	▲3.24
SKM	Lalit Sharma	4,268	41.78%	New
NOTA	None of the Above	180	1.76%	New
INC	Deepak Bhandari	110	1.08%	▼31.24
Margin of victory		1,389	13.60%	▼6.22
Turnout		10,215	83.75%	▼1.21
Registered electors		12,197		▲18.05
SDF hold		Swing	▲3.24	

=== Assembly election 2009 ===
2009 Sikkim Legislative Assembly election: Temi–Namphing
Party	Candidate	Votes	%	±%
SDF	Bedu Singh Panth	4,577	52.14%	New
INC	Lalit Sharma	2,837	32.32%	New
Independent	Garja Man Rai	985	11.22%	New
Sikkim Gorkha Party	Ugen Tamang	231	2.63%	New
Independent	Kharga Bahadur Gurung	148	1.69%	New
Margin of victory		1,740	19.82%	
Turnout		8,778	84.96%	
Registered electors		10,332		
SDF win (new seat)				

== See also ==
- Sikkim Lok Sabha constituency
- Namchi district
