= Sarwat Karim Ansari =

Indian politician (1956–2023)

Member of the Uttarakhand Legislative Assembly
- In office 10 March 2022 – 30 October 2023
- Preceded by: Qazi Nizamuddin, INC
- Succeeded by: Qazi Nizamuddin, INC
- Constituency: Manglaur
- In office 6 March 2012 – 11 March 2017
- Preceded by: Qazi Nizamuddin, BSP
- Succeeded by: Qazi Nizamuddin, INC

Personal details
- Born: 26 August 1956 Manglaur, Haridwar district, Uttar Pradesh, India
- Died: 30 October 2023 (aged 67) Delhi, India
- Party: Bahujan Samaj Party

Sarwat Karim Ansari (26 August 1956 – 30 October 2023) was an Indian politician from the Bahujan Samaj Party, in the state of Uttarakhand. He represented the Manglaur constituency in the 3rd and 5th Uttarakhand legislative Assembly. Ansari died from heart disease on 30 October 2023, at the age of 67.

== Positions held ==
Year	Description
2012–2017	Elected to 3rd Uttarakhand Assembly: Member of Public Accounts Committee (2012–2013); Member of Petition Committee (2012–2013); Member of Uttarakhand Waqf Board
2022–2023	Elected to 5th Uttarakhand Assembly: Member of Uttarakhand Waqf Board

== Electoral performances ==
Year	Election	Party	Constituency Name	Result	Votes gained	Vote share%	Margin
2002	1st Uttarakhand Assembly	Indian National Congress	Manglaur	Lost	14,561	27.5%	6,594
2007	2nd Uttarakhand Assembly	Indian National Congress	Manglaur	Lost	18,629	26.9%	6,930
2012	3rd Uttarakhand Assembly	Bahujan Samaj Party	Manglaur	Won	24,706	34.03%	698
2017	4th Uttarakhand Assembly	Bahujan Samaj Party	Manglaur	Lost	28,684	35.45%	2,668
2022	5th Uttarakhand Assembly	Bahujan Samaj Party	Manglaur	Won	32,660	37.18%	598
