= Narendra Kumar Subba =

Indian politician

Member of Sikkim Legislative Assembly
- In office May 2014 – May 2024
- Preceded by: Chandra Maya Subba
- Succeeded by: Sudesh Kumar Subba
- Constituency: Maneybong Dentam

Personal details
- Party: Bharatiya Janata Party (2019-present)

Narendra Kumar Subba is a Bharatiya Janata Party politician from Sikkim. He has been elected in Sikkim Legislative Assembly election in 2014 and 2019 from Maneybong Dentam constituency as candidate of Sikkim Democratic Front but later he joined Bharatiya Janata Party. He was minister of Urban Development, Housing, Food, Civil Supplies and Consumer Affairs in Pawan Chamling fifth ministry from 2014 to 2019.
