= Nar Bahadur Dahal =

Indian politician

- नरबहादुर दाहाल

Minister of Roads and Bridges of Sikkim
- Incumbent
- Assumed office 11 June 2024
- Governor: Lakshman Acharya; Om Prakash Mathur
- Chief Minister: Prem Singh Tamang
- Preceded by: Samdup Lepcha

Member of the Sikkim Legislative Assembly
- Incumbent
- Assumed office 2 June 2024
- Preceded by: Mani Kumar Sharma
- Constituency: Khamdong-Singtam

Personal details
- Party: Sikkim Krantikari Morcha

Nar Bahadur Dahal is an Indian politician from Sikkim belonging from the Sikkim Krantikari Morcha. He is a member of the Legislative Assembly in the 11th Sikkim Legislative Assembly. He won over SDF's Mani Kumar Sharma by a margin of 1739 votes.

== Education ==
He graduated from Sikkim Government Degree College,University of North Bengal in 1995.He was AAA+ Government Contractor with Sikkim Government
