= Nar Bahadur Khatiwada =

Indian politician

Member of the Sikkim Legislative Assembly
- In office 1979–1984
- Preceded by: New constituency
- Succeeded by: Indra Bahadur Rai
- Constituency: Temi-Tarku
- In office 1975–1979
- Constituency: Dentam

Member of the Sikkim State Council
- In office 1974–1975
- Preceded by: New constituency
- Constituency: Dentam

Personal details
- Born: Gangtok, Kingdom of Sikkim
- Party: Sikkim Prajatantra Congress
- Other political affiliations: Sikkim National Congress
- Profession: Lawyer, advisor & consultant

Nar Bahadur Khatiwada (born 1947) is a politician and lawyer from Sikkim.

He was elected to the Sikkim Assembly in 1974 from Dentam Constituency. Khatiwada won Temi-Tarku seat in the 1979 Sikkim Legislative Assembly election, standing as a Sikkim Prajatantra Congress candidate.

Nar Bahadur Khatiwada completed his Bachelor of Arts (Honours) in Political Science and Bachelor of Laws (LL.B) from North Bengal University (NBU). He is a member of Bar Council of West Bengal. He is also a Member of the Supreme Court Bar Association. He was appointed Additional Advocate General for the state of Sikkim from 22 December 2000 to 13 February 2004. He was designated Senior Advocate by the Hon’ble High Court of Sikkim.

== Early life and education ==
Nar Bahadur Khatiwada was born to Dal Bahadur Khatiwada, a WW-II veteran who served in 3rd Battalion of the 5th Regiment, Gorkha Rifles of the British Indian Army and Lachimaya Khatiwada on 14 April 1947 in Bhaluthang, a village of West Sikkim.

He did his initial schooling in Pelling Senior Secondary School, West Sikkim. While he was studying in Class X, he joined electioneering campaign for Kharga Bahadur Khatiwada, his uncle, of Kazi Lhendup Dorjee’s Sikkim National Congress party which was in the opposition for the Sikkim Council elected in the 1970.

As a result, he was not allowed to continue his studies in Sikkim. L D Kazi, who went on to become the first Chief Minister of Sikkim, not only took him to Kalimpong for completing his schooling in Scottish University Mission Institution School but also legally adopted him as his son. After completing schooling in 1971, Nar Bahadur Khatiwada joined Government College, Kalimpong and graduated in Political Science (Hon).

== Political career ==
In Kalimpong, he became the student and youth leader and organized Sikkim youths studying outside Sikkim and motivated them for bringing about democracy in the state of Sikkim.

In 1972, Sikkim National Congress published Bulletin number 2 under the name of Nar Bahadur Khatiwada as Assistant Publicity Secretary. The said Bulletin inter alia wrote "....there can be no king without the people but there are countries without king. As such, the Chogyal and his coterie must see the writings on the wall and give democracy to the people of Sikkim and or else a day will come when the Chogyal will have to hand over power to strange successor". Taking this as a seditious statement, the Chogyal administration registered a case against LD Kazi, Publicity Secretary Dhan Bahadur Gurung and Nar Bahadur Khatiwada in 1972.

In 1973, there was a popular peoples’ revolution for democracy, one man one vote with a written constitution etc. in which Nar Bahadur Khatiwada played an important role in mobilising the Sikkimese people. This movement ultimately resulted in the merger of Sikkim with the Indian Union in 1975 as the 22nd State. He was elected as Member of Sikkim Legislative Assembly for two consecutive terms i.e. from 1974 to 1979 and 1979 to 1985.

He stood again as a SPC candidate in Temi-Tarku in 1985, but lost the seat. He finished in third place.

In 1989 and 1994 he contested the Temi-Tarku seat as an Indian National Congress candidate,

Nar Bahadur Khatiwada contested the 1999 Lok Sabha elections from 4-Darjeeling Parliamentary Constituency as a Congress (I) candidate. He finished in second place with 24.96% of the votes, as the Gorkha National Liberation Front boycotted the elections due to which the Gorkhas of Darjeeling hills didn't exercise their franchise, he stood second with about 1.5 lakh votes.

He contested the 2014 Lok Sabha elections from 1-Sikkim Parliamentary Constituency as a Bharatiya Janata Party candidate. He is a member of the Bharatiya Janata Party and is actively involved in organizing the base of the party in Sikkim which till date since its merger has only been ruled by Regional parties. He is working for the party in other states as well.

Election Year	Legislature	Constituency	Party	Result
1974	Sikkim State Council	Dentam	Sikkim National Congress	Won
1979	Sikkim Legislative Assembly	Temi-Tarku	Sikkim Prajatantra Congress	Won
1985	Sikkim Legislative Assembly	Temi-Tarku	Sikkim Prajatantra Congress	Lost
1989	Sikkim Legislative Assembly	Temi-Tarku	Indian National Congress	Lost
1994	Sikkim Legislative Assembly	Temi-Tarku	Indian National Congress	Lost
1999	Lok Sabha	Darjeeling	Indian National Congress	Lost
2014	Lok Sabha	Sikkim	Bharatiya Janata Party	Lost

== Awards ==
He was conferred the Roll of Honour 2000 by the government of Sikkim for his contribution towards ushering in the era of Democracy and providing leadership to the people of Sikkim. He was awarded the International Civil Golden Award by Civil Forum Nepal in the year 2005 (2061 B.S.). He was awarded the Sikkim Sewa Ratna (Highest civilian award of the state) in 2013 by the Government of Sikkim in recognition of his valuable contribution to the State.
