= Amarwara Assembly constituency =

Constituency of the Madhya Pradesh legislative assembly in India

Coordinates: 22.30°N 79.17°E

Amarwara
- Constituency No. 123 for the Madhya Pradesh Legislative Assembly

Constituency details
- Country: India
- Region: Central India
- State: Madhya Pradesh
- District: Chhindwara
- Lok Sabha constituency: Chhindwara
- Established: 1951
- Reservation: ST

Member of Legislative Assembly
- 16th Madhya Pradesh Legislative Assembly
- Incumbent Kamlesh Shah
- Party: Bharatiya Janata Party
- Elected year: 2024
- Preceded by: Premnarayan Thakur

Amarwara Assembly constituency is one of the 230 Vidhan Sabha (Legislative Assembly) constituencies of Madhya Pradesh state in central India.

It is part of Chhindwara Lok Sabha constituency. It has been reserved for Scheduled Tribe Candidates.

== Members of the Legislative Assembly ==
=== As a constituency of Madhya Pradesh (Nagpur) ===
Election	Member	Party
1952 (Note: 2-member constituency)	Narayan Maniramji Wadiwa	Indian National Congress
1952	Arjunsingh Sisodia	Indian National Congress

=== As a constituency of Madhya Pradesh ===
Election	Member	Party
1967	S. J. Thakur	Bharatiya Jana Sangh
1972	Udayabhanshah	Indian National Congress
1977	Dakhan Shah Thakur	Indian National Congress
1980	Prem Narayan Jagdish Prasad	Indian National Congress (I)
1985	Shailkumari	Indian National Congress
1990	Mehman Shah Uikey	Bharatiya Janata Party
1993	Premnarayan Thakur	Indian National Congress
1998	Premnarayan Thakur	Indian National Congress
2003	Manmohan Shah Batti	Gondwana Ganatantra Party
2008	Premnarayan Thakur	Bharatiya Janata Party
2013	Kamlesh Shah	Indian National Congress
2018	Kamlesh Shah	Indian National Congress
2023	Kamlesh Shah	Indian National Congress
2024^	Kamlesh Shah	Bharatiya Janata Party

- ^ denotes by-election

== Election results ==
=== 2024 bypoll ===
Madhya Pradesh Legislative Assembly by-election 2024: Amarwara
Party	Candidate	Votes	%	±%
BJP	Kamlesh Shah	83,105	40.84	▲3.54
INC	Dhiran Shah Inwati	80,078	39.35	▼9.00
GGP	Deviram Bhalavi	28,723	14.12	▲6.09
NOTA	None of the above	3,403	1.67	▼0.53
Majority		3,027	1.49	▼9.56
Turnout		2,03,491	78.38	▼10.73
BJP gain from INC		Swing		

=== 2023 ===
2023 Madhya Pradesh Legislative Assembly election: Amarwara
Party	Candidate	Votes	%	±%
INC	Kamlesh Shah	109,765	48.35	▲12.82
BJP	Monika Batti	84,679	37.30	▲10.77
GGP	Deviram Bhalavi	18,231	8.03	▼22.35
Independent	Santlal Parteti (Advocate)	3,681	1.62	
NOTA	None of the above	5,003	2.20	▼0.73
Majority		25,086	11.05	▲5.9
Turnout		227,034	89.09	▲1.48
INC hold		Swing		

=== 2018 ===
2018 Madhya Pradesh Legislative Assembly election: Amarwara
Party	Candidate	Votes	%	±%
INC	Kamlesh Shah	71,662	35.53	
GGP	Manmohan Shah Batti	61,269	30.38	
BJP	Premnarayan Thakur	53,499	26.53	
Independent	Kallulal Uikey	3,408	1.69	
Independent	Vinita Amodiya	2,294	1.14	
BSP	Sumran Uikey	2,099	1.04	
NOTA	None of the above	5,910	2.93	
Majority		10,393	5.15	
Turnout		201,670	87.61	
INC hold		Swing	▲4.55	

=== 2013 ===
2013 Madhya Pradesh Legislative Assembly election: Amarwara
Party	Candidate	Votes	%	±%
INC	Kamlesh Shah	55,684	30.98	
BJP	Uttam Thakur	51621	28.72	
ABGP	Manmohan Shah Batti	46379	25.80	
Independent	Devendra Kumar Narre	5092	2.83	
BSP	Judhiya Prasad Bhalavi	3650	2.03	
Independent	Siyalal Uikey	3632	2.02	
GGP	Santi Raj	2062	1.15	
Independent	Madan Uikey	1994	1.11	
SP	Sushil Ahke	1387	0.77	
NOTA	None of the Above	8232	4.58	
Majority				
Turnout		179733	83.15	
Swing to INC from BJP		Swing		

== See also ==
- Amarwara
