= Tumin–Lingee Assembly constituency =

Constituency of the Sikkim legislative assembly in India

Coordinates: 27.387°N 88.527°E

Tumin Lingee
- Constituency No. 16 for the Sikkim Legislative Assembly

Constituency details
- Country: India
- Region: Northeast India
- State: Sikkim
- District: Gangtok and Namchi
- Lok Sabha constituency: Sikkim
- Established: 2008
- Total electors: 15,888
- Reservation: BL

Member of Legislative Assembly
- 11th Sikkim Legislative Assembly
- Incumbent Samdup Tshering Bhutia
- Party: SKM
- Alliance: NDA
- Elected year: 2024

Tumin Lingee Legislative Assembly constituency is one of the 32 Legislative Assembly constituencies of Sikkim state in India. It lies half in Gangtok district and half in Namchi district.

This constituency is reserved for members of the Bhutia-Lepcha community.

== Members of the Legislative Assembly ==
Election	Member	Party
2009	Ugyen Tshering Gyatso Bhutia	Sikkim Democratic Front
2014	Ugyen Tshering Gyatso Bhutia	Sikkim Democratic Front
2019	Ugyen Tshering Gyatso Bhutia	Sikkim Democratic Front
2024	Samdup Tshering Bhutia	Sikkim Krantikari Morcha

== Election results ==
=== Assembly Election 2024 ===
2024 Sikkim Legislative Assembly election: Tumin–Lingee
Party	Candidate	Votes	%	±%
SKM	Samdup Tshering Bhutia	8,265	58.07%	▲10.60
SDF	Norzong Lepcha	4,177	29.35%	▼20.54
CAP–Sikkim	Pema Gyalpu Bhutia	885	6.22%	New
BJP	Passang Gyali Sherpa	593	4.17%	New
INC	Samdup Lepcha	197	1.38%	New
NOTA	None of the Above	115	0.81%	▼0.07
Margin of victory		4,088	28.72%	▲26.31
Turnout		14,232	84.88%	▲1.42
Registered electors		16,767		▲5.53
SKM gain from SDF		Swing	▲8.19	

=== Assembly election 2019 ===
2019 Sikkim Legislative Assembly election: Tumin–Lingee
Party	Candidate	Votes	%	±%
SDF	Ugyen Tshering Gyatso Bhutia	6,615	49.89%	▼12.37
SKM	Samdup Tshering Bhutia	6,295	47.47%	▲12.85
HSP	Bhaichung Bhutia	234	1.76%	New
NOTA	None of the Above	116	0.87%	▼0.03
Margin of victory		320	2.41%	▼25.22
Turnout		13,260	83.46%	▼1.42
Registered electors		15,888		▲16.76
SDF hold		Swing	▼12.37	

=== Assembly election 2014 ===
2014 Sikkim Legislative Assembly election: Tumin–Lingee
Party	Candidate	Votes	%	±%
SDF	Ugyen Tshering Gyatso Bhutia	7,191	62.26%	▲6.93
SKM	Nidup Tshering Lepcha	3,999	34.62%	New
INC	Pandup Lepcha	151	1.31%	▼39.45
NOTA	None of the Above	105	0.91%	New
AITC	Prem Tshering Lepcha	104	0.90%	New
Margin of victory		3,192	27.64%	▲13.06
Turnout		11,550	84.88%	▼0.01
Registered electors		13,607		▲27.17
SDF hold		Swing	▲6.93	

=== Assembly election 2009 ===
2009 Sikkim Legislative Assembly election: Tumin–Lingee
Party	Candidate	Votes	%	±%
SDF	Ugyen Tshering Gyatso Bhutia	5,026	55.33%	New
INC	Phuchung Bhutia	3,702	40.75%	New
Sikkim Gorkha Party	Mingma Tharbu Sherpa	160	1.76%	New
Independent	Pema Bhutia	152	1.67%	New
Margin of victory		1,324	14.58%	
Turnout		9,084	84.90%	
Registered electors		10,700		
SDF win (new seat)				

== See also ==
- List of constituencies of the Sikkim Legislative Assembly
- Gangtok district
- Namchi district
