= Bedu Singh Panth =

Indian politician

Member of Sikkim Legislative Assembly
- Incumbent
- Assumed office May 2019
- Preceded by: Garjaman Gurung
- Constituency: Temi Namphing

Minister of Tourism & Civil aviation and Commerce & Industries
- In office 27 May 2019 – 10 June 2024
- Preceded by: Ugyen Tshering Gyatso Bhutia
- Succeeded by: Tshering Thendup Bhutia

Member of Sikkim Legislative Assembly
- In office May 2009 – April 2014
- Preceded by: Constituency established
- Succeeded by: Garjaman Gurung
- Constituency: Temi Namphing

Deputy Speaker of the Sikkim Legislative Assembly
- In office December 1989 – June 1994
- Chief Minister: Nar Bahadur Bhandari
- Speaker: Dorjee Tshering
- Preceded by: Ram Lepcha
- Succeeded by: Dal Bahadur Gurung

Member of Sikkim Legislative Assembly
- In office May 1985 – November 1994
- Preceded by: Garjaman Gurung
- Succeeded by: Kedar Nath Rai
- Constituency: Wak

Personal details
- Born: Bedu Singh Panth; 3 December 1952 (age 73)
- Party: Sikkim Krantikari Morcha
- Other political affiliations: Sikkim Democratic Front, Sikkim Sangram Parishad

Bedu Singh Panth is an Indian politician. He was elected to the Sikkim Legislative Assembly from Temi Namphing in the 2019 Sikkim Legislative Assembly election and 2024 Sikkim Legislative Assembly election as a member of the Sikkim Krantikari Morcha. He is Minister of Tourism & Civil aviation and Commerce & Industries in P. S. Golay Cabinet.
