= Khamdong–Singtam Assembly constituency =

Constituency of the Sikkim legislative assembly in India

Coordinates: 27.19°N 88.44°E

Khamdong-Singtam
- Constituency No. 17 for the Sikkim Legislative Assembly

Constituency details
- Country: India
- Region: Northeast India
- State: Sikkim
- District: Gangtok
- Lok Sabha constituency: Sikkim
- Established: 2008
- Total electors: 13,067
- Reservation: None

Member of Legislative Assembly
- 11th Sikkim Legislative Assembly
- Incumbent Nar Bahadur Dahal
- Party: SKM
- Alliance: NDA
- Elected year: 2024

Khamdong-Singtam Assembly constituency is one of the 32 assembly constituencies of Sikkim, a north east state of India. This constituency falls under Sikkim Lok Sabha constituency.

== Members of the Legislative Assembly ==
Election	Member	Party
2009	Am Prasad Sharma	Sikkim Democratic Front
2014	Somnath Poudyal	Sikkim Democratic Front
2019	Dr. Mani Kumar Sharma	Sikkim Krantikari Morcha
2024	Nar Bahadur Dahal	Sikkim Krantikari Morcha

== Election results ==
=== Assembly Election 2024 ===
2024 Sikkim Legislative Assembly election: Khamdong–Singtam
Party	Candidate	Votes	%	±%
SKM	Nar Bahadur Dahal	5,882	52.87%	▲2.48
SDF	Dr. Mani Kumar Sharma	4,143	37.24%	▼4.93
BJP	Chetan Sapkota	506	4.55%	▼0.71
CAP–Sikkim	Sumati Chettri	450	4.04%	New
NOTA	None of the Above	75	0.67%	▲0.09
INC	Tanka Nath Adhikari	70	0.63%	▼0.05
Margin of victory		1,739	15.63%	▲7.40
Turnout		11,126	77.11%	▼4.09
Registered electors		14,428		▲10.42
SKM hold		Swing	▲2.48	

=== Assembly election 2019 ===
2019 Sikkim Legislative Assembly election: Khamdong–Singtam
Party	Candidate	Votes	%	±%
SKM	Dr. Mani Kumar Sharma	5,347	50.39%	▲4.08
SDF	Garjaman Gurung	4,474	42.16%	▼6.96
BJP	Sher Bahadur Karki	558	5.26%	▲3.27
INC	Tula Ram Guragai	72	0.68%	▼0.23
HSP	Neeraj Adhikari	67	0.63%	New
NOTA	None of the Above	62	0.58%	▼1.08
Margin of victory		873	8.23%	▲5.42
Turnout		10,611	81.20%	▼2.72
Registered electors		13,067		▲14.18
SKM gain from SDF		Swing	▲1.27	

=== Assembly election 2014 ===
2014 Sikkim Legislative Assembly election: Khamdong–Singtam
Party	Candidate	Votes	%	±%
SDF	Somnath Poudyal	4,718	49.13%	▼7.24
SKM	Dr. Mani Kumar Sharma	4,448	46.31%	New
BJP	Madan Kumar Sharma	191	1.99%	New
NOTA	None of the Above	160	1.67%	New
INC	Punya Prasad Koirala	87	0.91%	▼38.86
Margin of victory		270	2.81%	▼13.79
Turnout		9,604	83.92%	▼0.32
Registered electors		11,444		▲26.44
SDF hold		Swing	▼7.24	

=== Assembly election 2009 ===
2009 Sikkim Legislative Assembly election: Khamdong–Singtam
Party	Candidate	Votes	%	±%
SDF	Am Prasad Sharma	4,298	56.37%	New
INC	Nar Bahadur Bhandari	3,032	39.76%	New
Sikkim Gorkha Party	Arun Kumar Pradhan	295	3.87%	New
Margin of victory		1,266	16.60%	
Turnout		7,625	84.24%	
Registered electors		9,051		
SDF win (new seat)				

== See also ==
- Sikkim Lok Sabha constituency
- Gangtok district
