= Madan Cintury =

Member of Sikkim Legislative Assembly
- Incumbent
- Assumed office 1 June 2024
- Preceded by: Sunita Gajmer
- Constituency: Salghari-Zoom
- In office 2009–2014
- Preceded by: Constituency established
- Succeeded by: Arjun Kumar Ghatani
- Constituency: Salghari-Zoom

Personal details
- Party: Sikkim Krantikari Morcha
- Other political affiliations: Sikkim Democratic Front

Madan Cintury is an Indian politician from Sikkim belonging from the Sikkim Krantikari Morcha. He is a member of the Legislative Assembly in the 11th Sikkim Legislative Assembly. He won with 5678 votes.
