= Zubair Khan (Indian politician) =

Indian politician (1963–2024)

Secretary - All India Congress Committee
- In office 17 June 2013 – 14 September 2024

Member of the Rajasthan Legislative Assembly
- In office 3 December 2023 – 14 September 2024
- Preceded by: Shafia Zubair
- Succeeded by: Gyan Dev Ahuja
- In office 2003–2008
- Preceded by: Gyan Dev Ahuja
- Succeeded by: Gyan Dev Ahuja
- In office 1990–1998
- Preceded by: Raghuwar Dayal
- Succeeded by: Gyan Dev Ahuja
- Constituency: Ramgarh

Personal details
- Born: 1 August 1963 Alwar, Rajasthan, India
- Died: 14 September 2024 (aged 61) Alwar, Rajasthan, India
- Party: Indian National Congress
- Spouse: Shafia Zubair
- Children: 2 sons
- Education: Jamia Millia Islamia

Zubair Khan (1 August 1963 – 14 September 2024) was an Indian politician from the Indian National Congress party.

== Career ==
Khan served as the Secretary of the All India Congress Committee and the Party In-Charge of Uttar Pradesh, having assumed this position on 17 June 2013. He was formerly elected as a member of the Rajasthan Legislative Assembly representing the Ramgarh constituency three times, in 1990, 1993 and 2003. He served as the General Secretary of the Rajasthan Pradesh Congress Committee from 2011 to 2013.

== Death ==
He died in Alwar on 14 September 2024, at the age of 61.
