= Maneybong–Dentam Assembly constituency =

Constituency of the Sikkim legislative assembly in India

Coordinates: 27.255°N 88.136°E

Maneybong-Dentam
- Constituency No. 3 for the Sikkim Legislative Assembly

Constituency details
- Country: India
- Region: Northeast India
- State: Sikkim
- District: Gyalshing
- Lok Sabha constituency: Sikkim
- Established: 2008
- Total electors: 15,174
- Reservation: None

Member of Legislative Assembly
- 11th Sikkim Legislative Assembly
- Incumbent Sudesh Kumar Subba
- Party: SKM
- Alliance: NDA
- Elected year: 2024

Maneybong Dentam Assembly constituency is one of the 32 assembly constituencies of Sikkim, a north east state of India. Maneybong Dentam is part of the Sikkim Lok Sabha constituency, located in the West district of Sikkim.

== Members of the Legislative Assembly ==
Election	Member	Party
2009	Chandra Maya Subba	Sikkim Democratic Front
2014	Narendra Kumar Subba	Sikkim Democratic Front
2019	Narendra Kumar Subba	Sikkim Democratic Front
2024	Sudesh Kumar Subba	Sikkim Krantikari Morcha

== Election results ==
=== Assembly Election 2024 ===
2024 Sikkim Legislative Assembly election: Maneybong–Dentam
Party	Candidate	Votes	%	±%
SKM	Sudesh Kumar Subba	8,553	60.16%	▲16.64
SDF	Tika Ram Chettri	2,514	17.68%	▼37.46
BJP	Narendra Kumar Subba	1,924	13.53%	New
CAP–Sikkim	Prakash Sharma	840	5.91%	New
NOTA	None of the Above	145	1.02%	▼0.31
Independent	Dipendra Gurung	122	0.86%	New
INC	Nar Bahadur Gurung	118	0.83%	New
Margin of victory		6,039	42.48%	▲30.85
Turnout		14,216	86.67%	▲1.42
Registered electors		16,403		▲8.10
SKM gain from SDF		Swing	▲5.02	

=== Assembly election 2019 ===
2019 Sikkim Legislative Assembly election: Maneybong–Dentam
Party	Candidate	Votes	%	±%
SDF	Narendra Kumar Subba	7,134	55.15%	▼17.28
SKM	Purna Hang Subba	5,630	43.52%	▲19.94
NOTA	None of the Above	172	1.33%	▼0.13
Margin of victory		1,504	11.63%	▼37.22
Turnout		12,936	85.25%	▼0.54
Registered electors		15,174		▲21.87
SDF hold		Swing	▼17.28	

=== Assembly election 2014 ===
2014 Sikkim Legislative Assembly election: Maneybong–Dentam
Party	Candidate	Votes	%	±%
SDF	Narendra Kumar Subba	7,737	72.43%	▲0.44
SKM	Birbal Tamling	2,519	23.58%	New
NOTA	None of the Above	156	1.46%	New
BJP	Keshar Man Gurung	140	1.31%	▼0.45
INC	Man Maya Limbu	130	1.22%	▼20.65
Margin of victory		5,218	48.85%	▼1.27
Turnout		10,682	85.79%	▼0.95
Registered electors		12,451		▲24.36
SDF hold		Swing	▲0.44	

=== Assembly election 2009 ===
2009 Sikkim Legislative Assembly election: Maneybong–Dentam
Party	Candidate	Votes	%	±%
SDF	Chandra Maya Subba	6,252	71.99%	New
INC	Laxuman Gurung	1,899	21.87%	New
BJP	Dilip Kumar Gurung	153	1.76%	New
SHRP	Tek Man Subba	131	1.51%	New
Independent	Santa Bir Gurung	113	1.30%	New
NCP	Krishna Lall Basnett	80	0.92%	New
Sikkim Gorkha Party	Nil Bikram Subba	57	0.66%	New
Margin of victory		4,353	50.12%	
Turnout		8,685	86.75%	
Registered electors		10,012		
SDF win (new seat)				

== See also ==
- Maneybong
- Gyalshing district
- List of constituencies of Sikkim Legislative Assembly
