= Saleng A. Sangma =

Indian politician

Member of Parliament, Lok Sabha
- Incumbent
- Assumed office 4 June 2024
- Preceded by: Agatha Sangma
- Constituency: Tura

Member of the Meghalaya Legislative Assembly
- In office 2013–2024
- Succeeded by: Mehtab Sangma
- Constituency: Gambegre

Personal details
- Born: Meghalaya, India
- Party: Indian National Congress (2023 - Present)
- Other political affiliations: Nationalist Congress Party (Before 2023)

Saleng A. Sangma is an Indian politician from Meghalaya. He currently serves as the member of the Lok Sabha for the Tura constituency of Meghalaya since June 2024. He was previously a member of the Meghalaya Legislative Assembly, representing Gambegre. He belongs to the Indian National Congress.
