= Manglaur =

Manglaur Riyasat
- Town
- Location in Uttarakhand, India Manglaur Riyasat (India)
- Coordinates: 29.80°N 77.87°E
- Country: India
- State: Uttarakhand
- District: Haridwar
- Elevation: 260 m (850 ft)

Population (2011)
  - Total: 52,971

Languages
  - Official: Hindi
  - Native: Khariboli
- Time zone: UTC+5:30 (IST)
- PIN: 247656
- Vehicle registration: UK
- Website: uk.gov.in

Manglaur is a town with a municipal board in the Haridwar district of the Indian state of Uttarakhand. The PIN code of Manglaur is 247656. Manglaur is located on National Highway 58 (Delhi–Haridwar). It is 175 km from Delhi and about 10 km from Roorkee.

During the British colonial period, it was a tehsil, and a temple still stands there. The middle school building near Gurukul used to serve as the Kachhari office. There was a qila, the walls of which still stand on Mandir Road, and that area is now residential.

== History ==
Manglaur is an old place in North India which has its own recognition. On one side, it has the matter of pride in being a historic place, and on the other, it has many good people who own considerable assets. History attests that the town's name derives from its founder, Mangal Sen. For a long time, it was the capital of King Mangal Sen, whose symbol is still present in the town today. There is also evidence from Ain-e-Akbar (by Abul Fazl) that it was a historical place.

Manglaur is a historic town with a brick fort built during the reign of King Vikramaditya. During the medieval Indian period, Manglaur was primarily under Gurjar control. During the British colonial period, it was known as Mundlana Riyasat, under the control of Rao Maharaj Singh Chauhan (a Gurjar chief), and comprised 37 villages.

At the time of King Vikramaditya (380–415 A.D), Mangal Sen had built this fort. One portion of the wall of that fort remains intact in the corner of the shrine of Shah Vilayat. The width of the wall is 12 ft, and inside the compound, there is a mosque, built by Gyasuddin Balban, whose khutba is fitted in its wall. Presently, the fort is converted into Mohalla Quila, which is surrounded by the following roads: Nagar Palika Chowk-Sarrafa Bazar road, Main Market-Haidri Chowk Road, and Mohalla Malakpura to Nagar Palika Parishad Road.

Most of the time, Manglaur was independent and experienced many ups and downs. For a short while during British rule, it became a far-east region of Punjab, but it was later given to the United Provinces of British India. There was also a time when it was declared a district, but British rule restored its status as a district and converted it back into a tehsil; later, the tehsil status was revoked, and Roorkee was made the tehsil.

Manglaur is listed in the Ain-i-Akbari as a pargana under the sarkar of Saharanpur, producing a revenue of 2,350,311 dams for the imperial treasury and supplying a force of 300 infantry and 40 cavalry. The building, which served as the tehsil's offices at the time, was converted into the Middle Oriental School. This building became known as "Middle School" after independence.

At that time, there was little population outside the town, which was divided into different Mohallas. These Mohallas still have old buildings. Mohalla Lal Bag (Lal Bara), Jain Gali, and Kathaira have some old buildings that bear witness to their history.

== Entry of Muslims ==
The Turušhka ruler Sultan Sebüktegin conquered Manglaur after he defeated the king of the Indus River region, who was known as Anandapala. Abu-Abbas bin Ahmad Asfar Aayni was Sebüktegin's minister at that time. At that time, Manglaur was an independent state. Its area was 5000 square miles at that time. It was conquered and briefly held by Sebüktegin. Still, it was not held for long, as Sebüktegin had to go back to Afghanistan, causing Manglaur to fall back into the hands of native Indian rulers as soon as Sebüktegin went back to Khorasan.

At the time of Sultan Mahmud Ghaznavi, the Farooqi family came to Manglaur, who founded a Madrassa there for the education of Muslims. In 1056 AD, a Muslim missionary named Sulaiman Gyasudeen Gauri brought the generation of Amirul Momineen Hasan to Manglaur for further education of the Muslims.

At that time, it was known as Dawaba Manglaur, Bhosak Pura Mangal Sen. There was a big factory (karkhana) of islah saji. Hasni was good in islah Saji and kamaan saji. Today, they are known as kamangarana.

Maulana Sheik Jamaluddin Gaznavi Mijaz Sheik Ahmad Chisti is from the Hasani generation whose grave is present in Mohalla Malakpura at the bank of Jamaal Pond. Today, this pond is known as Jamaal Garha. In the 17th century, a Sufi saint named Shah Abdul Ghafoor Kardatani came to Manglaur and died here, teaching Islam to the locals. Gyasudeen Balban built his shrine after his death.

In 1857, when the Great Indian Rebellion began against British rule, many Muslims of Manglaur joined the rebellion. They attacked many British Army outposts in and around the town of Manglaur. The Muslims in this region played a vital role during the rebellion, fighting against British rule. After the rebellion, a Madrassa named Jamiya Arbiya Al Muslimeen was established in Manglaur. During British rule until 1947, it was an important centre of learning and education for Muslims across British India. After the Partition of India in 1947, the town became a part of Uttarakhand state in India, and some Muslims fled to Delhi to board the refugee trains heading to the newly created nation of Pakistan. Still, the majority of Muslims stayed in India. Today, the Muslims are a well-established community in this town, and the town is also the only majority Muslim region in the state of Uttarakhand.

== Notable people ==
- Muhammad Nizamuddin, Indian politician from Uttarakhand and a four-term member of the Uttarakhand Legislative Assembly
- Tufail Ahmad Manglori, Indian Muslim scholar

== Demographics ==
The Manglaur Nagar Palika Parishad had a population of 52,971, of which 27,761 were males and 25,210 were females, as per the Census of India 2011 report. The population of children aged 0–6 was 8,240, accounting for 15.56% of Manglaur's total population (NPP). In Manglaur Nagar Palika Parishad, the female sex ratio is 908 compared to the state average of 963. Moreover, the child sex ratio in Manglaur is around 931, compared with Uttarakhand's state average of 890. The literacy rate in Manglaur city is 59.04%, which is lower than the state average of 78.82%. The male literacy rate is around 64.12%, while the female literacy rate is 53.43%.
