= Mani Kumar Sharma =

Indian politician

Dr. Mani Kumar Sharma

Member of Sikkim Legislative Assembly
- In office May 2019 – May 2024
- Preceded by: Somnath Poudyal
- Succeeded by: Nar Bahadur Dahal
- Constituency: Khamdong-Singtam

Minister of Health care, Human services & Family welfare, Social justice & Empowerment
- In office 2019 – February 2023
- Constituency: Khamdong-Singtam

Personal details
- Born: Mani Kumar Sharma
- Party: Sikkim Krantikari Morcha
- Other political affiliations: Sikkim Democratic Front
- Education: Utkal University
- Profession: Doctor

Dr. Mani Kumar Sharma is an Indian politician. He was elected to the Sikkim Legislative Assembly from Khamdong-Singtam in the 2019 Sikkim Legislative Assembly election as a member of the Sikkim Krantikari Morcha. He is the Minister of Healthcare, Human Services & Family Welfare, Social Justice & Empowerment in the P. S. Golay Cabinet.
