= Namcheybong =

- Village
- Country: India
- State: Sikkim
- District: Pakyong District
- Tehsil: Gangtok
- Gram Panchayat: Central Pendam GPU

Area
  - Total: 10,026 ha (24,770 acres)
- Elevation: 1,600–2,000 m (5,200–6,600 ft)
- Time zone: UTC+5.30 (Indian Standard Time)

Namcheybong, a small hamlet, located near Pakyong sub division at the Pakyong District of Sikkim state in India.
