= Kamlesh Shah =

Indian politician

Member of the Madhya Pradesh Legislative Assembly
- Incumbent
- Assumed office 2013
- Preceded by: Premnarayan Thakur
- Constituency: Amarwara

Personal details
- Born: 21 March 1972 (age 54)
- Party: Bharatiya Janata Party (2024-present)
- Other political affiliations: Indian National Congress
- Spouse: Madhvi Shah
- Education: 10th Pass
- Profession: Agriculturist

Kamlesh Pratap Shah (born 1972) is an Indian politician from Madhya Pradesh. He is a three time MLA from Amarwara constituency. He won the 2023 Assembly election, representing Indian National Congress, but later shifted to the Bharatiya Janata Party necessitating a by-election and won the 2024 by-election.

== Early life and education ==
Shah is from Amarwara, Chhindwara District, Madhya Pradesh. He is the son of Ugra Pratap Bhanu Shah. He married Madhvi Shah. He passed Class 10 in 1989 at Mathura Prasad School, Chhindwara.

== Political career ==
Shah won from Amarwara Assembly constituency in the 2023 Madhya Pradesh Legislative Assembly election representing Indian National Congress. He polled 109,765 votes and defeated his nearest rival, Monika Batti of the Bharatiya Janata Party, by a margin of 25,086 votes. He first became an MLA winning the 2013 Madhya Pradesh Legislative Assembly election. He retained the Amarwara Assembly constituency seat again in the 2018 Assembly election and won for the third time in the 2023 Assembly election.

== See also ==
- Madhya Pradesh Legislative Assembly
- 2013 Madhya Pradesh Legislative Assembly election
- 2008 Madhya Pradesh Legislative Assembly election
