= Krishna Kumari Rai =

Indian politician

Member of Sikkim Legislative Assembly
- In office 1 June 2024 – 13 June 2024
- Preceded by: Pawan Kumar Chamling
- Succeeded by: Satish Chandra Rai
- Constituency: Namchi-Singhithang

Personal details
- Party: Sikkim Krantikari Morcha
- Spouse: Prem Singh Tamang

Krishna Kumari Rai (born 1977) is an Indian politician from Sikkim. She belongs to Sikkim Krantikari Morcha party and was elected as a member of the Legislative Assembly to the 11th Sikkim Legislative Assembly but resigned a day after taking the oath.

== Early life and education ==
Kumari Rai graduated from Sikkim Government Degree College, University of North Bengal in 1993. She married Prem Singh Tamang, the chief minister of Sikkim. They have a daughter Prakriya Golay. She belongs to Rai community.

== Career ==
Kumari Rai won the 2024 Sikkim Legislative Assembly election representing Sikkim Krantikari Morcha from Namchi–Singhithang Assembly constituency in Namchi district. But she resigned after a day of taking the oath. It is reported that the party fielded her to get an entry into the constituency which is dominated by Rai community. Her son is expected to contest from this seat in the by-election. She polled 7901 votes and defeated her nearest rival SDF's Bimal Rai by a margin of 5302 votes.
