= Mehtab Sangma =

Indian politician

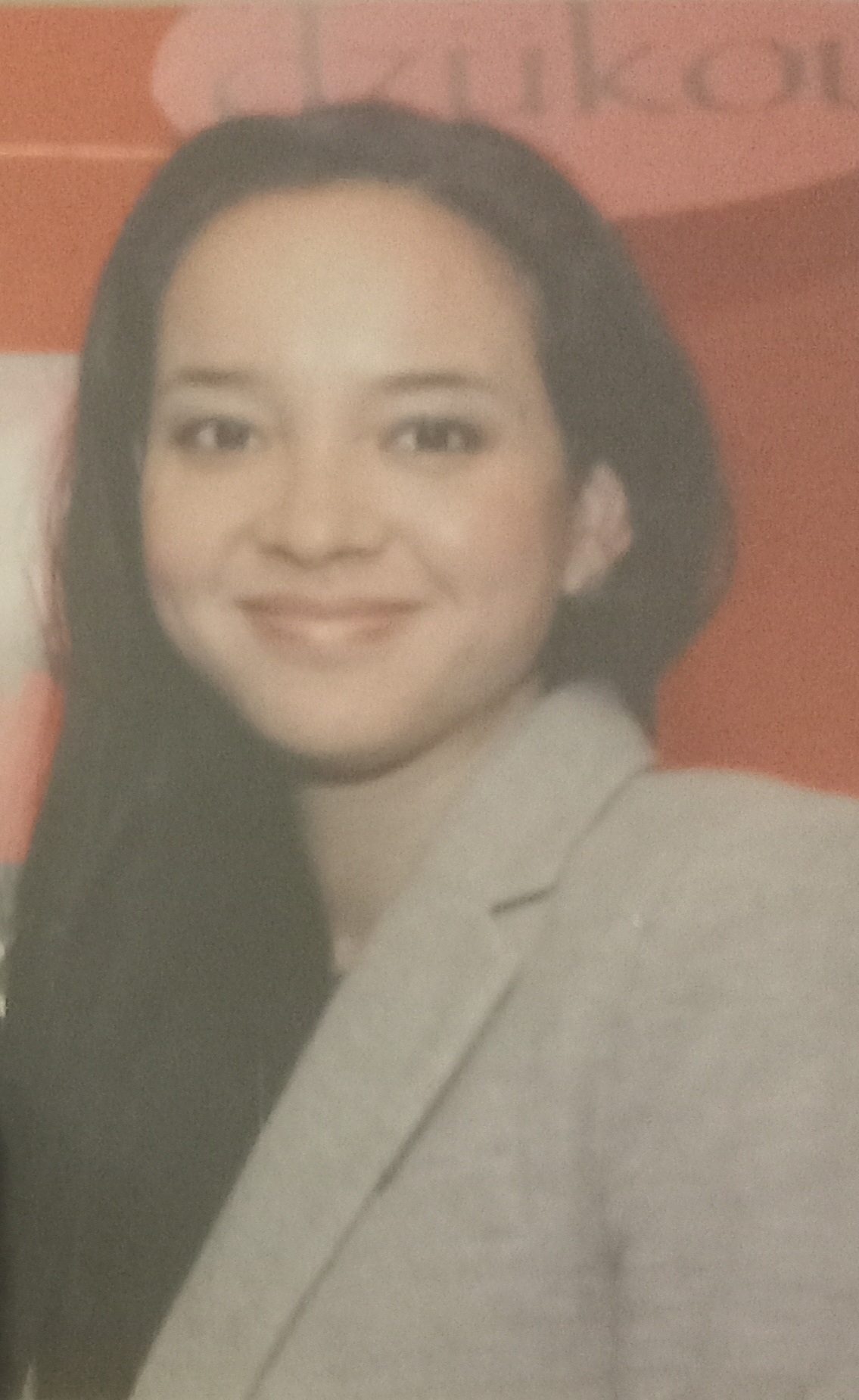
- Mehtab Sangma at Delhi's Dzukou Tribal Kitchen

Member of Meghalaya Legislative Assembly
- Incumbent
- Assumed office 2024
- Preceded by: Saleng A. Sangma
- Constituency: Gambegre

Personal details
- Party: National People's Party
- Spouse: Conrad Sangma (m. 2009)
- Children: 3
- Occupation: Politician, Doctor, Business

Mehtab Chandee Agitok Sangma is an Indian politician from Meghalaya. She is a member of the Meghalaya Legislative Assembly since 2024, representing the Gambegre Assembly constituency in West Garo Hills district, as a member of the National People's Party.

== Personal life ==
Mehtab Chandee Sangma was born on 14 December 1985 in Tura, Garo Hills, Meghalaya, India, into a Garo Christian family. She is married to Conrad Sangma, the Chief Minister of Meghalaya. The couple has three children: two daughters, Amara and Katelyn, and a son who was born in March 2025 in Delhi.

== Political career ==
On 23rd November, 2024, Mehtab Sangma contested the Gambegre by-election in Meghalaya as a candidate of the National People's Party (NPP). She led in the early rounds of counting and ultimately secured victory, filling the vacancy in the constituency. Her election strengthened the NPP's presence in the state assembly.

On September 8, 2025, Mrs. Chandee made her official debut in the Meghalaya Legislative Assembly during the first day of the autumn session, marking her first appearance as an elected representative. She was formally welcomed by Assembly Speaker Thomas A. Sangma and received a warm reception from fellow legislators. Sangma won the Gambegre by-election as a candidate of the National People's Party (NPP), strengthening the party's position in the state assembly.

== See also ==
- List of chief ministers of Meghalaya
- Meghalaya Legislative Assembly
