= Satish Chandra Rai (Sikkim politician) =

Indian politician

Member of Sikkim Legislative Assembly
- Incumbent
- Assumed office 23 November 2024
- Preceded by: Krishna Kumari Rai
- Constituency: Namchi-Singhithang

Personal details
- Party: Sikkim Krantikari Morcha
- Profession: Politician

Satish Chandra Rai is an Indian politician and a member of Sikkim Legislative Assembly from Namchi-Singhithang. He was elected in the 2024 Sikkim Legislative Assembly by-election as a member of the Sikkim Krantikari Morcha.
