= Muhammad Nizamuddin =

Indian politician

Qazi Muhammad Nizamuddin

Secretary of the Indian National Congress
- Incumbent
- Assumed office 2017
- President: Sonia Gandhi; Rahul Gandhi; Mallikarjun Kharge

Member of Legislative Assembly for Manglaur
- Incumbent
- Assumed office 2024
- Preceded by: Sarwat Kareem Ansari
- In office 2017–2022
- Preceded by: Sarwat Kareem Ansari
- Succeeded by: Sarwat Kareem Ansari
- In office 2002–2012
- Succeeded by: Sarwat Kareem Ansari

Personal details
- Born: 10 August 1974 (age 51)
- Party: Indian National Congress
- Parent: Qazi Muhammad Mohiuddin

Qazi Muhammad Nizamuddin is an Indian politician from Uttarakhand and a four term Member of the Uttarakhand Legislative Assembly. Nizamuddin is the incumbent MLA of Manglaur Assembly constituency. Nizamuddin is a secretary of the Indian National Congress.

== Positions held ==
Year	Description
2002	Elected to 1st Uttarakhand Assembly: Member - Committee on Government Assurances (2002–03); Member - Committee on PSE and Corporate (2003–04); Member - Committee on Government Assurances, Committee on Assembly Rules (2004–06); Member - Public Accounts Committee, Committee on Government Assurances, Committee on Assembly Rules (2006–07)
2007	Elected to 2nd Uttarakhand Assembly (2nd term): Member - Public Accounts Committee (2007–08); Member - Committee on Government Assurances (2009–10); Member - Committee on Housing (2009–11)
2017	Elected to 4th Uttarakhand Assembly (3rd term): Chairman - Public Accounts Committee (2017–22)
2024	Elected to 5th Uttarakhand Assembly (4th term)

== Elections contested ==
Year	Constituency	Result	Vote percentage	Opposition Candidate	Opposition Party	Opposition vote percentage	Ref
2002	Manglaur	Won	NA	Sarwat Kareem Ansari	INC	NA	
2007	Manglaur	Won	NA	Sarwat Kareem Ansari	INC	NA	
2012	Manglaur	Lost	NA	Sarwat Kareem Ansari	BSP	NA	
2017	Manglaur	Won	NA	Sarwat Kareem Ansari	BSP	NA	
2022	Manglaur	Lost	NA	Sarwat Kareem Ansari	BSP	NA	
2024 By-Election	Manglaur	Won	NA	Kartar Singh Bhadana	BJP	NA	
