= Ugyen Tshering Gyatso Bhutia =

Indian politician

MLA Ugyen Tshering Gyatso Bhutia

Member of Sikkim Legislative Assembly
- In office April 2009 – May 2024
- Preceded by: Constituency established
- Succeeded by: Samdup Tshering Bhutia
- Constituency: Tumin Lingee

Personal details
- Party: Bharatiya Janata Party (from 2019)
- Other political affiliations: Sikkim Democratic Front

Ugyen Tshering Gyatso Bhutia is a Bharatiya Janata Party politician from Sikkim. He was elected in the Sikkim Legislative Assembly elections in 2009, 2014, and 2019 by Tumin Lingee as a candidate of the Sikkim Democratic Front, but later he joined the Bharatiya Janata Party.
