= Gyan Dev Ahuja =

Indian politician

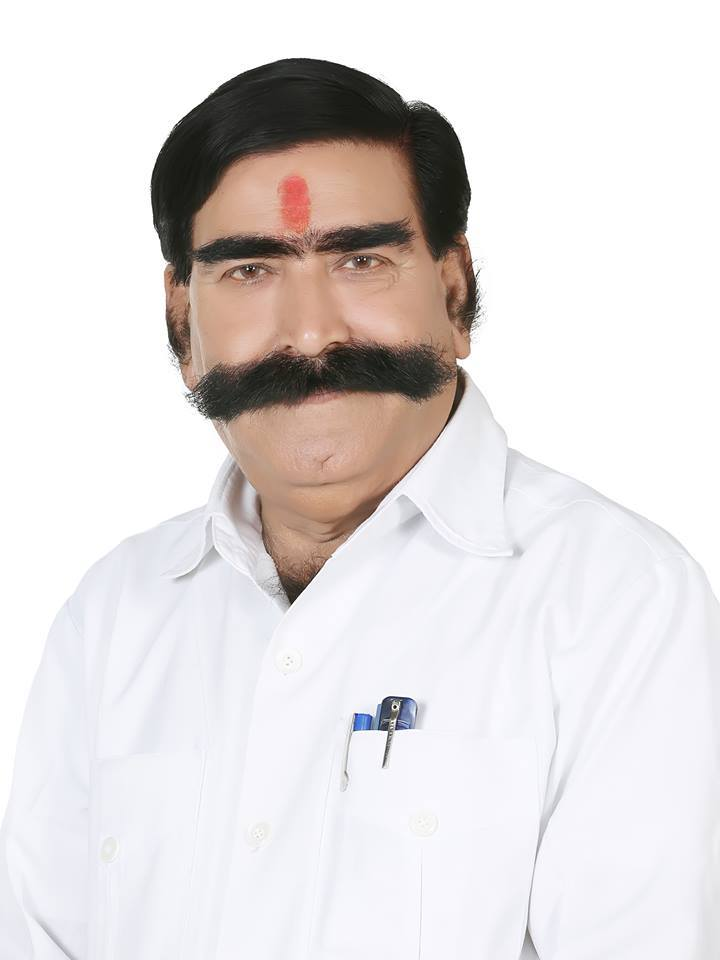

Member of the Rajasthan Legislative Assembly
- In office 2013–2018
- Constituency: Ramgarh

Personal details
- Born: Beawar, Rajasthan, India
- Other political affiliations: Bharatiya Janata Party (till 2025)
- Occupation: Politician

Gyan Dev Ahuja is an Indian politician. He was a member of the Rajasthan Legislative Assembly representing the Ramgarh constituency from 2013 to 2018.

== Controversy ==
On 24 December 2017, Ahuja gained controversy after he claimed that people who smuggle and slaughter cows would be killed.

On 30 July 2018, he praised cow vigilantes for lynching an alleged cow smuggler in Lalawandi village while also claiming that cow slaughter was a bigger crime than terrorism.

In April 2025, he did an act of purification of a temple by ganga jal following visit by state LoP Tika Ram Jully. After this act he was suspended from the Bharatiya Janata Party as notified by BJP state president Madan Rathore due to his indisciplinary action. An FIR was also lodged against him under SC-ST Act.
