= Sivok–Rangpo line =

Northwest Frontier Railway extension

Sivok-Rangpo Railway Line

Overview
- Status: Under construction
- Owner: Indian Railways
- Locale: West Bengal and Sikkim
- Termini: Sivok railway station; Rangpo railway station
- Stations: 05
- Website: www.ircon.org

Service
- Type: Regional rail
- System: North East Frontier Railway
- Operator: Northeast Frontier Railway
- Depot: Sivok

History
- Opened: under construction

Technical
- Track length: 44 km
- Track gauge: 1,676 mm (5 ft 6 in)

Sivok-Rangpo Railway Line, a 44.96 km long 1,676 mm (5 ft 6 in) broad gauge line connecting the Indian states of West Bengal (Sivok railway station on New Jalpaiguri–Alipurduar–Samuktala Road line near Siliguri in Darjeeling district) and Sikkim (Rangpo Railway Station in Pakyong District), is currently under construction. The railway line is strategically important for national security and socio-economic development, as the line will help troops and armaments move faster towards the Indo-Tibet border.

In the second phase and third phase, this line will be extended eastward to Gangtok (capital of Sikkim) and then to the Nathu La pass (on Sikkim's eastern border with Tibet). A separate fork from Melli will be extended towards west to Dentam.

== Route ==
Nearest big junction which connects to other parts of India New Jalpaiguri, 30 km from Sevoke via Siliguri.

| State | District | Station | Comments |
|---|---|---|---|
| West Bengal | Darjeeling district | Sivok railway station | In Sevoke. |
| West Bengal | Kalimpong district | Riyang railway station | In Rambi Bazar. |
| West Bengal | Kalimpong district | Tista Bazaar (underground station) | In Teesta Bazaar. |
| West Bengal | Kalimpong district | Melli railway station | Melli station itself lies in Melli in West Bengal. However, Melli is a border town partially spread across both West Bengal and Sikkim. |
| Sikkim | Pakyong District | Rangpo railway station | In Khanikhola locality of Majitar (4 km north of Rangpo). |

== Details ==
=== Features ===
| Feature | Sub-feature | Detail | Comments/References |
|---|---|---|---|
| Railway Administration | Zone | Northeast Frontier Railway | |
| Railway Administration | Division | Alipurduar railway division. | |
| Estimates | Length | 44.98 km | |
| Estimates | Cost | Rs.7876.92 crore | 2024 estimates. |
| Bridges | Major | 13 | |
| Bridges | Minor | 9 | |
| Tunnels | Total | 14 | |
| Tunnels | Route under tunnels | 38.53 km | 86% of route consists of tunnels. |
| Tunnels | Longest tunnel | 5.1 km | |

=== Construction ===
In October 2009, the foundation stone for construction was laid by the vice president of India. In May 2010, IRCON was awarded the contract for construction. Project has seen multiple delays, and the target completion date was extended several times, i.e. to December 2023 in November 2021, to August 2025 in May 2024, to December 2027 in January 2025.

=== Wildlife and environmental approval ===
The line traverses through Mahananda Wildlife Sanctuary in the foothills of Kangchenjunga mountain range of Himalayas, Darjeeling Forest Division, Kurseong Forest Division, Kalimpong Forest Division of West Bengal and Pakyong District Forest Division of Sikkim, runs parallel to Teesta River and crosses Rangpo River. It connects villages and towns, such as the Kalijhora, Birik daara, Lohapul, Rambi Bazar, Gailkhola, Teesta Bazaar, Chitrey, Melli, Kirnay, Tarkhola, Chanatar, Rangpo and Khanikhola, Majitar, Rangpo.

By 2013, the route alignment was not finalised due to lack of wildlife and environmental approval as the first 22 km through the forested elephant sanctuary. In February 2013, the railways made a proposal to the environment and forest ministry that railway will install elephant sensors along the stretch of the proposed railway line in Mahananda elephant sanctuary or run the trains at a speed of only 20 km per hour in the forest area and stop when an elephant is sighted close to the track. Delays caused the cost overruns, compared to the original year 2008 estimates of Rs.13.4 billion. In February 2016, Supreme Court of India approved the project with strict guidelines of the National Wildlife Board which had cleared the project in June 2015, but ordered restricted speed, wireless animal tracking sensors and allowed digging of tunnels only during daytime.

== Extensions and spurs ==
=== Rangpo-Gangtok line ===
Rangpo-Gangtok line: In the second phase, Sivok–Rangpo line the line will be extended from Rangpo to Gangtok.

=== Gangtok-Nathu La line ===
Gangtok-Nathu La line: In March 2023, the Indian Railways Minister Ashwini Vaishnaw confirmed the plans to extend the line, to Gangtok in next phase, and to Nathu La at the border to China in the subsequent phase.

=== Melli-Dentam line ===
Melli-Dentam line via Jorethang and Legship: Final Location Survey (FLS) was commissioned by the Indian Railway in May 2025 at the cost of INR2.5 cr. New rail line from southcentral Sikkim to West Sikkim will fork from the Melli junction in Southcentral Sikkim on Sivok–Rangpo line (which runs from Southcentral Sikkim to East Sikkim).

=== Yadong-Sikkim line ===
Shigatse-Yadong-Sikkim line: a 460 km standard gauge 120–160 km/h railway to link Yadong on Indo-Chinese border with current railhead Shigatse Railway Station, Tibet, and possibly onward with break of gauge (broad gauge) and continuing to Sikkim and beyond, subject to the India-China geopolitics with trans-shipment land ports is proposed. This line may share a good part of its routing with China-Nepal railway towards Gyirong and Kathmandu. Following 2020 China–India skirmishes, China seems keen to hasten Tibet rail projects.

== Current status ==
- 2022 Sept: 55% of 14 main tunnels (22 km out of 39 km tunnel route) and 40% of 13 major bridges were complete.
- 2025 May: Revised completion date moved to December 2027 (official update).
- 2026 Feb: 90% of the work has been completed and the work on Testa Bazaar railway station is almost complete.

== See also ==
- China–India railway
- Geostrategic railways under-construction in India
- India-China Border roads and rails
- North Eastern Railway Connectivity Project
- Rail transport in Bhutan
