= Melli railway station =

Railway station in West Bengal

Melli Railway Station

General information
- Location: National Highway 10, Melli, Kalimpong District, West Bengal; India
- Coordinates: 27.0906°N 88.4561°E
- Elevation: 100 metres (330 ft)
- System: Indian Railways Station
- Owner: Indian Railways
- Operator: Northeast Frontier Railway
- Line: Sivok–Rangpo line
- Platforms: 2
- Tracks: 2

Construction
- Structure type: At grade
- Parking: Yes ( after completion)
- Cycle facilities: No

Other information
- Status: Construction – new line
- Station code: MELI
- Zone(s): Northeast Frontier Railway
- Division(s): Alipurduar

History
- Opened: TBA
Location
- Location within West Bengal Location within India

Melli Railway Station lies in the town of Melli, Kalimpong district, West Bengal. The station lies in the under construction Sivok-Rangpo Railway Line. Melli Railway Station serves city of Kalimpong in West Bengal, and Namchi District, Geyzing District and Soreng District of Sikkim. The station is currently under construction by IRCON company.

== Trains ==
- In March 2023, Indian Railways Minister - Mr. Ashwini Vaishnaw announced that premium train - Vande Bharat Express will run from Rangpo railway station to Guwahati via Melli from December 2024.

== Under-construction extension ==
Sivok–Rangpo line, 44 km-long line, will provide access to Gangtok in Sikkim. The foundation stone for construction of a new railway line from Sevoke railway station to proposed Rangpo railway station on the border of Sikkim and West Bengal was laid in October 2009 by the vice president of India. In 2008, the line was proposed to be 53 km long with 1,676 mm (5 ft 6 in) broad gauge track but the final alignment is 45 km long with 3.5 km in Sikkim state and the rest in West Bengal state. The track will have 28 bridges and 14 tunnels and 38.5 km of the track will be in tunnels. Bridges over deep gorges and valleys will provide a scenic journey. The track is due to be constructed through the foothills of the Kanchanjungha mountain range and the Teesta river valley. New railway stations will be constructed at Melli, Teesta Bazaar, Geil Khola, Riang, and Rangpo.

The Indian Railways signed a contract with the construction company, IRCON, only in May 2010 but the final alignment had not been fixed for the first 22 km through elephant sanctuary forest even in 2013 and the final clearance of environment ministry had not been received. To obtain approval of the environment and forest ministry, the railways made a proposal in February 2013 to install elephant sensors along the stretch of the proposed railway line in Mahananda elephant sanctuary or run the trains at a speed of only 20 km per hour in the forest area and stop when an elephant is sighted close to the track. People of two villages in East Sikkim, through which a 3.5 km stretch of the 45 km long railway line has been planned, had not agreed to give their land for laying the track. The project cost has escalated from the estimated cost of Rs.13.4 billion in 2008

The Supreme Court of India approved the project in February 2016 with strict guidelines of the National Wildlife Board that cleared the project in June 2015 but ordered restricted speed, wireless animal tracking sensors and allowed digging of tunnels only during daytime. The railway line is needed for security and socio-economic reasons. The railway line will help troops and armaments move faster towards the Indo-Tibet border. Railway Board chairman visited and met the Northeast Frontier Railway (NFR) officials on 2 March 2018 to discuss the commencement of construction of the track and tunnels. The railway line up to Rangpo is expected to be completed in 2021. In the second phase the line will be extended up to Gangtok.

- Estimated cost: Rs.1,340 crore in 2008.
- Length of final alignment: 44.98 km
- Stations en route: Riang, Gailkhola, Tista Bazaar, Melli
- Nearest junction: New Jalpaiguri (30 km from Sevoke through Siliguri)
- Route under tunnels: 38.53 km (86%)
- Number of bridges: 28
- Number of tunnels: 14
- Longest tunnel: 5.1 km
