= North Eastern Railway Connectivity Project =

Railway connectivity project in India

North Eastern Railway Connectivity Project is an multi phased railway connectivity project in Northeast India which comprises states of Arunachal Pradesh, Assam, Manipur, Meghalaya, Mizoram, Nagaland, Tripura and Sikkim. These states come under Northeast Frontier Railway Zone of Indian Railways. This Railway project is considered as strategically important for India because it connects all the border states in this region and also close to ASEAN countries.

The Government of India has planned and projected to connect all 8 capitals of North Eastern states by 2030 As of September 2025, Four state capitals, Agartala in Tripura, Guwahati in Assam, Itanagar in Arunachal Pradesh and Aizawl in Mizoram are linked with railways; the rail projects to connect remaining 4 state capitals of Sikkim, Nagaland, Manipur and Meghalaya are underway.

== Background ==
The Northeast region is a strategically important area to counter China. These state are connected to India through the very narrow area of Siliguri Corridor. After China's claims over the Doklam area of Bhutan and India, it has become important for India to boost connectivity in this region.

The project PM Gati Shakti aims to boost connectivity across the country and to connect all the capitals of Indian states. Especially this region is considered as Gateway to Southeast Asia. Thus strategic railway lines is important for this region. The region currently has 6,829 km of rail network, mostly in the state of Assam.

The railway will also be used to develop tourism in this region. In 2023, various deluxe trains begans operations connecting major locations such as Kamakhya Temple in Guwahati (Assam), Kaziranga National Park in Assam, Unakoti in Tripura, Cherrapunji in Meghalaya, and Dimapur in Nagaland.

== List of Northeast India railway lines ==
=== By states ===
See map of under-construction rail lines in Northeast India.

- Railway in Arunachal Pradesh
- Railway in Assam
- Railway in Manipur
- Railway in Meghalaya
- Railway in Mizoram
- Railway in Nagaland
- Railway in Sikkim
- Railway in Tripura

=== Under construction ===
| Project | Location | States | Length (in Kilometre) | Notes |
|---|---|---|---|---|
| Murkongselek–Pasighat line | FromMurkongselek(AS) To Pasighat(AR) | Assam and Arunachal Pradesh | 26.15 | Likely completion by December 2026 for the remaining 10.55 km Sille-Pasighat section, Murkongselek-Sille Section has been commissioned on 13 Feb 2026. |
| Jiribam–Imphal line | From Jiribam, Jiribam district To Imphal, Imphal district | Manipur | 110.63 | Likely completion by December 2026. |
| Tetelia-Byrnihat line | From Tetelia(Guwahati), Kamrup district To Byrnihat, Ri-Bhoi district | Assam and Meghalaya | 22 | Likely completion by December 2026. |
| Sivok–Rangpo line | From Sivok, Darjeeling district(WB); To Rangpo, Pakyong district(SK) | West Bengal and Sikkim | 44.96 | Likely completion by December 2027. |
| Dhansiri–Zubza line | From Dhansiri(Dimapur), Dimapur district To Zubza,Kohima district | Nagaland | 82.5 | Likely completion by December 2028. |

=== Proposed ===
| Project | Location | States | Length (in kilometre) | Note | References |
|---|---|---|---|---|---|
| Bhalukpong–Tenga–Tawang line | From Bhalukpong, West Kameng district To Tawang, Tawang district | Arunachal Pradesh | 378 | | |
| North Lakhimpur–Bame–Silapathar line | From North Lakhimpur, Lakhimpur district(AS) Via Aalo and Bame, West Siang district(AR) To Silapathar, Dhemaji district(AS) | Assam and Arunachal Pradesh | 247.85 | | |
| Pasighat–Tezu–Rupai line | From Rupai, Tinsukia district(AS) Via Tezu, Lohit district(AR) To Pasighat, East Siang district(AR) | Assam and Arunachal Pradesh | 227 | | |
| Imphal–Moreh line | From Imphal, Imphal district To Moreh, Tengnoupal district | Manipur | 111 | | |
| Byrnihat-Shillong line | From Byrnihat, Ri-Bhoi district To Shillong, East Khasi Hills district | Meghalaya | 108 | | |
| Sairiang-Hmawngbuchhuah line | From Sairang, Aizawl district To Hmawngbuchhuah, Lawngtlai district | Mizoram | 223 | | |
| Rangpo-Gangtok line | From Rangpo, Pakyong district To Gangtok, Gangtok district | Sikkim | 44 | It will be the second phase of Sivok-Ranhpo line and which will be the last state capital to be connected via a railway line | |

== Rail link to neighbouring countries ==
=== Trans–Asian railway ===
In Northeast India, the government is developing multiple railway projects to connect the region with the Trans-Asian Railway (TAR). A key project is the 118-km railway line from Imphal in Manipur to Moreh on the Myanmar border, aimed at improving access to the TAR. Additionally, a route from Tripura to Bangladesh is proposed to enhance the region's integration into the TAR network.

=== India–Bangladesh rail link ===
The Government of two countries signed MoU for railway project linking Akhaurah, Bangladesh and Agartala of Tripura, India. The project was expected to be completed in mid-2023. NFR also conducted surveys for Belonia-Chittagong rail link.

=== India-Bhutan rail link ===
See rail transport in Bhutan.

=== India-Myanmar rail link ===
See India-Myanmar rail links.

=== India-Nepal rail link ===
See India-Nepal rail links.

== See also ==
- Northeast India
  - Northeast Connectivity projects
  - BCIM Economic Corridor
  - List of bridges on Brahmaputra River
- India-China
  - Geostrategic railways under-construction in India
  - India-China Border Roads
  - China–India railway
- Others
  - List of megaprojects in India
  - Asian Highway Network
