= China–India railway =

China–India Railway

Overview
- Native name: 中印铁路
- Status: Planned
- Termini: Yadong; Shigatse

Technical
- Line length: 460 km

China–India Railway or Sino Indian Railway (Chinese: 中印铁路) are a number of planned railways between China and India:

- Shigatse-Yadong-Sikkim line: Most advanced in implementation, technically not entering India yet still bearing the name, 460 km standard gauge 120-160 km/h railway to link Yadong on Indo-Chinese border with current railhead Shigatse Railway Station, Tibet, and possibly onward with break of gauge (broad gauge) and continuing to Sikkim and beyond, subject to the India-China geopolitics. Trans-shipment land ports are proposed. This line may share a good part of its routing with China-Nepal railway towards Gyirong and Kathmandu. Following 2020 China–India skirmishes, China seems keen to hasten Tibet rail projects. The Indian government is constructing the Sivok–Rangpo line which will be extended up to the border till Nathu La.

- Kunming-Ruili-Myitkyina-Ledo line: A separate line would begin in Kunming in China, through Ruili and Myitkyina in Myanmar, and end in Ledo in India. The 160 km/h standard gauge Kunmin-Ruili Station section, called Dali–Ruili railway, was under-construction in 2024. While its extension to India is yet to be formally approved. Myanmar has expressed interest to extend a spur from Ruili to Mandalay.
- Few more abstract proposals for rail tracks for high speed trains between China and India have been proposed without feasibility study.

== See also ==
- China–Nepal railway
- Sivok–Rangpo line
- Indian geostrategic rail lines
- Sichuan–Tibet railway (Lhasa–Nyingchi railway) - passes within 50km of border with India
- India–China Border Roads
- India-China border infrastructure
- North Eastern Railway Connectivity Project
