= Majitar =

Majhitar
- Urban Village Ward No.1 of Rangpo Municipality (Nagar Panchayat) in East Sikkim.
- Location within Sikkim Location within India
- Coordinates: 27.1894°N 88.4978°E
- Country: India
- State: Sikkim
- District: Pakyong District
- Elevation: 200 m (656 ft)

Language
  - Official: Nepali (Gorkha), Lepcha, Limbu, Bhutia, Newari, Rai, Gurung, Mangar, Sherpa, Tamang and Sunwar
- Time zone: UTC+5:30 (IST)
- Postal code: 737136
- Vehicle registration: SK 08/SK 01/SK 07
- Climate: Cwa
- Lok Sabha constituency: Sikkim Constituency
- Vidhan Sabha constituency: West Pendam Constituency
- Nearest City: Gangtok
- Website: eastsikkim.nic.in

Majitar is the fastest growing urban village in Pakyong District in the Indian state of Sikkim. The nearest towns are Rangpo (4 kilometres (2.5 mi) away) and Singtam (7 kilometres (4.3 mi)).

Sikkim Manipal Institute of Technology Gate, Majitar Pakyong District Sikkim

== Location ==
It is about 200 metres (660 ft) above sea level giving it a sub-tropical climate. Majitar lies on the National Highway 10 connecting Siliguri and Gangtok. Sikkim Manipal Institute of Technology campus lies in Majitar and Rangpo railway station lies in Khanikhola, Majitar.

== Demographics ==
Majitar has a large population of Sikkimese Nepalese, Sikkimese Bhutia, Marwari and Bengali people. Although there are students from all over the country, mainly those from Bihar, Uttar Pradesh, Jharkhand and Guwahati live at and Sikkim Manipal Institute of Technology, Himalayan Pharmacy Institute Sikkimese Nepali is the predominant language but because of the presence of student from all over the country, people speak Hindi too.

== Geography ==
Majitar is located at 27.1894°N 88.4978°E. It lies on the bank of River Teesta.

== Transport ==
As Majitar lies on National Highway 10, frequent taxis are available towards many towns and cities of Sikkim and West Bengal. SNT buses connecting Gangtok to Sikkim Nationalised Transport Bus Terminus (Siliguri), and private and NBSTC buses connecting Gangtok to Tenzing Norgay Bus Terminus (Siliguri) are frequently available from Majitar.

== New Sikkim Railway Project ==
- Sikkim Railway Link

A rail link from Sevoke to Rangpo railway station, Khanikhola, Majitar is under construction.

- Rail Budget 2010 also in Rail budget 2010-11 further extension to Gangtok has been announced.

== See also ==
- East Sikkim district
- Singtam
- Rangpo
