= Melli =

Melli Melli Bazaar
- Town
- Location of Melli in Sikkim Melli (India)
- Coordinates: 27.0906°N 88.4561°E
- Country: India
- State: Sikkim
- District: Namchi

Languages
- Time zone: UTC+5:30 (IST)
- Postal code: 737128
- Vehicle registration: SK

Melli (also spelled Malli) is a town on the West Bengal-Sikkim border near the River Teesta. The town consists of two markets, one lying on NH10 in Kalimpong district of West Bengal and the other in Namchi district of Sikkim. Melli Railway Station of Sevoke-Rangpo Railway Line lies in the Kalimpong district part of Melli.

Melli in the Nepali language means "the place where the dead are cremated". Melli is one of the few towns in India that lies in two different states Kalimpong district of West Bengal and Namchi district of Sikkim. The Jawaharlal Nehru Bridge connects the two parts of the town. It is the second longest bridge in Sikkim after IBM Bridge at Rangpo River in Rangpo. The part of the town in West Bengal is also called as Melli Bazaar. The West Bengal portion of the town lies on National Highway 10 connecting Siliguri to Gangtok. Melli is the main entry point for West and South Sikkim districts. Kalimpong town lies 20 kilometres (12 mi) away from Melli.

The town lies at an elevation of about 100 metres (330 ft). It is located 7 kilometres (4.3 mi) upstream from Teesta Bazaar. On the Sikkim side lies Yuksom Breweries which produces most of the beer in the region. The brewery and a biscuit factory are the major industries in the region. River rafting can also be undertaken from this point.

Melli Bazar on the Sikkim side is one of the 31 constituencies of the Sikkim Legislative Assembly.
