= Pakyong district =

District in Sikkim, India

- District of Sikkim
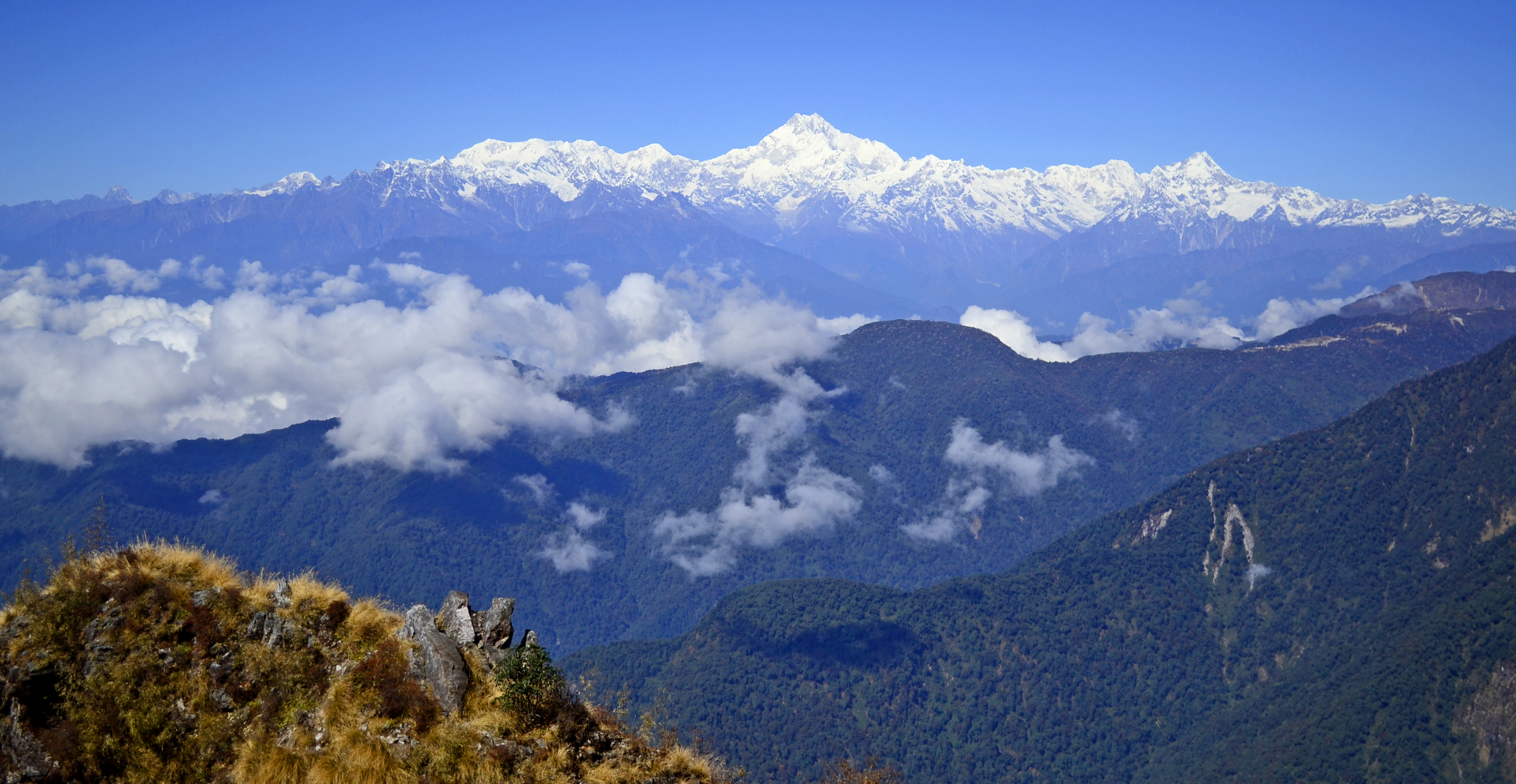
- Mt. Kangchenjunga view from Thambi View Point, Dzuluk, Pakyong District Sikkim.
- Pakyong district Location in Sikkim
- Coordinates: 27°23′N 88°59′E
- Country: India
- State: Sikkim
- Headquarters: Pakyong

Government
  - District magistrate: Ms. Pari Bishnoi
  - Lok Sabha constituencies: Sikkim Constituency
  - Vidhan Sabha constituencies: Rhenock; Chujachen; West Pendam; Gnathang Machong; Namcheybong

Area
  - Total: 404 km^{2} (156 sq mi)
- Elevation: 1,120 m (3,670 ft)

Population (2011)
  - Total: 74,583
  - Density: 185/km^{2} (478/sq mi)
- Time zone: UTC+05:30 (IST)
- ISO 3166 code: IN-SK
- Vehicle registration: SK-07
- Major Highways: NH 717A; NH 10; NH 717B,
- Longest Bridge: Atal Setu Bridge, Rangpo
- Largest Stadium: Mining Cricket Stadium, Rangpo
- Largest Wildlife Sanctuary: Pangolakha Wildlife Sanctuary
- Website: pakyongdistrict.nic.in

Pakyong district is a district in the Indian state of Sikkim, administered from Pakyong. The district was formed in 2021 from three former subdivisions of the East Sikkim district, viz., Pakyong Subdivision, Rangpo Subdivision and Rongli Subdivision. The remaining Gangtok Subdivision of the former district was named as the Gangtok district, which now bounds the Pakyong district in the northwest. In addition, the district is now bounded by the Kalimpong district of West Bengal, Bhutan, Tibet and the Namchi district of Sikkim.

== Demographics ==
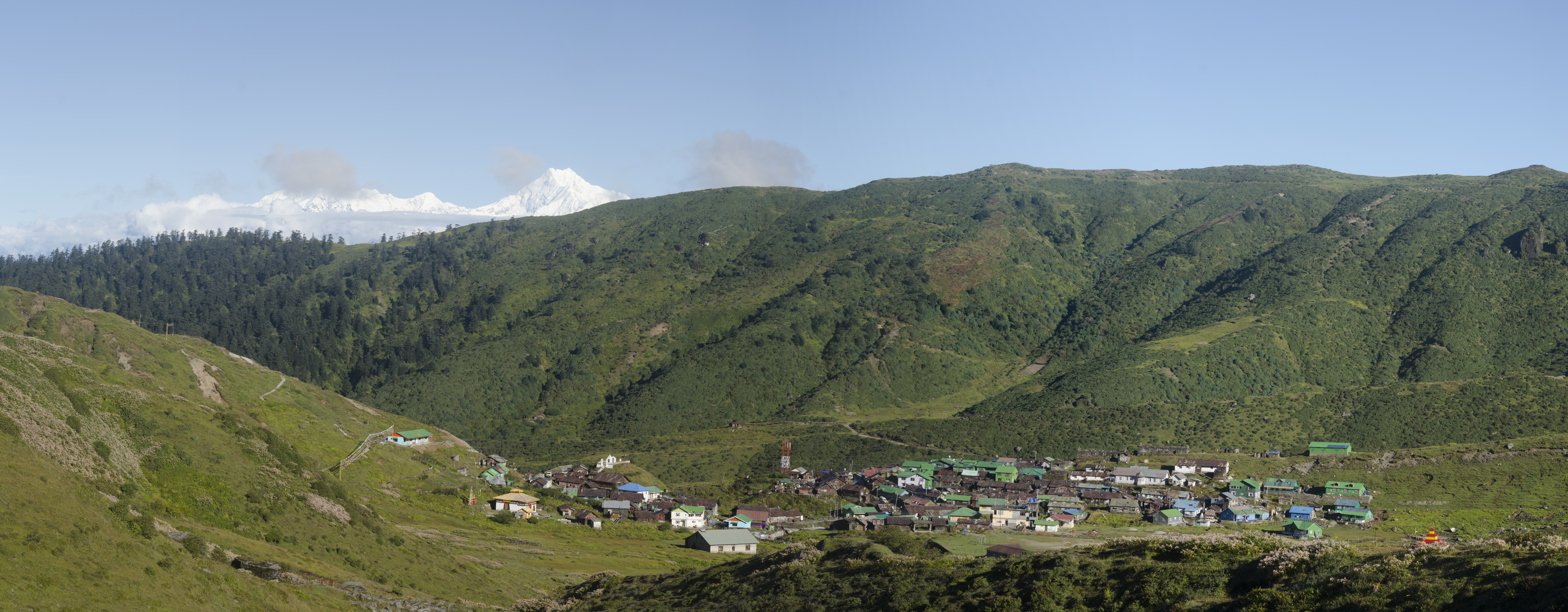
Nathang Valley Pakyong District Sikkim

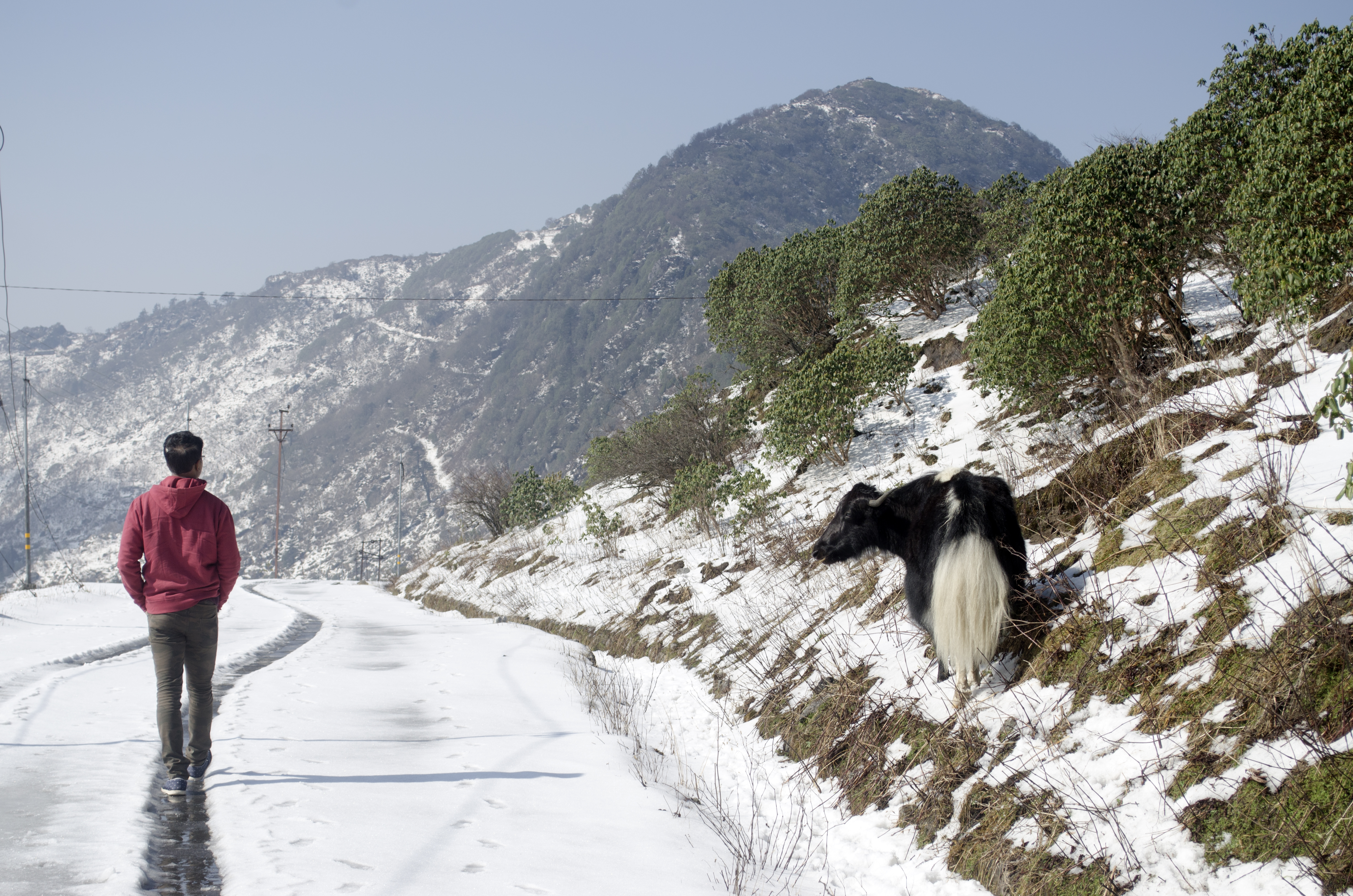
Snow on Sikkim Silk Route, Pakyong District Sikkim

Pakyong District has the total area of 404 km^{2} (156 sq mi). The total population as per 2011 census is 74,583.

== Transport ==
=== Roadways ===
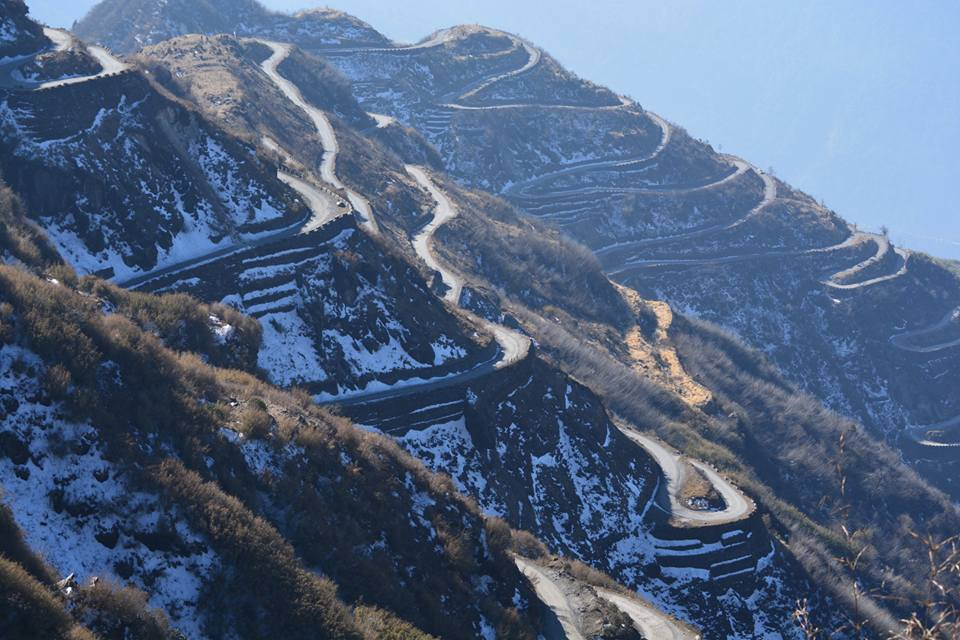
National Highway 717B (India) switchbacks at Zuluk, Pakyong District Sikkim

The major highways in Pakyong District are as follows:

- National Highway 10 connecting Siliguri to Gangtok, lies in Pakyong District from Rangpo to Singtam via Majitar.
- National Highway-717A connecting Bagrakote to Gangtok, lies in the Pakyong District from Reshi, Rhenock to Setipool near Ranipool via Rorathang and Pakyong.
- National Highway-717B connecting Rhenock and Menla, Sherathang via Zuluk and Rongli lies mostly in Pakyong District.
- Atal Setu Bridge, the longest roadway bridge of sikkim connecting Pakyong District with Kalimpong district of West Bengal lies in Pakyong District.

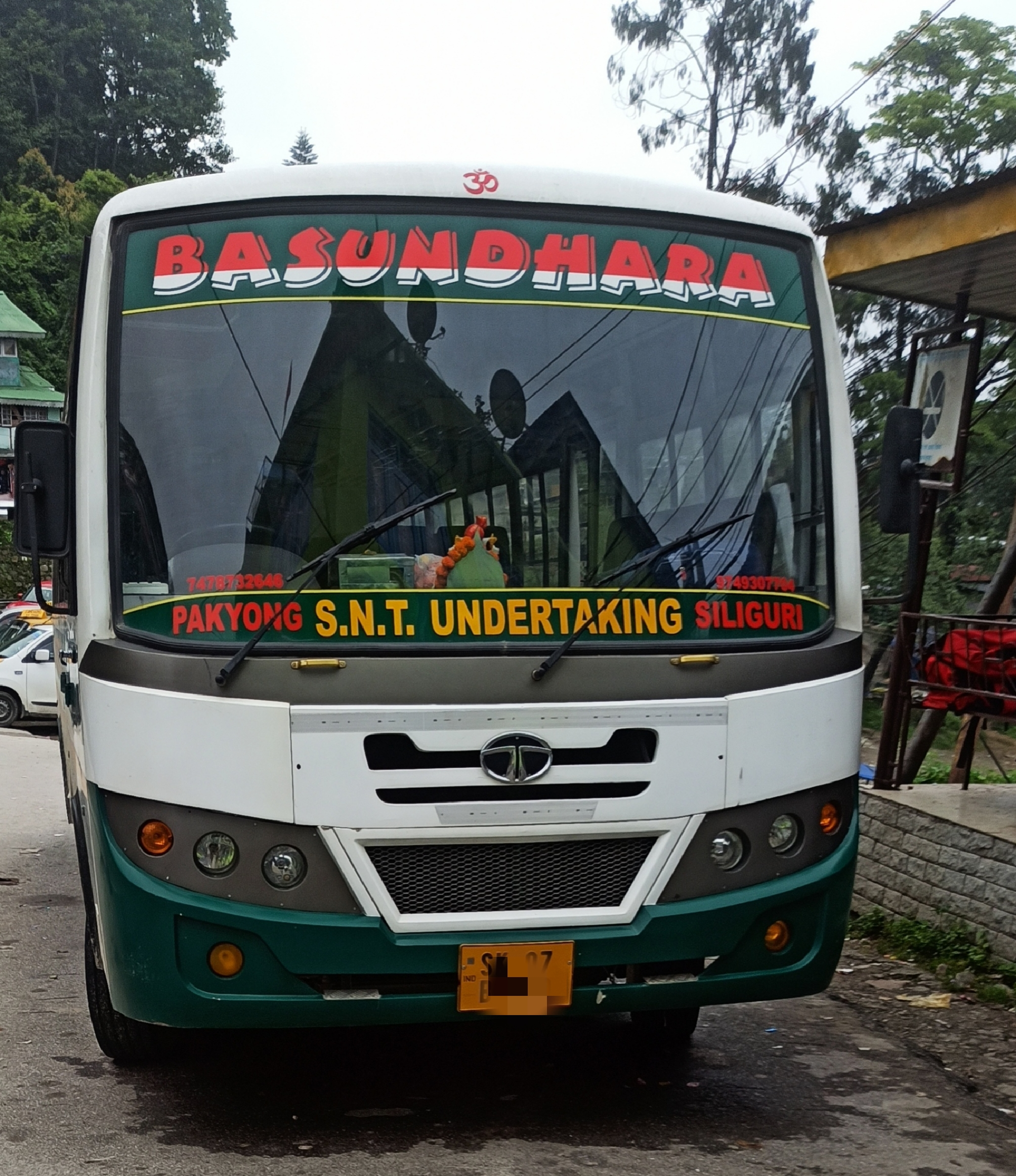
Pakyong to Siliguri SNT Bus

=== Railway ===
The under construction Sivok–Rangpo railway line will end in Pakyong District at the town of Rangpo. It is planned later to be prolonged to Gangtok.

=== Airways ===
Pakyong Greenfield Airport the only airport of Sikkim, lies on Pakyong District at the district Headquarter-Pakyong.

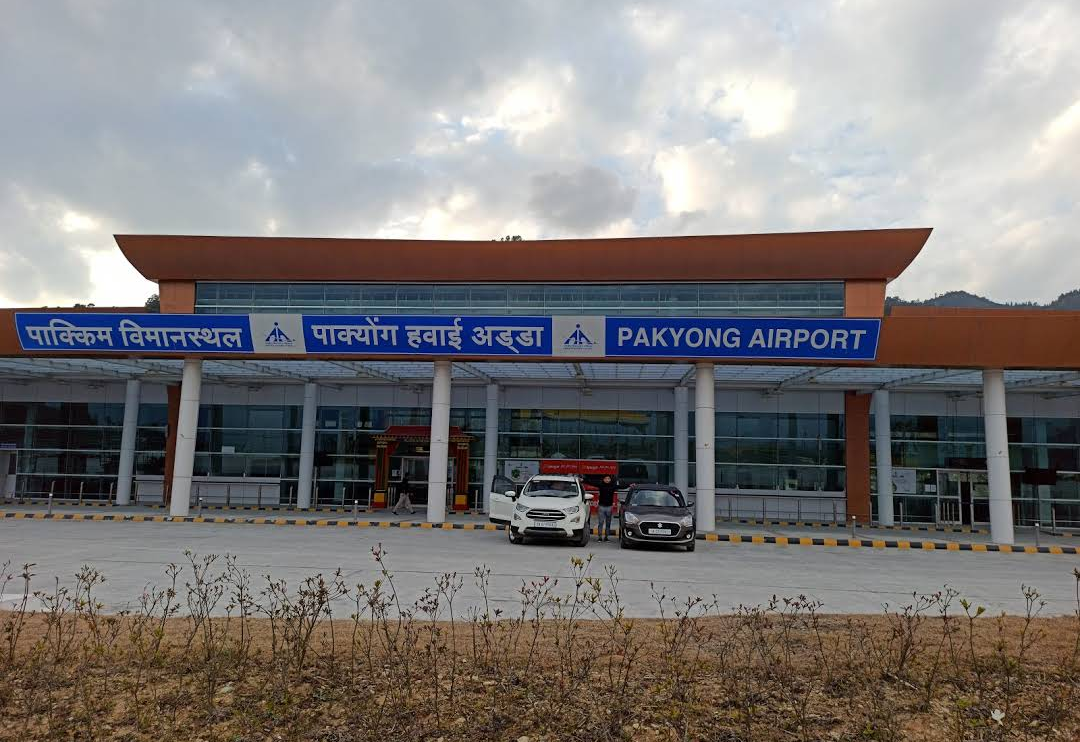
Pakyong Airport, Pakyong District, Sikkim

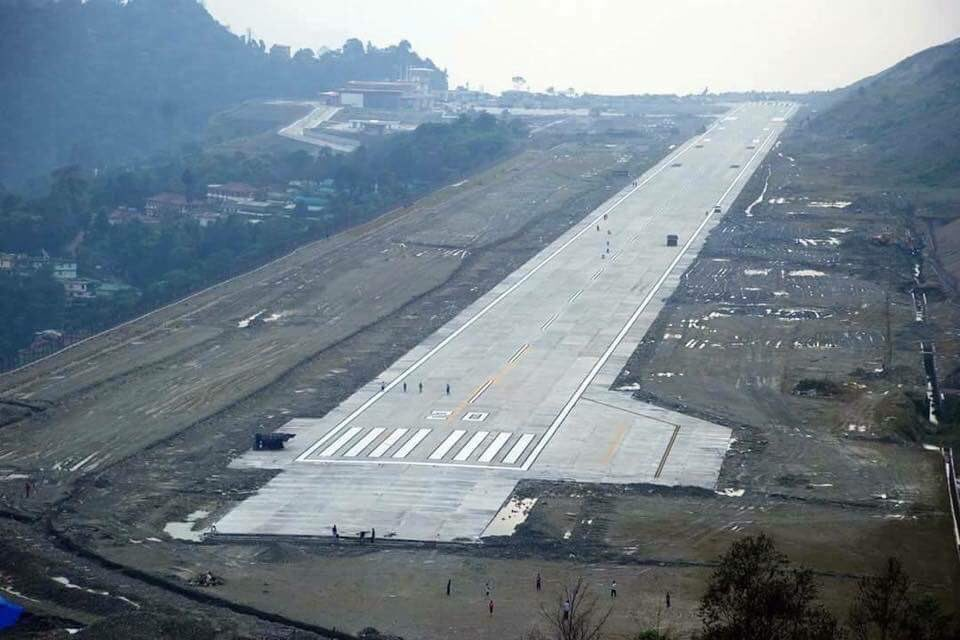
Runway at Pakyong Airport, Pakyong District Sikkim

== Assembly Constituencies ==
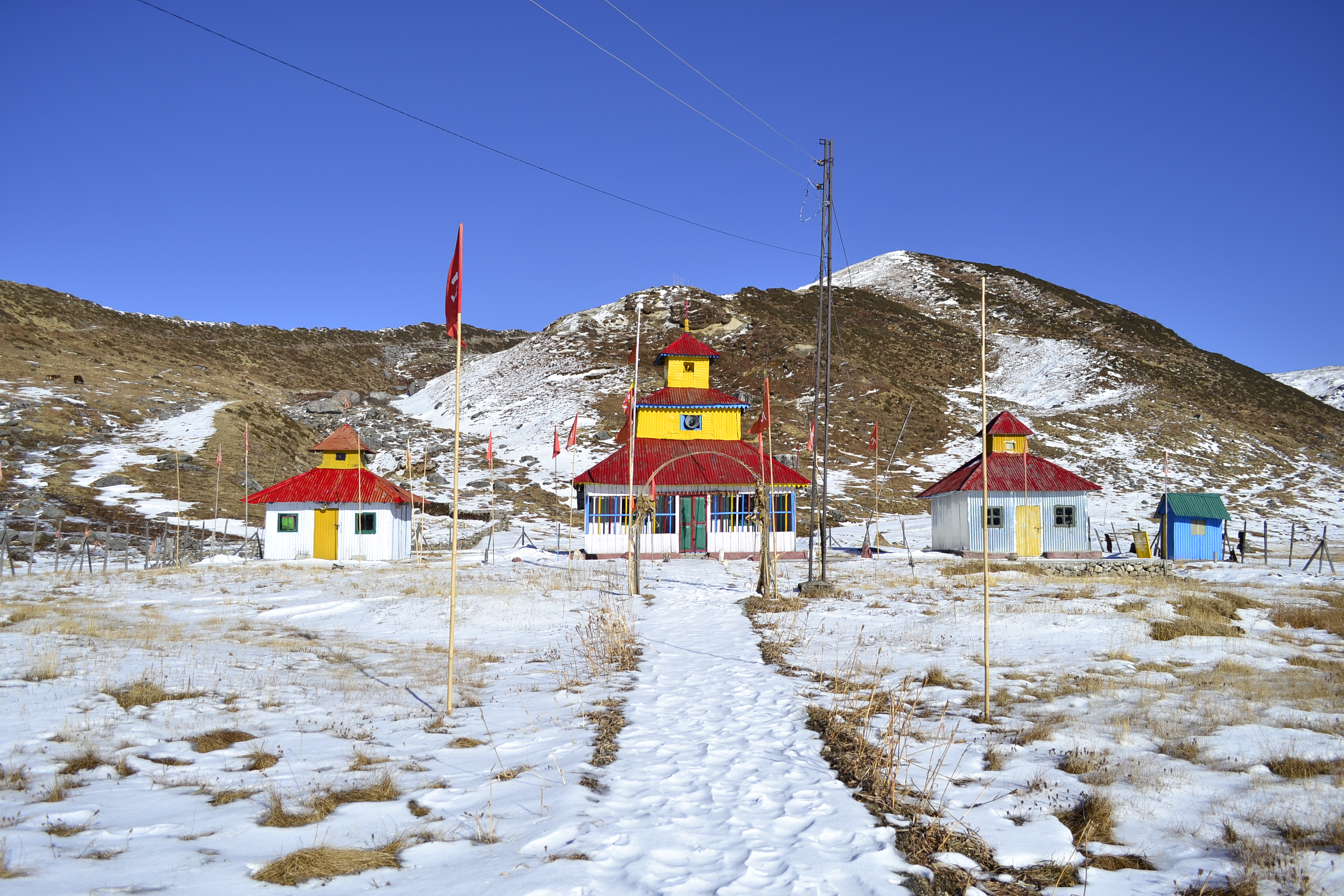
Gnathang Krishna Mandir Pakyong District Sikkim

Assembly Constituencies falling under Pakyong District are as follows:

- Rhenock (Vidhan Sabha constituency)
- Chujachen (Vidhan Sabha constituency)
- West Pendam (Vidhan Sabha constituency)
- Gnathang-Machong (Vidhan Sabha constituency) and
- Namchaybong (Vidhan Sabha constituency)

== Important Towns and Cities ==
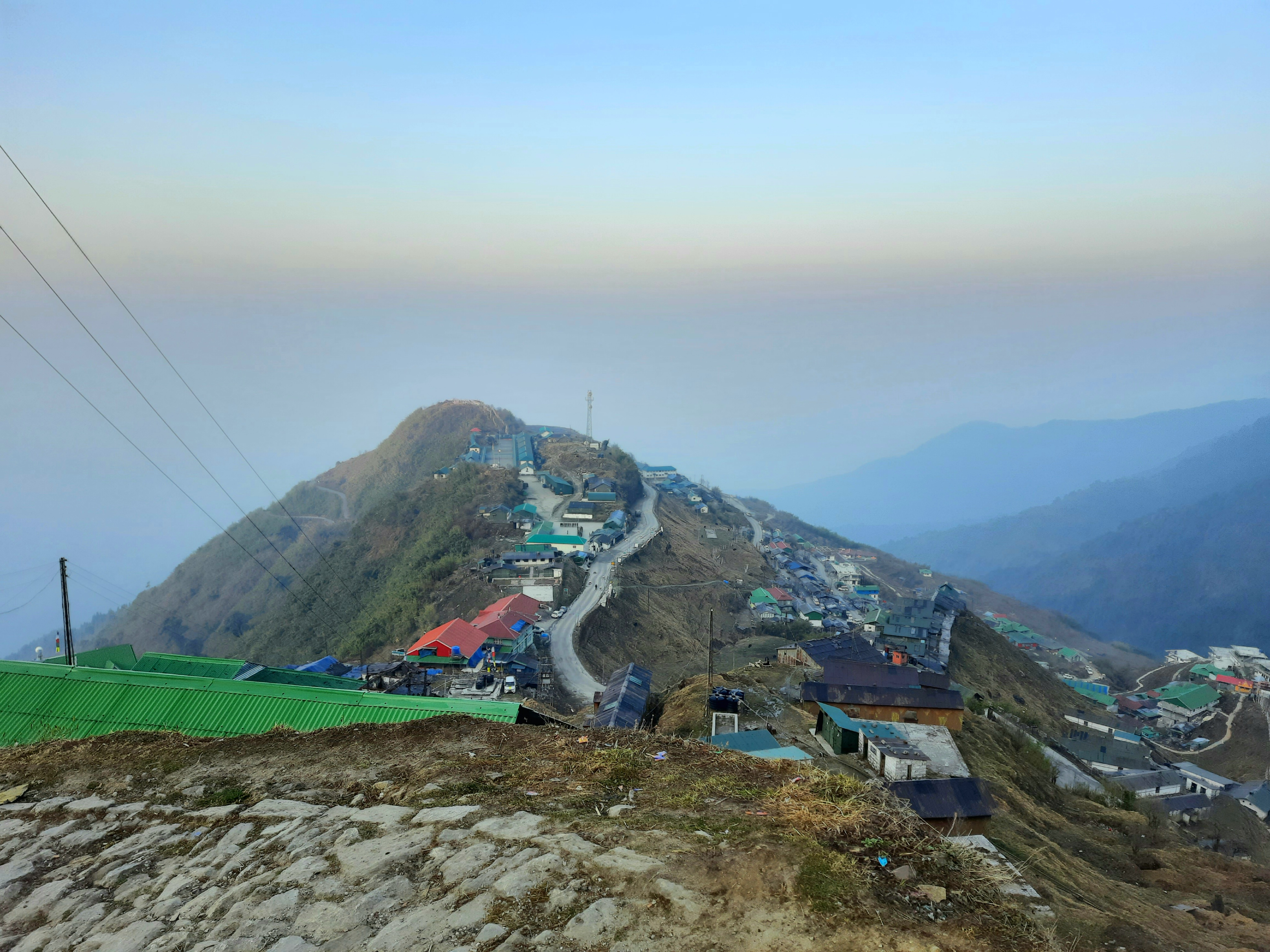
Dzuluk, an important tourist destination, Pakyong District Sikkim

The major towns and cities of Pakyong District are

- Pakyong
- Rangpo
- Rorathang
- Rhenock
- Rongli
- Majitar
- Kumrek

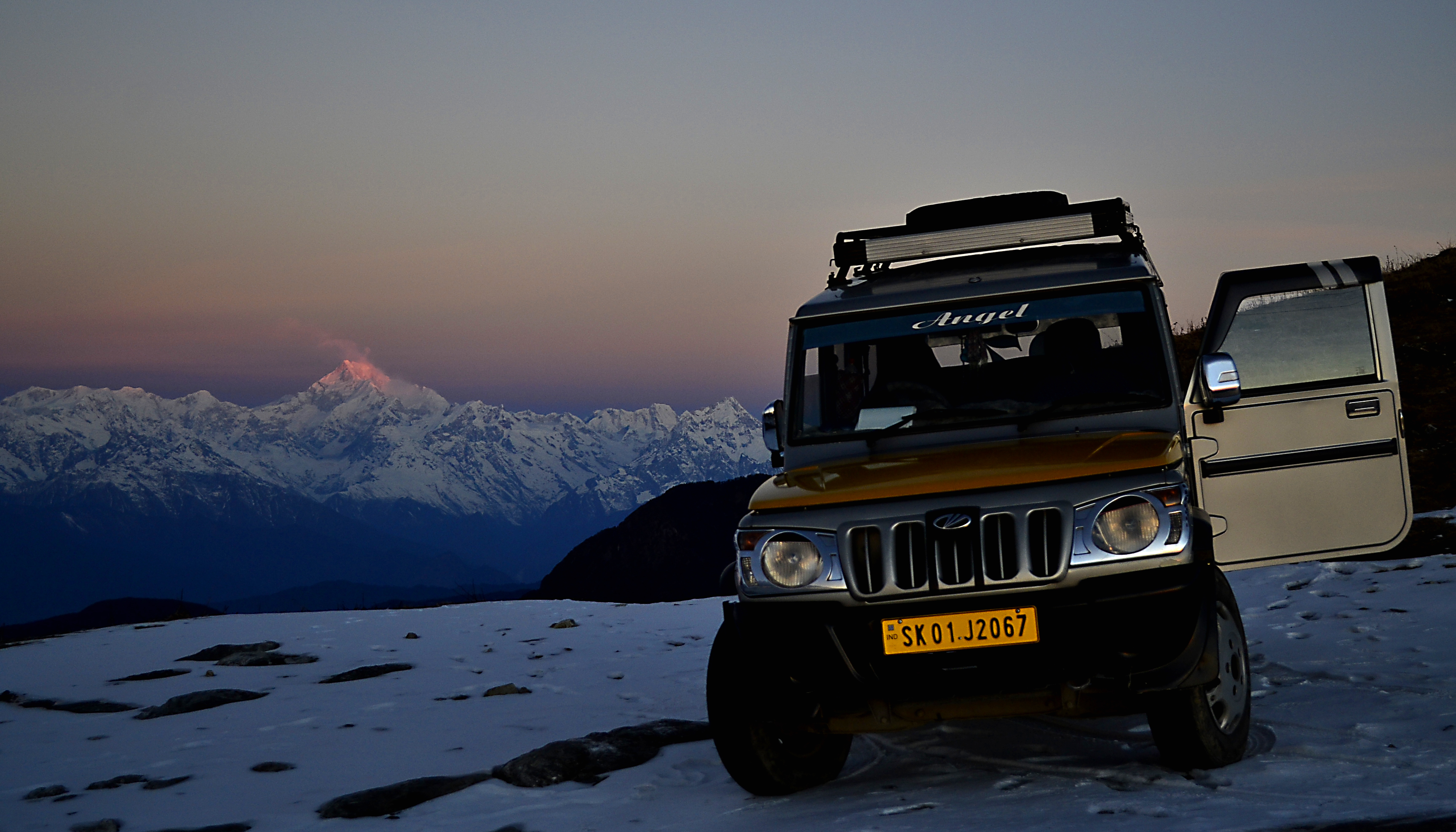
Sunrise from Lungthung View Point, Pakyong District Sikkim

== Wildlife Sanctuaries ==
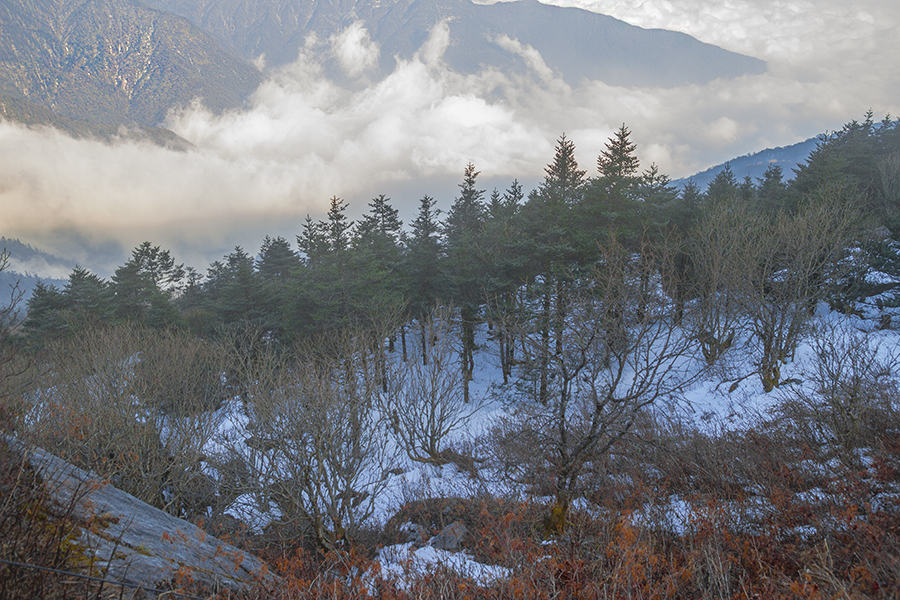
Diverse flora of Pangolakha Wildlife Sanctuary, Pakyong District, Sikkim

Pangolakha Wildlife Sanctuary lies in the Pakyong District. It is connected to Neora Valley National Park of Kalimpong district of North Bengal via thick forest cover in Aritar Mulkharka Rachela region. Sumin Reserve Forest and Saramsa Garden also lies in Pakyong District which is rich in varieties of floral plants and fauna.

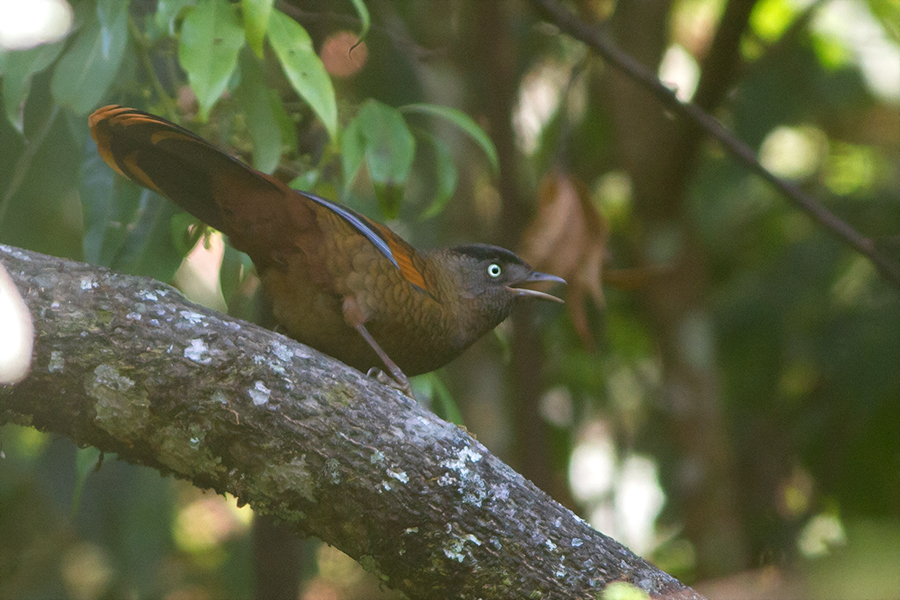
Blue-winged Laughingthrush in Pangolakha Wildlife Sanctuary Pakyong District Sikkim

== Flora and fauna ==
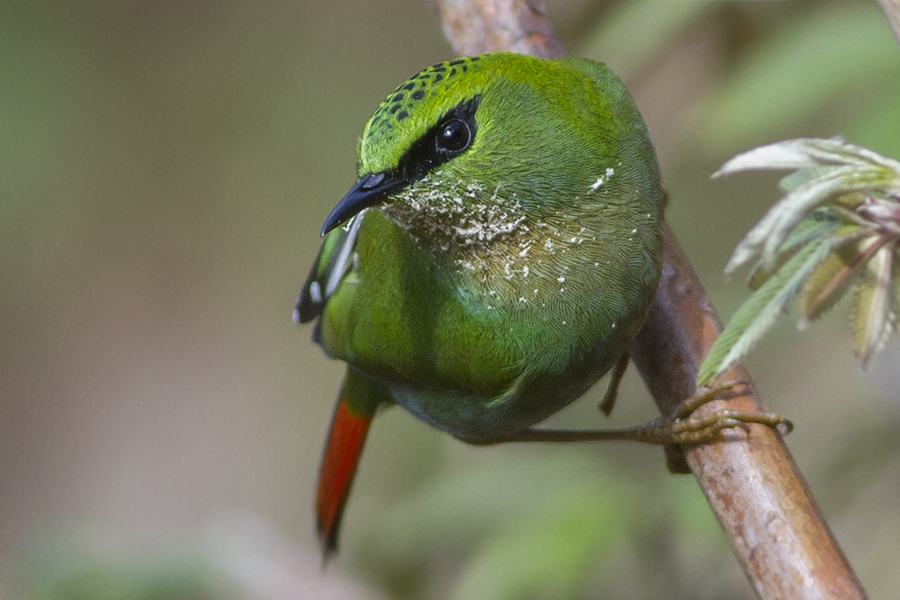
Fire-tailed myzornis at Pangolakha Wildlife Sanctuary

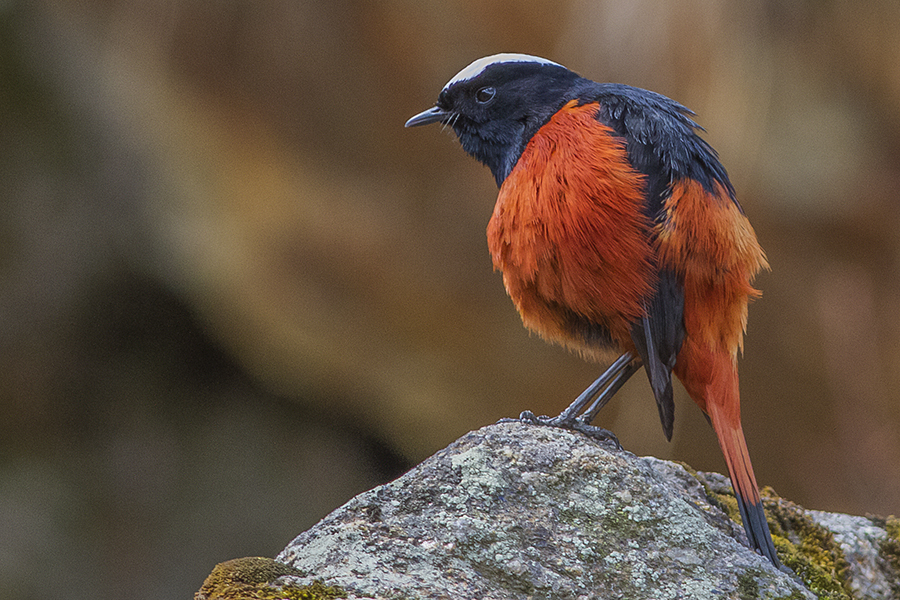
White-capped redstart at Lingtam Pakyong District Sikkim

Variety of plants and wildlife are found in Pakyong District. The important ones are red panda the state animal, blood pheasant the state bird Dendrobium nobile the state flower and Rhododendron the state tree are found in the wildlife sanctuaries of Pakyong District.

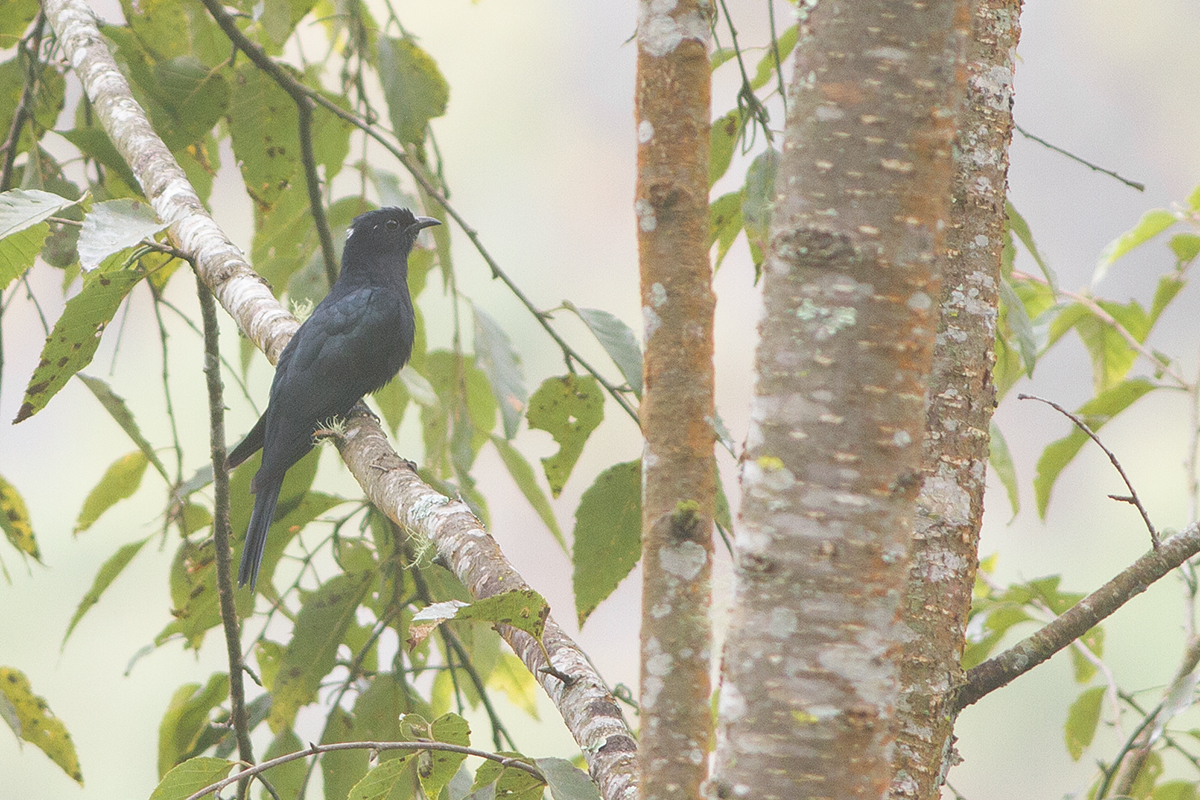
Drongo Cuckoo in Budang, Sumin Reserve Forest Pakyong District Sikkim

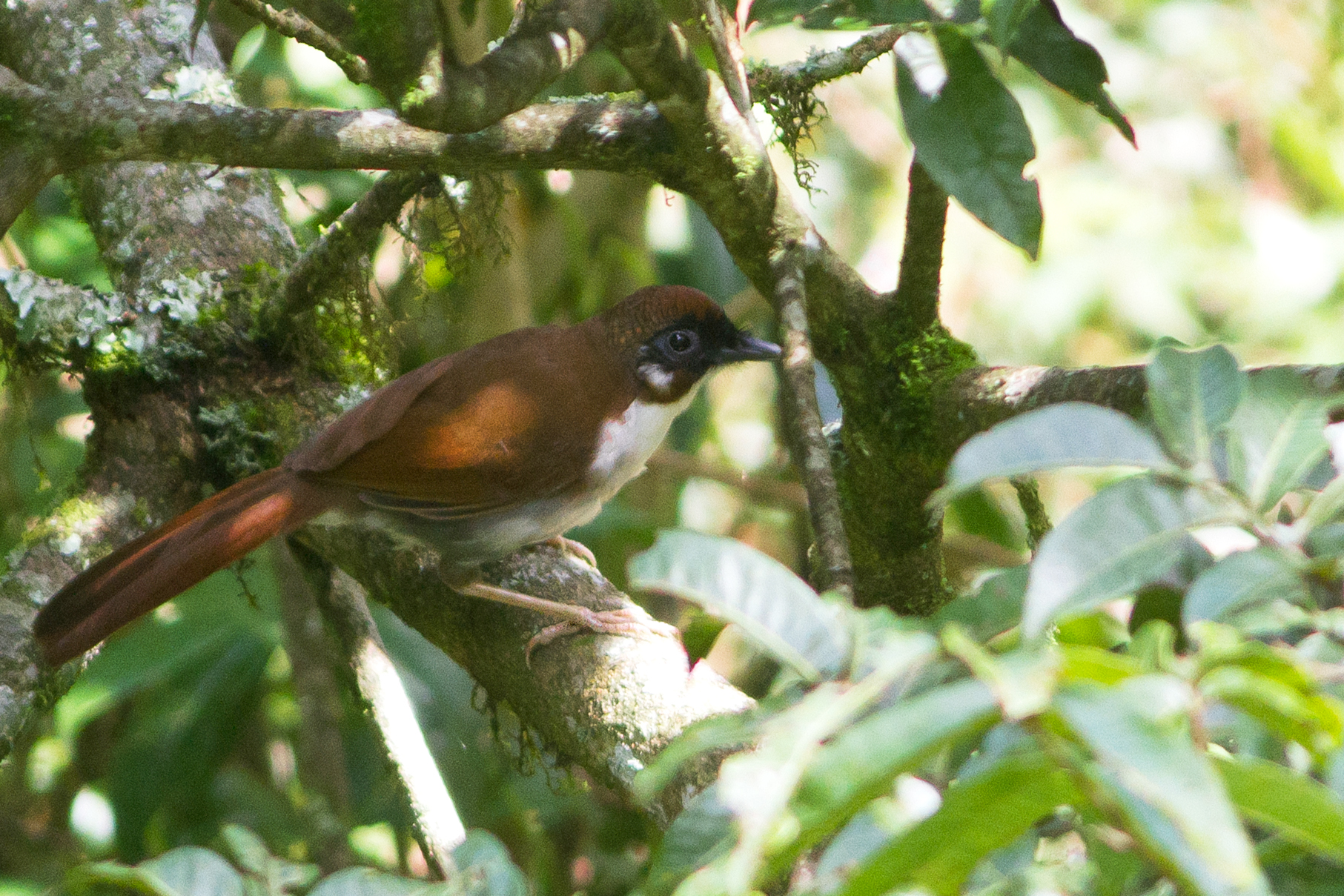
Grey-sided laughingthrush at Pendam, Sumin Reserve Forest, Pakyong District Sikkim

Other important wild animals include Snow Leopard, Himalayan black bear, Clouded leopard, Large Indian civet etc. Forest Department, Government of Sikkim has also confirmed the presence of Royal Bengal Tiger in the Pangolakha Wildlife Sanctuary of Pakyong District in January 2019.

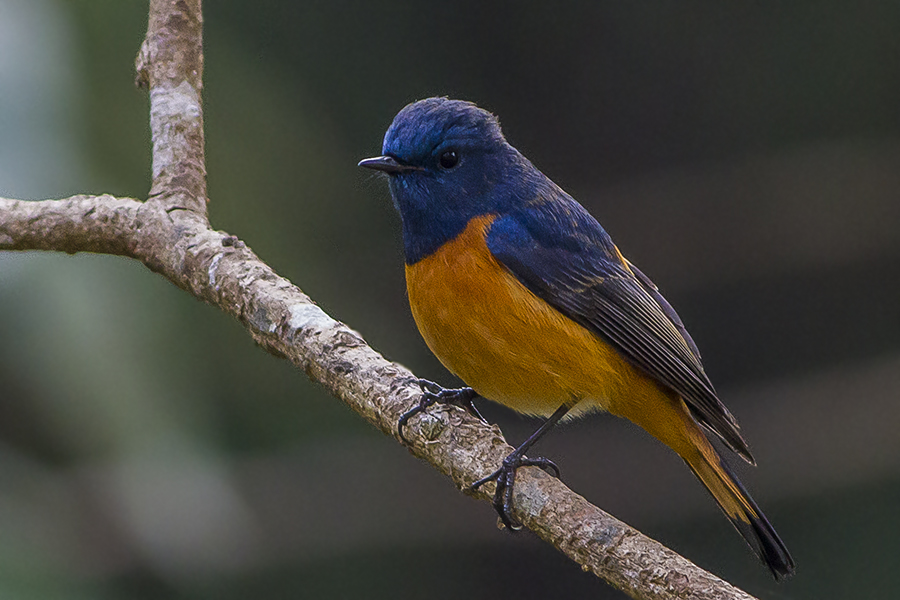
Blue-fronted redstart at Rolep Pakyong District Sikkim

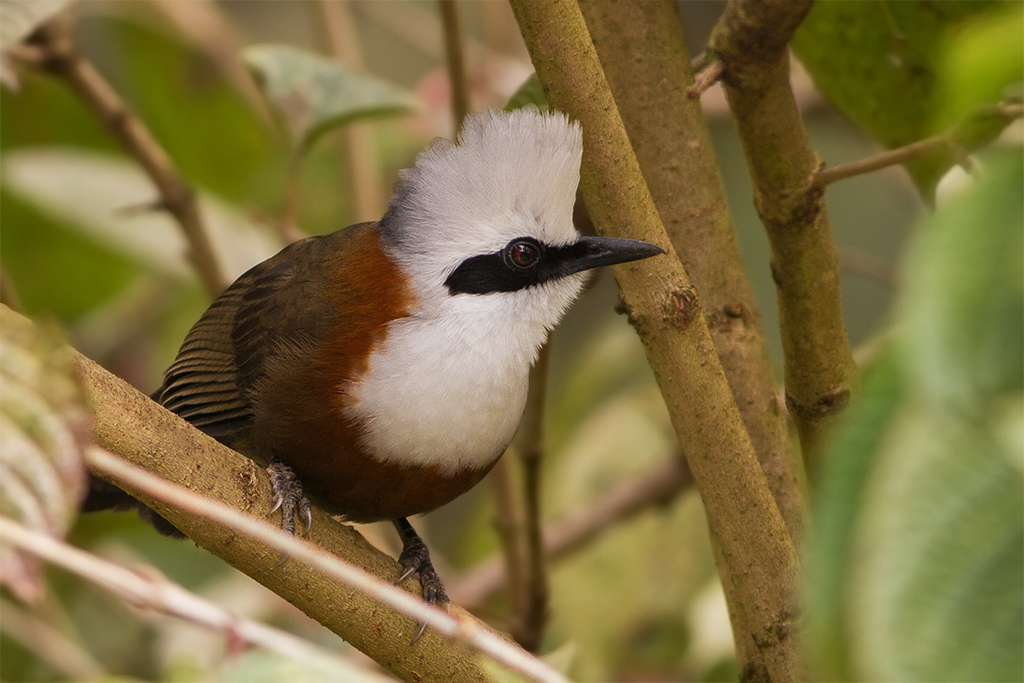
White-crested laughingthrush at Aritar Pakyong District Sikkim

== Rivers and Lakes ==
=== Rivers ===
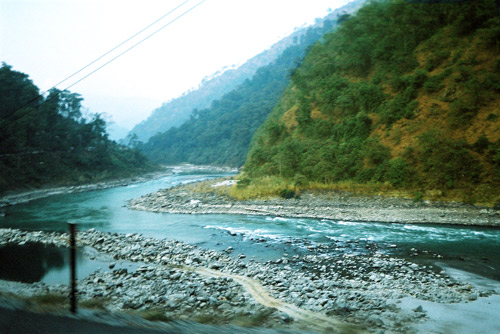
Teesta River near Majitar, Pakyong District Sikkim

River Teesta, the largest river of state flows in Pakyong district from Singtam to Rangpo.

Rangpo River the third largest river of Sikkim originates from Lake Menmecho at Rongli Subdivision of Pakyong District and flows through Pakyong Subdivision and Rongli Subdivision villages and towns of Pakyong District before meeting river Teesta at Rangpo Town.

River Jaldhaka which originates near Dzuluk in Pakyong District and flows towards Bhutan, West Bengal and Bangladesh.

Other major rivers of Pakyong District are Richu Khola, Rongli Khola, Pachey Khola, Reshi Khola etc.

=== Lakes ===
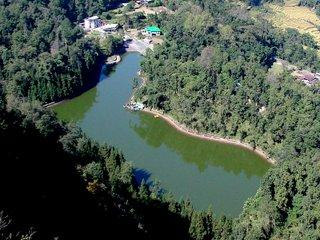
Lampokhari (lake) of Aritar, Pakyong District Sikkim

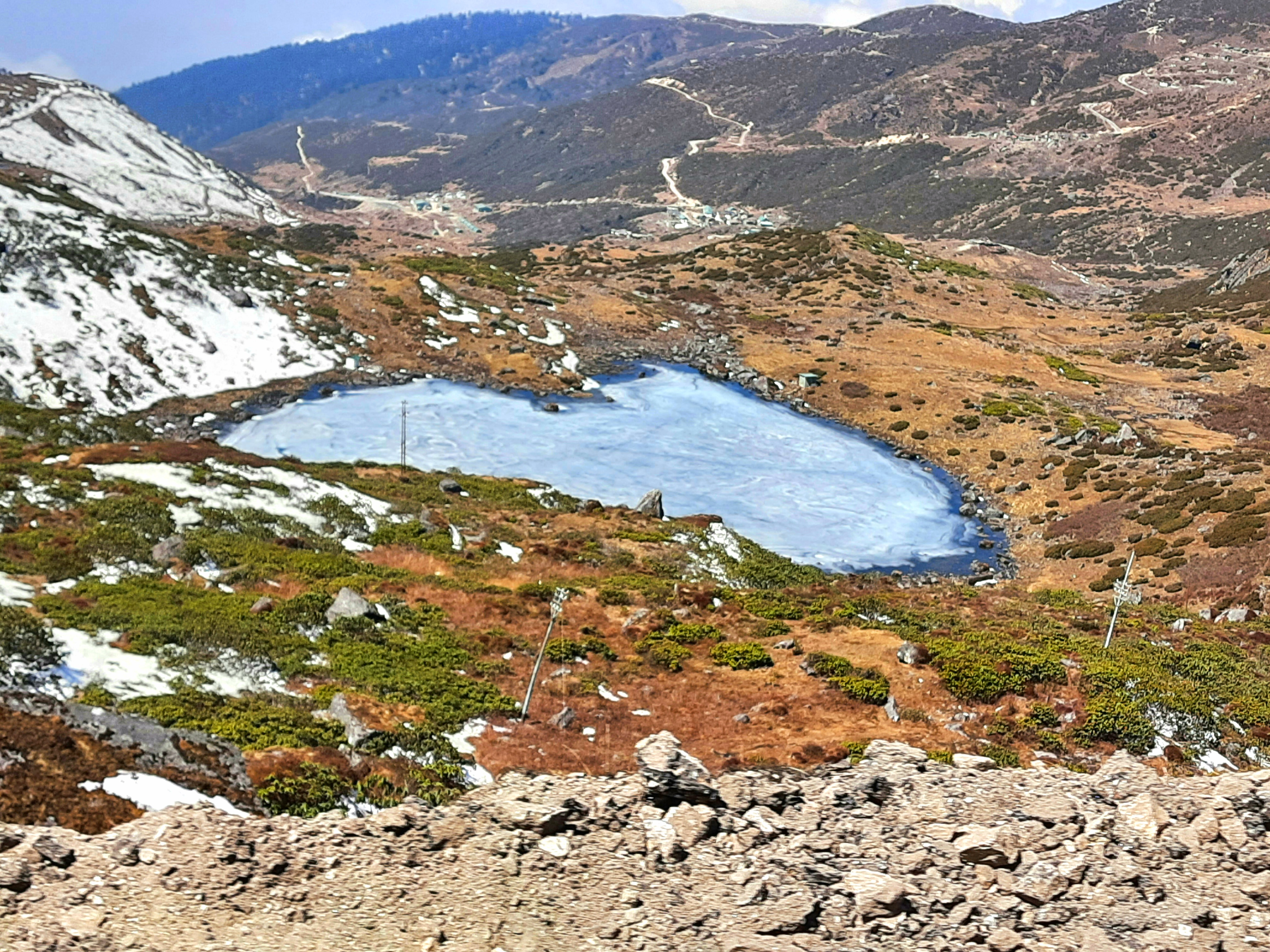
Gnathang Heart Lake, Gnathang Pakyong District Sikkim

Important lakes of Pakyong District are :

- Lampokhari, Aritar
- Gnathang Heart Lake
- Rangpo Dam lake Below Rolep.
- Mulkharka Lake (lies in sikkim-west bengal border).

== Sports ==
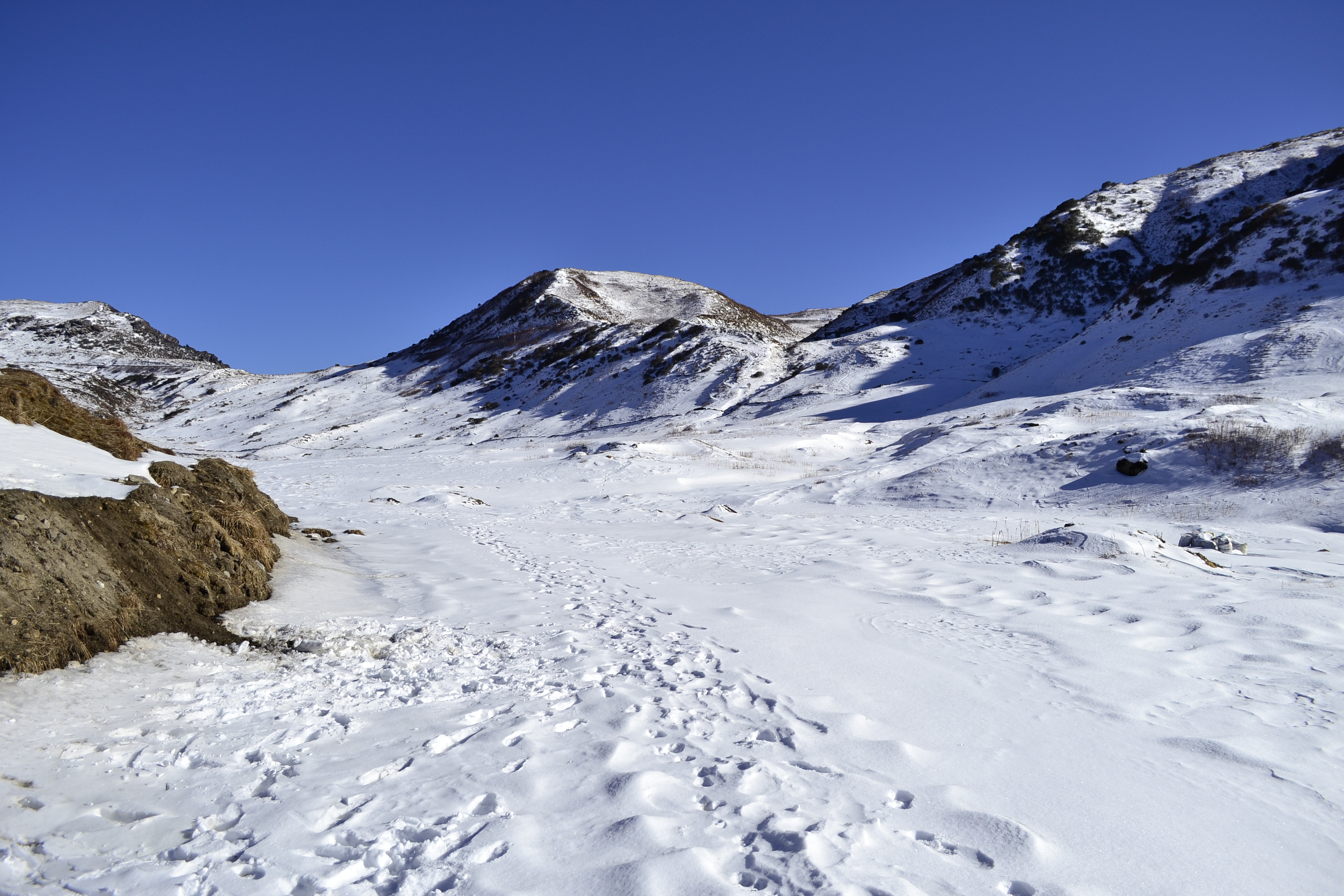
Gnathang Valley Pakyong District Sikkim during Winters perfect for Snowboarding

Mining Cricket Stadium located at Rangpo, Pakyong district is the largest cricket stadium of entire Sikkim. The stadium belongs to Sikkim Cricket Association and hosts important cricket tournaments like Ranji Trophy, CK Nayudu Trophy, Cooch Behar Trophy, Vijay Merchant Trophy etc.It is the home ground of Sikkim cricket team. Other major sports grounds of Pakyong district are St. Xavier's Football ground - Pakyong, Rongli Mela Ground, Rhenock SSS Ground, Chujachen SSS Ground, Central Pendam SSS Ground etc.

== Education ==
Sikkim Manipal Institute of Technology Gate, Majitar Pakyong District Sikkim

Pakyong District has many educational institutions. Some important ones among them are as follows:

- Sikkim Manipal Institute of Technology, Majitar.
- Pakim Palatine College, Pakyong.
- Government Degree College, Rhenock.
- Advance Technical Training Centre, Bardang.
- Himalayan Pharmacy Institute, Majitar.
- Government Industrial Training Institute, Mining.
- National Institute of Electronics & Information Technology, Pacheykhani.
- Eklavya Model Residential School, Thekabong.
- Jawahar Navodaya Vidyalaya, Pakyong

== Achievements ==
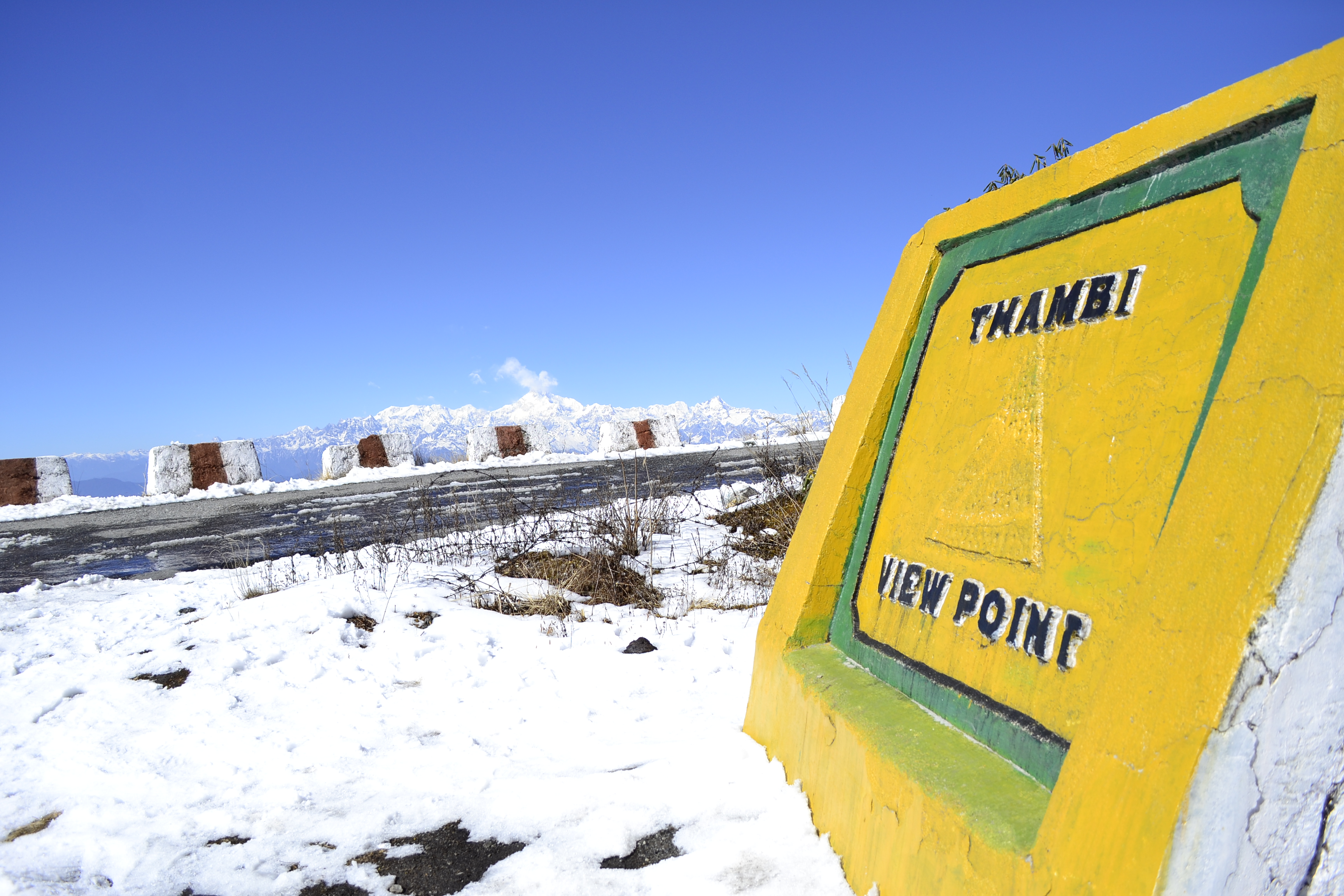
Thambi View Point Dzuluk, Pakyong District Sikkim

- Pakyong District of Sikkim achieved the 𝟖𝐭𝐡 𝐫𝐚𝐧𝐤 𝐚𝐦𝐨𝐧𝐠𝐬𝐭 𝟕𝟓 𝐝𝐢𝐬𝐭𝐫𝐢𝐜𝐭𝐬 𝐨𝐟 𝐈𝐧𝐝𝐢𝐚 which were selected for 𝐭𝐡𝐞 𝐀𝐳𝐚𝐝𝐢 𝐒𝐞 𝐀𝐧𝐭𝐲𝐨𝐝𝐚𝐲𝐚 𝟗𝟎 𝐝𝐚𝐲𝐬 𝐜𝐚𝐦𝐩𝐚𝐢𝐠𝐧.
- Pakyong Police Station of Pakyong in Pakyong District of Sikkim is ranked seventh among the top ten best performing police stations in the country according to a survey conducted by the Ministry of Home Affairs, Government of India in 2020.
- Vivanta Sikkim, a Five Star hotel of Pakyong district wins HICSA best hotel of the year award.
- Jetshen Dohna Lama, 9 year old girl from Pakyong, Sikkim won singing reality show Sa Re Ga Ma Pa L'il Champs aired on Zee TV on 22 January 2022.

== Gallery ==
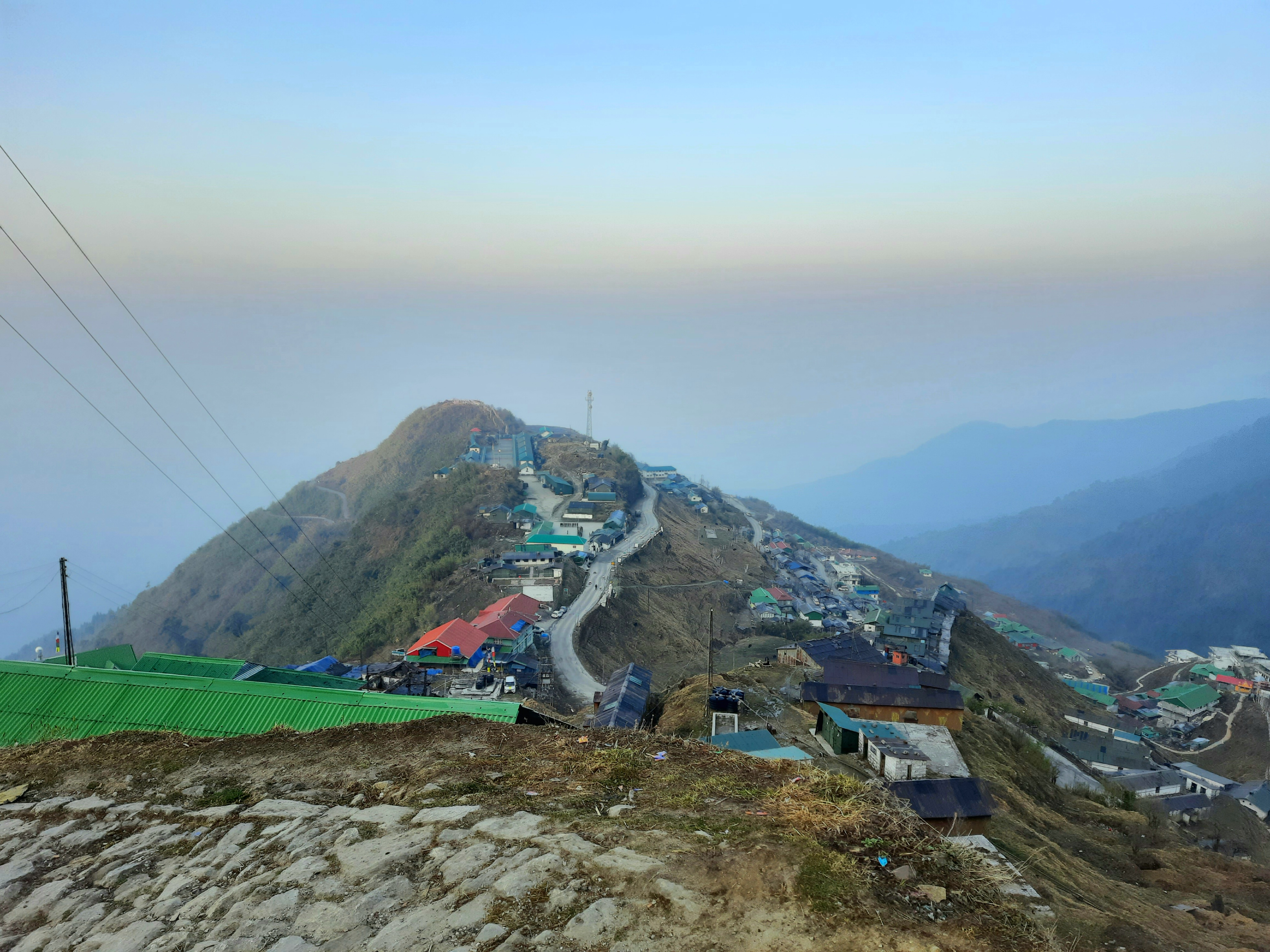
Dzuluk, Pakyong District Sikkim

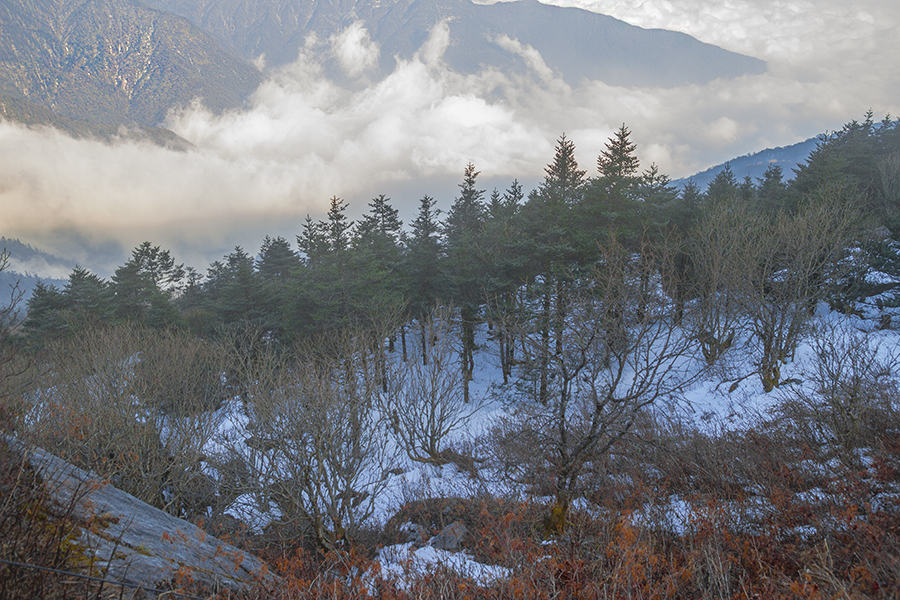
Diverse flora of Pangolakha Wildlife Sanctuary, Pakyong District, Sikkim

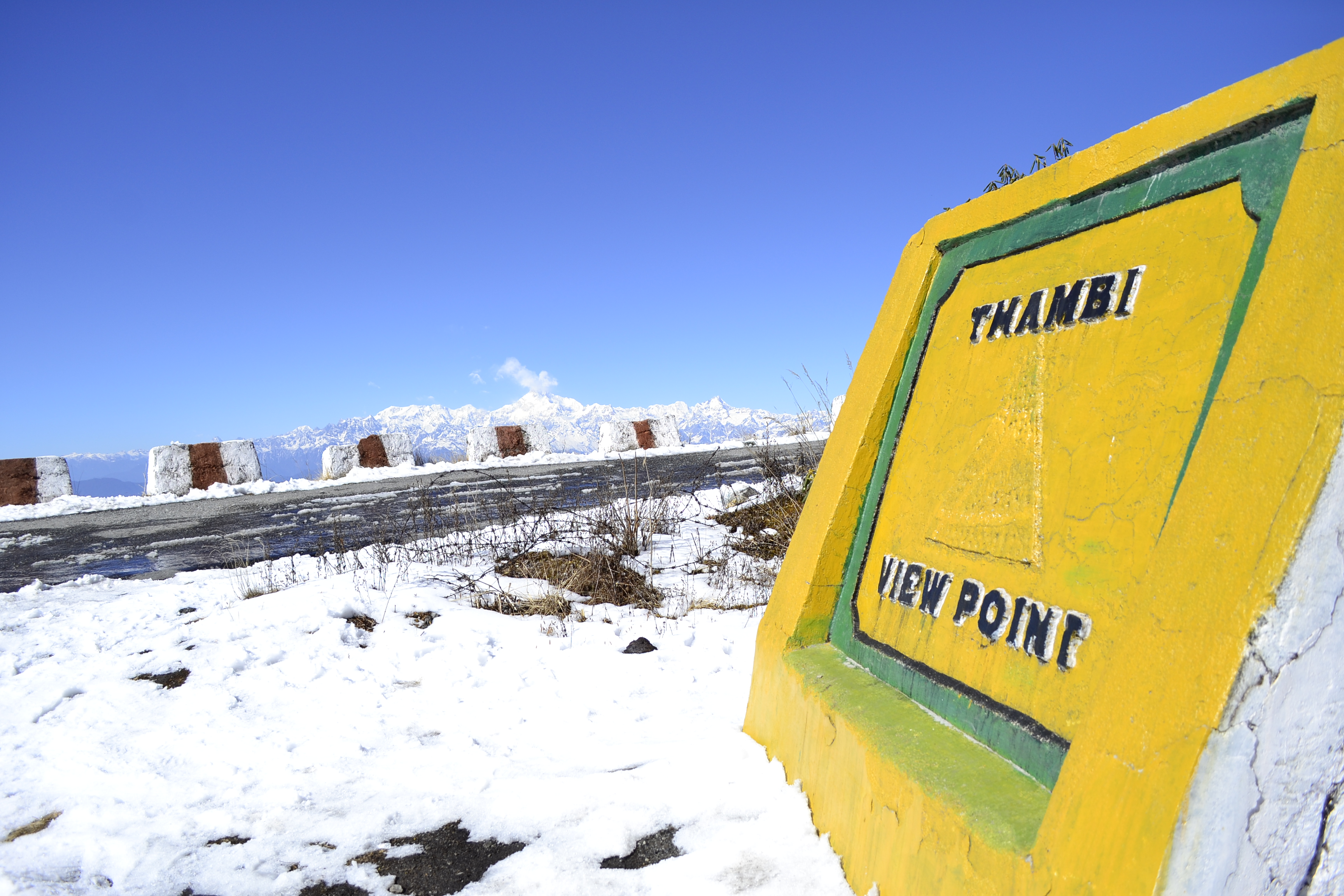
Thambi View Point Dzuluk, Pakyong District Sikkim

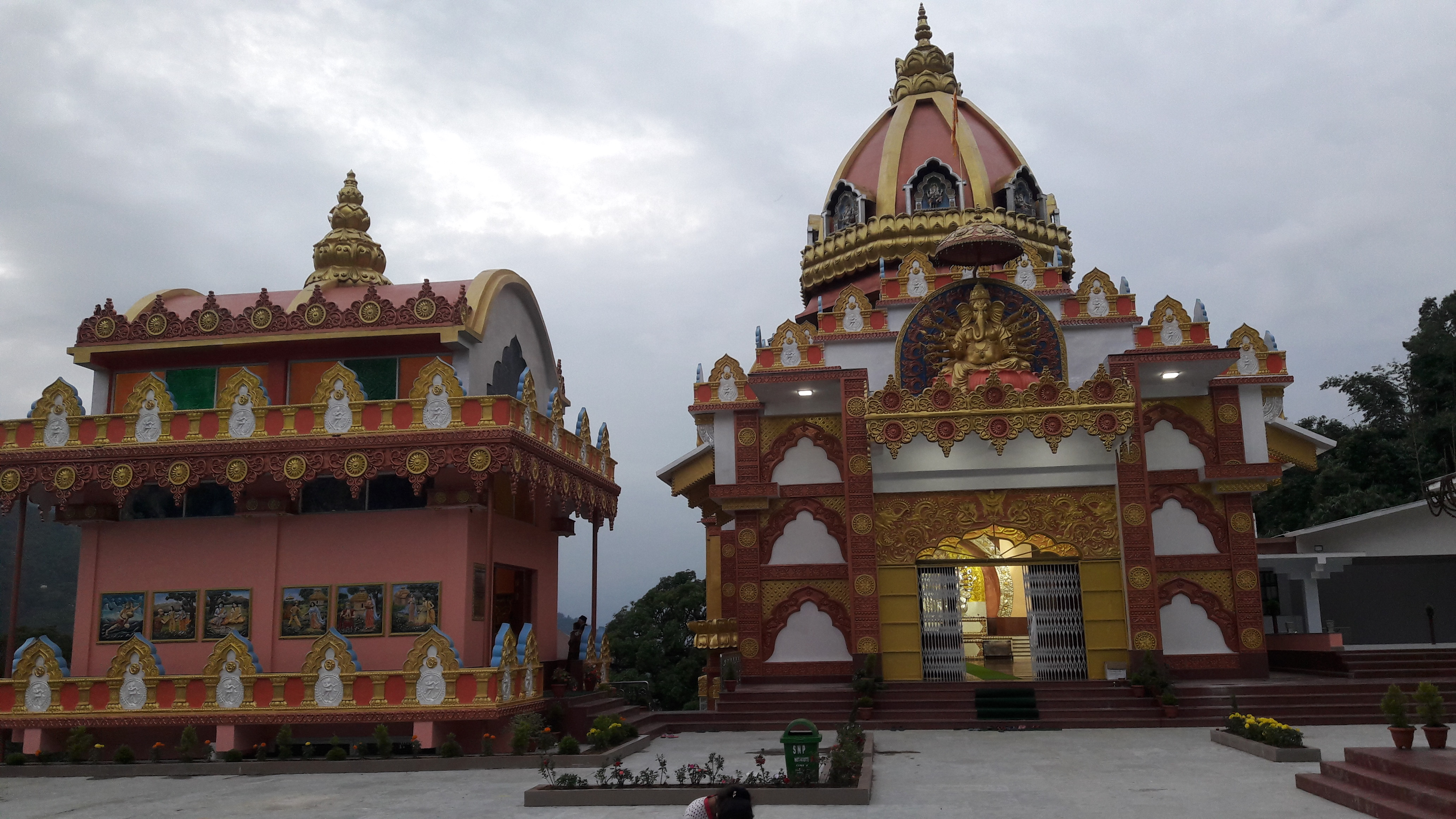
Viswa Vinayak Temple Rhenock, Pakyong District, Sikkim

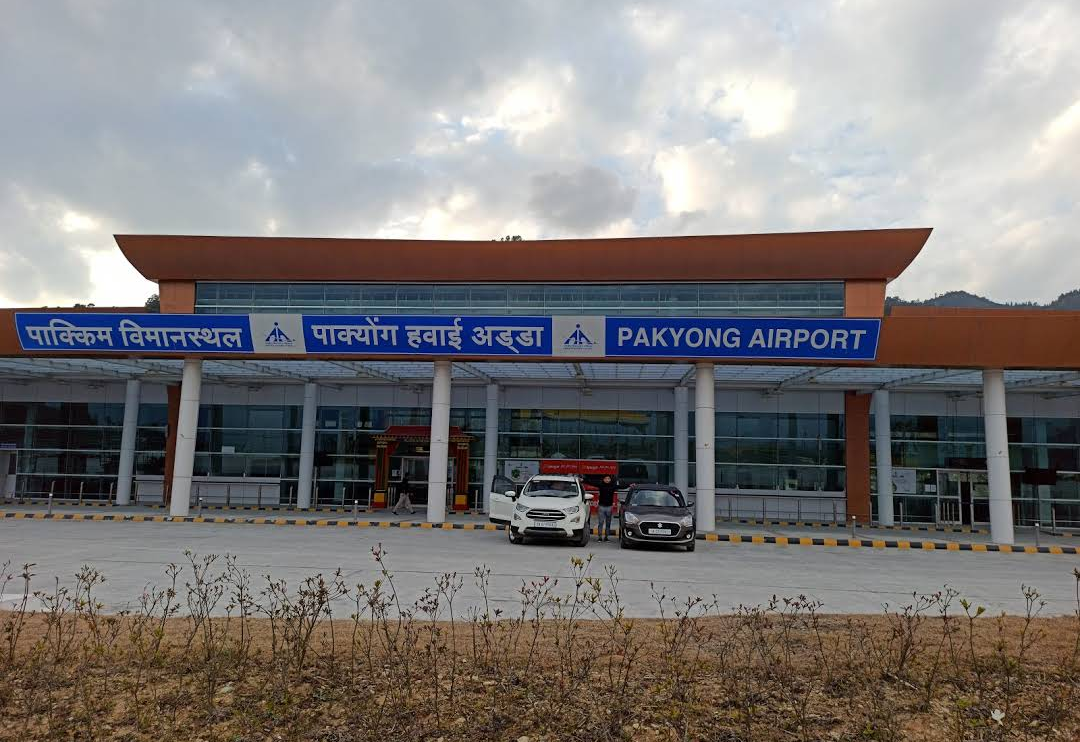
Pakyong Airport, Pakyong District, Sikkim

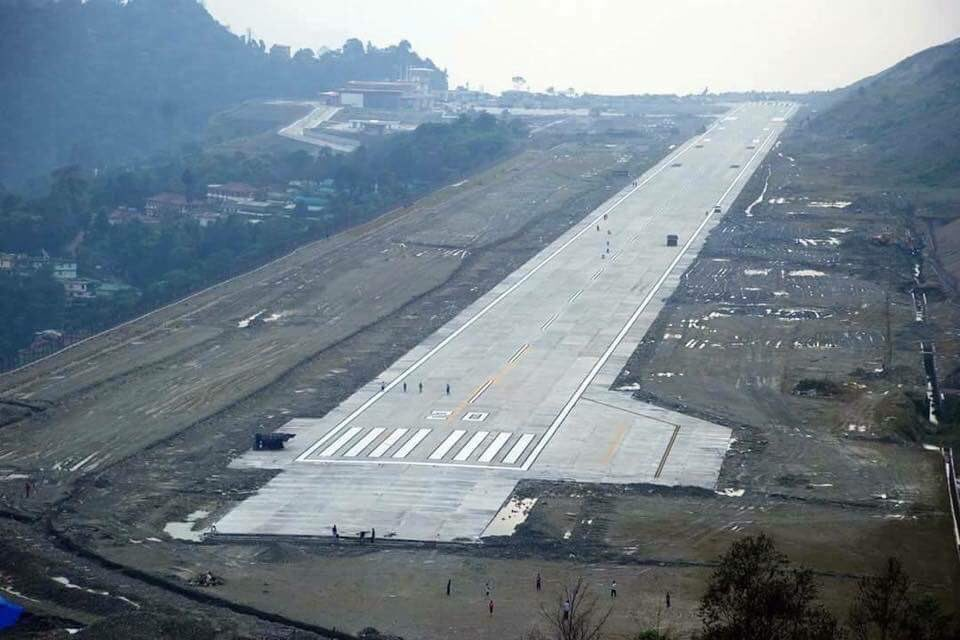
Runway at Pakyong Airport, Pakyong District Sikkim

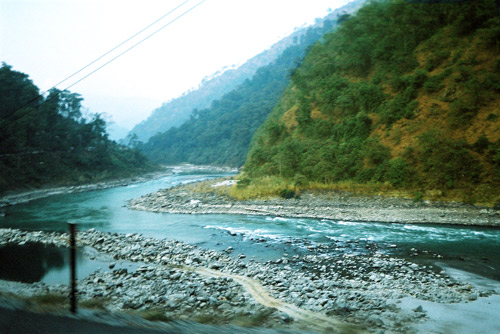
Teesta River near Majitar, Pakyong District Sikkim

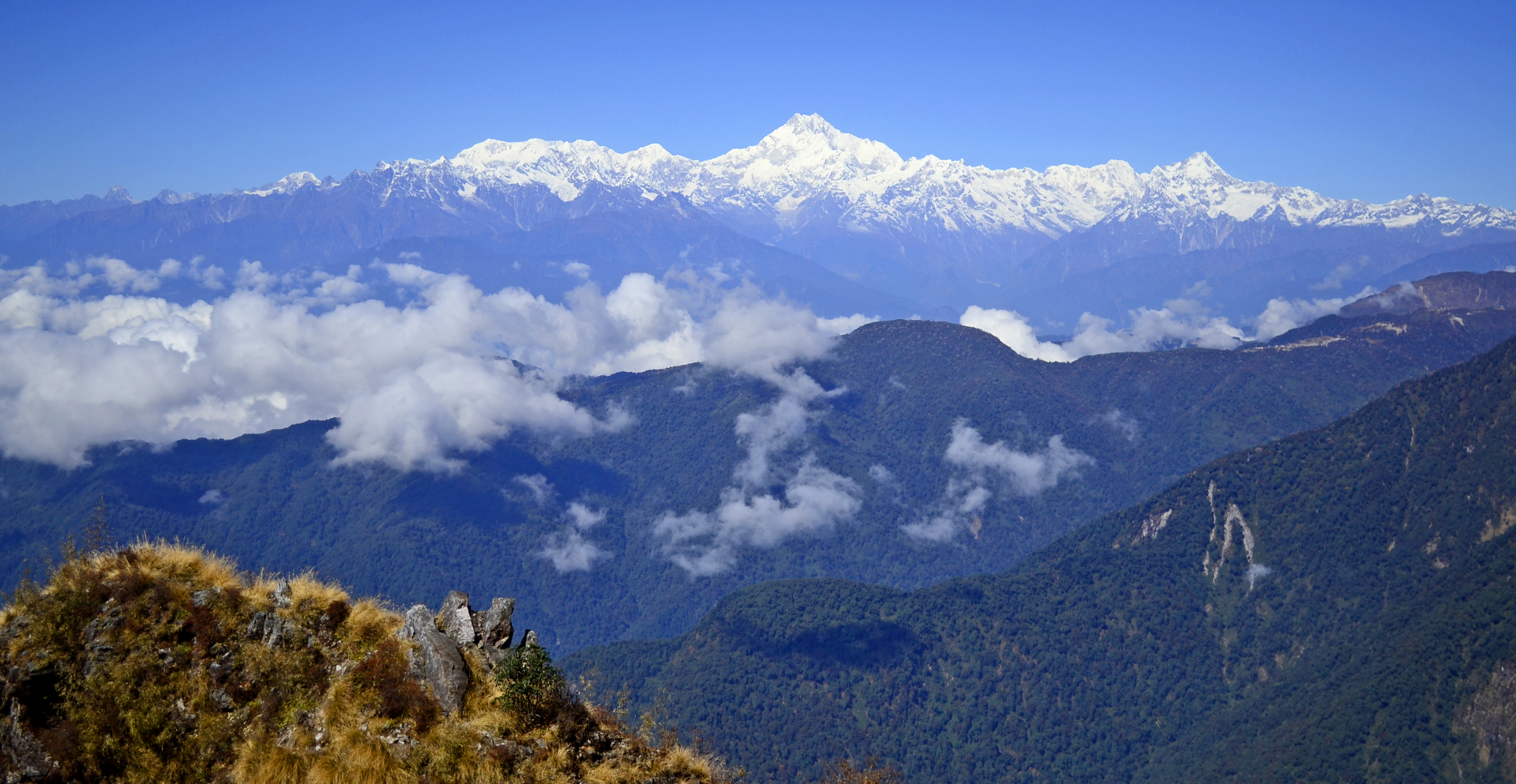
Mt. Kanchenjunga as seen from Thambi View Point,Dzuluk, Pakyong District Sikkim

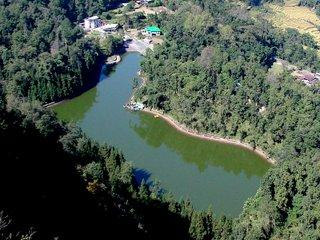
Lampokhari (lake) of Aritar, Pakyong District Sikkim

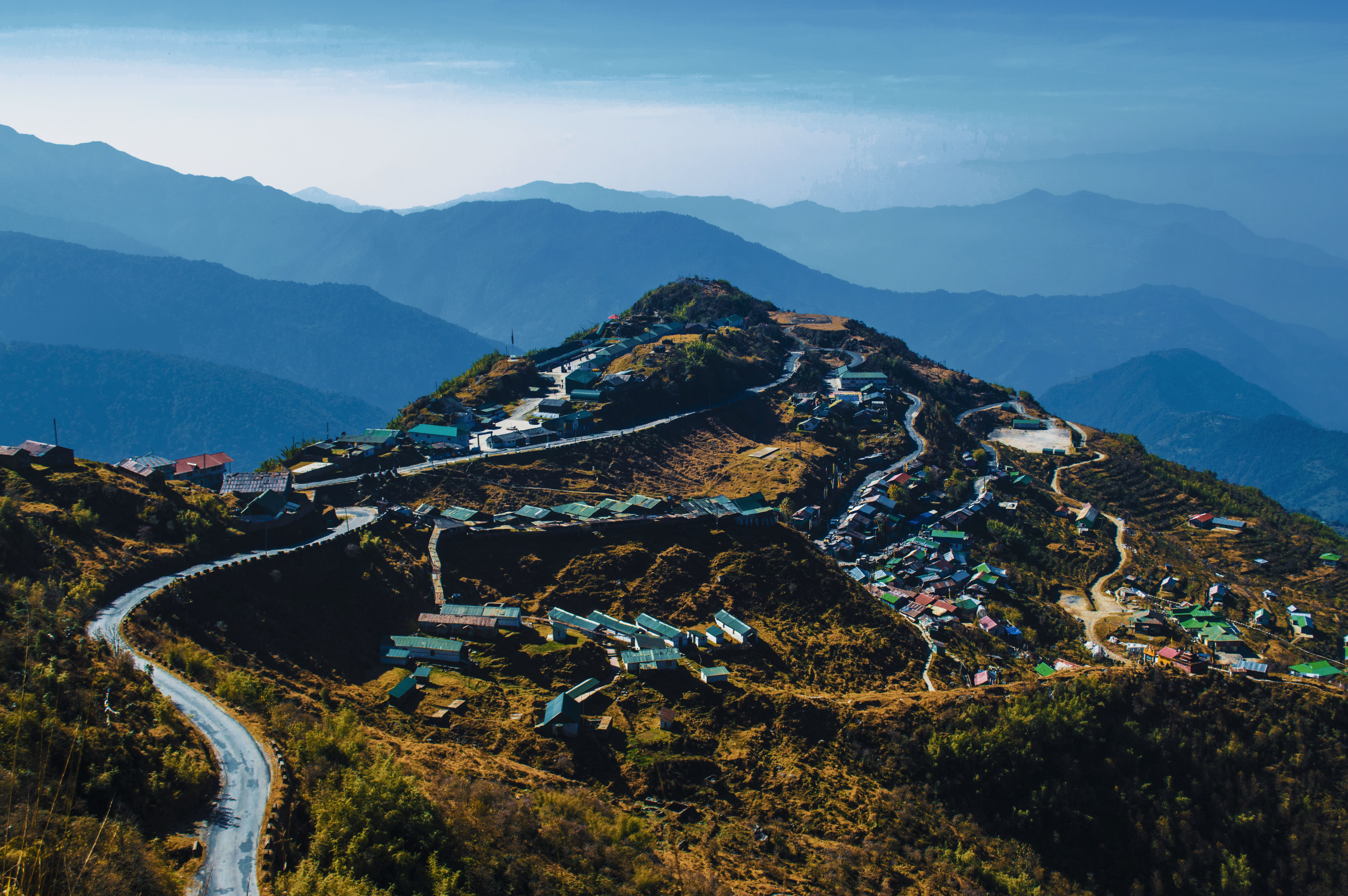
Zuluk View from Thambi Dara View Point, Pakyong District Sikkim

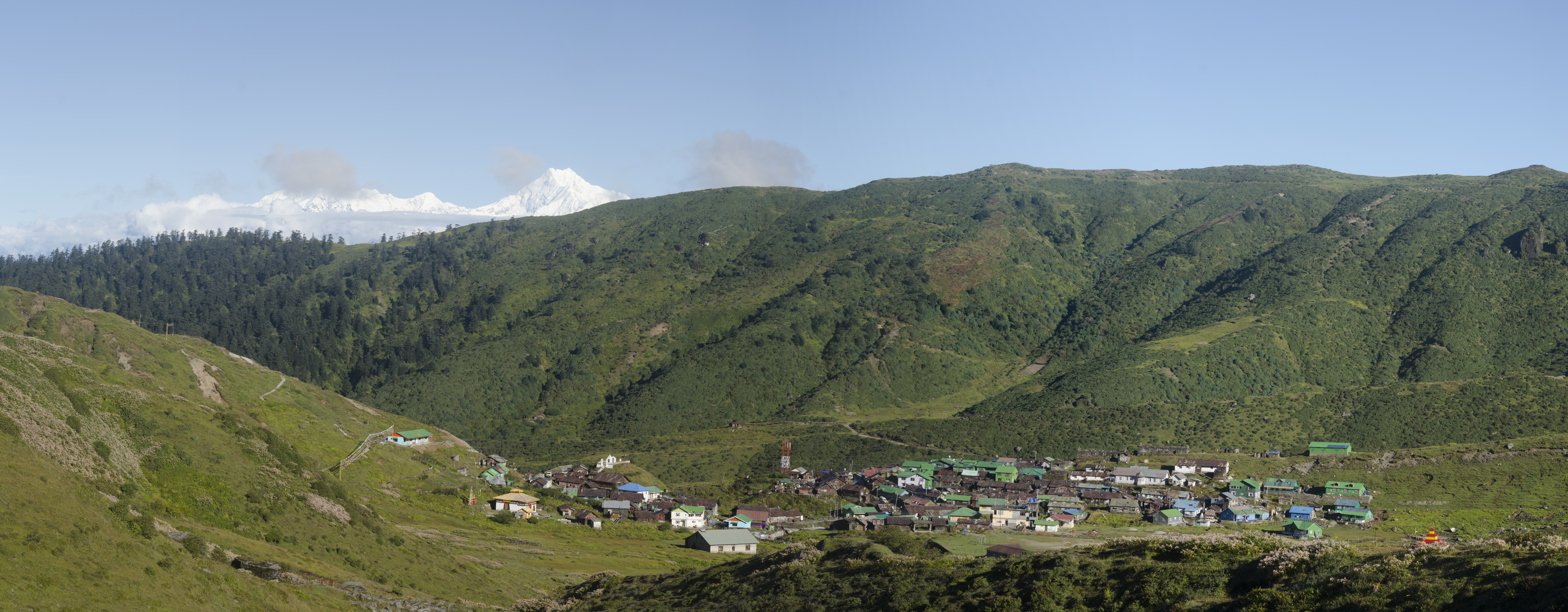
Gnathang Village Pakyong District Sikkim

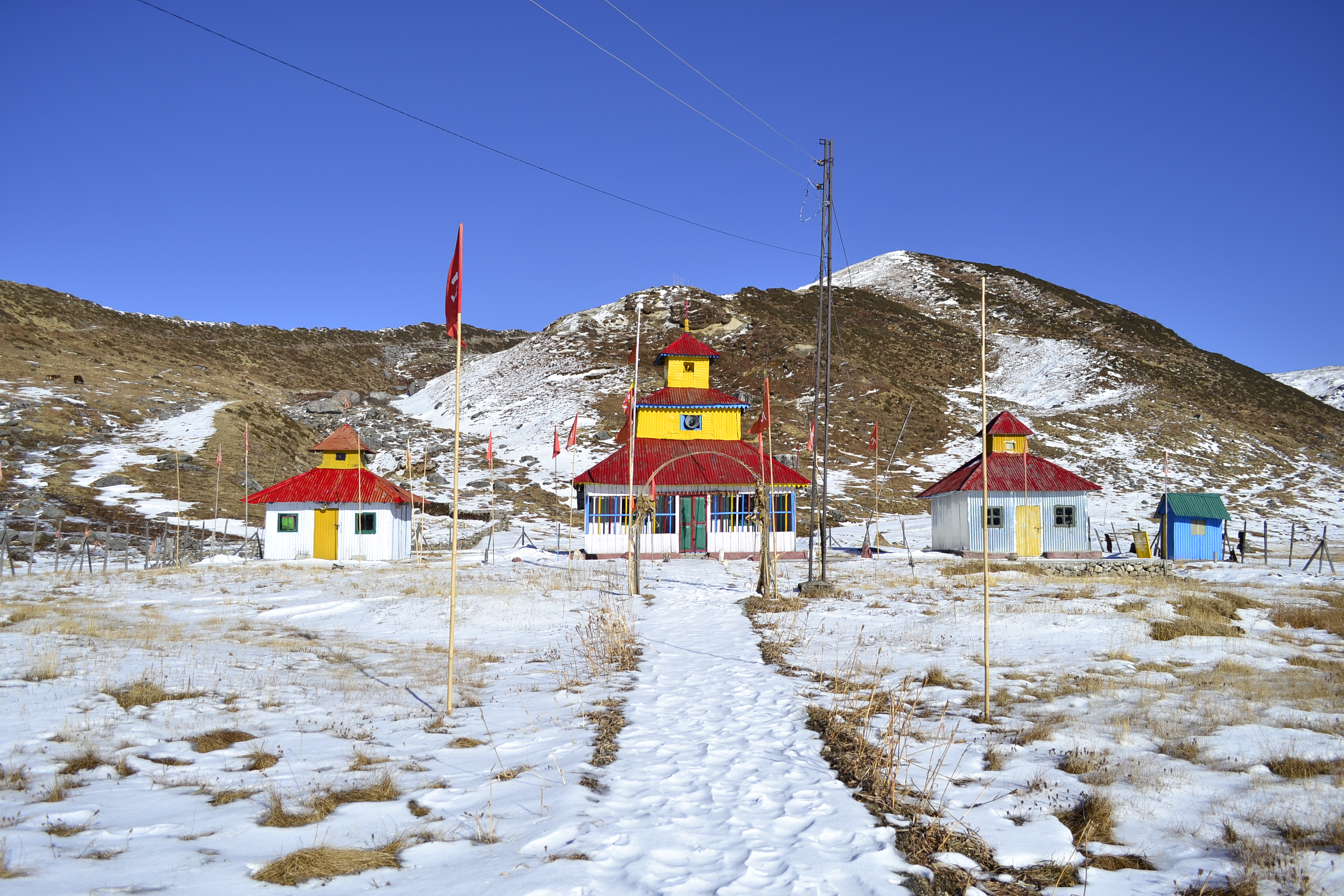
Gnathang Krishna Mandir Pakyong District Sikkim

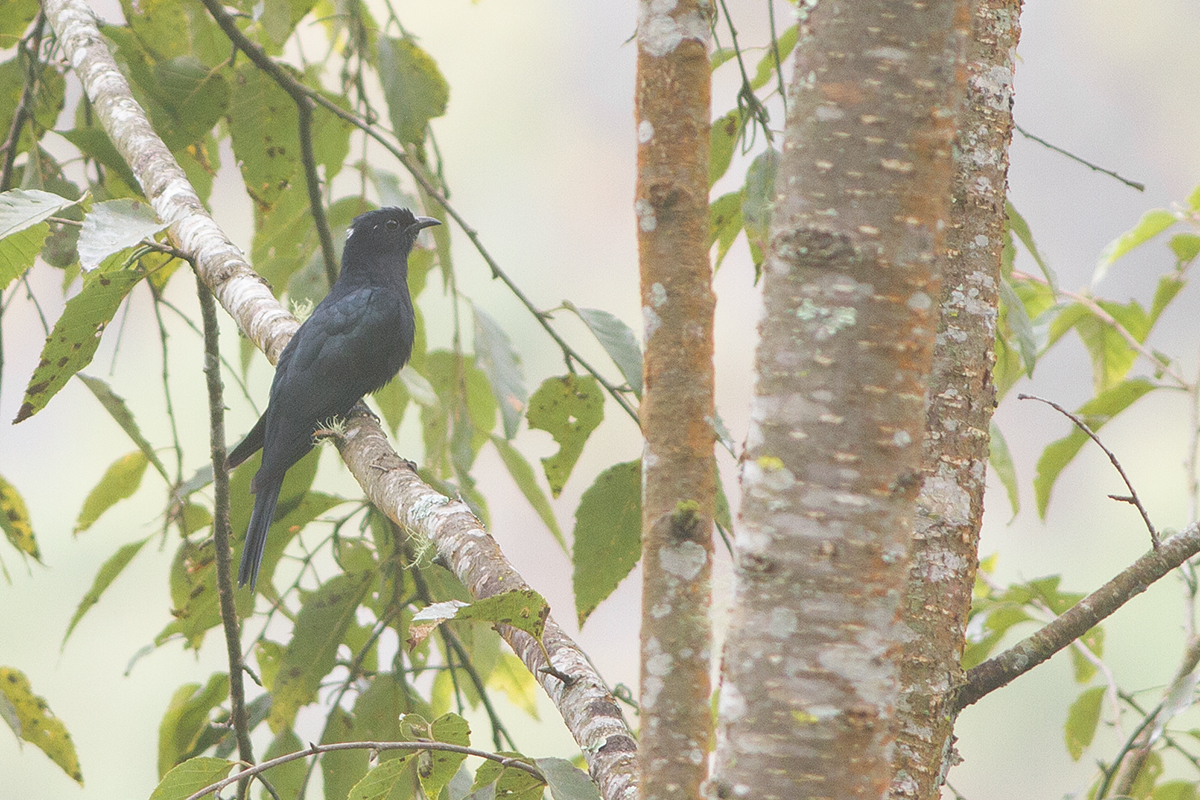
Drongo Cuckoo in Budang, Pakyong District Sikkim

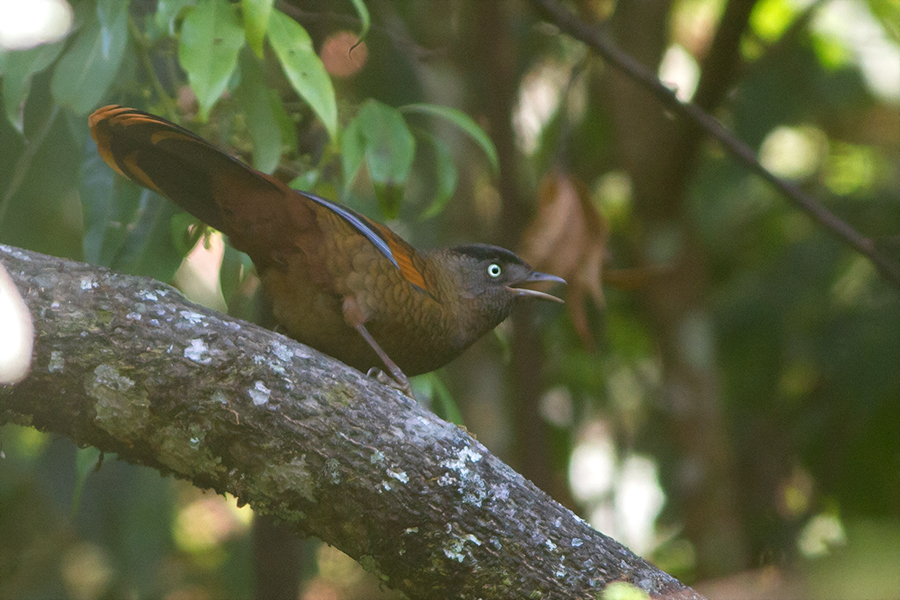
Blue-winged Laughingthrush in Pangolakha Wildlife Sanctuary Pakyong District Sikkim

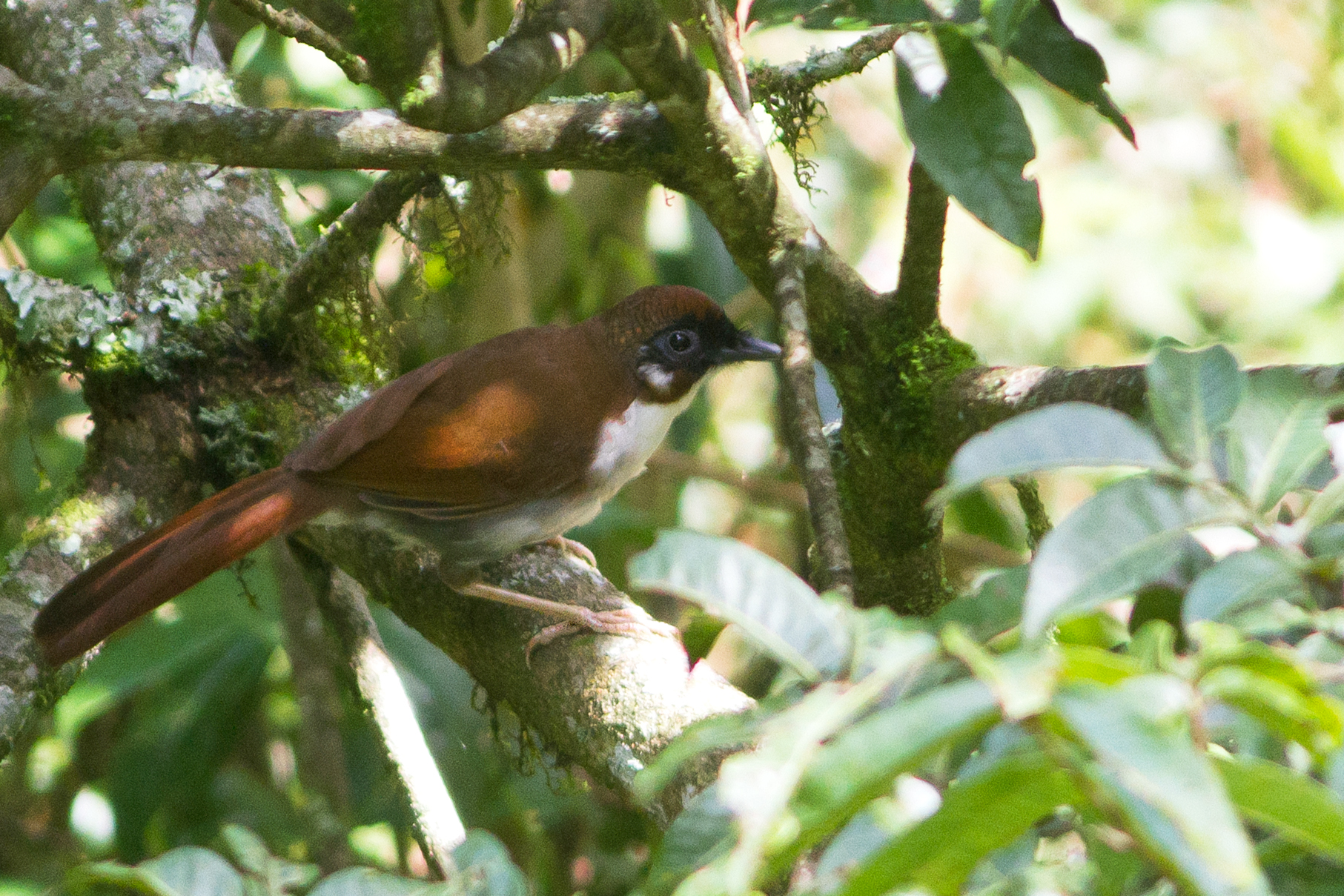
Grey-sided Laughingthrush at Pendam, Pakyong District Sikkim

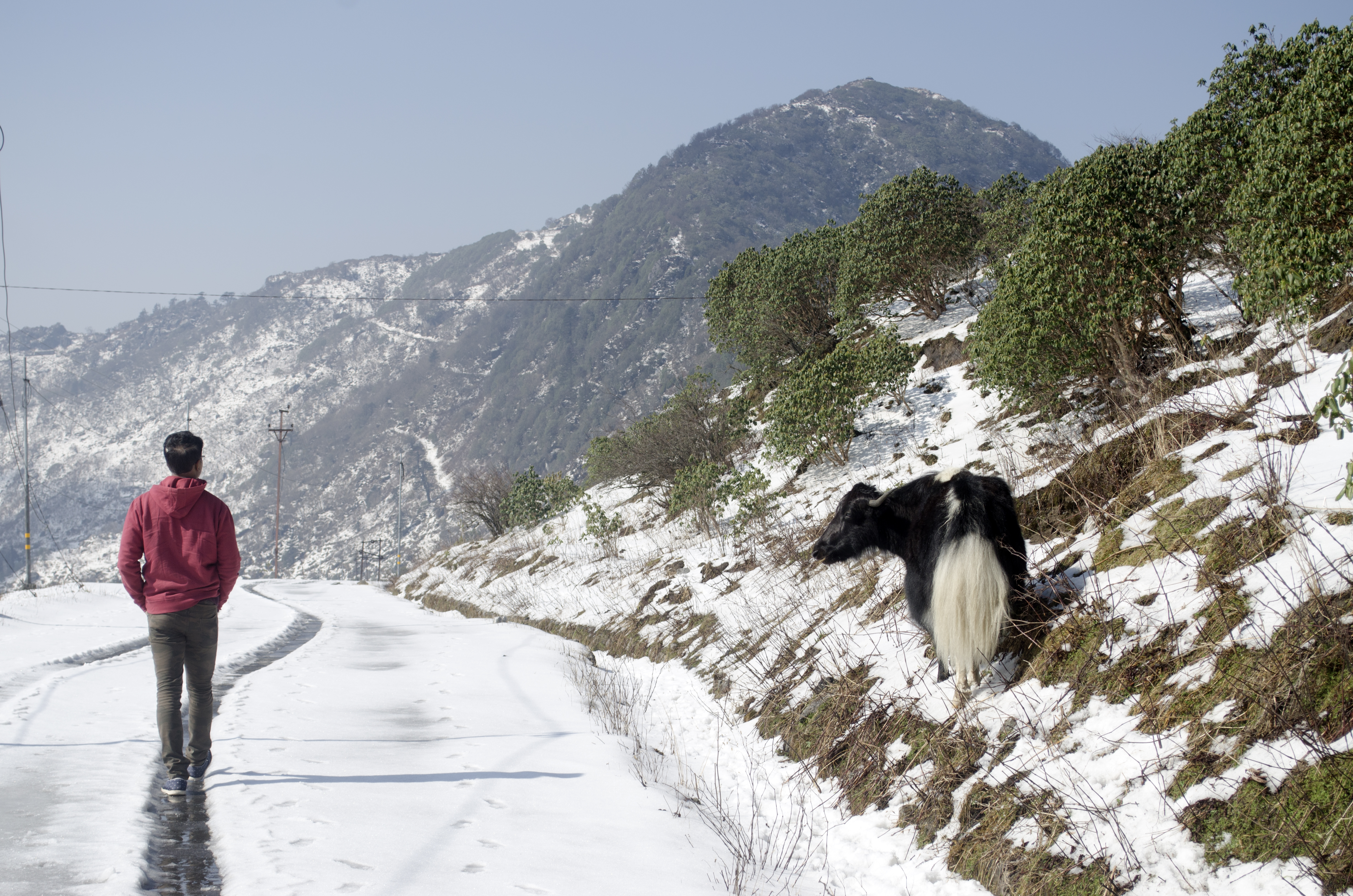
Lungthung, Pakyong District Sikkim

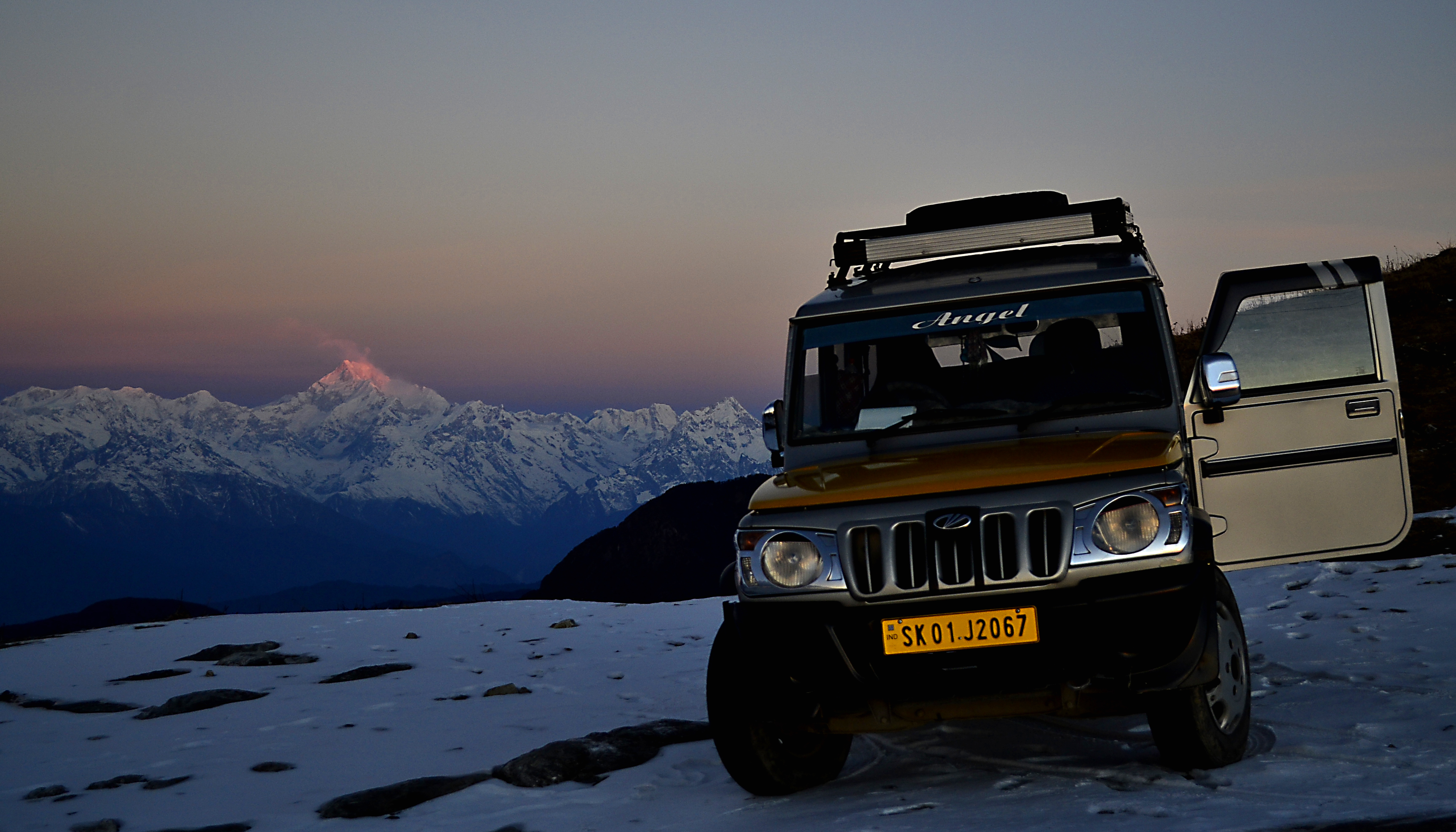
Sunrise from Lungthung View Point, Pakyong District Sikkim

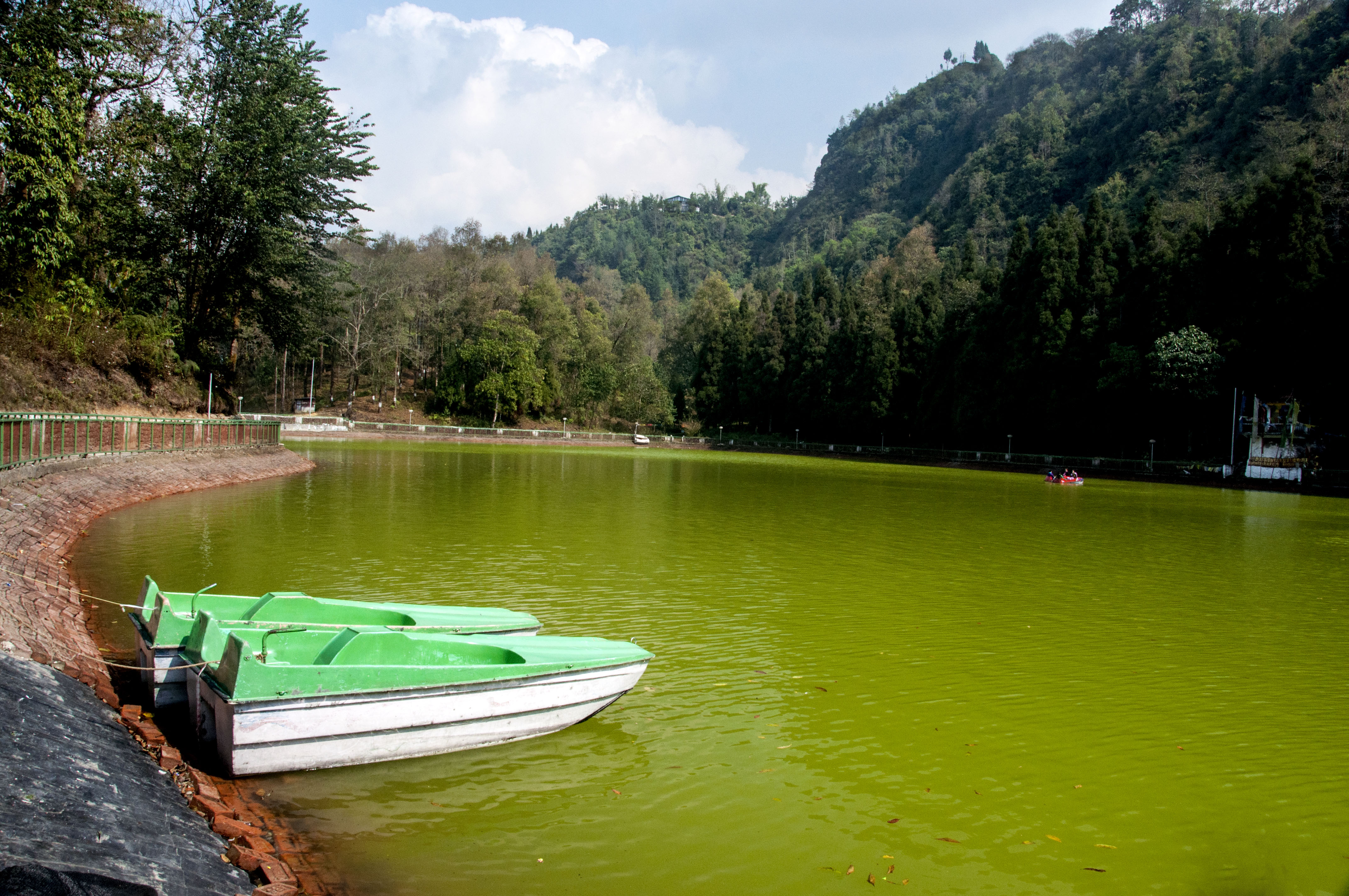
Aritar, Pakyong District Sikkim

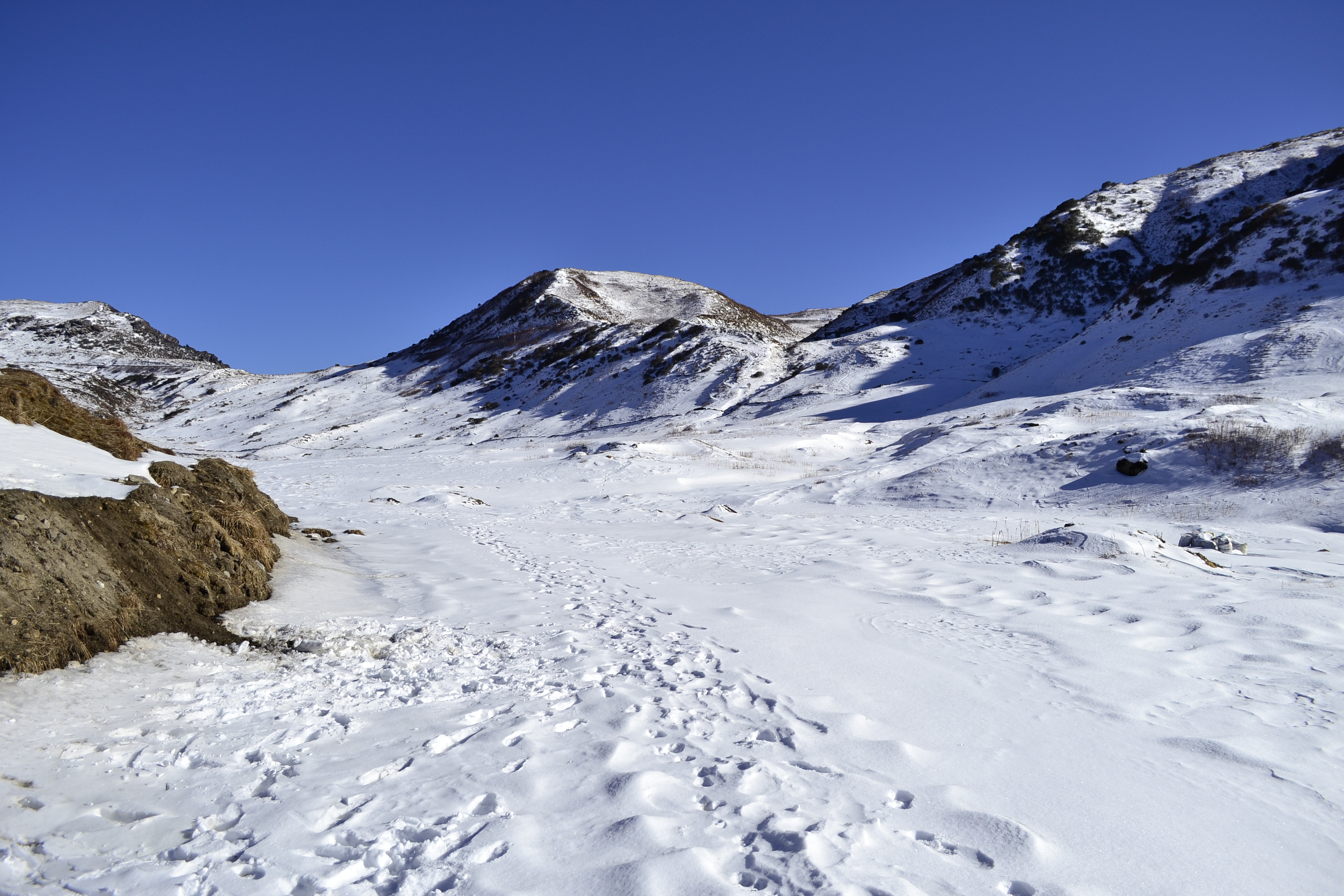
Gnathang Pakyong District Sikkim during Winters
