= 10th Sikkim Assembly =

Legislature of Sikkim, 2019–2024

←	9th Assembly	11th Assembly	→

Overview
- Legislative body: Sikkim Legislative Assembly
- Term: 28 May 2019 – 1 June 2024
- Election: 2019 Sikkim Legislative Assembly election
- Government: Tamang ministry
- Opposition: None
- Members: 32
- Leader of the House: Prem Singh Tamang
- Leader of the Opposition: Vacant
- Party control: Sikkim Krantikari Morcha

The Tenth Legislative Assembly of Sikkim constituted after the 2019 Sikkim Legislative Assembly elections. The results being declared on 23 May 2019. The term of the tenth Sikkim Legislative Assembly started on 28 May 2019.

== Members of Legislative Assembly ==
The tenth assembly was elected in 2019 Sikkim Legislative Assembly election. The current members are listed below:

District	No.	Constituency	Name	Party	Alliance	Remarks
Gyalshing	1	Yoksam–Tashiding (BL)	Sangay Lepcha	Sikkim Krantikari Morcha	NDA	
Gyalshing	2	Yangthang	Bhim Hang Limboo	Sikkim Krantikari Morcha	NDA	
Gyalshing	3	Maneybong–Dentam	Narendra Kumar Subba	Bharatiya Janata Party	NDA	Switched from SDF to BJP
Gyalshing	4	Gyalshing–Barnyak	Lok Nath Sharma	Sikkim Krantikari Morcha	NDA	
Soreng	5	Rinchenpong (BL)	Karma Sonam Lepcha	Bharatiya Janata Party	NDA	Switched from SDF to BJP
Soreng	6	Daramdin (BL)	Mingma Narbu Sherpa	Sikkim Krantikari Morcha	NDA	
Soreng	7	Soreng–Chakung	Aditya Tamang	Sikkim Krantikari Morcha	NDA	
Soreng	8	Salghari–Zoom (SC)	Sunita Gajmer	Sikkim Krantikari Morcha	NDA	
Namchi	9	Barfung (BL)	Tashi Thendup Bhutia	Bharatiya Janata Party	NDA	Switched from SDF to BJP
Namchi	10	Poklok–Kamrang	Prem Singh Tamang	Sikkim Krantikari Morcha	NDA	Won in 2019 bypoll necessitated after resignation by Pawan Kumar Chamling
Namchi	11	Namchi–Singhithang	Pawan Kumar Chamling	Sikkim Democratic Front	None	
Namchi	12	Melli	Farwanti Tamang	Bharatiya Janata Party	NDA	Switched from SDF to BJP
Namchi	13	Namthang–Rateypani	Sanjit Kharel	Sikkim Krantikari Morcha	NDA	
Namchi	14	Temi–Namphing	Bedu Singh Panth	Sikkim Krantikari Morcha	NDA	
Namchi	15	Rangang–Yangang	Raj Kumari Thapa	Independent politician	None	Switched from SDF to BJP
Namchi	16	Tumin–Lingee (BL)	Ugyen Tshering Gyatso Bhutia	Bharatiya Janata Party	NDA	Switched from SDF to BJP
Gangtok	17	Khamdong–Singtam	Mani Kumar Sharma	Sikkim Krantikari Morcha	NDA	
Pakyong	18	West Pendam (SC)	Lall Bahadur Das	Sikkim Krantikari Morcha	NDA	
Pakyong	19	Rhenock	Bishnu Kumar Sharma	Sikkim Krantikari Morcha	NDA	
Pakyong	20	Chujachen	Krishna Bahadur Rai	Bharatiya Janata Party	NDA	Switched from SDF to BJP
Pakyong	21	Gnathang–Machong (BL)	Dorjee Tshering Lepcha	Bharatiya Janata Party	NDA	Switched from SDF to BJP Elected As Rajya Sabha MP
Pakyong	21	Gnathang–Machong (BL)	Vacant			
Pakyong	22	Namchaybong	Em Prasad Sharma	Sikkim Krantikari Morcha	NDA	Switched from SDF to SKM
Gangtok	23	Shyari (BL)	Kunga Nima Lepcha	Sikkim Krantikari Morcha	NDA	
Gangtok	24	Martam–Rumtek (BL)	Sonam Venchungpa	Bharatiya Janata Party	NDA	Won in 2019 bypoll necessitated after resignation by Dorjee Tshering Lepcha
Gangtok	25	Upper Tadong	Gay Tshering Dhungel	Sikkim Krantikari Morcha	NDA	Switched from SDF to SKM
Gangtok	26	Arithang	Arun Kumar Upreti	Sikkim Krantikari Morcha	NDA	
Gangtok	27	Gangtok (BL)	Yong Tshering Lepcha	Bharatiya Janata Party	NDA	Won in 2019 bypoll necessitated after resignation by Kunga Nima Lepcha
Gangtok	28	Upper Burtuk	Dilli Ram Thapa	Bharatiya Janata Party	NDA	Switched from SDF to BJP
Mangan	29	Kabi–Lungchok (BL)	Karma Loday Bhutia	Sikkim Krantikari Morcha	NDA	
Mangan	30	Djongu (BL)	Pintso Namgyal Lepcha	Independent politician	None	Switched from SDF to BJP
Mangan	31	Lachen–Mangan (BL)	Samdup Lepcha	Sikkim Krantikari Morcha	NDA	
Buddhist Monasteries	32	Sangha	Sonam Lama	Sikkim Krantikari Morcha	NDA	
