= Elections in Sikkim =

Elections in Sikkim were held in the Kingdom of Sikkim between 1953 and 1974, and, after its integration with India, since 1979 as the Indian state of Sikkim. The total number of seats in the assembly is 32, including one seat reserved for the Sangha.

== Assembly Elections ==
=== General elections ===
The general elections took place before Sikkim's integration with India.

==== 1953 ====
Party	Seats		
Party	Bhutia-Lepcha	Nepali	Total
Sikkim National Party	6	0	6
Sikkim State Congress	0	6	6
Appointed members	–	–	6
Total	6	6	18

==== 1958 ====
Party	Seats				
Party	Bhutia-Lepcha	Nepali	Others	Total	+/–
Sikkim State Congress	1	6	0	7	+1
Sikkim National Party	5	0	1	6	0
Independent	0	0	1	1	+1
Appointed members	–	–	–	6	0
Total	6	6	2	20	+2

==== 1967 ====
Party	Seats	+/–
Sikkim National Congress	8	New
Sikkim National Party	5	–1
Sikkim State Congress	2	–5
Others	3	+3
Appointed members	6	–1
Total	24	+4

==== 1970 ====
Party	Seats	+/–
Sikkim National Party	8	+3
Sikkim State Congress	4	+2
Sikkim National Congress	3	–5
Others	3	0
Appointed members	6	0
Total	24	0

==== 1973 ====
Party	Seats	+/–
Sikkim National Party	9	+1
Sikkim National Congress	5	+2
Sikkim Janata Congress	2	–
Independents	2	–
Appointed members	6	0
Total	24	0
Source: AC Sinha

==== 1974 ====
Party	Seats	+/–
Sikkim National Congress	31	+26
Sikkim National Party	1	–8
Total	32	+8
Source: Sikkim Assembly

=== Legislative Assembly elections ===
==== 1979 ====
Party	Votes	%	Seats
Sikkim Janata Parishad	22,776	31.49	16
Sikkim Congress (Revolutionary)	14,889	20.58	11
Sikkim Prajatantra Congress	11,400	15.76	4
Janata Party	9,534	13.18	0
Indian National Congress	1,476	2.04	0
Communist Party of India (Marxist)	241	0.33	0
Sikkim Scheduled Caste League	85	0.12	0
Independents	11,938	16.50	1
Total	72,339	100.00	32
Valid votes	72,339	94.81	
Invalid/blank votes	3,960	5.19	
Total votes	76,299	100.00	
Registered voters/turnout	117,157	65.13	
Source: ECI

==== 1985 ====
Party	Votes	%	Seats	+/–
Sikkim Sangram Parishad	60,371	62.20	30	+14
Indian National Congress	23,440	24.15	1	+1
Janata Party	913	0.94	0	0
Sikkim Prajatantra Congress	438	0.45	0	–4
Communist Party of India (Marxist)	336	0.35	0	0
Communist Party of India	25	0.03	0	New
Independents	11,534	11.88	1	0
Total	97,057	100.00	32	0
Valid votes	97,057	97.61		
Invalid/blank votes	2,378	2.39		
Total votes	99,435	100.00		
Registered voters/turnout	155,041	64.13		
Source: ECI

==== 1989 ====
Party	Votes	%	Seats	+/–
Sikkim Sangram Parishad	94,078	70.41	32	+2
Indian National Congress	24,121	18.05	0	–1
Rising Sun Party	11,472	8.59	0	New
Denzong Peoples Chogpi	298	0.22	0	New
Independents	3,650	2.73	0	–1
Total	133,619	100.00	32	0
Valid votes	133,619	95.97		
Invalid/blank votes	5,608	4.03		
Total votes	139,227	100.00		
Registered voters/turnout	192,619	72.28		
Source: ECI

==== 1994 ====
Party	Votes	%	Seats	+/–
Sikkim Democratic Front	72,856	42.00	19	New
Sikkim Sangram Parishad	60,851	35.08	10	–22
Indian National Congress	26,045	15.02	2	+2
Revolutionary Socialist Party	2,906	1.68	0	New
Bharatiya Janata Party	274	0.16	0	New
Communist Party of India (Marxist)	270	0.16	0	New
Independents	10,255	5.91	1	+1
Total	173,457	100.00	32	0
Valid votes	173,457	97.44		
Invalid/blank votes	4,566	2.56		
Total votes	178,023	100.00		
Registered voters/turnout	217,743	81.76		
Source: ECI

==== 1999 ====
Party	No. of candidates	No. elected	Votes won	%
Communist Party of India (Marxist)	2	0	398	0.19%
Indian National Congress	31	0	7,512	3.67%
Sikkim Democratic Front	31	24	107,214	52.32%
Sikkim Sangram Parishad	32	7	85,827	41.88%
Independents	9	1	3,976	1.94%
Total:	105	32	204,927	

==== 2004 ====
Party	No. of candidates	No. of elected	No. of votes	%
Bharatiya Janata Party	4	0	667	0.34%
Communist Party of India (Marxist)	1	0	144	0.07%
Indian National Congress	28	1	51329	26.13%
Sikkim Democratic Front	32	31	139662	71.09%
Sikkim Himali Rajya Parishad	9	0	1123	0.57%
Sikkim Sangram Parishad	1	0	90	0.05%
Independents	16	0	3450	1.76%
Total:	91	32	196465	

==== 2009 ====
Party	No. of candidates	No. of elected	No. of votes	%
Bharatiya Janata Party	11	0	1966	0.78%
Communist Party of India (Marxist)	3	0	272	0.11%
Indian National Congress	32	0	69612	27.64%
Sikkim Democratic Front	32	32	165991	65.91%
Sikkim Democratic Front	20	0	5516	2.19%
Nationalist Congress Party	11	0	1065	0.42%
Independent	16	0	3450	1.37%
SGPP	27	0	2909	1.16%
SJEP	6	0	497	0.2%
Total:	167	32	251851	
Source: Election Commission of India

==== 2014 ====
Summary of results of the 2014 Sikkim Legislative Assembly election
Political Party	Candidates	Number of Votes	Seats Won	Net Change in seats	% of votes
SDF	32	169983	22	▼10	55.0%
SKM	32	126024	10	▲10	40.8%
INC	32	4390	0	0	1.4%
BJP	13	2208	0	0	0.7%
AITC	7	586	0	0	0.2%
Independent	5	1227	0	0	0.4
NOTA		4460	-	-	1.4%
Total		478,861	32		

==== 2019 ====

Party	Contested	Won	+/–	Votes	%	+/–
Sikkim Krantikari Morcha	32	17	▲7	1,65,508	47.03	6.23▲
Sikkim Democratic Front	32	15	▼7	1,67,620	47.63	7.37▼
Bharatiya Janata Party	12	0	Steady	5,700	1.62	0.92▲
Indian National Congress	24	0	Steady	2,721	0.77	0.63▼
Hamro Sikkim Party	23	0	Steady	2,098	0.60	Steady
Independents		0	Steady			Steady
Total		32				
Source: Election Commission of India

==== 2024 ====
Party	Votes	%	Seats	+/–
Sikkim Krantikari Morcha	225,068	59.41	31	+14
Sikkim Democratic Front	105,503	27.85	1	-14
Bharatiya Janata Party	19,956	5.27	–	–
Indian National Congress	1,228	0.32	–	–
Citizen Action Party - Sikkim	23,261	6.14	–	–
NOTA	3,813	1.01	–	–
Total	378,829	100.00	32	–
Source: Election Commission of India

== Table Summary ==
Election year	Vidhan Sabha election	1st party	2nd party	Others	Total seats	Chief minister	CM's party
1979	Second Assembly	SJP 16	SCR 11	SPC 4,IND. 1	32	Nar Bahadur Bhandari	SJP
1985	Third Assembly	SSP 30	INC 1	IND 1	32	Nar Bahadur Bhandari	SSP
1989	Fourth Assembly	SSP 32			32	Nar Bahadur Bhandari	SSP
1994	Fifth Assembly	SDF 19	SSP 10	INC 2,IND 1	32	Pawan Kumar Chamling	SDF
1999	Sixth Assembly	SDF 24	SSP 7	IND 1	32	Pawan Kumar Chamling	SDF
2004	Seventh Assembly	SDF 31	INC 1		32	Pawan Kumar Chamling	SDF
2009	Eighth Assembly	SDF 32			32	Pawan Kumar Chamling	SDF
2014	Ninth Assembly	SDF 22	SKM 10		32	Pawan Kumar Chamling	SDF
2019	Tenth Assembly	SKM 17	SDF 15		32	Prem Singh Tamang	SKM
2024	Eleventh Assembly	SKM 31	SDF 1		32	Prem Singh Tamang	SKM

== Loksabha Election ==
Election	Member	Party
1977	Chhatra Bahadur Chhetri	Indian National Congress
1980	Pahal Man Subba	Sikkim Janata Parishad
1984	Nar Bahadur Bhandari	Independent
1985	Dil Kumari Bhandari	Sikkim Sangram Parishad
1989	Nandu Thapa	Sikkim Sangram Parishad
1991	Dil Kumari Bhandari	Sikkim Sangram Parishad
1996	Bhim Prasad Dahal	Sikkim Democratic Front
1998	Bhim Prasad Dahal	Sikkim Democratic Front
1999	Bhim Prasad Dahal	Sikkim Democratic Front
2004	Nakul Das Rai	Sikkim Democratic Front
2009	Prem Das Rai	Sikkim Democratic Front
2014	Prem Das Rai	Sikkim Democratic Front
2019	Indra Hang Subba	Sikkim Krantikari Morcha
2024	Indra Hang Subba	Sikkim Krantikari Morcha
