= 2014 Indian general election in Sikkim =

Indian general election, 2014 in Sikkim
- 12 April 2014

Single constituency from Sikkim to the Lok Sabha
- Turnout: 83.64%
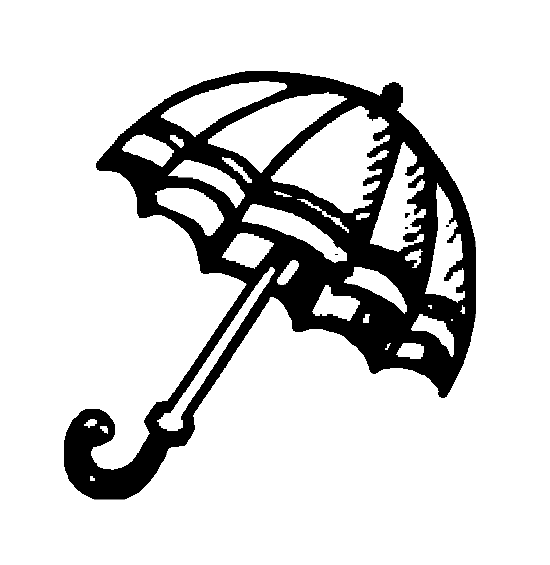
	Majority party
Party	SDF
Alliance	NDA
Last election	1 seat
Seats won	1
Seat change	Steady
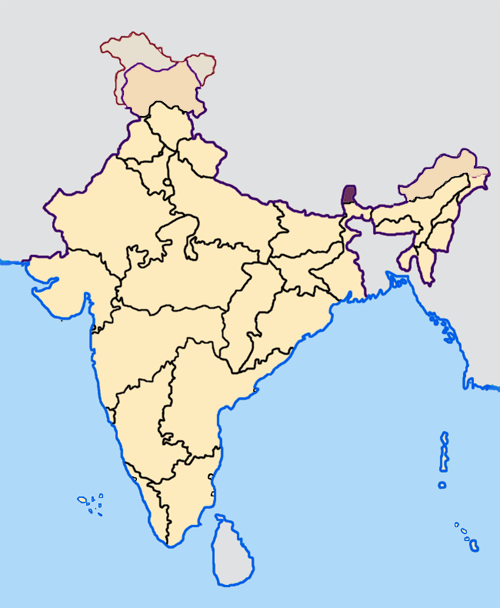
- Sikkim

The 2014 Indian general election in Sikkim was held for the lone Lok Sabha seat in the state. The voting process was held in a single phase on 12 April 2014.

These elections were held alongside the legislative state assembly election of Sikkim. Sikkim was among the four Indian states (Andhra Pradesh, Telangana, and Odisha being the other three) where assembly elections were simultaneously held with Lok Sabha election.

Sikkim Democratic Front (SDF)'s candidate Prem Das Rai won the election.

== Nomination ==
A total of 6 candidates (all men) filed their nominations for the lone seat. None of them were rejected / withdrew from the nomination.

Electronic Voting Machines (EVMs) were used for polling.

== Result ==
Security deposit of four candidates was forfeited after they failed to secure more than one-sixth (16.7%) of the total valid votes cast.

Sikkim Democratic Front (SDF)'s candidate Prem Das Rai won the election.

=== Party-wise results ===
Party Name	Popular vote			Seats		
Party Name	Votes	%	±pp	Contested	Won	+/−
SDF	1,63,698	52.98	▼10.32	1	1	Steady
SKM	1,21,956	39.47	Steady	1	0	Steady
BJP	7,279	2.36	▲0.59	1	0	Steady
INC	7,189	2.33	▼27.26	1	0	Steady
AAP	2,541	0.82	Steady	1	0	Steady
AITC	1,972	0.64	Steady	1	0	Steady
NOTA	4,332	1.40	Steady			
Total	3,08,967	100%	-	6	1	-

== List of elected MPs ==
Keys: SDF (1)

Constituency		Turnout	Winner				Runner-up				Margin	
Constituency		Turnout	Candidate	Party	Votes	%	Candidate	Party	Votes	%	Votes	%
1	Sikkim	83.37%	Prem Das Rai	SDF	163,698	52.98	Tek Nath Dhakal	SKM	121,956	39.47	41,742	13.51

== Assembly Wise Lead ==
=== Constituency Wise ===
Constituency		Winner			Runner-up			Margin
#	Name	Candidate	Party	Votes	Candidate	Party	Votes	Margin
1	Yoksam-Tashiding (ST)	Prem Das Rai	SDF	6,672	Tek Nath Dhakal	SKM	2,362	4,310
2	Yangthang	Prem Das Rai	SDF	5,044	Tek Nath Dhakal	SKM	3,419	1,625
3	Maneybung-Dentam	Prem Das Rai	SDF	7,349	Tek Nath Dhakal	SKM	2,351	4,998
4	Gyalshing-Barnyak	Prem Das Rai	SDF	4,271	Tek Nath Dhakal	SKM	3,652	619
5	Rinchenpong (ST)	Prem Das Rai	SDF	7,089	Tek Nath Dhakal	SKM	2,769	4,320
6	Daramdin (ST)	Prem Das Rai	SDF	5,988	Tek Nath Dhakal	SKM	4,199	1,789
7	Soreong-Chakung	Prem Das Rai	SDF	6,224	Tek Nath Dhakal	SKM	4,301	1,923
8	Salghari-Zoom (SC)	Prem Das Rai	SDF	3,972	Tek Nath Dhakal	SKM	3,234	738
9	Barfung (ST)	Prem Das Rai	SDF	6,448	Tek Nath Dhakal	SKM	3,207	3,241
10	Poklok-Kamrang	Prem Das Rai	SDF	7,741	Tek Nath Dhakal	SKM	3,062	4,679
11	Namchi-Singhithang	Prem Das Rai	SDF	4,499	Tek Nath Dhakal	SKM	3,350	1,149
12	Melli	Prem Das Rai	SDF	7,335	Tek Nath Dhakal	SKM	3,126	4,209
13	Namthang-Rateypani	Prem Das Rai	SDF	5,836	Tek Nath Dhakal	SKM	4,321	1,515
14	Temi-Namphing	Prem Das Rai	SDF	5,428	Tek Nath Dhakal	SKM	3,823	1,605
15	Rangang-Yangang	Prem Das Rai	SDF	6,174	Tek Nath Dhakal	SKM	2,863	3,311
16	Tumen-Lingi (ST)	Prem Das Rai	SDF	6,700	Tek Nath Dhakal	SKM	3,927	2,773
17	Khamdong-Singtam	Prem Das Rai	SDF	4,538	Tek Nath Dhakal	SKM	4,182	356
18	West Pendam (SC)	Tek Nath Dhakal	SKM	5,064	Prem Das Rai	SDF	4,241	823
19	Rhenock	Tek Nath Dhakal	SKM	6,251	Prem Das Rai	SDF	5,175	1,076
20	Chujachen	Prem Das Rai	SDF	7,149	Tek Nath Dhakal	SKM	4,316	2,833
21	Gnathang-Machong (ST)	Prem Das Rai	SDF	4,673	Tek Nath Dhakal	SKM	3,019	1,654
22	Namcheybung	Prem Das Rai	SDF	5,185	Tek Nath Dhakal	SKM	4,605	580
23	Shyari (ST)	Tek Nath Dhakal	SKM	4,841	Prem Das Rai	SDF	4,231	610
24	Martam-Rumtek (ST)	Tek Nath Dhakal	SKM	5,592	Prem Das Rai	SDF	5,123	469
25	Upper Tadong	Tek Nath Dhakal	SKM	3,366	Prem Das Rai	SDF	2,586	780
26	Arithang	Tek Nath Dhakal	SKM	3,700	Prem Das Rai	SDF	2,191	1,509
27	Gangtok (ST)	Tek Nath Dhakal	SKM	3,848	Prem Das Rai	SDF	2,016	1,832
28	Upper Burtuk	Tek Nath Dhakal	SKM	5,196	Prem Das Rai	SDF	4,159	1,037
29	Kabi Lungchuk (ST)	Tek Nath Dhakal	SKM	4,509	Prem Das Rai	SDF	4,160	349
30	Djongu (ST)	Prem Das Rai	SDF	4,499	Tek Nath Dhakal	SKM	2,199	2,300
31	Lachen-Mangan (ST)	Prem Das Rai	SDF	3,008	Tek Nath Dhakal	SKM	2,417	591
32	Sangha	N/A						

- NOTE: Sangha Assembly constituency only votes in assembly elections.
