= Sikkim Lok Sabha constituency =

Parliamentary constituency in India

Sikkim SK-1
- Lok Sabha constituency
- Interactive Map Outlining Sikkim Lok Sabha constituency

Constituency details
- Country: India
- Region: Northeast India
- State: Sikkim
- Assembly constituencies: 32
- Established: 1977
- Total electors: 4,64,140
- Reservation: None

Member of Parliament
- 18th Lok Sabha
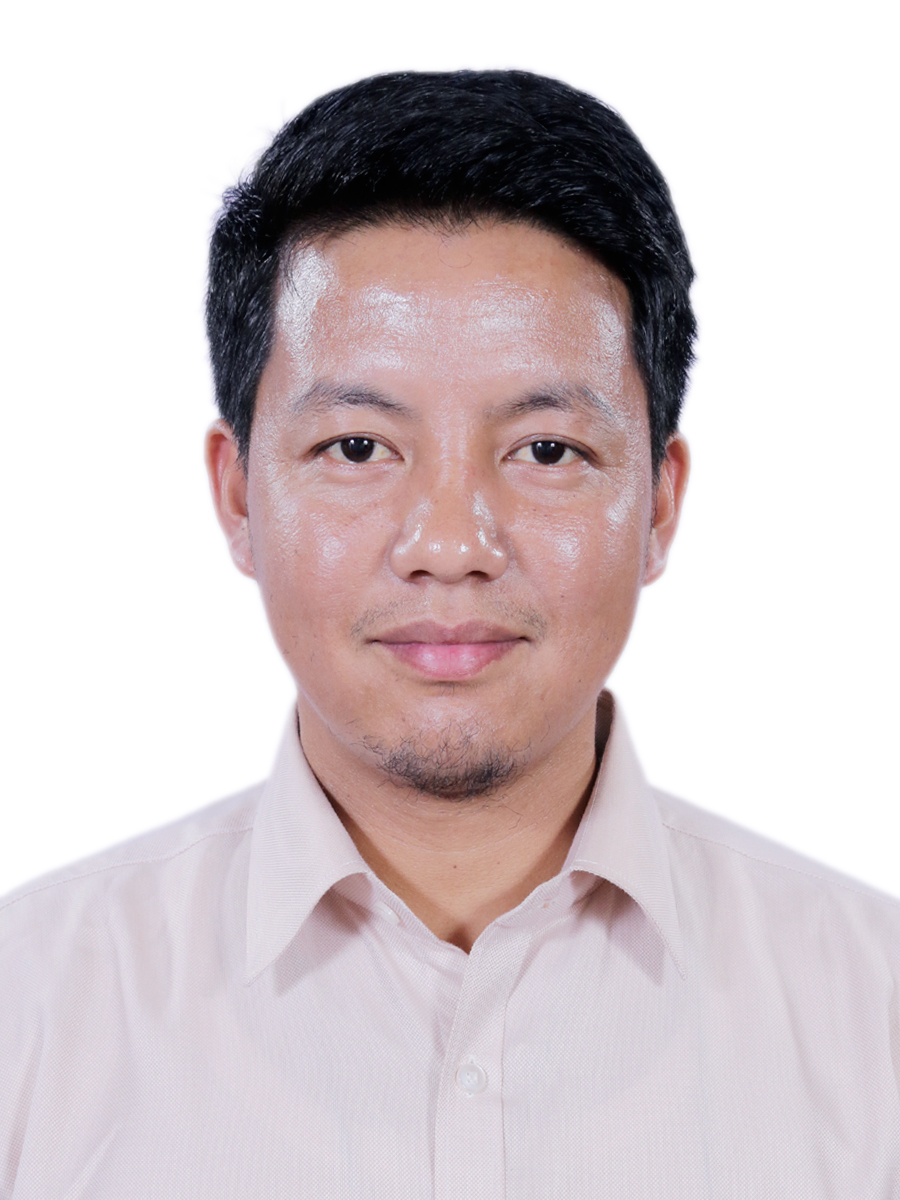
- Incumbent Indra Hang Subba
- Party: SKM
- Alliance: NDA
- Elected year: 2024

Sikkim Lok Sabha constituency is a Lok Sabha (lower house of the Indian parliament) constituency which covers the entire area of the state of Sikkim.

Sikkim participated in its first general elections in 1977 after joining the Union in 1975. Its first member of parliament (MP) was Chatra Bahadur Chhetri of the Indian National Congress who was elected unopposed. The current MP is Indra Hang Subba of Sikkim Krantikari Morcha, who has represented the constituency since 2019. He was re-elected in 2024.

Most Successful parties from Sikkim Lok Sabha
1. SDF (6 Times) (46.0%)
2. SSP(3 Times) (23.0%)
3. SKM(2 Times) (15.0%)
4. SJP(1 Time) (8.00%)
5. INC(1 Time) (8.00%)

== Assembly Segments ==
Since Sikkim has only one Lok Sabha constituency, it comprises all 32 Assembly constituencies of the state.

#	Name	Reserved for (SC/BL/None)	District	MLA	Party
1	Yoksam–Tashiding	BL	Gyalshing	Tshering Thendup Bhutia	SKM
2	Yangthang	None	Gyalshing	Bhim Hang Limboo	SKM
3	Maneybong–Dentam	None	Gyalshing	Sudesh Kumar Subba	SKM
4	Gyalshing–Barnyak	None	Gyalshing	Lok Nath Sharma	SKM
5	Rinchenpong	BL	Soreng	Erung Tenzing Lepcha	SKM
6	Daramdin	BL	Soreng	Mingma Narbu Sherpa	SKM
7	Soreng–Chakung	None	Soreng	Aditya Tamang	SKM
8	Salghari–Zoom	SC	Soreng	Madan Cintury	SKM
9	Barfung	BL	Namchi	Rikshal Dorjee Bhutia	SKM
10	Poklok–Kamrang	None	Namchi	Bhoj Raj Rai	SKM
11	Namchi–Singhithang	None	Namchi	Satish Chandra Rai	SKM
12	Melli	None	Namchi	Nar Bahadur Pradhan	SKM
13	Namthang–Rateypani	None	Namchi	Sanjit Kharel	SKM
14	Temi–Namphing	None	Namchi	Bedu Singh Panth	SKM
15	Rangang–Yangang	None	Namchi	Raj Kumari Thapa	SKM
16	Tumin–Lingee	BL	Namchi	Samdup Tshering Bhutia	SKM
17	Khamdong–Singtam	None	Gangtok	Nar Bahadur Dahal	SKM
18	West Pendam	SC	Pakyong	Lall Bahadur Das	SKM
19	Rhenock	None	Pakyong	Prem Singh Tamang	SKM
20	Chujachen	None	Pakyong	Puran Kumar Gurung	SKM
21	Gnathang–Machong	BL	Pakyong	Pamin Lepcha	SKM
22	Namchaybong	None	Pakyong	Raju Basnet	SKM
23	Shyari	BL	Gangtok	Tenzing Norbu Lamtha	SKM
24	Martam–Rumtek	BL	Gangtok	Sonam Venchungpa	SKM
25	Upper Tadong	None	Gangtok	G.T. Dhungel	SKM
26	Arithang	None	Gangtok	Arun Kumar Upreti	SKM
27	Gangtok	BL	Gangtok	Delay Namgyal Barfungpa	SKM
28	Upper Burtuk	None	Gangtok	Kala Rai	SKM
29	Kabi–Lungchok	BL	Mangan	Thenlay Tshering Bhutia	SKM
30	Djongu	BL	Mangan	Pintso Namgyal Lepcha	SKM
31	Lachen–Mangan	BL	Mangan	Samdup Lepcha	SKM
32	Sangha	Sangha	Buddhist Monasteries	Sonam Lama	SKM

== Members of Parliament ==
Election	Member	Party
1977	Chhatra Bahadur Chhetri	Indian National Congress
1980	Pahal Man Subba	Sikkim Janata Parishad
1984	Nar Bahadur Bhandari	Independent
1985^	Dil Kumari Bhandari	Sikkim Sangram Parishad
1989	Nandu Thapa	Sikkim Sangram Parishad
1991	Dil Kumari Bhandari	Sikkim Sangram Parishad
1996	Bhim Prasad Dahal	Sikkim Democratic Front
1998	Bhim Prasad Dahal	Sikkim Democratic Front
1999	Bhim Prasad Dahal	Sikkim Democratic Front
2004	Nakul Das Rai	Sikkim Democratic Front
2009	Prem Das Rai	Sikkim Democratic Front
2014	Prem Das Rai	Sikkim Democratic Front
2019	Indra Hang Subba	Sikkim Krantikari Morcha
2024	Indra Hang Subba	Sikkim Krantikari Morcha

^By Poll

== Election results ==
Vote share of Winning candidates
2024	42.71%
2019	47.46%
2014	52.98%
2009	63.30%
2004	69.84%
1999	52.56%
1998	65.72%
1996	72.15%
1991	90.12%
1989	68.52%
1985 (by-poll)	0.00%
1984	68.50%
1980	61.65%
1977	0.00%

=== 2024 ===
2024 Indian general election: Sikkim
Party	Candidate	Votes	%	±%
SKM	Indra Hang Subba	164,396	42.71	
CAP-S	Bharat Basnett	83,566	21.71	
SDF	Prem Das Rai	77,171	20.05	
IND	Laten Tshering Sherpa	21,263	5.52	
BJP	Dinesh Chandra Nepal	19,035	4.95	
SRP	Kharga Bhadur Rai	4,799	1.25	
IND	Sambhu Chettri	4,690	1.22	
NOTA	None of the Above	2,527	0.66	
INC	Gopal Chettri	2,241	0.58	
IND	Nawin Kiran Pradhan	1,166	0.30	
IND	Beena Rai	1,125	0.29	
IND	Ravi Chandra Rai	1,123	0.29	
IND	Shyamal Pal	740	0.19	
IND	Madhukar Dhakal	532	0.14	
IND	Rudra Mani Pradhan	519	0.13	
Majority		80,830	21.00	
Turnout		384,893	82.93	
SKM hold		Swing		

=== 2019 ===
2019 Indian general election: Sikkim
Party	Candidate	Votes	%	±%
SKM	Indra Hang Subba	166,922	47.46	
SDF	Dek Bahadur Katwal	154,489	43.92	
BJP	Laten Tshering Sherpa	16,572	4.71	
INC	Bharat Basnett	3,990	1.13	
NOTA	None of the Above	2,279	0.65	
IND	2 Independent Candidates	2,600	0.74	
OTH	5 Other Party Candidates	4,894	1.39	
Majority		12,433	3.54	
Turnout		353,415	81.41	
Swing to SKM from SDF		Swing		

=== 2014 ===
2014 Indian general election: Sikkim
Party	Candidate	Votes	%	±%
SDF	Prem Das Rai	163,698	52.98	▼10.32
SKM	Tek Nath Dhakal	121,956	39.47	
BJP	Nar Bahadur Khatiwada	7,279	2.36	▲0.59
INC	Akar Dhoj Limbu	7,189	2.33	▼27.26
NOTA	None of the above	4,332	1.40	
AAP	Kaushal Rai	2,541	0.82	
AITC	Nakul Das Rai	1,972	0.64	
Majority		41,742	13.51	▼20.20
Turnout		308,967	83.37	▲2.37
SDF hold		Swing		

=== 2009 ===
2009 Indian general election: Sikkim
Party	Candidate	Votes	%	±%
SDF	Prem Das Rai	159,351	63.30	
INC	Kharananda Upreti	74,483	29.59	
SHRP	Tara Kr. Pradhan	4,639	1.84	
BJP	Padam Bdr. Chettri	4,458	1.77	
IND	Atri Ram Chandra Poudyal	3,687	1.46	
SJEP (Note: Sikkim Jan-Ekta Party)	Bhim Subba	2,849	1.13	
SGPP (Note: Sikkim Gorkha Prajatantric Party)	Nar Bahadur Khatiwada	2,284	0.91	
Majority		84,868	33.71	
Turnout		251,751	81.00	
SDF hold		Swing		

=== 2004 ===
2004 Indian general election: Sikkim
Party	Candidate	Votes	%	±%
SDF	Nakul Das Rai	153,409	69.84	
INC	Biraj Adhikari	60,258	27.43	
SSP	Rajendra Pd. Uprety	3,216	1.46	
SHRP	Tara Kumar Pradhan	2,765	1.26	
Majority		93,151	42.41	
Turnout		219,648	77.95	
SDF hold		Swing		

=== 1999 ===
1999 Indian general election: Sikkim
Party	Candidate	Votes	%	±%
SDF	Bhim Pd. Dahal	107,828	52.56	
SSP	Satish Chandra Rai	86,466	42.15	
INC	Somnath Poudyal	9,762	4.76	
IND	Youaraj Rai	1,077	0.53	
Majority		21,362	10.41	
Turnout		208,670	81.71	
SDF hold		Swing		

=== 1998 ===
1998 Indian general election: Sikkim
Party	Candidate	Votes	%	±%
SDF	Bhim Pd. Dahal	102,440	65.72	
INC	Sanchaman Subba	51,611	33.11	
IND	Om Prakash Bhandari	1,820	1.17	
Majority		50,829	32.61	
Turnout		158,787	67.14	
SDF hold		Swing		

=== 1996 ===
1996 Indian general election: Sikkim
Party	Candidate	Votes	%	±%
SDF	Bhim Prasad Dahal	124,218	72.15	
SSP	Nar Bahadur Bhandari	42,175	24.50	
IND	Nandalal Gurung	4,263	2.48	
IND	Dhan Bahadur Tamang	436	0.25	
IND	Krishna Chandra Pradhan	421	0.24	
IND	Nabin Chandra Subba	410	0.24	
IND	Bhagwan Prasad	251	0.15	
Majority		82,043	47.65	
Turnout		177,440	77.43	
Swing to SDF from SSP		Swing		

=== 1991 ===
1991 Indian general election: Sikkim
Party	Candidate	Votes	%	±%
SSP	Dil Kumari Bhandari	103,970	90.12	
IND	Phur Tshering Lepcha	3,759	3.26	
CPI(M)	Dukanath Nepal	3,372	2.92	
IND	Bharat Basnett	2,688	2.33	
IND	Kharga Bhaadur Subba	867	0.75	
IND	Mandadara Sharma	536	0.46	
IND	Yognidhi Bhandari	181	0.16	
Majority		100,211	86.86	
Turnout		118,502	58.75	
SSP hold		Swing		

=== 1989 ===
1989 Indian general election: Sikkim
Party	Candidate	Votes	%	±%
SSP	Nandu Thapa	91,608	68.52	
INC	Dil Kumari Bhandari	28,822	21.56	
RIS	Ram Chandra Poudyal	12,858	9.62	
IND	Sonam Topgyal Gensapa	411	0.31	
Majority		62,786	46.96	
Turnout		138,698	72.01	
SSP hold		Swing		

=== 1985 by-election ===
By-election: Sikkim
Party	Candidate	Votes	%	±%
SSP	Dil Kumari Bhandari	Unopposed		
Majority		Uncontested		
Turnout		0	0.00	
Swing to SSP from Independent		Swing		

=== 1984 ===
1984 Indian general election: Sikkim
Party	Candidate	Votes	%	±%
IND	Nar Bahadur Bhandari	56,614	68.50	
INC	Pahalman Subba	21,327	25.81	
IND	Bishnu Kumar Rai	1,717	2.08	
IND	Lal Bhadur Basnet	936	1.13	
CPI	Bhim Bahadur Mishra	843	1.02	
JP	Ashok Kumar Subba	604	0.73	
IND	Phur Tshering Lepcha	495	0.60	
IND	Baldeoram Harijan	110	0.13	
Majority		35,287	42.69	
Turnout		86,024	57.64	
Swing to Independent from SJP		Swing		

=== 1980 ===
1980 Indian general election: Sikkim
Party	Candidate	Votes	%	±%
SJP	Pahal Man Subba	31,750	61.65	
SC (R)	R. C. Paudyal	11,632	22.59	
SPC	Indra Bahadur Rai	5,125	9.95	
IND	Ram Prasad Sharma	1,073	2.08	
INC(U)	Kharananda Adhikari	943	1.83	
IND	Ashok Kumar Subba	801	1.56	
IND	Damber Kumari Pradhan	179	0.35	
Majority		20,118	39.06	
Turnout		52,895	44.74	
Swing to SJP from INC		Swing		

=== 1977 ===
In the first election after Sikkim joined the Union, Indian National Congress candidate, Chhatra Bahadur Chhetri was elected unopposed.

1977 Indian general election: Sikkim
Party	Candidate	Votes	%	±%
INC	Chatra Bahadur Chhetri	Unopposed		
Majority		Uncontested		
Turnout		0	0.00	
INC win (new seat)				

== See also ==
- List of constituencies of the Lok Sabha
