= First Tamang ministry =

- Ministry of Sikkim
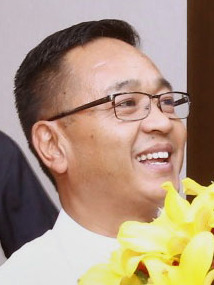
- Prem Singh Tamang; Hon'ble Chief Minister of Sikkim
- Date formed: 27 May 2019
- Date dissolved: 10 June 2024

People and organisations
- Head of state: Governor Lakshman Acharya
- Head of government: Prem Singh Tamang
- Total no. of members: 11
- Member parties: Sikkim Krantikari Morcha
- Status in legislature: Majority
- Opposition party: Sikkim Democratic Front (Since May 2019)

History
- Election: 2019
- Legislature term: 5 years
- Predecessor: Chamling ministry
- Successor: Second Tamang ministry

This is a list of ministers from Prem Singh Tamang cabinet starting from 27 May 2019.

Tamang is the leader of Sikkim Krantikari Morcha, who was sworn in as the 6th Chief Minister of Sikkim on 27 May 2019.

== Council of Ministers ==
S.No	Name	Constituency	Department	Party
1.	Prem Singh Tamang; Chief Minister	Poklok-Kamrang	Excise Department; Finance Department; Home Department; Planning & Development Department; Other departments not allocated to a Minister.	SKM
Cabinet Ministers
2.	Kunga Nima Lepcha	Shyari (BL)	Education Department; Land Revenue & Disaster Management Department; Law Department; Sports & Youth Affairs Department	SKM
3.	Sonam Lama	Sangha	Cooperation Department; Ecclesiastical Department; Rural Development Department	SKM
4.	Bedu Singh Panth	Temi Namphing	Commerce & Industries Department; Information & Public Relations Department; Tourism & Civil Aviation Department	SKM
5.	Lok Nath Sharma	Gyalshing Barnyak	Agriculture Department; Animal Husbandry & Veterinary Services Department; Horticulture Department; Labour Department	SKM
6.	Samdup Lepcha	Lachen Mangan (BL)	Roads & Bridges Department	SKM
7.	Mingma Norbu Sherpa	Daramdin	Power Department; Transport Department	SKM
8.	Karma Loday Bhutia	Kabi Lungchuk (BL)	Forest & Environment Department; Mines & Geology Department; Science & Technology Department	SKM
9.	Bhim Hang Limboo	Yangthang	Public Health Engineering Department; Skill Development Department; Water Resources Department	SKM
10.	Sanjit Kharel	Namthang Rateypani	Buildings & Housing Department; Social Welfare Department; Women & Child Development Department	SKM
11.	Lall Bahadur Das	West Pendam	Food & Civil Supplies Department; Urban Development Department	SKM
12.	Bishnu Kumar Sharma	Rhenock	Culture; Printing & Stationaries	SKM

== See also ==
- Government of Sikkim
- Sikkim Legislative Assembly
