= 2024 Indian general election in Sikkim =

Indian political election in Sikkim

- 19 April 2024

Sole seat from Sikkim in the Lok Sabha
- Opinion polls
- Turnout: 79.88% (▼1.5%)
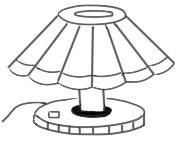

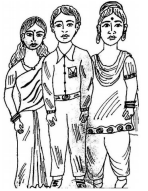

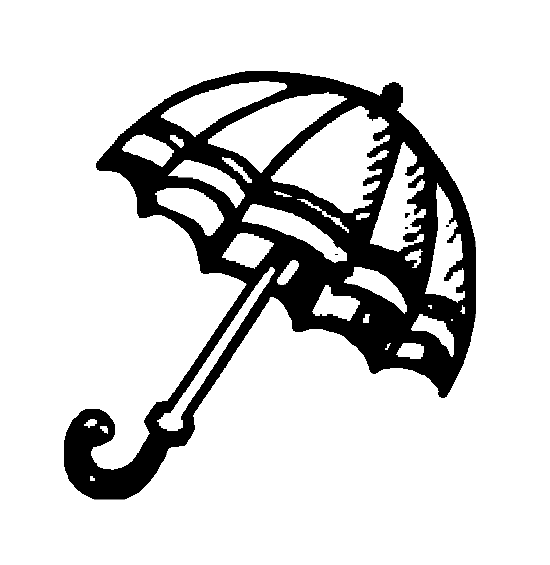
	First party	Second party	Third party
Leader	Indra Hang Subba	Bharat Basnett	Prem Das Rai
Party	SKM	CAP-S	SDF
Alliance	NDA
Leader since	2019	2024	2014
Leader's seat	Sikkim	Sikkim	Sikkim
Last election	47.23%, 1 seat	new	43.71%, 0 seat
Seats won	1	0	0
Seat change	Steady	Steady	Steady
Popular vote	164,396	83,566	77,171
Percentage	42.71%	21.71%	20.05%
Swing	▼4.52%	New	▼23.66%
- Result Map of the 2024 general election in Sikkim
Prime Minister before election
Narendra Modi
BJP
Prime Minister after election
Narendra Modi
BJP

The 2024 Indian general election was held in Sikkim on 19 April 2024 to elect 1 member of the 18th Lok Sabha. Legislative assembly was held simultaneously with the general election.

== Election schedule ==
Poll event	Phase
Poll event	I
Notification date	20 March
Last date for filing nomination	27 March
Scrutiny of nomination	28 March
Last Date for withdrawal of nomination	30 March
Date of poll	19 April
Date of counting of votes/Result	4 June 2024
No. of constituencies	1

== Parties and alliances ==
=== Sikkim Krantikari Morcha ===
Sikkim Krantikari Morcha

Party	Flag	Symbol	Leader	Seats contested
Sikkim Krantikari Morcha			Indra Hang Subba	1

=== Sikkim Democratic Front ===
Sikkim Democratic Front

Party	Flag	Symbol	Leader	Seats contested
Sikkim Democratic Front			Prem Das Rai	1

=== Bharatiya Janata Party ===
Bharatiya Janata Party

Party	Flag	Symbol	Leader	Seats contested
Bharatiya Janata Party			Dinesh Chandra Nepal	1

=== Indian National Developmental Inclusive Alliance ===
Indian National Developmental Inclusive Alliance

Party	Flag	Symbol	Leader	Seats contested
Indian National Congress			Gopal Chettri	1

=== Others ===
Party	Symbol	Seats contested
Sikkim Republican Party		1
Citizen Action Party – Sikkim		1

== Candidates ==
Constituency									
Constituency		SKM		SDF		BJP		INDIA	
1.	Sikkim	SKM	Indra Hang Subba	SDF	Prem Das Rai	BJP	Dinesh Chandra Nepal	INC	Gopal Chettri

== Surveys and polls ==
=== Opinion polls ===
Polling agency	Date published	Margin of error				Lead
Polling agency	Date published	Margin of error	SDF	NDA	INDIA	Lead
ABP News-CVoter	March 2024	±5%	0	1	0	NDA
Times Now-ETG	December 2023	±3%	0	1	0	NDA
India TV-CNX	October 2023	±3%	0	1	0	NDA
Times Now-ETG	September 2023	±3%	0	1	0	NDA
Times Now-ETG	August 2023	±3%	0	1	0	NDA

=== Exit polls ===
Polling agency					Lead
Polling agency	NDA	SDF	INDIA	Others	Lead
Actual results	1	0	0	0	NDA

== Results ==
=== Results by alliance or party ===
Alliance/ Party		Popular vote			Seats		
Alliance/ Party		Votes	%	±pp	Contested	Won	+/−
NDA	SKM	1,64,396	42.71%	▼4.52	1	1	Steady
NDA	BJP	19,035	4.95%	▲0.95	1	0	Steady
CAP-S		83,566	21.71	new	1	0	Steady
SDF		77,171	20.05	▼23.66	1	0	Steady
SRP		4,799	1.25	new	1	0	Steady
INDIA	INC	2,241	0.58%	▼0.52	1	0	Steady
IND		31,158	8.08		8	0	Steady
NOTA		2,527	0.66				
Total		3,84,893	100%	-	14	1	-

=== Results by constituency ===
Constituency		Turnout	Winner					Runner-up					Margin
Constituency		Turnout	Party	Alliance	Candidate	Votes	%	Party	Alliance	Candidate	Votes	%	Margin
1	Sikkim	79.88%▼	SKM	NDA	Indra Hang Subba	1,64,396	42.71%	CAP-S	None	Bharat Basnett	83,566	21.71%	80,830

== Assembly segments wise lead of Parties ==
2024 Sikkim Lok Sabha Elections Assembly Wise Map

Party	Assembly segments	Current Position in Assembly
Sikkim Krantikari Morcha	31 (Note: Sangha Assembly constituency only votes in the assembly elections.)	32
Total	32	

== See also ==
- 2024 Indian general election in Tamil Nadu
- 2024 Indian general election in Telangana
- 2024 Indian general election in Tripura
