= Bhim Hang Limboo =

Indian politician

Minister of Labour of Sikkim
- Incumbent
- Assumed office 11 June 2024
- Governor: Lakshman Acharya; Om Prakash Mathur
- Chief Minister: Prem Singh Tamang
- Preceded by: Lok Nath Sharma

Minister of Buildings and Housing of Sikkim
- Incumbent
- Assumed office 11 June 2024
- Governor: Lakshman Acharya; Om Prakash Mathur
- Chief Minister: Prem Singh Tamang
- Preceded by: Sanjit Kharel

Minister of Skill Development of Sikkim
- In office 27 May 2019 – 10 June 2024
- Governor: Lakshman Acharya; Ganga Prasad
- Chief Minister: Prem Singh Tamang
- Preceded by: Pawan Kumar Chamling
- Succeeded by: Prem Singh Tamang

Minister of Public Health Engineering and Water Resources of Sikkim
- In office 27 May 2019 – 10 June 2024
- Governor: Lakshman Acharya; Ganga Prasad
- Chief Minister: Prem Singh Tamang
- Preceded by: Tulshi Devi Rai
- Succeeded by: Sonam Lama

Member of Sikkim Legislative Assembly
- Incumbent
- Assumed office May 2019
- Preceded by: Chandra Maya Limboo
- Constituency: Yangthang

Personal details
- Born: Bhim Hang Limboo; 8 June 1988 (age 38) Darap, West Sikkim
- Party: Sikkim Krantikari Morcha
- Spouse: Aita Maya Limboo
- Children: No
- Education: Graduation from Tadong College
- Profession: Social Worker, Farmer

Bhim Hang Limboo is an Indian politician. He was elected to the Sikkim Legislative Assembly from Yangthang in the 2019 Sikkim Legislative Assembly election and 2024 Sikkim Legislative Assembly election as a member of the Sikkim Krantikari Morcha. He is Minister of Public health engineering and Water security, Water resources & River development in P. S. Golay Cabinet.

== Electoral performance ==
Election	Constituency	Party	Result	Votes %	Opposition Candidate	Opposition Party	Opposition vote %	Ref
2019	Yangthang	SKM	Won	48.47%	Dal Bdr. Subba	SDF	48.03%	
