= Second Tamang ministry =

Second Prem Singh Tamang ministry

- 12th Ministry of Sikkim

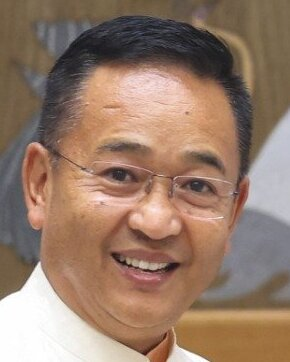
- Prem Singh Tamang; Hon'ble Chief Minister of Sikkim
- Date formed: 10 June 2024

People and organisations
- Governor: Om Prakash Mathur
- Chief Minister: Prem Singh Tamang
- Member parties: Sikkim Krantikari Morcha
- Status in legislature: Majority 100%
- Opposition party: None

History
- Election: 2024
- Legislature term: 5 years
- Predecessor: First Tamang ministry

This is a list of ministers from Prem Singh Tamang cabinet starting from 10 June 2024.

Tamang is the leader of Sikkim Krantikari Morcha, who was sworn in as the 6th Chief Minister of Sikkim on 10 June 2024 for the second time.

== Council of Ministers ==
Source
S.No	Name	Constituency	Department	Party
1.	Prem Singh Tamang; Chief Minister	Rhenock	Home Department; Finance Department; Planning and Development Department; Department of Personnel; Power Department; Excise Department; Land Revenue and Disaster Management Department; Transport Department; Information and Public Relations Department; Information Technology Department; Skill Development Department; Other departments not allotted to other Ministers.	SKM
Cabinet Ministers
2.	Sonam Lama	Sangha	Public Health Engineering Department; Water Resources Department; Ecclesiastical Department	SKM
3.	Arun Kumar Upreti	Arithang	Rural Development Department; Cooperation Department	SKM
4.	Samdup Lepcha	Lachen-Mangan	Social Welfare Department; Women and Child Development Department; Printing and Stationery Department	SKM
5.	Bhim Hang Limboo	Yangthang	Buildings & Housing Department; Labour Department	SKM
6.	Bhoj Raj Rai	Poklok-Kamrang	Urban Development Department; Food & Civil Supplies Department	SKM
7.	G.T. Dhungel	Upper Tadong	Health & Family Welfare Department; Culture Department	SKM
8.	Puran Kumar Gurung	Chujachen	Agriculture Department; Horticulture Department; Animal Husbandry & Veterinary Services Department; Fisheries Development Department	SKM
9.	Pintso Namgyal Lepcha	Djongu	Forest & Environment Department; Mines and Geology Department; Science & Technology Department	SKM
10.	Nar Bahadur Dahal	Khamdong-Singtam	Roads & Bridges Department	SKM
11.	Raju Basnet	Namchaybong	Education Department; Sports & Youth Affairs Department; Law Department; Parliamentary Affairs Department	SKM
12.	Tshering Thendup Bhutia	Yoksam–Tashiding	Tourism and Civil Aviation Department; Commerce & Industries Department	SKM

== Demographics ==
Ministers by District

S.No	District	Ministers	Name of Ministers
1	Gyalshing	2	Bhim Hang Limboo; Tshering Thendup Bhutia
2	Soreng	-	-
3	Namchi	1	Bhoj Raj Rai
4	Gangtok	3	Arun Kumar Upreti; G.T. Dhungel; Nar Bahadur Dahal
5	Pakyong	3	Prem Singh Tamang (Chief Minister); Puran Kumar Gurung; Raju Basnet
6	Mangan	2	Samdup Lepcha; Pintso Namgyal Lepcha
7	Sangha	1	Sonam Lama
