= Samdup Lepcha =

Indian politician

- सामडूप लेप्चा

Minister of Social Welfare of Sikkim
- Incumbent
- Assumed office 11 June 2024
- Governor: Lakshman Acharya; Om Prakash Mathur
- Chief Minister: Prem Singh Tamang
- Preceded by: Sanjit Kharel

Minister of Printing and Stationery of Sikkim
- Incumbent
- Assumed office 11 June 2024
- Governor: Lakshman Acharya; Om Prakash Mathur
- Chief Minister: Prem Singh Tamang
- Preceded by: Bishnu Kumar Sharma

Minister of Women and Children Development of Sikkim
- Incumbent
- Assumed office 11 June 2024
- Governor: Lakshman Acharya; Om Prakash Mathur
- Chief Minister: Prem Singh Tamang
- Preceded by: Sanjit Kharel

Minister of Roads and Bridges of Sikkim
- In office 27 May 2019 – 10 June 2024
- Governor: Lakshman Acharya; Ganga Prasad
- Chief Minister: Prem Singh Tamang
- Preceded by: Garjaman Gurung
- Succeeded by: Nar Bahadur Dahal

Member of Sikkim Legislative Assembly
- Incumbent
- Assumed office 3 June 2019
- Preceded by: Tshering Wangdi Lepcha
- Constituency: Lachen-Mangan

Personal details
- Born: Samdup Lepcha; 30 October 1964 (age 61) Chungthang, Sikkim
- Party: Sikkim Krantikari Morcha
- Children: Lhakit Lepcha
- Profession: Businessman & Contractor

Samdup Lepcha is an Indian politician. He was elected to the Sikkim Legislative Assembly from Lachen-Mangan. He was reelected winning the 2024 Sikkim Legislative Assembly election.

== Career ==
Lepcha was first elected as an MLA in the 2019 Sikkim Legislative Assembly election as a member of the Sikkim Krantikari Morcha. He was a Minister of Public Works department and Cultural affairs & Heritage in P. S. Golay Cabinet.
