= Sanjit Kharel =

Indian politician (born 1977)

Speaker pro tempore of the Sikkim Legislative Assembly
- In office 11 June 2024 – 12 June 2024
- Governor: Lakshman Acharya
- Chief Minister: Prem Singh Tamang
- Preceded by: Arun Kumar Upreti (as Speaker)
- Succeeded by: Mingma Narbu Sherpa (as Speaker)

Minister of Social Welfare of Sikkim
- In office 27 May 2019 – 10 June 2024
- Governor: Ganga Prasad; Lakshman Acharya
- Chief Minister: Prem Singh Tamang
- Preceded by: Tulshi Devi Rai
- Succeeded by: Samdup Lepcha

Minister of Buildings and Housing of Sikkim
- In office 27 May 2019 – 10 June 2024
- Governor: Ganga Prasad; Lakshman Acharya
- Chief Minister: Prem Singh Tamang
- Preceded by: Dorjee Tshering Lepcha
- Succeeded by: Bhim Hang Limboo

Minister of Women and Child Development of Sikkim
- In office 27 May 2019 – 10 June 2024
- Governor: Ganga Prasad; Lakshman Acharya
- Chief Minister: Prem Singh Tamang
- Preceded by: Pawan Kumar Chamling
- Succeeded by: Samdup Lepcha

Member of the Sikkim Legislative Assembly
- Incumbent
- Assumed office May 2019
- Preceded by: Tilu Gurung
- Constituency: Namthang–Rateypani

Personal details
- Born: 14 February 1977 (age 49) Sikkim, India
- Party: Sikkim Krantikari Morcha
- Other political affiliations: National Democratic Alliance
- Profession: Contractor, Social worker

Sanjit Kharel (born 14 February 1977) is an Indian politician. He was elected to the Sikkim Legislative Assembly from Namthang-Rateypani in the 2019 Sikkim Legislative Assembly election 2024 Sikkim Legislative Assembly election as a member of the Sikkim Krantikari Morcha. He is Minister of Social welfare in P. S. Golay Cabinet.
