= Mingma Narbu Sherpa =

Indian politician

12th Speaker of the Sikkim Legislative Assembly
- Incumbent
- Assumed office 12 June 2024
- Governor: Lakshman Acharya; Om Prakash Mathur
- Chief Minister: Prem Singh Tamang
- Deputy Speaker: Raj Kumari Thapa
- Preceded by: Arun Kumar Upreti (Note: Sanjit Kharel acted as Speaker pro tempore until Sherpa's elected as speaker)

Minister of Transport of Sikkim
- In office 27 May 2019 – 10 June 2024
- Governor: Lakshman Acharya; Ganga Prasad
- Chief Minister: Prem Singh Tamang
- Preceded by: Dorjee Tshering Lepcha

Minister of Power of Sikkim
- In office 27 May 2019 – 10 June 2024
- Governor: Lakshman Acharya; Ganga Prasad
- Chief Minister: Prem Singh Tamang
- Preceded by: Dorjee Dazom Bhutia

Member of the Sikkim Legislative Assembly
- Incumbent
- Assumed office May 2019
- Preceded by: Danorbu Sherpa
- Constituency: Daramdin

Personal details
- Born: Mingma Narbu Sherpa; 15 August 1970 (age 56)
- Party: Sikkim Krantikari Morcha
- Spouse: Yanchen Doma Sherpa
- Education: BA, North Bengal University
- Profession: Social Worker

Mingma Narbu Sherpa is an Indian politician. He was elected to the Sikkim Legislative Assembly from Daramdin in the 2019 Sikkim Legislative Assembly election and 2024 Sikkim Legislative Assembly election as a member of the Sikkim Krantikari Morcha. He was Minister of Energy & Power and Labour in P. S. Golay Cabinet.
