= Martam–Rumtek Assembly constituency =

Constituency of the Sikkim legislative assembly in India

Coordinates: 27.262°N 88.555°E

Martam-Rumtek
- Constituency for the Sikkim Legislative Assembly

Constituency details
- Country: India
- Region: Northeast India
- State: Sikkim
- District: Gangtok
- Lok Sabha constituency: Sikkim
- Established: 2008
- Reservation: BL

Member of Legislative Assembly
- 11th Sikkim Legislative Assembly
- Incumbent Sonam Venchungpa
- Party: SKM
- Alliance: NDA
- Elected year: 2024

Martam–Rumtek Assembly constituency is one of the 32 assembly constituencies of Sikkim a north east state of India. Martam-Rumtek is part of Sikkim Lok Sabha constituency. This Constituency is reserved for Scheduled Tribes (ST: Bhutia, Lepcha and Sherpa).

== Members of the Legislative Assembly ==
| Election | Member | Party |
|---|---|---|
| 2009 | Menlom Lepcha | Sikkim Democratic Front |
| 2014 | Mechung Bhutia | Sikkim Krantikari Morcha |
| 2019 | Dorjee Tshering Lepcha | Sikkim Democratic Front |
| 2019 by-election | Sonam Venchungpa | Bharatiya Janata Party |
| 2024 | Sonam Venchungpa | Sikkim Krantikari Morcha |

== Election results ==
=== Assembly Election 2024 ===
2024 Sikkim Legislative Assembly election: Martam–Rumtek
| Party | Candidate | Votes | % | ±% |
|---|---|---|---|---|
| SKM | Sonam Tshering Venchungpa | 8,070 | 54.01% | New |
| SDF | Mechung Bhutia | 5,308 | 35.53% | ▲18.93 |
| BJP | Chewang Dadul Bhutia | 705 | 4.72% | ▼61.57 |
| CAP–Sikkim | Karma Tshering Bhutia | 637 | 4.26% | New |
| NOTA | None of the Above | 132 | 0.88% | ▼0.36 |
| INC | Ganga Lepcha | 89 | 0.60% | New |
| Margin of victory | | 2,762 | 18.49% | ▼31.20 |
| Turnout | | 14,941 | 83.73% | ▲11.01 |
| Registered electors | | 17,844 | | ▲4.84 |
| SKM gain from BJP | | Swing | ▼12.27 | |

=== Assembly by-election 2019 ===
In 2019 Sikkim Legislative Assembly election, Dorjee Tshering Lepcha (D. T. Lepcha) of former ruling SDF won in both Gnathang-Machong and Martam-Rumtek constituencies, so he relinquished Martam-Rumtek seat.

In the by-election, ruling SKM didn't send its candidate to Martam-Rumtek. Meanwhile, former SKM candidate Sonam Tshering Venchungpa moved to opposition BJP, and SKM supported him. In addition, D. T. Lepcha had already moved to BJP in August. Former ruling SDF participated in the Sikkim Legislative Assembly election as the opposition for the first time in 25 years. Opposition SRP sent its candidate to Martam-Rumtek for the first time. Opposition INC boycotted this by-election.

As the result, Sonam Tshering Venchungpa of BJP defeated his nearest rival Nuk Tshering Bhutia of SDF.

2019 Sikkim Legislative Assembly by-election: Martam–Rumtek
| Party | Candidate | Votes | % | ±% |
|---|---|---|---|---|
| BJP | Sonam Venchungpa | 8,204 | 66.28% | ▲60.44 |
| SDF | Nuk Tshering Bhutia | 2,054 | 16.60% | ▼28.81 |
| HSP | Nima Lepcha | 1,235 | 9.98% | New |
| Independent | Mechung Bhutia | 439 | 3.55% | New |
| Independent | Passang Gyali Sherpa | 272 | 2.20% | New |
| SRP | Mingma Tshering Sherpa | 173 | 1.40% | New |
| NOTA | None of the Above | 154 | 1.24% | ▲0.39 |
| Margin of victory | | 6,150 | 49.69% | ▲49.16 |
| Turnout | | 12,377 | 72.72% | ▼8.30 |
| Registered electors | | 17,020 | | ▲0.27 |
| BJP gain from SDF | | Swing | ▲20.88 | |

=== Assembly election 2019 ===
2019 Sikkim Legislative Assembly election: Martam–Rumtek
| Party | Candidate | Votes | % | ±% |
|---|---|---|---|---|
| SDF | Dorjee Tshering Lepcha | 6,244 | 45.40% | ▼0.86 |
| SKM | Sonam Venchungpa | 6,171 | 44.87% | ▼5.37 |
| BJP | Jigdal Chewang Bhutia | 804 | 5.85% | New |
| HSP | Nima Lepcha | 183 | 1.33% | New |
| Independent | Gyaltsen Bhutia | 121 | 0.88% | New |
| NOTA | None of the Above | 118 | 0.86% | New |
| INC | Sonam Tshering Bhutia | 112 | 0.81% | ▼0.70 |
| Margin of victory | | 73 | 0.53% | ▼3.44 |
| Turnout | | 13,753 | 81.02% | ▼2.04 |
| Registered electors | | 16,975 | | ▲16.97 |
| SDF gain from SKM | | Swing | ▼4.84 | |

=== Assembly election 2014 ===
2014 Sikkim Legislative Assembly election: Martam–Rumtek
| Party | Candidate | Votes | % | ±% |
|---|---|---|---|---|
| SKM | Mechung Bhutia | 6,055 | 50.24% | New |
| SDF | Menlom Lepcha | 5,576 | 46.26% | ▼17.78 |
| NOTA | None of the Above | 239 | 1.98% | New |
| INC | Sonam Tshering Bhutia | 183 | 1.52% | ▼28.81 |
| Margin of victory | | 479 | 3.97% | ▼29.74 |
| Turnout | | 12,053 | 83.06% | ▼2.24 |
| Registered electors | | 14,512 | | |
| SKM gain from SDF | | Swing | ▼13.81 | |

=== Assembly election 2009 ===
2009 Sikkim Legislative Assembly election: Martam–Rumtek
| Party | Candidate | Votes | % | ±% |
|---|---|---|---|---|
| SDF | Menlom Lepcha | 6,392 | 64.04% | New |
| INC | Rinzing Namgyal | 3,027 | 30.33% | New |
| BJP | Nima Lepcha | 336 | 3.37% | New |
| Independent | Sonam Tashi Bhutia | 117 | 1.17% | New |
| Sikkim Gorkha Party | Bindu Lepcha | 68 | 0.68% | New |
| Margin of victory | | 3,365 | 33.71% | |
| Turnout | | 9,981 | 85.29% | |
| Registered electors | | 11,702 | | |
| SDF win (new seat) | | | | |

== See also ==
- Rumtek
- Gangtok district
- List of constituencies of Sikkim Legislative Assembly
