= Nakul Das Rai =

Indian politician

Member of parliament
- In office 17 May 2004 – 18 May 2009
- Preceded by: Bhim Prasad Dahal
- Succeeded by: Prem Das Rai
- Constituency: Sikkim

Personal details
- Born: 12 February 1960 (age 66) Ranipool, East Sikkim, Kingdom of Sikkim
- Party: SDF
- Spouse: Krishna Chettri
- Children: 1 son
- As of 16 September, 2006

Nakul Das Rai (born 12 February 1960) was a member of the 14th Lok Sabha of India. He represented the Sikkim constituency and is a member of the Sikkim Krantikari Morcha (SKM) political party.
