= Tenzing Norbu Lamtha =

Indian politician

Member of Sikkim Legislative Assembly
- Incumbent
- Assumed office 1 June 2024
- Preceded by: Kunga Nima Lepcha
- Constituency: Shyari

Tenzing Norbu Lamtha is an Indian politician from Sikkim belonging from the Sikkim Krantikari Morcha. He is a member of the Legislative Assembly in the 11th Sikkim Legislative Assembly. He won over SKM's incumbent candidate Kunga Nima Lepcha with a margin of 1314 votes. He was the sole MLA for SDF in the 2024 Sikkim Legislative Assembly Elections. On 10 July 2024 he formally joined to Sikkim Krantikari Morcha.

== Education ==
He graduated from Board of Technical Education Delhi with a Diploma in Civil Engineering.
