= Namthang–Rateypani Assembly constituency =

Constituency of the Sikkim legislative assembly in India

Coordinates: 27.165°N 88.477°E

Namthang-Rateypani
- Constituency No. 13 for the Sikkim Legislative Assembly

Constituency details
- Country: India
- Region: Northeast India
- State: Sikkim
- District: Namchi
- Lok Sabha constituency: Sikkim
- Established: 2008
- Total electors: 15,451
- Reservation: None

Member of Legislative Assembly
- 11th Sikkim Legislative Assembly
- Incumbent Sanjit Kharel
- Party: SKM
- Alliance: NDA
- Elected year: 2024

Namthang-Rateypani Assembly constituency is one of the 32 assembly constituencies of Sikkim a north east state of India. Namthang-Rateypani is part of Sikkim Lok Sabha constituency.

== Members of the Legislative Assembly ==
Election	Member	Party
2009	Tilu Gurung	Sikkim Democratic Front
2014	Tilu Gurung	Sikkim Democratic Front
2019	Sanjit Kharel	Sikkim Krantikari Morcha
2024	Sanjit Kharel	Sikkim Krantikari Morcha

== Election results ==
=== Assembly Election 2024 ===
2024 Sikkim Legislative Assembly election: Namthang–Rateypani
Party	Candidate	Votes	%	±%
SKM	Sanjit Kharel	8,949	63.46%	▲9.88
SDF	Suman Pradhan	3,344	23.71%	▼19.66
CAP–Sikkim	Hari Chandra Chettri	1,300	9.22%	New
BJP	Janak Kumar Gurung	344	2.44%	New
NOTA	None of the Above	164	1.16%	▲0.47
Margin of victory		5,605	39.75%	▲29.54
Turnout		14,101	85.69%	▲2.99
Registered electors		16,455		▲6.50
SKM hold		Swing	▲9.88	

=== Assembly election 2019 ===
2019 Sikkim Legislative Assembly election: Namthang–Rateypani
Party	Candidate	Votes	%	±%
SKM	Sanjit Kharel	6,848	53.59%	▲10.21
SDF	Birjan Tamang	5,543	43.38%	▼10.46
INC	Sancha Man Chettri	128	1.00%	▲0.03
NOTA	None of the Above	89	0.70%	▼0.29
SRP	Ganga Ram Sharma	83	0.65%	New
Margin of victory		1,305	10.21%	▼0.24
Turnout		12,779	82.71%	▼0.82
Registered electors		15,451		▲16.84
SKM gain from SDF		Swing	▼0.25	

=== Assembly election 2014 ===
2014 Sikkim Legislative Assembly election: Namthang–Rateypani
Party	Candidate	Votes	%	±%
SDF	Tilu Gurung	5,947	53.84%	▼11.92
SKM	Prem Singh Tamang	4,792	43.38%	New
NOTA	None of the Above	109	0.99%	New
INC	Dik Maya Basnet	107	0.97%	▼29.53
AITC	Yasodha Barakoti	91	0.82%	New
Margin of victory		1,155	10.46%	▼24.81
Turnout		11,046	83.53%	▲0.83
Registered electors		13,224		▲20.10
SDF hold		Swing	▼11.92	

=== Assembly election 2009 ===
2009 Sikkim Legislative Assembly election: Namthang–Rateypani
Party	Candidate	Votes	%	±%
SDF	Tilu Gurung	5,988	65.76%	New
INC	Suk Bahadur Tamang	2,777	30.50%	New
Sikkim Gorkha Party	Arun Kumar Gurung	132	1.45%	New
Independent	Manoj Uprety	101	1.11%	New
Independent	Abir Singh Subba	60	0.66%	New
Sikkim Jan-Ekta Party	Sanjukta Rai	48	0.53%	New
Margin of victory		3,211	35.26%	
Turnout		9,106	82.70%	
Registered electors		11,011		
SDF win (new seat)				

== See also ==
- Namthang
- Namchi district
- List of constituencies of Sikkim Legislative Assembly
