= 2024 Sikkim Legislative Assembly election =

Election in Sikkim

- 19 April 2024

32 seats in the Sikkim Legislative Assembly 17 seats needed for a majority
- Turnout: 79.88% (▼1.55%) (Note: does not include postal ballots)
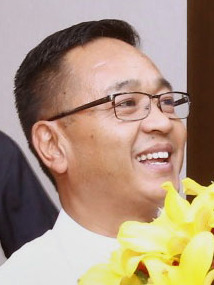

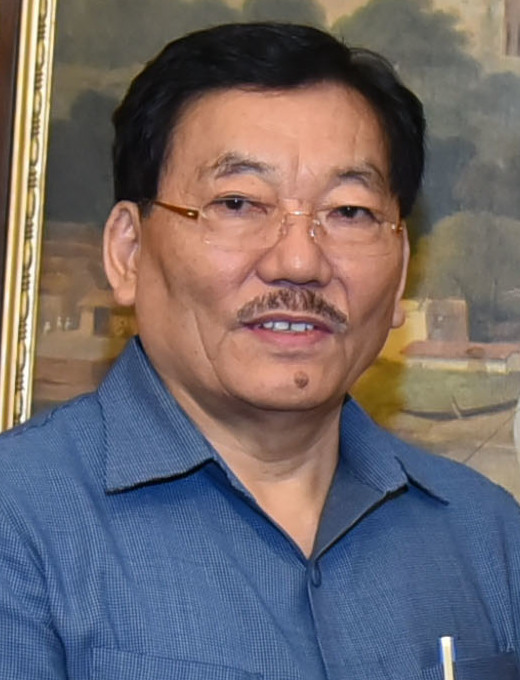
	Majority party	Minority party
Leader	Prem Singh Tamang	Pawan Kumar Chamling
Party	SKM	SDF
Alliance	NDA
Leader's seat	Rhenock (retained), Soreng–Chakung (vacated)	Poklok–Kamrang, Namchaybong (both lost)
Last election	47.03%, 17 seats	47.63%, 15 seats
Seats won	31	1
Seat change	▲14	▼14
Popular vote	225,068	105,503
Percentage	58.38%	27.37%
Swing	▲13.35%	▼25.26%

- Structure of the Sikkim Legislative Assembly after the election
Chief Minister before election
Prem Singh Tamang
SKM
Chief Minister after election
Prem Singh Tamang
SKM

Legislative Assembly elections were held in Sikkim on 19 April 2024 to elect the 32 members of the 11th Sikkim Assembly. The votes were counted and the results were declared on 2 June 2024. The incumbent Sikkim Krantikari Morcha government, led by chief minister Prem Singh Tamang, won re-election to a second term.

== Background ==
The tenure of Sikkim Legislative Assembly was scheduled to end on 2 June 2024. The previous assembly elections were held in April 2019. After the election, Sikkim Krantikari Morcha formed the state government, with Prem Singh Tamang becoming the Chief Minister.

== Schedule ==
The schedule of the election was announced by the Election Commission of India on 16 March 2024.

Poll event	Schedule
Notification date	20 March 2024
Last date for filing nomination	27 March 2024
Scrutiny of nomination	28 March 2024
Last date for withdrawal of nomination	30 March 2024
Date of poll	19 April 2024
Date of Counting of Votes	2 June 2024

== Parties and alliances ==
Party	Flag	Symbol	Leader	Seats contested
Sikkim Krantikari Morcha			Prem Singh Tamang	32
Sikkim Democratic Front			Pawan Chamling	32
Bharatiya Janata Party			Dilli Ram Thapa	31
Indian National Congress			Gopal Chettri	12
Citizen Action Party – Sikkim			Ganesh Kumar Rai	30

== Candidates ==
List of candidates
District	Constituency							
District	Constituency		SKM		SDF		BJP	
Gyalshing	1	Yoksam–Tashiding (BL)	SKM	Tshering Thendup Bhutia	SDF	Meewang Gyatso Bhutia	BJP	Kunzang Sherab Bhutia
Gyalshing	2	Yangthang	SKM	Bhim Hang Limboo	SDF	Kesham Limboo	BJP	Sancha Man Limboo
Gyalshing	3	Maneybong–Dentam	SKM	Sudesh Kumar Subba	SDF	Tika Ram Chettri	BJP	Narendra Kumar Subba
Gyalshing	4	Gyalshing–Barnyak	SKM	Lok Nath Sharma	SDF	Tika Prasad Sharma	BJP	Bharat Kumar Sharma
Soreng	5	Rinchenpong (BL)	SKM	Erung Tenzing Lepcha	SDF	Norden Bhutia	BJP	Sancho Lepcha
Soreng	6	Daramdin (BL)	SKM	Mingma Narbu Sherpa	SDF	Pem Norbu Sherpa	BJP	Phurba Dorjee Sherpa
Soreng	7	Soreng–Chakung	SKM	Prem Singh Tamang	SDF	Akar Dhoj Limbu	BJP	Purna Singh Subba
Soreng	8	Salghari–Zoom (SC)	SKM	Madan Cintury	SDF	Janga Bir Darnal	BJP	Pahal Man Kami
Namchi	9	Barfung (BL)	SKM	Rikshal Dorjee Bhutia	SDF	Bhaichung Bhutia	BJP	Tashi Dadul Bhutia
Namchi	10	Poklok–Kamrang	SKM	Bhoj Raj Rai	SDF	Pawan Kumar Chamling	BJP	Arjun Rai
Namchi	11	Namchi–Singhithang	SKM	Krishna Kumari Rai	SDF	Bimal Rai	BJP	Aruna Manger
Namchi	12	Melli	SKM	Nar Bahadur Pradhan	SDF	Nirmal Kumar Pradhan	BJP	Yogen Rai
Namchi	13	Namthang–Rateypani	SKM	Sanjeet Kharel	SDF	Suman Pradhan	BJP	Janak Kumar Gurung
Namchi	14	Temi–Namphing	SKM	Bedu Singh Panth	SDF	Suman Kumar Tewari	BJP	Bhupendra Giri
Namchi	15	Rangang–Yangang	SKM	Raj Kumari Thapa	SDF	Mani Kumar Subba	BJP	Gopi Das Pokhrel
Namchi	16	Tumin–Lingee (BL)	SKM	Samdup Tshering Bhutia	SDF	Norzong Lepcha	BJP	Passang Gyali Sherpa
Gangtok	17	Khamdong–Singtam	SKM	Nar Bahadur Dahal	SDF	Mani Kumar Sharma	BJP	Chetan Sapkota
Pakyong	18	West Pendam (SC)	SKM	Lall Bahadur Das	SDF	Anup Thatal	BJP	Bhupal Baraily
Pakyong	19	Rhenock	SKM	Prem Singh Tamang	SDF	Somnath Poudyal	BJP	Prem Chhetri
Pakyong	20	Chujachen	SKM	Puran Kumar Gurung	SDF	Mani Kumar Gurung	BJP	Duk Nath Nepal
Pakyong	21	Gnathang–Machong (BL)	SKM	Pamin Lepcha	SDF	Tshering Wangdi Lepcha	BJP	Sangay Gyatso Bhutia
Pakyong	22	Namchaybong	SKM	Raju Basnet	SDF	Pawan Kumar Chamling	BJP	Pooja Sharma
Gangtok	23	Shyari	SKM	Kunga Nima Lepcha	SDF	Tenzing Norbu Lamtha	BJP	Pempo Dorjee Lepcha
Gangtok	24	Martam–Rumtek (BL)	SKM	Sonam Venchungpa	SDF	Mechung Bhutia	BJP	Chewang Dadul Bhutia
Gangtok	25	Upper Tadong	SKM	Gay Tshering Dhungel	SDF	Chandra Bahadur Chettri	BJP	Niren Bhandari
Gangtok	26	Arithang	SKM	Arun Kumar Upreti	SDF	Ashis Rai	BJP	Udai Gurung
Gangtok	27	Gangtok	SKM	Delay Namgyal Barfungpa	SDF	Pintso Chopel Lepcha	BJP	Pema Wangyal Rinzing
Gangtok	28	Upper Burtuk	SKM	Kala Rai	SDF	Dil Bahadur Thapa Manger	BJP	Dilli Ram Thapa
Mangan	29	Kabi–Lungchok (BL)	SKM	Thenlay Tshering Bhutia	SDF	Gnawo Chopel Lepcha	BJP	Ugen Nedup Bhutia
Mangan	30	Djongu (BL)	SKM	Pintso Namgyal Lepcha	SDF	Sonam Gyatso Lepcha	BJP	Penzong Lepcha
Mangan	31	Lachen–Mangan (BL)	SKM	Samdup Lepcha	SDF	Hishey Lachungpa	None	
	32	Sangha (BM)	SKM	Sonam Lama	SDF	Tshering Lama	BJP	Tseten Tashi Bhutia

== Results ==
=== Results by party ===
Party	Popular vote			Seats		
Party	Votes	%	Change (pp)	Contested	Won	Change
Sikkim Krantikari Morcha	2,25,068	58.38	▲11.21	32	31	▲14
Sikkim Democratic Front	1,05,503	27.37	▼20.26	32	1	▼14
Citizen Action Party – Sikkim	23,261	6.03	New	30	0	Steady
Bharatiya Janata Party	19,956	5.18	▲3.56	31	0	Steady
Indian National Congress	1,228	0.32	▼0.45	12	0	Steady
Independent politician	6,678	1.73		9	0	Steady
NOTA	3,813	0.99	▲0.13			
Total	3,85,072	100%	-	146	32	-

=== Results by districts ===
Source
District	Seats		
District	Seats	SKM	SDF
Gyalshing	4	4	—N/a
Soreng	4	4	—N/a
Namchi	8	8	—N/a
Gangtok	7	6	1
Pakyong	5	5	—N/a
Mangan	3	3	—N/a
Sangha	1	1	—N/a
Total	32	31	1

=== Results by constituency ===
Results by constituency
District	Constituency		Winner				Runner-up				Margin
District	No.	Name	Candidate	Party	Votes	%	Candidate	Party	Votes	%	Margin
Gyalshing	1	Yoksam–Tashiding (BL)	Tshering Thendup Bhutia	SKM	8,271	60.8	Meewang Gyatso Bhutia	SDF	3,459	25.43	4,812
Gyalshing	2	Yangthang	Bhim Hang Limboo	SKM	6,621	54.61	Kesham Limboo	SDF	4,065	33.53	2,556
Gyalshing	3	Maneybong–Dentam	Sudesh Kumar Subba	SKM	8,553	61.16	Tika Ram Chettri	SDF	2,514	17.68	6,039
Gyalshing	4	Gyalshing–Barnyak	Lok Nath Sharma	SKM	5,612	48.1	Khusandra Prasad Sharma	IND	4,649	39.85	963
Soreng	5	Rinchenpong (BL)	Erung Tenzing Lepcha	SKM	9,624	68.91	Norden Bhutia	SDF	3,224	23.08	6,400
Soreng	6	Daramdin (BL)	Mingma Narbu Sherpa	SKM	9,404	67.75	Pem Norbu Sherpa	SDF	3,429	24.7	5,975
Soreng	7	Soreng–Chakung	Prem Singh Tamang	SKM	10,480	71.18	Akar Dhoj Limbu	SDF	3,084	21.24	7,396
Soreng	8	Salghari–Zoom (SC)	Madan Cintury	SKM	5,678	58.69	Janga Bir Darnal	SDF	2,966	30.66	2,712
Namchi	9	Barfung (BL)	Rikshal Dorjee Bhutia	SKM	8,358	61.86	Bhaichung Bhutia	SDF	4,012	23.69	4,346
Namchi	10	Poklok–Kamrang	Bhoj Raj Rai	SKM	8,037	54.99	Pawan Kumar Chamling	SDF	4,974	34.03	3,063
Namchi	11	Namchi–Singhithang	Krishna Kumari Rai	SKM	7,907	71.60	Bimal Rai	SDF	2,605	23.59	5,302
Namchi	12	Melli	Nar Bahadur Pradhan	SKM	7,904	57.96	Ganesh Kumar Rai	CAP	3,621	26.55	4,283
Namchi	13	Namthang–Rateypani	Sanjeet Kharel	SKM	8,949	63.46	Suman Pradhan	SDF	3,344	23.71	5,605
Namchi	14	Temi–Namphing	Bedu Singh Panth	SKM	6,759	51.84	Suman Kumar Tewari	SDF	3,201	24.55	3,558
Namchi	15	Rangang–Yangang	Raj Kumari Thapa	SKM	6,514	50.74	Mani Kumar Subba	SDF	5,313	41.38	1,201
Namchi	16	Tumin–Lingee (BL)	Samdup Tshering Bhutia	SKM	8,265	58.07	Norzong Lepcha	SDF	4,177	29.35	4,088
Gangtok	17	Khamdong–Singtam	Nar Bahadur Dahal	SKM	5,882	52.87	Mani Kumar Sharma	SDF	4,143	37.24	1,739
Pakyong	18	West Pendam (SC)	Lall Bahadur Das	SKM	6,237	48.28	Anup Thatal	SDF	4,285	33.17	1,952
Pakyong	19	Rhenock	Prem Singh Tamang	SKM	10,094	64.54	Somnath Poudyal	SDF	3,050	19.5	7,044
Pakyong	20	Chujachen	Puran Kumar Gurung	SKM	8,199	55.66	Mani Kumar Gurung	SDF	4,865	33.03	3,334
Pakyong	21	Gnathang–Machong (BL)	Pamin Lepcha	SKM	6,676	61.58	Tshering Wangdi Lepcha	SDF	2,869	26.46	3,807
Pakyong	22	Namchaybong	Raju Basnet	SKM	7,195	53.42	Pawan Kumar Chamling	SDF	4,939	36.67	2,256
Gangtok	23	Shyari	Tenzing Norbu Lamtha	SDF	6,633	51.84	Kunga Nima Lepcha	SKM	5,319	41.57	1,314
Gangtok	24	Martam–Rumtek (BL)	Sonam Venchungpa	SKM	8,070	54.01	Mechung Bhutia	SDF	5,308	35.53	2,762
Gangtok	25	Upper Tadong	Gay Tshering Dhungel	SKM	6,209	68.46	Chandra Bahadur Chettri	SDF	2,120	23.38	4,089
Gangtok	26	Arithang	Arun Kumar Upreti	SKM	5,356	61.48	Ashis Rai	SDF	2,627	30.15	2,729
Gangtok	27	Gangtok	Delay Namgyal Barfungpa	SKM	4,440	57.44	Pintso Chopel Lepcha	SDF	1,748	22.61	2,692
Gangtok	28	Upper Burtuk	Kala Rai	SKM	6,323	50.54	Dilli Ram Thapa	BJP	3,755	30.01	4,089
Mangan	29	Kabi–Lungchok (BL)	Thenlay Tshering Bhutia	SKM	5,882	54.18	Gnawo Chopel Lepcha	SDF	4,189	38.59	1,693
Mangan	30	Djongu (BL)	Pintso Namgyal Lepcha	SKM	6,402	69.56	Sonam Gyatso Lepcha	SDF	1,395	15.16	5,007
Mangan	31	Lachen–Mangan (BL)	Samdup Lepcha	SKM	3,929	55.37	Hishey Lachungpa	SDF	3,078	43.38	851
	32	Sangha (BM)	Sonam Lama	SKM	1,919	60.01	Tseten Tashi Bhutia	BJP	1,054	32.96	865

== See also ==
- Elections in Sikkim
- 2024 elections in India
- 2024 Indian general election in Sikkim
