= Dil Kumari Bhandari =

Indian politician (born 1949)

Member of Parliament, Lok Sabha
- In office 20 June 1991 – 10 May 1996
- Preceded by: Nandu Thapa
- Succeeded by: Bhim Prasad Dahal
- Constituency: Sikkim
- In office May 1985 – 27 November 1989
- Preceded by: Vacant
- Succeeded by: Nandu Thapa
- Constituency: Sikkim

Personal details
- Born: Dil Kumari Rai; 14 May 1949 (age 76) Bana Puttabong, Darjeeling district, West Bengal, India
- Party: Sikkim Sangram Parishad
- Spouse: Nar Bahadur Bhandari

Dil Kumari Bhandari (née Rai; born 14 May 1949) is an Indian politician and the first woman member of parliament (Lok Sabha) from Sikkim. She was also the president of Bharatiya Gorkha Parisangh, an organisation of the Indian Gorkhas till 2012. She has been constantly working for the cause of Nepali-speaking people, her most notable contribution being the inclusion of the Nepali language in the Eight Schedule of the Indian constitution.

== Early life and education ==
Dil Kumari Bhandari was born on 14 May 1949 in the village of Bana Puttabong in Darjeeling district, West Bengal, India to N.B. Rai. She comes from a highly cultured and traditional Rai family. She studied up to pre- university level. Dil Kumari was elected as a Member of Parliament from Sikkim twice from May 1985 to 27 November 1989 and from 20 June 1991 to 10 May 1996.

== Career ==
She worked as a teacher, social worker and journalist.

== Political career ==
In 8th Lok Sabha elections of Sikkim in 1984, Nar Bahadur Bhandari swept the polls by securing 56, 614 seats out of 86, 024 seats. Dil Kumari Bhandari lost in this Assembly election. But Nar Bahadur Bhandari had to quit his seat in parliament, as he was elected to the State Assembly to become the chief minister of the state. As a result, a by- election was ordered in April 1985 wherein nine candidates including Dil Kumari Bhandari filed their nominations. But at the eleventh hour, everyone except Dil Kumari Bhandari, withdrew their nominations. As a result, she was declared elected unopposed and she served the Assembly till 27, November 1989.

In the 9th Lok Sabha election from Sikkim in year 1989, Dil Kumari Bhandari (Indian National Congress) winning only 28, 822 out of 1, 33, 699 seats while the winner, Nandu Thapa (Sikkim Sangram Parishad) won 91, 608 seats.

In the 10th Lok Sabha election from Sikkim in year 1991, Dil Kumari Bhandari, who had returned to Sikkim Sangram Parishad, won the election by securing 1, 03, 970 votes from a total of 1,18, 502 valid votes, serving the assembly up to 20 June 1991.

== Electoral record ==
Sikkim Legislative Assembly election

Year	Constituency	Political Party	Result	Position	Votes	% Votes	% Margin	Deposit	Source
1985	Gangtok	SSP	Lost	2nd/12	1749	37.56	5.61	refunded	
1994	Jorthang–Nayabazar	SSP	Lost	2nd/5	2519	35.73	23.27	refunded	
1999	Temi–Tarku	SSP	Lost	2nd/3	3071	41.01	17.69	refunded	
2009	Melli	INC	Lost	2nd/8	2454	26.25	41.22	refunded	

Lok Sabha election, Sikkim

Year	Constituency	Political Party	Result	Position	Votes	% Votes	% Margin	Deposit	Source
1985 (by-election)	Sikkim	SSP	Won	Elected unopposed				refunded	
1989	Sikkim	INC	Lost	2nd/4	28,822	21.56		refunded	
1991	Sikkim	SSP	Won	1st/7	10,3970	90.12		refunded	

== Personal life ==
She married Nar Bahadur Bhandari, who later became the chief minister of Sikkim, on 28 March 1968. She is the mother of a son and three daughters.

== Awards and recognition ==
The Sikkim Sewa Ratna for 2016, the second highest civilian award of the state, was conferred upon Dil Kumari Bhandari for her contribution in the inclusion of Nepali language in the Eight Schedule of the Indian constitution.

She is also a recipient of Gaurav Award, from the Hamro Swabhiman.
