= Daramdin Assembly constituency =

Constituency of the Sikkim legislative assembly in India

Coordinates: 27.138°N 88.168°E

Daramdin
- Constituency No. 6 for the Sikkim Legislative Assembly

Constituency details
- Country: India
- Region: Northeast India
- State: Sikkim
- District: Daramdin
- Lok Sabha constituency: Sikkim
- Established: 1979
- Total electors: 15,269
- Reservation: BL

Member of Legislative Assembly
- 11th Sikkim Legislative Assembly
- Incumbent Mingma Narbu Sherpa
- Party: SKM
- Alliance: NDA
- Elected year: 2024

Daramdin Assembly constituency is one of the 32 assembly constituencies of Sikkim a north east state of India. Daramdin is part of Sikkim Lok Sabha constituency.

== Members of the Legislative Assembly ==
Election	Member	Party
1979	Padam Bahadur Gurung	Sikkim Janata Parishad
1985	Padam Bahadur Gurung	Sikkim Sangram Parishad
1989	Padam Bahadur Gurung	Sikkim Sangram Parishad
1994	Ran Bahadur Subba	Sikkim Democratic Front
1999	Ran Bahadur Subba	Sikkim Democratic Front
2004	Ran Bahadur Subba	Sikkim Democratic Front
2009	Tenzi Sherpa	Sikkim Democratic Front
2014	Danorbu Sherpa	Sikkim Democratic Front
2019	Mingma Narbu Sherpa	Sikkim Krantikari Morcha
2024	Mingma Narbu Sherpa	Sikkim Krantikari Morcha

== Election results ==
=== Assembly Election 2024 ===
2024 Sikkim Legislative Assembly election: Daramdin
Party	Candidate	Votes	%	±%
SKM	Mingma Narbu Sherpa	9,404	67.75%	▲18.68
SDF	Pem Norbu Sherpa	3,429	24.70%	▼21.72
CAP–Sikkim	Pem Dorjee Sherpa	472	3.40%	New
BJP	Phurba Dorjee Sherpa	351	2.53%	▲0.03
NOTA	None of the Above	224	1.61%	▲1.00
Margin of victory		5,975	43.05%	▲40.40
Turnout		13,880	84.61%	▲1.62
Registered electors		16,404		▲7.43
SKM hold		Swing	▲18.68	

=== Assembly election 2019 ===
2019 Sikkim Legislative Assembly election: Daramdin
Party	Candidate	Votes	%	±%
SKM	Mingma Narbu Sherpa	6,219	49.08%	▲8.28
SDF	Pem Norbu Sherpa	5,883	46.43%	▼8.46
BJP	Rozer Tasho Lepcha	317	2.50%	New
INC	Passang Gyalchen Sherpa	102	0.80%	▼1.88
NOTA	None of the Above	78	0.62%	▼1.01
Margin of victory		336	2.65%	▼11.43
Turnout		12,672	82.99%	▼1.66
Registered electors		15,269		▲13.51
SKM gain from SDF		Swing	▼5.81	

=== Assembly election 2014 ===
2014 Sikkim Legislative Assembly election: Daramdin
Party	Candidate	Votes	%	±%
SDF	Danorbu Sherpa	6,250	54.89%	▼14.08
SKM	Mingma Narbu Sherpa	4,646	40.80%	New
INC	Laden Lepcha	306	2.69%	▼16.46
NOTA	None of the Above	185	1.62%	New
Margin of victory		1,604	14.09%	▼35.73
Turnout		11,387	84.65%	▼0.18
Registered electors		13,452		▲20.95
SDF hold		Swing	▼14.08	

=== Assembly election 2009 ===
2009 Sikkim Legislative Assembly election: Daramdin
Party	Candidate	Votes	%	±%
SDF	Tenzi Sherpa	6,507	68.97%	▼18.17
INC	Pem Nuri Sherpa	1,807	19.15%	▲7.97
SHRP	Laden Lepcha	834	8.84%	New
Sikkim Gorkha Party	Sonam Sherpa	173	1.83%	New
NCP	Steny Lepcha	114	1.21%	New
Margin of victory		4,700	49.81%	▼26.13
Turnout		9,435	84.83%	▲5.66
Registered electors		11,122		
SDF hold		Swing	▼18.17	

=== Assembly election 2004 ===
2004 Sikkim Legislative Assembly election: Daramdin
Party	Candidate	Votes	%	±%
SDF	Ran Bahadur Subba	6,380	87.13%	▲25.25
INC	Amar Subba	819	11.19%	▲10.43
Independent	Pushker Limbu	123	1.68%	New
Margin of victory		5,561	75.95%	▲51.43
Turnout		7,322	79.17%	▼2.79
Registered electors		9,248		
SDF hold		Swing		

=== Assembly election 1999 ===
1999 Sikkim Legislative Assembly election: Daramdin
Party	Candidate	Votes	%	±%
SDF	Ran Bahadur Subba	4,194	61.89%	▼0.41
SSP	Akar Dhoj Subba	2,532	37.36%	▲4.49
INC	Pushker Limbu	51	0.75%	▼1.26
Margin of victory		1,662	24.52%	▼4.90
Turnout		6,777	83.19%	▼0.62
Registered electors		8,268		▲11.01
SDF hold		Swing		

=== Assembly election 1994 ===
1994 Sikkim Legislative Assembly election: Daramdin
Party	Candidate	Votes	%	±%
SDF	Ran Bahadur Subba	3,832	62.30%	New
SSP	Padam Bahadur Gurung	2,022	32.87%	▼45.07
Independent	Sunita Pradhan	167	2.72%	New
INC	Satish Mohan Pradhan	124	2.02%	▼17.90
Margin of victory		1,810	29.43%	▼28.60
Turnout		6,151	84.29%	▲14.27
Registered electors		7,448		▲5.90
SDF gain from SSP		Swing	▼15.64	

=== Assembly election 1989 ===
1989 Sikkim Legislative Assembly election: Daramdin
Party	Candidate	Votes	%	±%
SSP	Padam Bahadur Gurung	3,745	77.94%	▲14.23
INC	Ram Bahadur Limbu	957	19.92%	▼11.50
Independent	Passang Sherpa	75	1.56%	New
RIS	Bom Prasad Subba	28	0.58%	New
Margin of victory		2,788	58.02%	▲25.74
Turnout		4,805	70.60%	▲2.58
Registered electors		7,033		▲38.23
SSP hold		Swing	▲14.23	

=== Assembly election 1985 ===
1985 Sikkim Legislative Assembly election: Daramdin
Party	Candidate	Votes	%	±%
SSP	Padam Bahadur Gurung	2,131	63.71%	New
INC	Ram Bahadur Subba	1,051	31.42%	New
Independent	Birkha Singh Subba	124	3.71%	New
Independent	Ratan Bahadur Rai	30	0.90%	New
Margin of victory		1,080	32.29%	▼23.56
Turnout		3,345	67.26%	▼3.85
Registered electors		5,088		▲36.66
SSP gain from SJP		Swing	▼4.61	

=== Assembly election 1979 ===
1979 Sikkim Legislative Assembly election: Daramdin
Party	Candidate	Votes	%	±%
SJP	Padam Bahadur Gurung	1,770	68.31%	New
JP	Phurba Sangey Sherpa	323	12.47%	New
SC (R)	Ram Chandra Sharma	241	9.30%	New
Independent	Purna Bahadur Subba	226	8.72%	New
SPC	Dirga Bahadur Subba	31	1.20%	New
Margin of victory		1,447	55.85%	
Turnout		2,591	72.82%	
Registered electors		3,723		
SJP win (new seat)				

== See also ==
- Daramdin
- West Sikkim district
- List of constituencies of Sikkim Legislative Assembly
