= Sikkim Gorkha Jagaran Sangh =

- Abbreviation: SGJS
- Formation: 2015
- Type: Social organization
- Headquarters: Namchi, Sikkim
- Location: India
- Region served: Sikkim
- Members: Both institutional and individual memberships
- Official language: Nepali
- President: K.B. Rai

Sikkim Gorkha Jagaran Sangh (Nepali: सिक्किम गोर्खा जागरण संघ; translation: Sikkim Gorkha Awakening Association) is a non-government state-level organization of Gorkha ethnic group of Sikkim.

Sikkim Gorkha Jagaran Sangh was established in 2015. It has its headquarters at Namchi, in the South district of Sikkim and unit offices in almost all the regions of Sikkim. Its Working President is K.B. Rai and its Secretary General is B.B. Tamang.

== Vision ==
The Sikkim Gorkha Jagaran Sangh is committed to the vision of a Sikkimese Gorkha society in Sikkim, recognized and accepted as a dignified, cultured and patriotic society at par with any other civilized modern Indian society enjoying the full rights and privileges enshrined in the Indian Constitution.

== Mission ==
The Sikkim Gorkha Jagaran Sangh is committed to the task of bonding each and every member of the Gorkha community in Sikkim, unified body through systematic planning and orientation, thereby strengthening and guiding them in all aspects of their social, cultural, educational, economic and political growth.

== Demands ==
Sikkim Gorkha Jagaran Sangh has identified following issues of the Sikkimese Indian Gorkhas to be resolved at the state level and the national level:

1. Proportionate seat reservation in the State assembly based on population. Amendment of Representation of the People's Act RPA 1980.
2. Amendment of Revenue Order No. 1, an old law so that land can be purchased and sold among Gorkha, Bhutia & Lepcha who are SSC & CoI holders.
3. The geographical history of the Gorkhas predating 1642, linked with the true identity of the Gorkhas, which evidences the Gorkhas as original inhabitants of Sikkim to be taught in Schools, Colleges and Universities by introducing regular curriculum.
4. Restoring the original names of natural places having names in Gorkha/Nepali language like Kanchenjunga, Bhaley Dhunga etc. which have been renamed to Bhutia Language through Gazette Notification in 2001.

== Membership ==
The Sikkim Gorkha Jagaran Sangh has both institutional and individual memberships. Many cultural, literary and social organizations are associated with it. The Sangh also has individuals in its rolls, including eminent political leaders, litterateurs, cultural personalities, academics and professionals. Its main membership - and its strength - however, remains the mass of common people who aspire to be active players in the progress of India.
