= Bhim Prasad Dahal =

Indian politician (1954–2022)

Member of Lok Sabha
- In office 10 May 1996 – 16 May 2004
- Preceded by: Dil Kumari Bhandari
- Succeeded by: Nakul Das Rai
- Constituency: Sikkim

Personal details
- Born: Bhim Prasad Dahal; 2 November 1954 Timburbong, Kingdom of Sikkim
- Died: 6 March 2022 (aged 67) Gangtok, Sikkim, India
- Party: Sikkim Democratic Front
- Education: Government College, Darjeeling, North Bengal University
- Occupation: Agriculturist, Journalist

Bhim Prasad Dahal (29 November 1954 – 6 March 2022) was an Indian politician and writer who was a leader of Sikkim Democratic Front. Dahal served as member of the Lok Sabha representing Sikkim. He was elected to the 11th, 12th and 13th Lok Sabha.

== Personal life ==
Dahal was born in Timburbong, West Sikkim district. He entered government service as a district information officer, and later became an undersecretary to the state government. He was also an author, receiving the Sahitya Akademi Award to Nepali Writers for his novel Droha (2006).

Dahal died at Sir Thutob Namgyal Memorial Hospital in Gangtok from renal failure on 6 March 2022, at the age of 67.
