= Darap =

Village in West Sikkim district, Sikkim, India

- Village
- Location in Sikkim, India Darap (India)
- Coordinates: 27.3063°N 88.1862°E
- Country: India
- State: Sikkim
- District: Gyalshing

Area
  - Total: 565.1 ha (1,396 acres)
- Elevation: 1,800 m (5,900 ft)

Population (2011)
  - Total: 1,743
  - Density: 308.4/km^{2} (798.9/sq mi)

Languages
  - Official: Nepali, Bhutia, Lepcha, Limbu, Newari, Rai, Gurung, Mangar, Sherpa, Tamang and Sunwar
- Time zone: UTC+5:30 (IST)
- PIN: 737113
- Telephone code: 03595
- Vehicle registration: SK-02

Darap is a census village in Gyalshing district, Sikkim, India. As per the 2011 Census of India, Darap village has a total population of 1,743 people including 901 males and 842 females.

Darap village is 8 km away from Pelling town and is a tourist place.
