= Yangthang Assembly constituency =

Constituency of the Sikkim legislative assembly in India

Coordinates: 27.284°N 88.239°E

Yangthang
- Constituency No. 2 for the Sikkim Legislative Assembly

Constituency details
- Country: India
- Region: Northeast India
- State: Sikkim
- District: Gyalshing
- Lok Sabha constituency: Sikkim
- Established: 2008
- Total electors: 12,952
- Reservation: None

Member of Legislative Assembly
- 11th Sikkim Legislative Assembly
- Incumbent Bhim Hang Limboo
- Party: SKM
- Alliance: NDA
- Elected year: 2024

Yangthang Assembly constituency is one of the 32 assembly constituencies of Sikkim a north east state of India. Yangthang is part of Sikkim Lok Sabha constituency.

== Members of the Legislative Assembly ==
Election	Member	Party
2009	Prem Lall Subba	Sikkim Democratic Front
2014	Chandra Maya Limboo (Subba)	Sikkim Democratic Front
2019	Bhim Hang Limboo	Sikkim Krantikari Morcha
2024	Bhim Hang Limboo	Sikkim Krantikari Morcha

== Election results ==
=== Assembly Election 2024 ===
2024 Sikkim Legislative Assembly election: Yangthang
Party	Candidate	Votes	%	±%
SKM	Bhim Hang Limboo	6,621	54.61%	▲6.14
SDF	Kesham Limboo	4,065	33.53%	▼14.50
CAP–Sikkim	Phip Dhoj Limboo	551	4.54%	New
Independent	Pravin Sharma	536	4.42%	New
BJP	Sancha Man Limboo	185	1.53%	New
NOTA	None of the Above	85	0.70%	▲0.01
INC	Mangal Subba (Limboo)	81	0.67%	▼0.20
Margin of victory		2,556	21.08%	▲20.64
Turnout		12,124	85.86%	▲3.28
Registered electors		14,121		▲9.03
SKM hold		Swing	▲6.14	

=== Assembly election 2019 ===
2019 Sikkim Legislative Assembly election: Yangthang
Party	Candidate	Votes	%	±%
SKM	Bhim Hang Limboo	5,184	48.47%	▲10.08
SDF	Dal Bdr. Subba	5,137	48.03%	▼7.97
HSP	Dhan Singh Limboo	115	1.08%	New
SRP	Binay Limboo (Tsong)	93	0.87%	New
INC	Mangal Subba (Limboo)	93	0.87%	▼1.53
NOTA	None of the Above	74	0.69%	▼1.02
Margin of victory		47	0.44%	▼17.17
Turnout		10,696	82.58%	▼1.89
Registered electors		12,952		▲17.59
SKM gain from SDF		Swing	▼7.54	

=== Assembly election 2014 ===
2014 Sikkim Legislative Assembly election: Yangthang
Party	Candidate	Votes	%	±%
SDF	Chandra Maya Limboo (Subba)	5,211	56.00%	▼17.18
SKM	Kharka Bdr. Subba	3,572	38.39%	New
INC	Lall Man Subba	223	2.40%	▼17.20
NOTA	None of the Above	159	1.71%	New
BJP	Ashis Gurung	140	1.50%	▼1.26
Margin of victory		1,639	17.61%	▼35.98
Turnout		9,305	84.48%	▼1.51
Registered electors		11,015		▲20.13
SDF hold		Swing	▼17.18	

=== Assembly election 2009 ===
2009 Sikkim Legislative Assembly election: Yangthang
Party	Candidate	Votes	%	±%
SDF	Prem Lall Subba	5,770	73.19%	New
INC	Depan Hang Limbu	1,545	19.60%	New
BJP	Padam Bahadur Chettri	218	2.77%	New
SHRP	Akar Dhoj Limbu	148	1.88%	New
Sikkim Jan-Ekta Party	Karna Bahadur Gurung	143	1.81%	New
Sikkim Gorkha Party	Ganesh Bhattarai	60	0.76%	New
Margin of victory		4,225	53.59%	
Turnout		7,884	85.99%	
Registered electors		9,169		
SDF win (new seat)				

== See also ==
- Gyalshing district
- List of constituencies of Sikkim Legislative Assembly
