= Sonam Venchungpa =

Indian politician

MLA Sonam Venchungpa

Member of Legislative Assembly for Martam-Rumtek
- Incumbent
- Assumed office 2019 by-elections

Personal details
- Party: Sikkim Krantikari Morcha (2024-present)
- Other political affiliations: Bharatiya Janata Party (2019-2024)

Sonam Tshering Venchungpa is an Indian politician. He was elected to the Sikkim Legislative Assembly from Martam-Rumtek in the 2019 by election as a member of the Bharatiya Janata Party. He was re-elected in 2024 as SKM candidate.
