= Sikkim Republican Party =

Indian political party

- Abbreviation: SRP
- Leader: Kharka Bahadur Rai
- Founder: Kharka Bahadur Rai
- Founded: February 2017 (8 years ago)
- Headquarters: Rangpo, Sikkim, India.
- Ideology: Republicanism
- Colours: Blue , White , Red and Yellow
- ECI Status: Registered-Unrecognized State Party (Sikkim)
- Seats in Sikkim Legislative Assembly: 0 / 32

Sikkim Republican Party (SRP) is a regional political party (State Party (Unrecognized)) in the Indian state of Sikkim. Founder and incumbent president is Kharka Bahadur Rai (K.B. Rai). Election symbol is Flute.

== History ==
On February 27, 2017, K.B. Rai launched a new political party, Sikkim Republican Party (SRP) at Jorethang, South Sikkim. K.B. Rai is former President of Sikkim Gorkha Jagaran Sangh which advocates the expansion of the interests for Gorkha ethnic group of Sikkim.

On February 22, 2019, SRP was allotted the flute as party's symbol by ECI for the 2019 Sikkim Legislative Assembly Election (32 constituencies). In April same year, SRP nominated 12 candidates from 13 constituencies for this election. But all candidates lost and only received 1.51% votes or less in each constituency. In Lok Sabha Election 2019 in Sikkim, SRP nominated Dhiraj Kumar Rai as its candidate, but he lost and secured only 1,503 votes (0.43%) and the 7th position of 11 candidates.

In the September same year By-Election for Sikkim Legislative Assembly (3 constituencies), SRP send candidates to all 3 constituencies. But all candidates lost and only received 1.94% votes or less in each constituency.

In 2024 Sikkim Assembly elections, the party only received 0.04% of the total votes.

== Electoral records ==
Sikkim Legislative Assembly election

Year	Total Seats	Seats Contested	Seats Won	Forfeited Deposits	% Votes Contested	Source
2019	32	13	0	13	0.80	
2019 (by-election)	3	3	0	3		

Lok Sabha election, Sikkim

Year	State	Total Seats	Seats Contested	Seats Won	Forfeited Deposits	% Votes Contested	Source
2019	Sikkim	1	1	0	1	0.43	
2024	Sikkim	1	1	0	1	1.25	
