= Prem Das Rai =

Indian politician

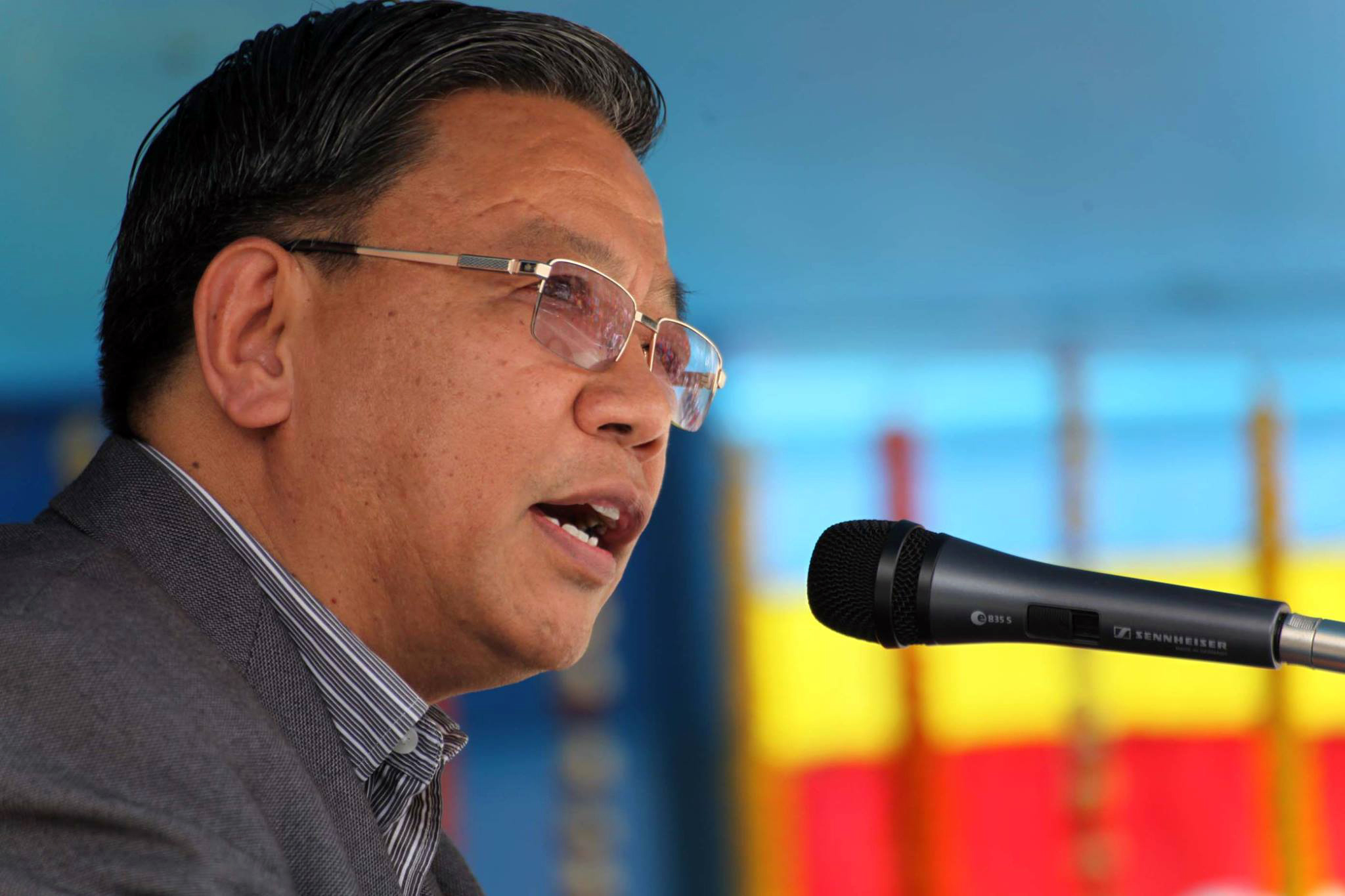

Member of Parliament Sikkim
- In office 16 May 2009 – 23 May 2019
- Preceded by: Nakul Das Rai
- Succeeded by: Indra Hang Subba

Spokesperson Sikkim Democratic Front

Personal details
- Born: 31 July 1954 (age 72) Darjeeling, West Bengal, India
- Party: Sikkim Democratic Front
- Spouse: Jean Rai
- Children: 2
- Parent: Chandra Das Rai (father)
- Education: Wynberg Allen School; IIT Kanpur; IIM Ahmedabad

Prem Das Rai (born 31 July 1954) is an Indian politician from the Sikkim Democratic Front (SDF) party. Rai was a Member of Parliament (Lok Sabha) from the Sikkim constituency of Sikkim, India, first elected in 2009 election and re-elected in 2014 after serving his first term in 2009–2014. In 2019 Lok Sabha election he did not get the ticket from SDF.

He has the distinction of being the first Member of Parliament with both Indian Institutes of Technology and Indian Institutes of Management degrees. In 2002, he was awarded the prestigious and selective Eisenhower Fellowship (USA) for his contribution to Sikkim's economic and industrial growth.

He is married to Jean Chun Ping Rai. They have two children.

== Early life and education ==
Rai attended Wynberg Allen School, Mussoorie, then in Uttar Pradesh, on a Government of India scholarship. He studied chemical engineering at IIT, Kanpur, in 1976 and obtained his post-graduate diploma in management (MBA) in 1978 from IIM, Ahmedabad.

== Career ==
After starting his career with the Bank of America in Kolkata, he returned in 1979 to serve Sikkim in various capacities such as the Managing Director of Sikkim Flour Mills Limited (1979 – 1985), Managing Director of the Sikkim Milk Union (1983 – 85), Chairman of Sikkim Industrial Development and Investment Corporation Limited (SIDICO) & Sikkim Scheduled Tribes and All Other Backward Classes Financial Development Corporation (SABCCO, 1999 – 2004), Founding Chairman of the Ecotourism and Conservation Society of Sikkim (ECOSS) (2001–2009), and CEO (Northeast India) of BASIX (2008), India's eminent micro-finance and livelihood promotion institution.

During the period 1985 - 2006, Rai was also a prolific entrepreneur. He is credited with bringing the first computers into Sikkim, and set up an email service in the region which was used as a Bulletin Board Service between Gangtok and Kolkata before Internet services were widely available in the region. Along with his father, he edited the popular weekly, the Gangtok Times, for a decade between 1994 and 2004.

His political career began in 1993-94, when he joined the Sikkim Democratic Front (SDF) Party after the Party was founded by his political mentor, Shri Pawan Chamling. Rai joined the SDF in its formative years. He served as the party's General Secretary and has worked at all its various structural levels. He has helped with SDF's manifesto and vision, and continues to work for the party and for the prosperity of the Sikkimese people.

He also served as the Secretary General and later as President of the Akhil Kirat Rai Sangh (AKRS), and Chaired the Other Backwards Classes Association. He also served as the Deputy Chairman of the State Planning Commission of the Government of Sikkim. He is also in the mentor panel of Vision India Foundation a New Delhi based think tank which works on public leadership amongst youth.

As a parliamentarian, he served in various capacities. He was a Member of the Parliamentary Standing Committee on Finance, the Parliamentary Standing Committee on Subordinate Legislation, and the Parliamentary Consultative Committee on Tribal Affairs & DoNER Ministry and led the Parliamentary Committee on Population & Development. During this period, he was also the Secretary General of the North-East MPs’ Forum, Member of the Governing Council of Centre for Environmental Health, Public Health Foundation of India (PHFI) and Integrated Mountain Initiative (IMI), and Member of the Advisory Council of Population Foundation of India (PFI). He was the Chairman of the Library Committee of Parliament in his second term.

Rai also served as chair for the Steering Committee on Anti-Drugs under the Department of Social Justice & Women Empowerment, Government of Sikkim, which has spawned a unique program in Government Schools called SAATHI. He was also the Co-Chair of the Steering Committee of Educational Quality Improvement Program (EQUIP), under the Human Resource Development Department, Government of Sikkim.

Until recently, he also served as the editor of the Political & Economic Journal of Sikkim commenting primarily on Political and Economic issues, and as a SDF Spokesperson.

== Current national and state roles ==
Social platform: Rai currently serves as the President of the Integrated Mountain Initiative (IMI) and writes extensively on Sustainable Mountain Development issues. He also writes about civil society and the issues pertaining to it, some of his articles for Civil Society Magazine can be found here.

Political platform: He serves as the Senior Vice President of the SDF party and is actively engaged in mentoring youth leaders of the party.

== Awards and accolades ==
Rai has undertaken leadership courses at Yale, Oxford, Harvard and Princeton Universities on invitation. He has also lectured in Universities and Institutions in Tokyo, Japan, sponsored by the Sasakawa Foundation, and has attended the United Nations General Assembly and Security Council working sessions on behalf of the Country seconded by the Ministry of External Affairs in 2018. He was awarded the Eisenhower Fellowship in 2000 for distinguished contribution to the economic and industrial growth of Sikkim.

In 2011, he was awarded Distinguished Alumnus of IIM Ahmedabad, and is also a Notable Alumnus of IIT Kanpur.
