= Indra Hang Subba =

Indian politician

Dr. Indra Hang Subba
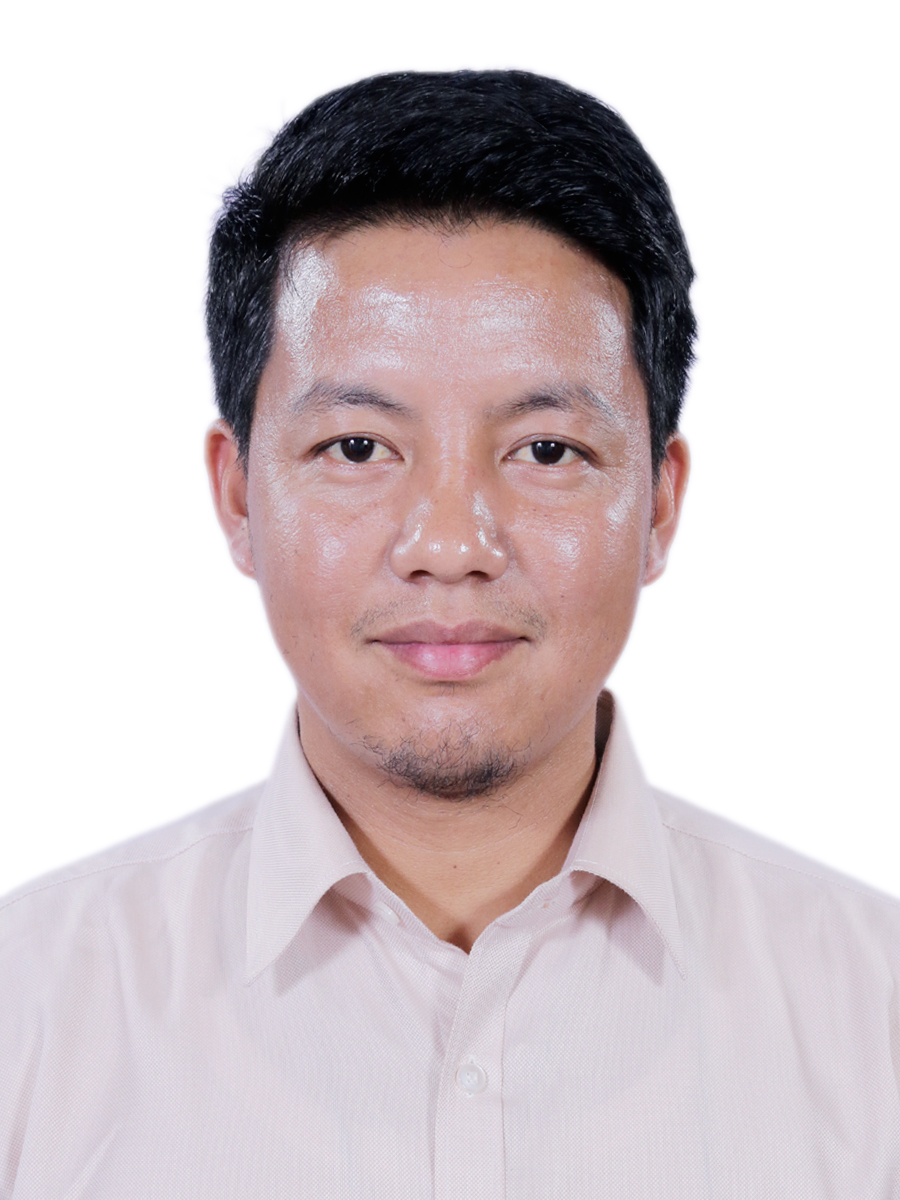

Member of Parliament, Lok Sabha
- Incumbent
- Assumed office 1 June 2019
- Preceded by: Prem Das Rai
- Constituency: Sikkim

Personal details
- Born: 2 February 1989 (age 37) Hee Patal, Hee Gaon, Dentam, West Sikkim, India
- Party: Sikkim Krantikari Morcha
- Education: Sikkim University
- Occupation: Politician

Dr. Indra Hang Subba is an Indian politician from Sikkim Krantikari Morcha (SKM) party. He is a Member of Parliament (Lok Sabha) constituency from the Sikkim India, first elected in 2019 election (17th Lok Sabha) and re-elected in 2024 election (18th Lok Sabha).

== Education ==
He has completed his Doctorate in Physics from Sikkim University.

== Early life ==
He was born in Subba family in West Sikkim within the Maneybong-Dentam constituency. He completed his schooling from the Hee Yangthang Senior secondary school and later studied at Sikkim University.
