= Ganga Prasad =

Indian politician

Ganga Prasad Chaurasia
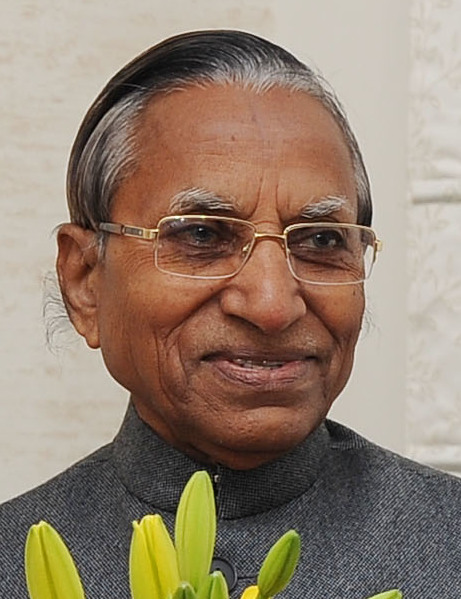

15th Governor of Sikkim
- In office 26 August 2018 – 12 February 2023
- Chief Minister: Pawan Kumar Chamling; Prem Singh Tamang
- Preceded by: Shriniwas Dadasaheb Patil
- Succeeded by: Lakshman Acharya

Governor of Manipur
- (Additional Charge)
- In office 12 August 2021 – 26 August 2021
- Chief Minister: N. Biren Singh
- Preceded by: Najma Heptulla
- Succeeded by: La. Ganesan

17th Governor of Meghalaya
- In office 5 October 2017 – 25 August 2018
- Chief minister: Mukul Sangma; Conrad Sangma
- Preceded by: Banwarilal Purohit
- Succeeded by: Tathagata Roy

Personal details
- Born: 8 July 1939 (age 87) Khajpura, Patna, Bihar, British India
- Party: Bharatiya Janata Party
- Spouse: Kamla Devi
- Children: 5, including Sanjeev Chaurasia
- Education: Patna High School; College of Commerce Patna
- Occupation: Politician

Ganga Prasad Chaurasia is an Indian politician who is former governor of the states of Sikkim and Meghalaya. He was a member of Bihar Legislative Council and was the leader of the opposition during the RJD regime. He also held the post of leader of the Bihar legislative council during the NDA rule in Bihar. He got associated with Jan Sangh and remained associated with the same ideology till date. He is an ardent follower of Arya Samaj and served as Pradhan (Head) of the Bihar Arya Samaj Pratinidhi Sabha unit. He is popularly known as 'Ganga Babu' in the political circle.

== Early life and family ==
Born in a business family his father Late Mundar Sah (Aged 109 yrs) was a successful entrepreneur who coordinated with people from the states of east India and Bangladesh for his business mostly thorough correspondence. Mr. Sah was socially very active. He became the Mukhiya (Chief) of his location (Khajpura) for 2 terms, which is now part of the Patna Municipal Corporation. Sri Mundar Sah realized the importance of politics in the state of Bihar and thus pushed Mr. Prasad towards politics and could match the ideology with that of Jan Sangh.

Mr. Prasad was the chairman of Dadhichi Dehdaan Samiti, Bihar chapter, an organisation for promoting voluntary organ donation.

His eldest son Arun Kumar is a businessman and his 2nd son Sanjeev Chaurasia, is a BJP MLA from Digha constituency in Patna district. His 3rd son Deepak Chaurasia was ward councilor from ward no.2 of Patna Municipal corporation for three terms but later that ward got reserved as women seat, then Deepak's wife Madhu Chaurasia stood and got elected as the councilor after Mr. Prasad's insistence. His Son-in-law Sri Umesh Kumar, IPS (Karnataka cadre), is CID ADGP, Karnataka. His daughter Suruchi Kumari is a businesswoman. And his youngest son is into IT.

== Career ==
Prasad was elected to the Legislative Council of Bihar in 1994 and had been a member for 18 years since then.

On 30 September 2017, Prasad was appointed by President Ram Nath Kovind as the new Governor of Meghalaya.

On 26 August 2018, Prasad was sworn in as the 16th Governor of Sikkim, replacing Shriniwas Dadasaheb Patil.

== Early Political career ==
1966 – Inspired by the ideology of Shri Shyama Pd. Mukherjee & Pt. Dindayal Upadhaya he joined the political party Jan Sangh.

1967 – He unsuccessfully contested assembly election from Danapur constituency in Bihar.

1968 – He became the Maha Mantri of Jan Sangh of Patna district.

1969 – Mr. Prasad again fought the assembly election from Danapur but could not make it to the assembly.

1972 – He was appointed General Secretary of Bihar Pradesh Badhai Mahasabha.

1974 – During the protest because of the inflation before emergency he was arrested, his scooter/vehicles were confiscated.

1975 – He absconded after his arrest warrant during emergency. But after Kurki Japti (confiscation of assets) he had to surrender. He was left on parole due to flood that time. During the emergency 'Arya Bhawan' his house used to be the hub for all the Jan Sangh and RSS leaders as residence/hiding point and meeting point.

1977 – After the emergency was lifted, the first OTC of RSS was held at Sanskrit Vidyapeeth, Patna, all the Sangh's National Padadhikaris (officeholder) stayed at his residence 'Arya Bhawan'. B P Koirala also came to his residence to meet Balasaheb Deoras.

At the same time top dignitaries from Arya Samaj ( Pradhan- Ram Gopal Shalwale), (Mantri- Om Prakash Tyagi) stayed at his residence for the work of Arya Samaj and also coincidentally met Balasaheb.

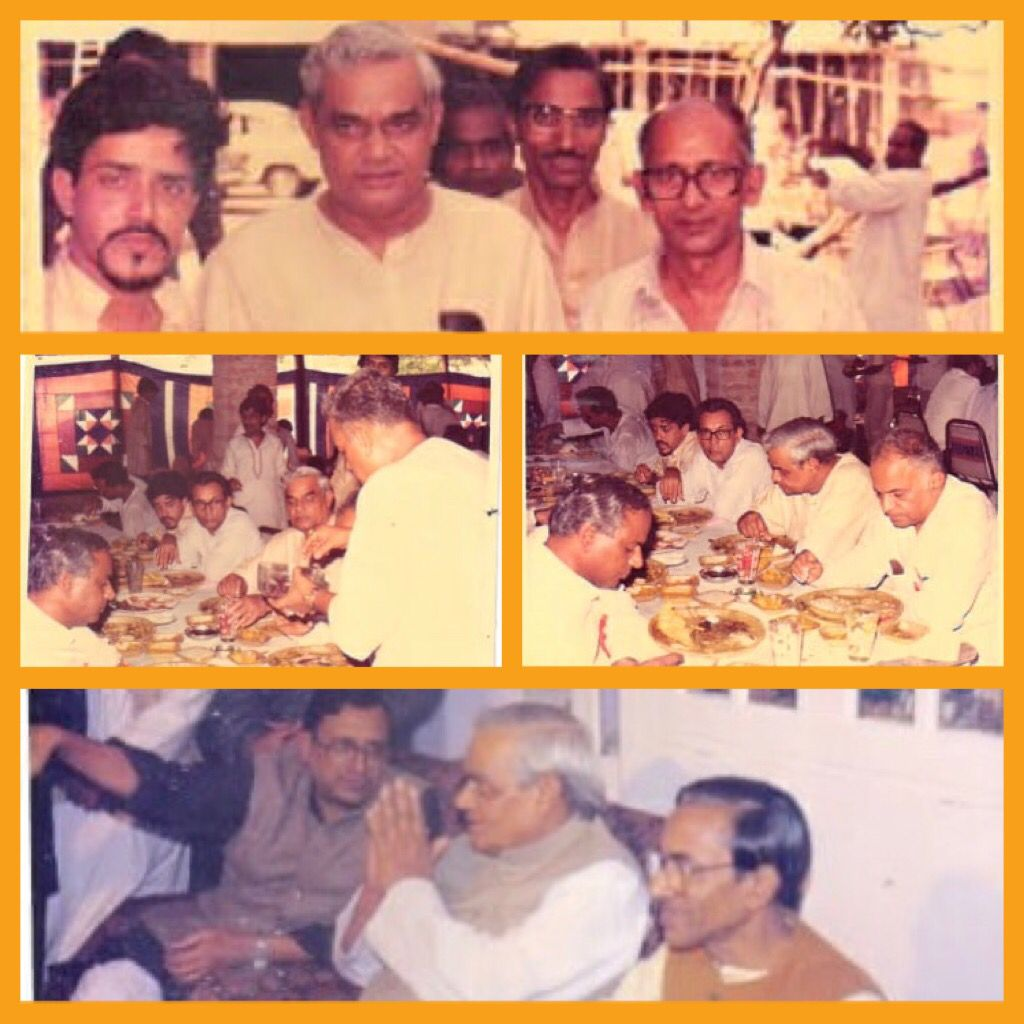
Atal Bihari Vajpayee at Arya Bhawan, Patna

During everyone's stay, his father late Mundar sah used to monitor everyone's hospitality and make sure no one had any problem.

1979 – Bihar Vaishya Parishad organised an event for which Karpoori Thakur inaugurated the ceremony and Mr Prasad was the Swagat Adhyach (Welcoming Chief).

1980 – When BJP was formed he became the Nidhi Pramukh of BJP Bihar chapter. He is considered one of the first few members of BJP in Bihar.

1985 – He again tried his luck from Danapur constituency on BJP ticket but couldn't succeed. During the election campaign many leaders came to Danapur. Prof. Sukhada Pandey gave a speech which was noticed by the central team.

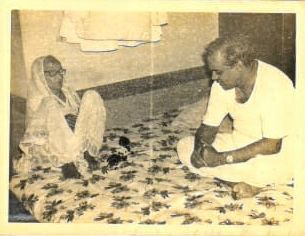
Atal ji with mother of Ganga 'babu' during Jan Sangh event in Patna.

Political offices
Preceded by Banwarilal Purohit	Governor of Meghalaya; 5 October 2017 – 25 August 2018	Succeeded by Tathagata Roy
Preceded by Shriniwas Dadasaheb Patil	Governor of Sikkim; 26 August 2018–12 February 2023	Succeeded by Lakshman Acharya
