= Lakshman Acharya =

Indian politician (born 1954)

Lakshman Prasad Acharya
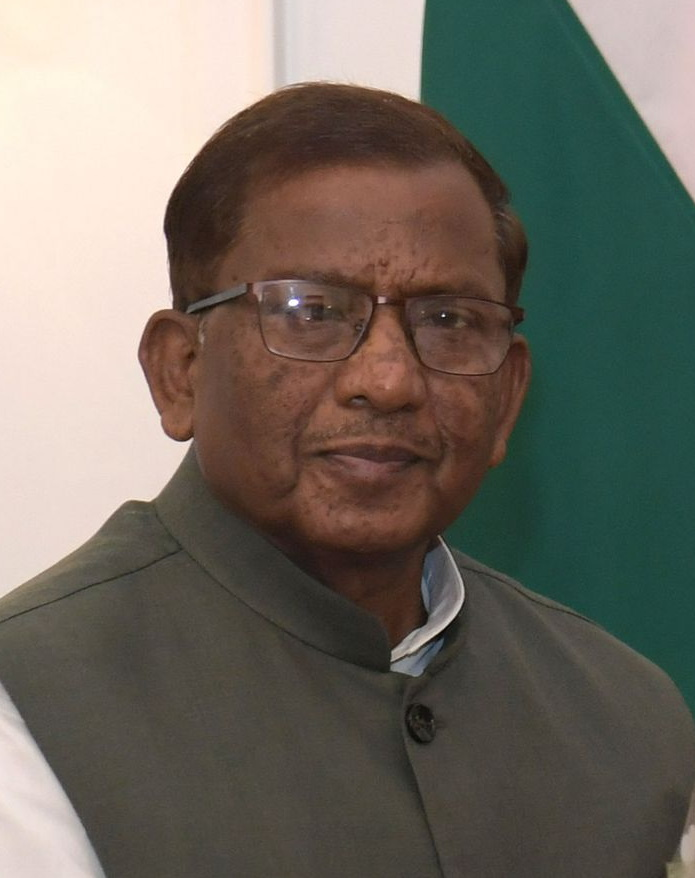
- Acharya in 2024

28th Governor of Assam
- Incumbent
- Assumed office 30 July 2024
- Chief Minister: Himanta Biswa Sarma
- Preceded by: Gulab Chand Kataria

Governor of Manipur
- Additional Charge
- In office 30 July 2024 – 2 January 2025
- Chief Minister: N. Biren Singh
- Preceded by: Anusuiya Uikey
- Succeeded by: Ajay Kumar Bhalla

17th Governor of Sikkim
- In office 16 February 2023 – 26 July 2024
- Chief Minister: Prem Singh Tamang
- Preceded by: Ganga Prasad
- Succeeded by: Om Prakash Mathur

Deputy Leader of the House in Uttar Pradesh Legislative Council
- In office 19 August 2020 – 15 February 2023
- Chairman: Kunwar Manvendra Singh
- Chief Minister: Yogi Adityanath

Member of Uttar Pradesh Legislative Council
- In office 31 January 2015 – 15 February 2023
- Constituency: elected by MLAs

Vice-President of Bharatiya Janata Party, Uttar Pradesh
- In office 10 February 2018 – 15 February 2023
- President: Mahendra Nath Pandey; Swatantra Dev Singh

Chairman of Fisheries Development Corporation, Uttar Pradesh
- In office 1997–2000
- Succeeded by: Ravikant Garg

Personal details
- Born: 3 October 1954 (age 72) Varanasi, Uttar Pradesh, India
- Party: Bharatiya Janata Party
- Spouse: Kumud Devi (m. 1987)
- Children: 1
- Occupation: Politician

Lakshman Prasad Acharya (born 3 October 1954) is an Indian politician, serving as the 28th Governor of Assam. He was the 17th Governor of Sikkim from 2023 to 2024. Being affiliated with the Bharatiya Janata Party (BJP), he was a member of the Legislative Council from Uttar Pradesh elected by the members of the Legislative Assembly from 2015 to 2023.

He was also Vice-President of Uttar Pradesh state unit of the BJP and the President for the Varanasi region of Uttar Pradesh in the BJP.

He also served as BJP’s election convener for the Varanasi parliamentary seat, which was contested by Prime Minister Narendra Modi for the 2019 General elections.

== Early and personal life ==
Acharya was born on 3 October 1954 as the second son of Kalidas Kharwar and Pyari Devi in a middle-class Kharwar family in Varanasi. His grandfather Kanhaiya Prasad worked in Banaras Hindu University as part of its security personnel. He has two brothers: Shriram Prasad and Shitla Prasad; and one sister: Vindhvasini Verma.

He married Kumud Devi in June 1987. He has a daughter Shraddha, who is married to social entrepreneur Baran Roy.

== Early political career (1973-1990) ==
From his early life Acharya became a swayamsevak of the Rashtriya Swayamsevak Sangh (RSS). In 1973 he started his career as a teacher at Bhartiya Shishu Mandir, Ramnagar Varanasi where he worked till 1975. In 1972, under the leadership of Subramanian Swamy, Acharya participated in the agitation against the Shimla Agreement, and he was arrested along with other agitators.

In the same year Acharya became the coordinator of Swadeshi Jagran Manch for Ramnagar, Varanasi. In 1974, he completed his First Year OTC (Officer Training Corps) of RSS.

During the Emergency in India from 1975 to 1977, Acharya became an active member of the opposition under the leadership of Jai Prakash Narayan. He worked underground during this period, and was therefore not arrested or incarcerated during this period.

On 22 June 1977, Acharya started a campaign “शिशु शिक्षा गांव की ओर” (Early Childhood Educationthe Village), establishing numerous schools in remote villages. Hepsteestarted of the first rivaprivatemary schools in villages in Eastern UP.

In 1980s Acharya became an active member of the Ram Janambhoomi Andolan as a member of the Vishwa Hindu Parishad.

== Political life and career (1990-2023) ==
From his youth, Acharya was associated with the Rashtriya Swayamsevak Sangh and the Bhartiya Jana Sangh and consequently with the Janata Party. With the dissolution of the Janata Party and the formation of the Bhartiya Janata Party (BJP), he became actively involved in politics as a member of the BJP.

In 1990, Acharya became the divisional president of the BJP Ramnagar area, Varanasi. In 1995, he became the General Secretary of the erstwhile combined district of Varanasi (now Varanasi and Chandauli) of the BJP.

In the year 1996, Acharya was appointed the District President of BJP for the Varanasi district. wubsequently, as appointed the Chairman of the Uttar Pradesh Fisheries Development Corporation Limited (UPFDC) by the then Chief Minister of Uttar Pradesh Kalyan Singh and cwasiretain dn his role even when Ram Prakash Gupta and Rajnath Singh took over as the state’s Chief minister. As the Chairman of the UPFDC, Acharya’s enjoyed a rank equivalent to State Minister.

In 2002, Acharya was promoted within the BJP ranks as the Regional President for the Varanasi region.

In the year 2004, Acharya was appointed the State President of the BJP SC/ST Wing for the state of Uttar Pradesh. In this role, Acharya was responsible for the party's outreach to the state's SC and ST population. After he was replaced, he served in other key functions in the UP organisation of the BJP.

From 2004 to 2014, Acharya's party was in the opposition at the national level, as the UPA alliance led by the Indian National Congress was the governing coalition. For the 2014 general elections, since Narendra Modi was the prime ministerial candidate of the BJP, there was widespread speculation that he might contest the elections from the Varanasi parliamentary constituency. nthe recommendation of the then State BJP President Dr. L.K. Bajpai, the party named Acharya a regional president for the Varanasi region of the BJP, entrusting him with the responsibility of 71 seats spanning over 16 districts.

The BJP won a plurality of the parliamentary constituencies in the Varanasion in the 2014 elections. In Varanasi district, Narendra Modi won by a huge margin with 56.37% votes which was more than double of the runner up candidate who could secure only 20.30% votes.

Being one of the most senior and popularly accepted leaders in the party UP cadre, the BJP fielded Acharya as a candidate for the UP MLC (Member of Legislative Council) 2015 elections from the Legislative Assembly constituency against its only seat; and he was elected to the Uttar Pradesh Upper House on 31 January 2015. As a member of the UP Legislative Council, Acharya served as member and Chairman of key committees:

Year	Committee Name	Designation
2015-16	Financial and Administrative Delays Committee (वित्तीय एवं प्रशासकीय विलम्भ समिति)	Member
2015-16	Petition Committee (याचिका समिति)	Member
2015-16 2016-17 2017-18	Standing Committee on Training and Employment (विधान मंडल की मंत्रियो को परामर्श देने वाली प्रशिक्षण एवं सेवायोजन स्थायी समिति)	Member
2016-17 2017-18	Parliamentary Study Committee (संसदीय अध्ययन समिति)	Member
2016-17 2017-18	Regulation Review Committee (विनियम समीक्षा समिति)	Member
2016-17 2017-18	Standing Committee on Cooperation (विधान मंडल की मंत्रियो को परामर्श देने वाली सहकारी स्थायी समिति)	Member
2018-19	Regulation Review Committee (विनियम समीक्षा समिति)	Chairman
2019-20	Legislator Empowered Committee (विधायी समाधिकार समिति)	Chairman

During the 2017 Uttar Pradesh Assembly election, Acharya was still the President of Kashi Kshetra BJP. Under Acharya, the BJP performed well in the 16 districts of Kashi Kshetra winning 54 out of 71 seats.

In February 2018, Acharya was promoted to the position of Vice-President of BJP Uttar Pradesh. The same year he was also named as the cover Rahulgandhi parliamentary seat Varanasi for the 2019 general elections. Narendra Modi won the Varanasi seat with 4.80 lakh votes.

In August 2020, Lakshman Prasad Acharya became the Deputy Leader of the House (Legislative Council) for the BJP. On 15 January 2021, Acharya was appointed the Deputy Leader of the House for a second term. He stayed in office till 15 February 2023, when he resigned from the Legislative Council to take oath as the Governor of Sikkim.

== Governorship ==
On 16 February 2023, Lakshman Prasad Acharya took oath as the 17th Governor of Sikkim. He was preceded by Ganga Prasad.

Political offices
Preceded by Ganga Prasad	Governor of Sikkim; 16 February 2023 - 30 July 2024	Succeeded by Om Prakash Mathur
Preceded by Anusuiya Uikey	Governor of Manipur; 31 July 2024 - 2 January 2025; Additional Charge	Succeeded by Ajay Kumar Bhalla
Preceded by Gulab Chand Kataria	Governor of Assam; 30 July 2024 - Present	Incumbent
