= Citizen Action Party – Sikkim =

- Abbreviation: CAP Sikkim
- Leader: Ganesh Kumar Rai
- President: Ganesh K. Rai
- Founder: Ganesh Kumar Rai
- Founded: 26 January 2023
- Ideology: Reformism, Regionalism
- ECI status: State party

Election symbol
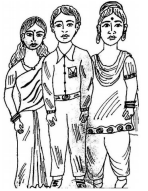

Website
- www.citizenactionparty.com

The Citizen Action Party – Sikkim is a regional political party in the Indian state of Sikkim. The party was formed in January 2023 after the statewide Sikkim Sudhar Sankalpa Yatra (Sikkim Reform Resolution journey) held under banner of reform call. Ganesh K Rai, a former Chairman Sikkim Cooperative Union and Panchayat President Mellidara GPU and supporters of former Sikkim Democratic Front leader Ganesh Kumar Rai led the reform movement after 2019 election. At its founding, Rai claimed that the party would forgo traditional elements of political parties in Sikkim and would have no party flag, political slogan and finance itself without the use of bank loans. The party claims to be a grassroots movement and to be financed through crowdfunding.

The CAP - Sikkim is focussed on a reformist agenda. In its manifesto for the 2024 state election in Sikkim, it promised to eliminate the state debt of Sikkim within 10 years, to stop investing state funds in the Teesta-IV hydel power project and attract investments to the state. In constitutional matters, the CAP - Sikkim supports reserved seats in the state assembly for minorities and the autonomous status of Sikkim within India.

== History ==
The party was formed in January 2023 at Melli. LP Kafley Former Chairman Sikkim Cooperative Union became the first president of the party in 23 May through election held by party's Election Council, while Ganesh Kumar Rai became chief coordinator on the day of party's formation. The party received the electoral symbol of a citizen. Bharat Basnet, a Former SPCC President Indian National Congress politician, became second president of the party in February 2024 after LP Kafley stepped down from his position.

Bharat Basnet was the MP (Lok Sabha) candidate in the 2024 Indian general election, and aligned neither with the ruling National Democratic Alliance nor the main opposition Indian National Developmental Inclusive Alliance. Bharat Basnet came in second behind with 22% vote share the incumbent Indra Hang Subba.

The party participated in 30 seats in the 2024 Sikkim Legislative Assembly election with 3 female and 27 male candidates with Ganesh K Rai as its candidate for Chief Minister of Sikkim. The party came in third and failed to win any seats.

== Election results ==
=== Lok Sabha ===
Election	Party leader	Seats contested	Seats won	Change in Seats	Overall votes %	Vote % in Seats contested	ref
2024	Bharat Basnett	1	0 / 543	Steady	0.01%	21.71%	

=== Sikkim Assembly ===
Election	Party leader	Seats contested	Seats won	Change in Seats	Overall votes %	Vote % in Seats contested	ref
2024	Ganesh Kumar Rai	30	0 / 32	Steady	6.03%		
