= Sikkim Krantikari Morcha =

Indian political party

- Abbreviation: SKM
- Chairperson: Prem Singh Tamang
- Parliamentary Chairperson: Indra Hang Subba
- Lok Sabha Leader: Indra Hang Subba
- Treasurer: Pravin Kr Agarwal
- Founder: Prem Singh Tamang
- Founded: 4 February 2013; 13 years ago
- Split from: Sikkim Democratic Front
- Headquarters: Ghaley Compound, Tibet Road, Gangtok – 737101, Sikkim, India.
- Student wing: Tshering Wangchuk Lepcha
- Youth wing: Lakpa Moktan
- Women's wing: SKM Women's Wing
- Labour wing: Hermon Tenzing Namchyo
- Peasant's wing: SKM Agriculture Wing
- Ideology: Conservatism (India); Sikkimese nationalism Regionalism
- Political position: Syncretic
- Colours: Red
- ECI status: State party
- Alliance: NDA (2019–present); NEDA (2019–present)
- Seats in Rajya Sabha: 0 / 245
- Seats in Lok Sabha: 1 / 543
- Seats in Sikkim Legislative Assembly: 32 / 32
- Number of states and union territories in government: 1 / 32

Election symbol
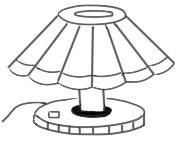
- Lamp

Party flag

Website
- www.sikkimkrantikarimorcha.org

Sikkim Krantikari Morcha (SKM; lit. 'Sikkim Revolutionary Front') is a political party in the Indian state of Sikkim which is the ruling party of Sikkim since 2019.

P.S. Golay, a member of the Sikkim Legislative Assembly, was one of the prominent figures of the Sikkim Democratic Front (SDF) and was a minister in the government of Sikkim. Since December 2009 he has been a vocal critic of Pawan Kumar Chamling, the President of the SDF and the former chief minister of Sikkim. He started the party Sikkim Krantikari Morcha on 4 February 2013. Golay became the Chief Minister of Sikkim on 28 May 2019, thus ending Chamling’s 25-year-rule. In the 2024 general elections the Sikkim Krantikari Morcha party won a landslide victory of 31 seats out of 32; in July 2024 the sole MLA of the opposition Sikkim Democratic Front, Tenzing Norbu Lamtha defected to Sikkim Krantikari Morcha, resulting in the Sikkim Legislative Assembly having no opposition.

== History ==
=== 2014 election ===
On 4 February 2013, SKM was established at Soreng, a western city of Sikkim.

In September 2009, P.S. Golay formally seceded from SDF and became the Party President of SKM.

SKM contested assembly election from all 32 constituencies which were held on 12 April 2014. SKM won 10 seats and became the second largest party and opposition in the Sikkim Legislative Assembly. They secured 40.8% votes in the election. The former Chief Minister of Sikkim Nar Bahadur Bhandari gave his unconditional support to SKM party withdrawing his party Sikkim Sangram Parishad from participation in elections, 2014 and played an active role during campaigning phase of SKM party. Likely Former Chief Minister of Sikkim B. B. Gurung shown his support to SKM party, resigning from ruling SDF party.

For the by-poll of Sikkim Legislative Assembly which were held 13 September 2014, SKM established the alliance with Bharatiya Janata Party (BJP), and supported Bikash Basnet who was a candidate of BJP.

In 2017, SKM elected MLA Kunga Nima Lepcha as Acting President of the party and Similarly M.P. Subba and Navin Karki as Working President. Party also appointed Arun Upreti as Secretary General of the party.

=== 2019 election ===
The party came close to allying with Bhartiya Janata Party before the 2019 Indian Election but decided to fight alone. After the 2019 Sikkim Legislative Assembly election it decided to join the National Democratic Alliance on 26 May 2019 led by the Bharatiya Janata Party.

They contested on all 32 constituencies of the Sikkim Legislative Assembly and won 17 constituencies, thus ending Pawan Kumar Chamling's 25-year rule in Sikkim.

Indra Hang Subba won the Sikkim Lok Sabha constituency by defeating his nearest rival of Sikkim Democratic Front Dek Bahadur Katwal 12,443 margin.

=== 2024 election ===
They contested on all 32 constituencies while aligning with the National Democratic Alliance in Sikkim Legislative Assembly and won 31 out of 32 seats in a landlide.

Indra Hang Subba won the Sikkim Lok Sabha constituency by defeating his nearest rival Bharat Basneet of Citizen Action Party – Sikkim by a margin of 80,830 votes.

== Electoral performance ==
Lok Sabha election, Sikkim

Election	Lok sabha	Party leader	Seats contested	Seats won	Change in seats	Overall votes %	Vote % in seat contested	-/+ in vote	ref
2014	16th	Prem Singh Tamang	1	0 / 543	Steady		39.47	▲	
2019	17th	Prem Singh Tamang	1	1 / 543	▲1		47.76	▲	
2024	18th	Prem Singh Tamang	1	1 / 543	Steady	0.03	42.71	▲	

Sikkim Legislative Assembly election

Election	Assembly	Party leader	Seats contested	Seats won	Change in seats	Overall votes %	-/+ in Vote	ref
2014	9th	Prem Singh Tamang	32	10 / 32	▲10	42.07	▲	
2019	10th	Prem Singh Tamang	32	17 / 32	▲7	47.03	▲	
2024	11th	Prem Singh Tamang	32	31 / 32	▲14	58.38	▲	

== List of party leaders ==
=== Presidents ===
No.	Portrait	Name (Birth–Death)	Term in office		
No.	Portrait	Name (Birth–Death)	Assumed office	Left office	Time in office
1		Prem Singh Tamang (b. 1968)	4 February 2013	Incumbent	13 years, 234 days

== Legislative leaders ==
=== List of chief ministers ===
==== Chief Ministers of Sikkim ====
No.	Portrait	Name (Birth–Death)	Term in office			Assembly (Election)	Elected constituency	Ministry
No.	Portrait	Name (Birth–Death)	Assumed office	Left office	Time in office	Assembly (Election)	Elected constituency	Ministry
1		Prem Singh Tamang (b. 1968)	27 May 2019	9 June 2024	7 years, 122 days	10th (2019)	Poklok–Kamrang	Tamang I
1		Prem Singh Tamang (b. 1968)	10 June 2024	Incumbent	7 years, 122 days	11th (2024)	Rhenock	Tamang II

== Frontal Organisation ==
- Sikkim Krantikari Krishak Morcha
- Sikkim Krantikari Nari Morcha
- Sikkim Krantikari Yuva Morcha
- Sikkim Krantikari Shramik Morcha
- Sikkim Krantikari Vidyarthi Morcha
- Sikkim Krantikari Vyapari Morcha
- Sikkim Krantikari Chalak Morcha
- Sikkim Krantikari Avakashprapta Sainik Morcha
- Sikkim Krantikari Avakashprapta Karmachari Morcha

== See also ==
- List of political parties in India
- Prem Singh Tamang ministry
