= Jayatar =

- City
- Location in Nepal Jayatar (Nepal)
- Coordinates: 27.878725°N 83.931419°E
- Country: Nepal
- Province: Gandaki Province
- District: Syangja District
- Municipality: Chapakot

Area
  - Total: 0.71 km^{2} (0.27 sq mi)

Population (2011 Nepal census)
  - Total: 150
  - Density: 210/km^{2} (550/sq mi)
  - Ethnicities: Brahmin
- Time zone: UTC+5:45 (Nepal Time)
- Area code: +977-63
- HQ: Sultalitar of Chapakot

Jayatar is a city in Sankhar within the Chapakot Municipality of the Syangja District of Gandaki Province in Nepal. According to the 2011 Nepal census, it had a population of 150.
