= Mohami =

Mohami मोहमी
- City
- Location in Nepal Mohami (Nepal)
- Coordinates: 27°54′21″N 83°56′05″E
- Country: Nepal
- Province: Gandaki Province
- District: Syangja District
- Municipality: Chapakot

Area
  - Total: 1.21 km^{2} (0.47 sq mi)

Population (2011 Nepal census)
  - Total: 339
  - Density: 280/km^{2} (726/sq mi)
  - Ethnicities: Brahmin Chhetri Gurung
- Time zone: UTC+5:45 (Nepal Time)
- Area code: +977-63
- HQ: Sultalitar of Chapakot

Mohami is a City of Sankhar in Chapakot of Syangja District of Gandaki Province in Nepal. At the time of the 2011 Nepal census, it had a population of 339 people residing in 75 individual households.

== Climate ==
Bhattarai Danda

Climate chart (precipitation, max. and min. temperature)
J	F	M	A	M	J	J	A	S	O	N	D
26 17 10	64 21 13	30 27 15	78 30 18	165 29 19	387 29 20	601 26 20	447 25 20	269 24 19	104 24 18	1 21 15	10 17 10
- █ Average max. and min. temperatures in °C
- █ Precipitation totals in mm
Imperial conversion
J	F	M	A	M	J	J	A	S	O	N	D
1 63 50	2.5 70 55	1.2 81 59	3.1 86 64	6.5 84 66	15 84 68	24 79 68	18 77 68	11 75 66	4.1 75 64	0 70 59	0.4 63 50
- █ Average max. and min. temperatures in °F
- █ Precipitation totals in inches
