= Radhadamodar Sanskrit Vidyapeeth =

Nepalese university

Coordinates: 27.879728°N 83.932721°E

Radhadamodar Sanskrit Vidhyapith राधादामोदर संस्कृत विद्यापीठ
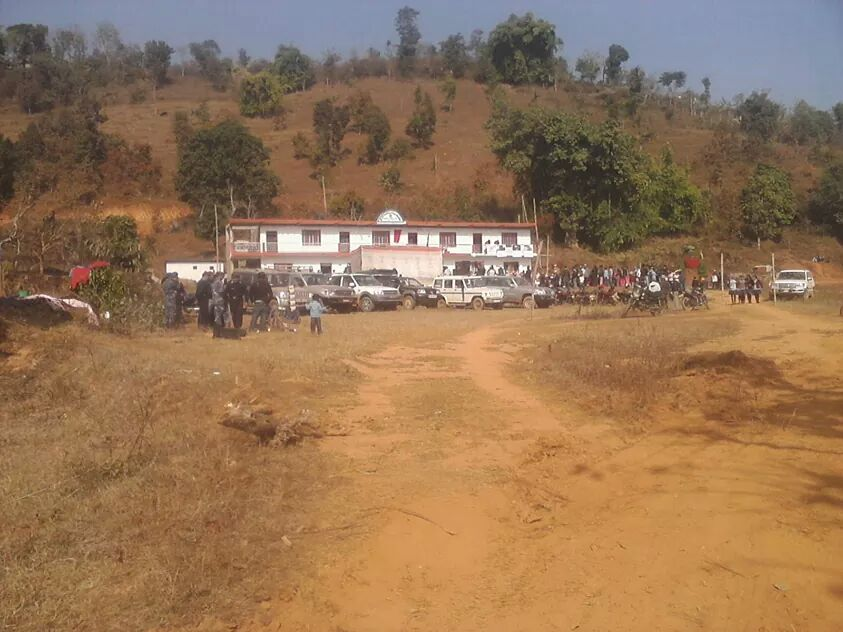
- Campus Building at Jaitar
- Type: Public Coeducational
- Established: 1995
- Chancellor: Prime Minister of Nepal
- Vice-Chancellor: Prof. Khem Raj Khanal
- Academic staff: Sanskrit
- Location: Sankhar, Nepal
- Campus: Keladighat

Radhadamodar Sanskrit Vidyapith is one of affiliated government Sanskrit universities of Nepal Sanskrit University at Jaitar of Sankhar village development committee in Syangja District of Nepal. This campus offers Uttarmadhyama (Intermediate) as well as Shastri (Bachelor) levels of study.
