= Bankata =

- City
- Location in Nepal Bankata (Nepal)
- Coordinates: 27.890806°N 83.891030°E
- Country: Nepal
- Province: Gandaki Province
- District: Syangja District
- Municipality: Chapakot

Area
  - Total: 1.71 km^{2} (0.66 sq mi)

Population (2011 Nepal census)
  - Total: 350
  - Density: 200/km^{2} (530/sq mi)
  - Ethnicities: Brahmin Chhetri Gurung
- Time zone: UTC+5:45 (Nepal Time)
- Area code: +977-63
- HQ: Sultalitar of Chapakot

Bankata is a City of Sankhar in Chapakot of Syangja District of Gandaki Province in Nepal. According to the 2011 Nepal census, it had a total population of 350.
