= Keladighat bridge =

Keladighat bridge केलादीघाट पुल
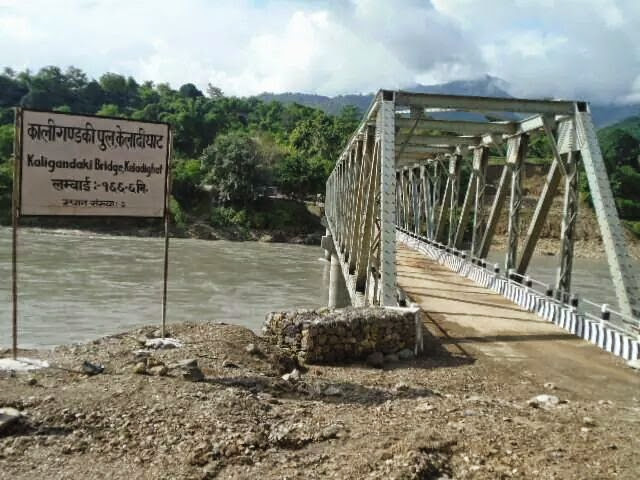
- Coordinates: 27°52′20.0928″N 83°55′52.2840″E
- Carries: Motor vehicles, pedestrians and bicycles
- Crosses: Kali Gandaki River
- Locale: Keladighat, Sankhar, Nepal

Characteristics
- Design: Through arch bridge
- Total length: 166.6 m (547 ft)
- Width: 4.25 m (14 ft)
- Height: 25 m (82 ft)

History
- Construction start: July 2007
- Construction end: April 2014
- Opened: April 2014

Keladighat Bridge is a motor-able bridge over Kali Gandaki river in Keladighat of Syangja District, Gandaki Zone and Gandakidhik of Palpa District, Lumbini Zone, Western Region, Nepal. 166.6 meter long and 4.25 meter wide bridge is completed now.

== Gallery ==
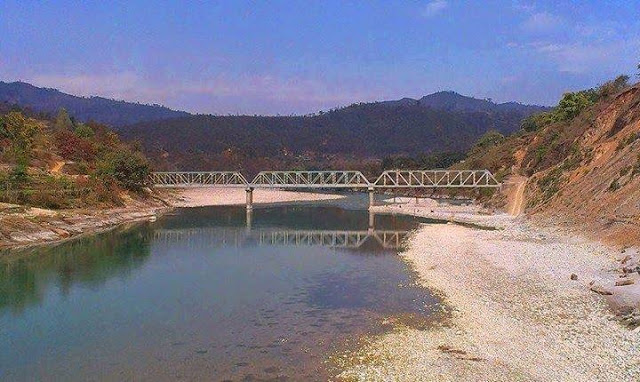
Keladighat bridge view

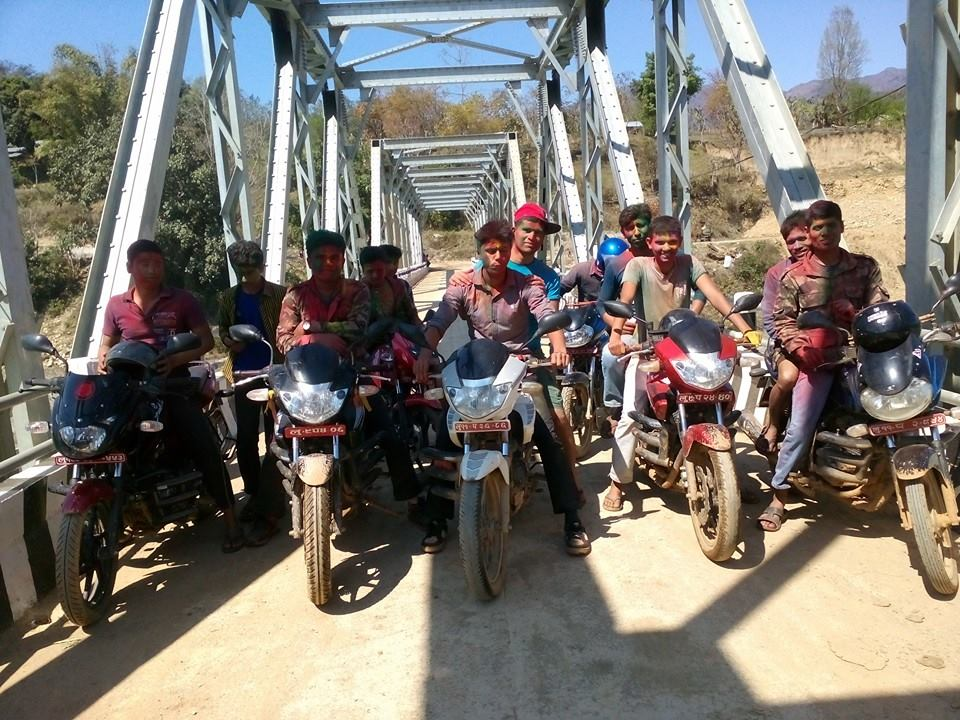
Locals crossing the bridge
