= Raamghat =

- City
- Location in Nepal Raamghat (Nepal)
- Coordinates: 27°52′28″N 83°54′54″E
- Country: Nepal
- Province: Gandaki Province
- District: Syangja District
- Municipality: Chapakot

Area
  - Total: 1.2 km^{2} (0.46 sq mi)

Population (2011 Nepal census)
  - Total: 192
  - Density: 160/km^{2} (410/sq mi)
  - Ethnicities: Brahmin
- Time zone: UTC+5:45 (Nepal Time)
- Area code: +977-63
- HQ: Sultalitar, Chapakot

Raamghat is a city in Chapakot Municipality, located in the Syangja District of Gandaki Province, Nepal. According to the 2011 Nepal census, it had a population of 192.
