= Ajingare =

- City
- Location in Nepal Ajingare (Nepal)
- Coordinates: 27.904929°N 83.946640°E
- Country: Nepal
- Province: Gandaki Province
- District: Syangja District
- Municipality: Chapakot

Area
  - Total: 0.25 km^{2} (0.097 sq mi)

Population (2011 Nepal census)
  - Total: 450
  - Density: 1,800/km^{2} (4,700/sq mi)
  - Ethnicities: Brahmin Chhetri Magar
- Time zone: UTC+5:45 (Nepal Time)
- Area code: +977-63
- HQ: Sultalitar of Chapakot

Ajingare Nepali: अजिंगरे is a City of Sankhar in Chapakot of Syangja District of Gandaki Province in Nepal. According to the 2011 Nepal census, it had a total population of 450.
