= Kuwakot =

Kuwakot may refer to:

- Kuwakot, Gandaki, Nepal
- Kuwakot, Mahakali, Nepal
