= Chapakot Municipality =

Chapakot चापाकोट
- Municipality
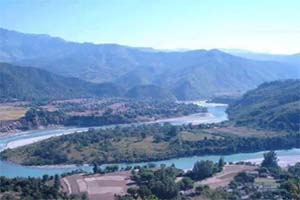
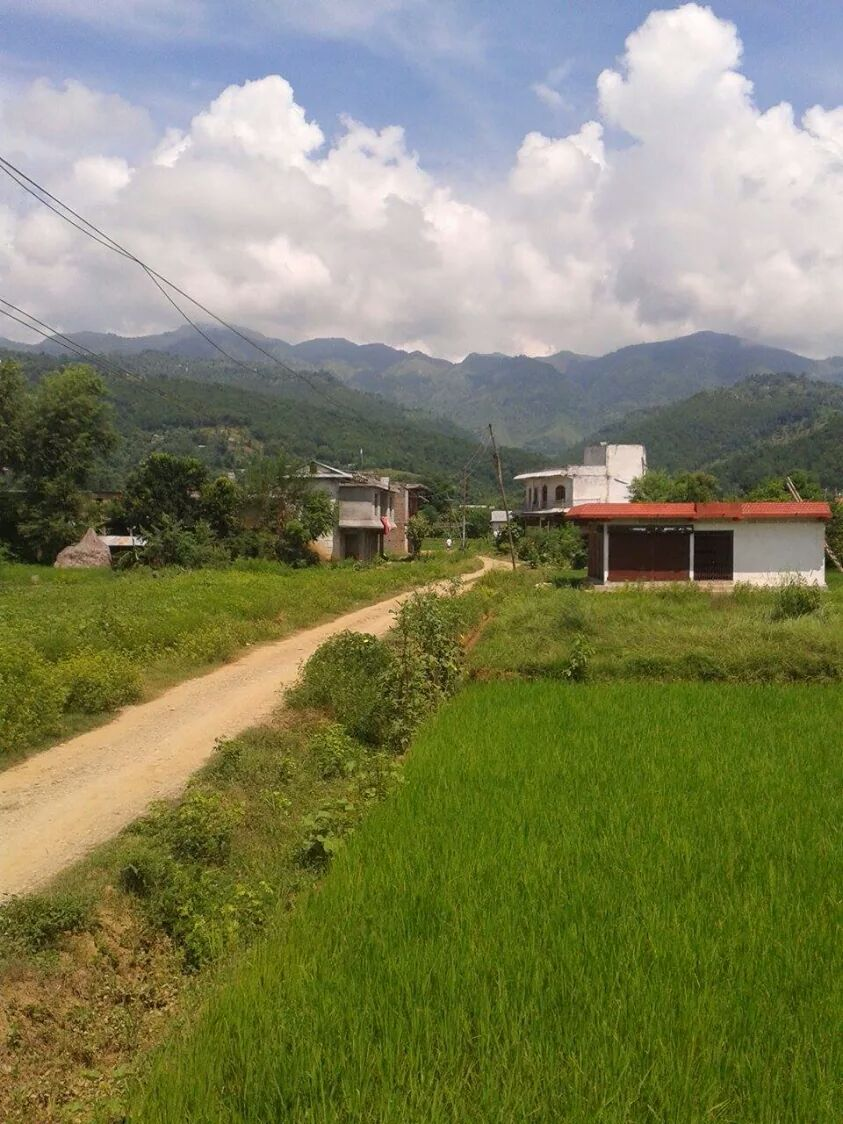
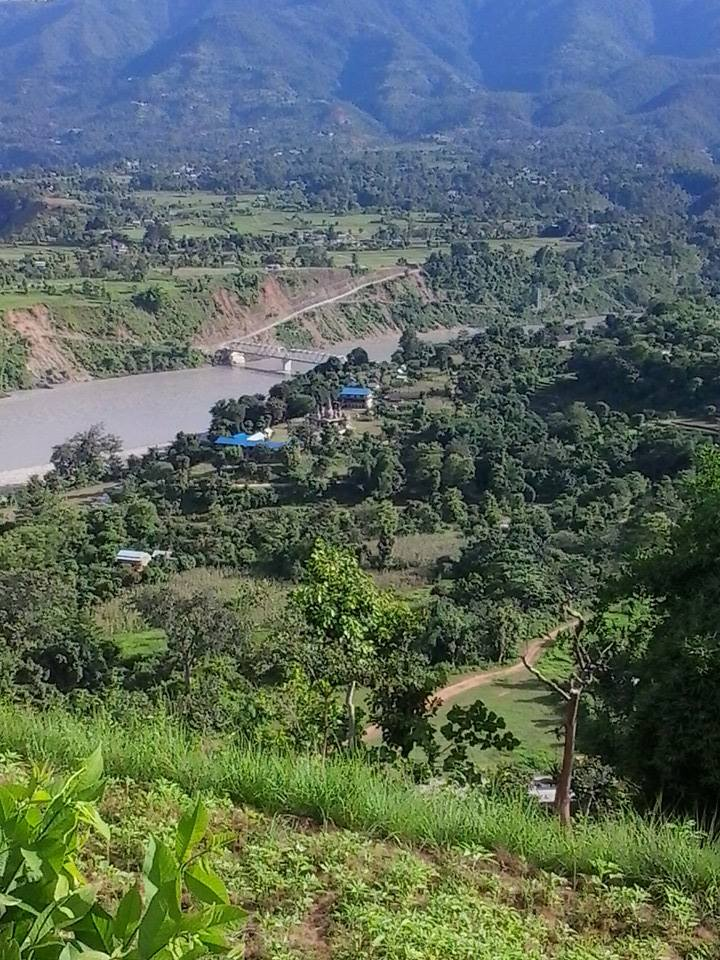
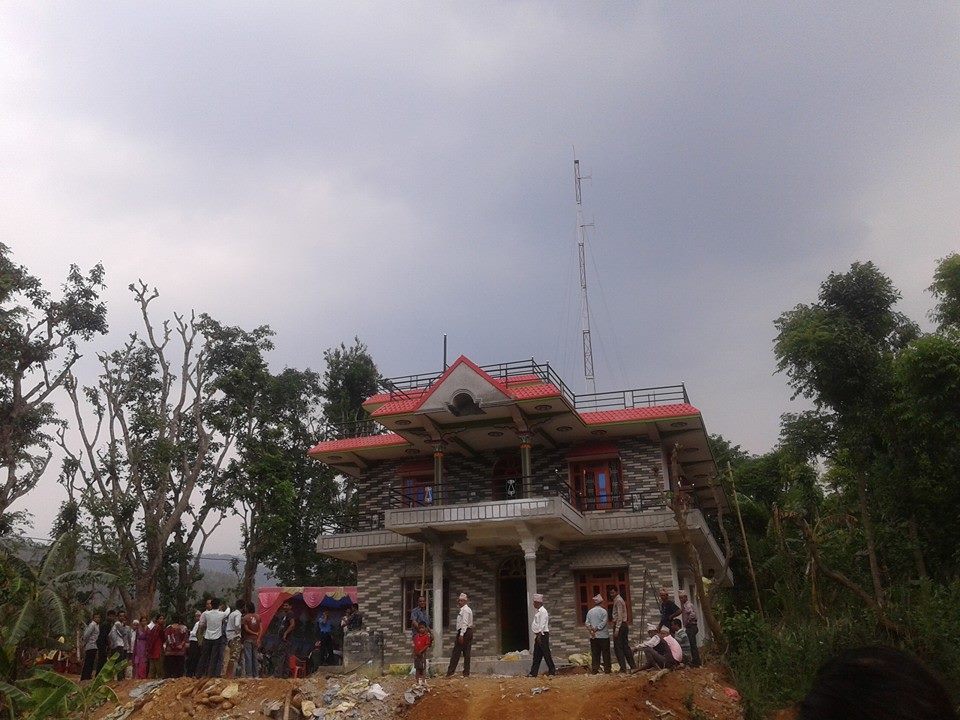
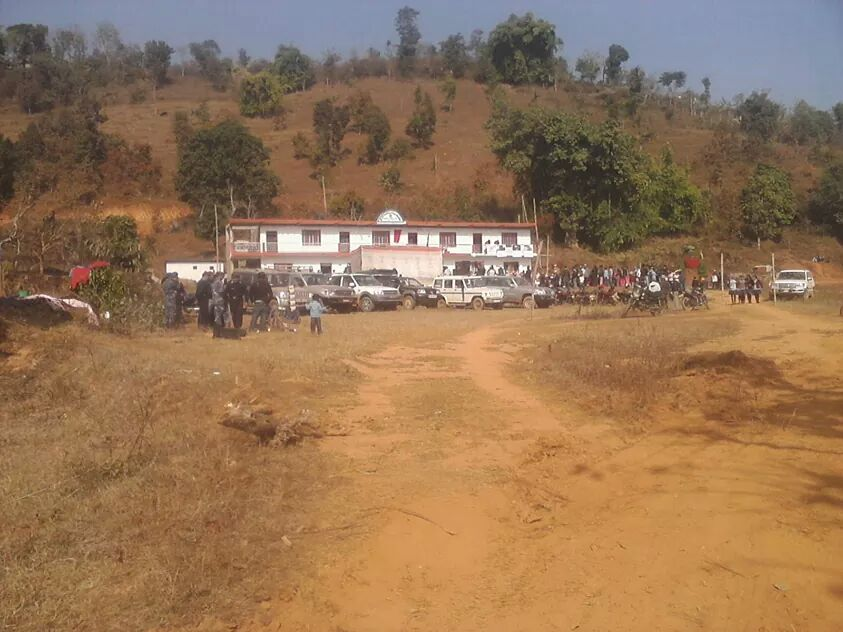
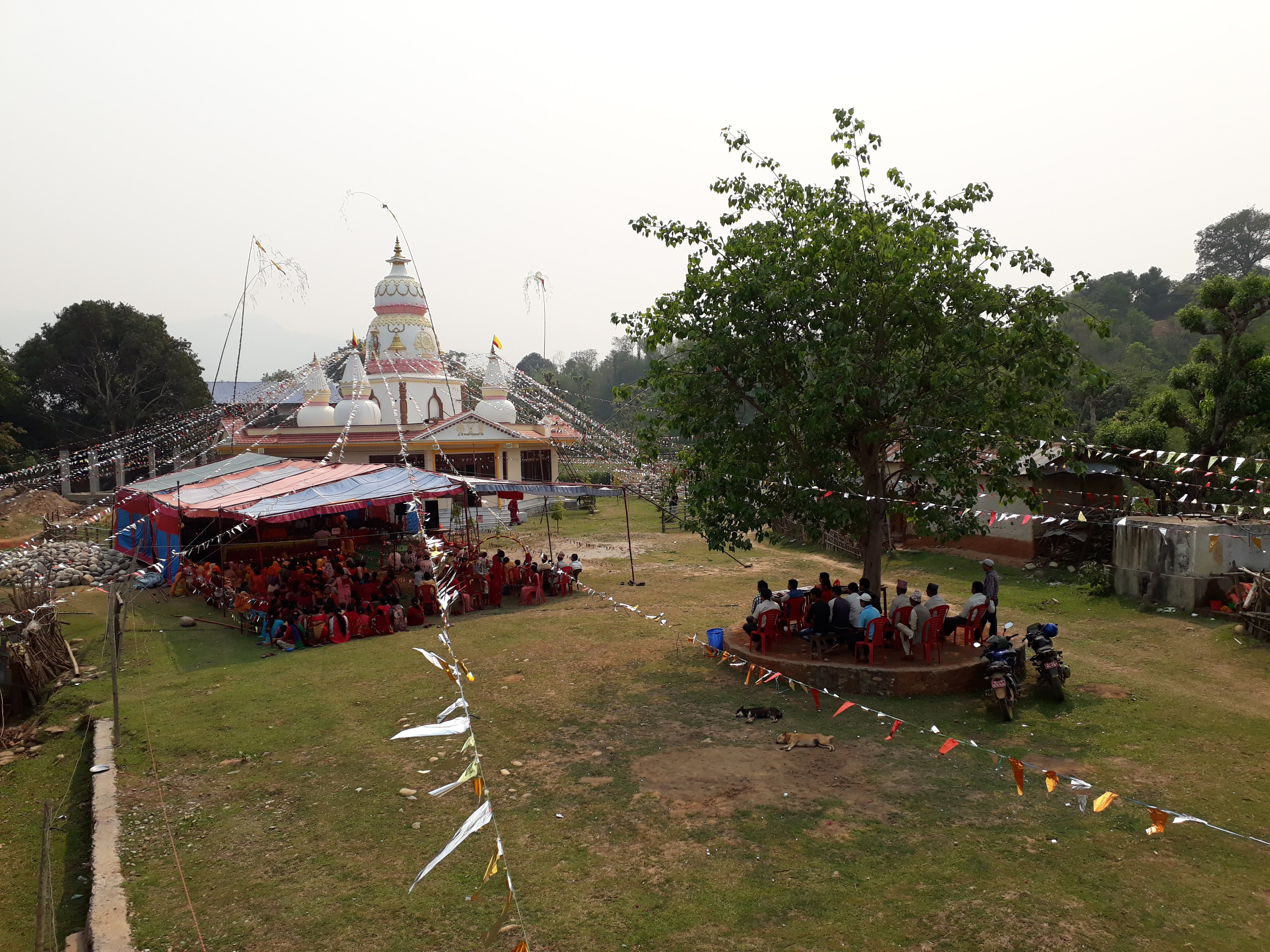
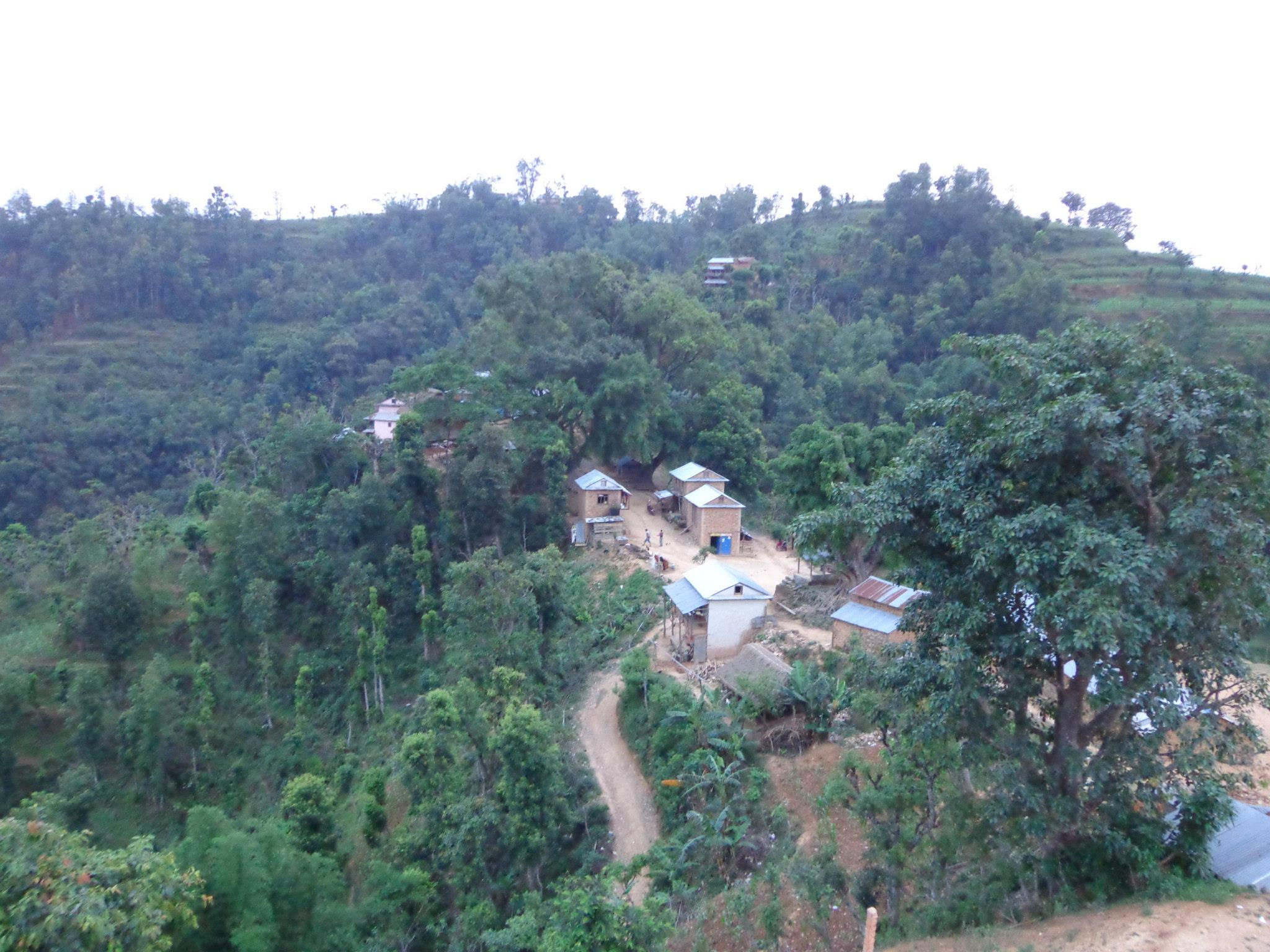
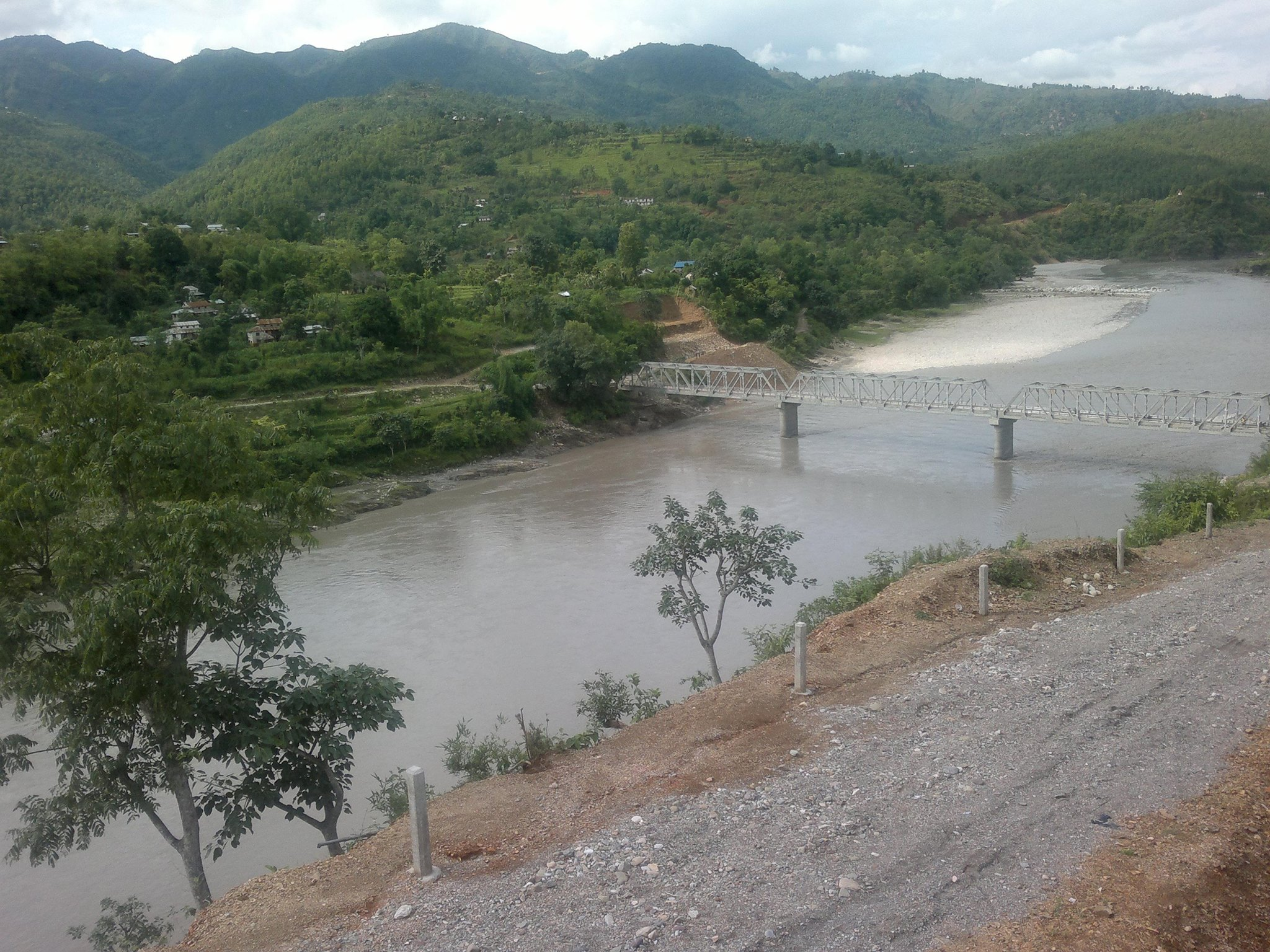
- From Top left to right Gandaki River, Keladighat, Radio Chapakot, Majuwa, Radhadamodar Sanskrit Vidyapeeth, Keladighat Temple, Patsar & Keladighat bridge

- Chapakot Municipality Chapakot (Syangja District) Chapakot (Gandaki Province) Chapakot (Nepal)
- Coordinates: 27.90°N 83.82°E
- Country: Nepal
- Province: Gandaki Province
- District: Syangja District

Government
  - Mayor: Deb Bahadur Khand
  - Deputy Mayor: Isha Rana

Area
  - Total: 120.59 km^{2} (46.56 sq mi)

Population (2011 Nepal census)
  - Total: 26,042
  - Density: 215.95/km^{2} (559.32/sq mi)
- Time zone: UTC+5:45 (NST)
- Website: www.chapakotmun.gov.np

Chapakot (Nepali: चापाकोट) is a municipality in the southeastern part of Syangja District in Gandaki Province of central Nepal. The new municipality was formed by merging three existing villages—Ratnapur, Kuwakot and Chapakot—on 18 May 2014. On 12 March 2017 the government implemented the new local administrative structure consisting of 744 local units. With the implementation of this new local administrative structure, the old structure will no longer be in existence. According to the new structure, VDCs will be replaced with village councils. Newly merged VDCs are Sankhar, Sekham, Ward no. 8 of Pakbadi & Ward no. (1-3, 5-9) of Malyangkot. The office of the municipality is that of the former Chapakot Municipality.

== Population ==
At the time of the 2011 Nepal Census Chapakot village had a population of 4,702 people living in 1087 individual households. But now had a total population of 12,742 people living in 2,902 individual households when Ratnapur and Kuwakot VDCs merged with Chapakot. Now 26,042 peoples are living in an area of 120.59 km^{2}. It is on a plain surrounded by hills. To the east of Chapakot is Tanahun; to the west is Galyang. The Kali Gandaki divides it from Palpa District to the south, and to the north is Waling, Biruwa & Harinas.

== Climate ==
Climate data for Chapakot, elevation 400 m (1,300 ft)
Month	Jan	Feb	Mar	Apr	May	Jun	Jul	Aug	Sep	Oct	Nov	Dec	Year
Mean daily maximum °C (°F)	21.1 (70.0)	23.9 (75.0)	28.8 (83.8)	33.9 (93.0)	34.5 (94.1)	33.5 (92.3)	31.3 (88.3)	31.2 (88.2)	30.7 (87.3)	29.7 (85.5)	26.2 (79.2)	22.3 (72.1)	28.9 (84.1)
Mean daily minimum °C (°F)	8.8 (47.8)	10.1 (50.2)	14.3 (57.7)	19.4 (66.9)	22.0 (71.6)	23.7 (74.7)	23.8 (74.8)	23.6 (74.5)	22.5 (72.5)	19.6 (67.3)	13.2 (55.8)	9.1 (48.4)	17.5 (63.5)
Average precipitation mm (inches)	23.2 (0.91)	24.4 (0.96)	33.8 (1.33)	57.3 (2.26)	140.7 (5.54)	332.7 (13.10)	520.3 (20.48)	377.7 (14.87)	236.7 (9.32)	68.1 (2.68)	7.2 (0.28)	14.7 (0.58)	1,836.8 (72.31)
Source 1: Australian National University
Source 2: Japan International Cooperation Agency (precipitation)
