= Panglung =

Panglung पाङ्लुङ्
- Village
- Location in Nepal Panglung (Nepal)
- Coordinates: 27.904779°N 83.907113°E
- Country: Nepal
- Zone: Gandaki Zone
- District: Syangja District
- City: Sankhar

Population (2011 Nepal census)
  - Total: 541
- Time zone: UTC+5:45 (Nepal Time)
  - Summer (DST): Pokhara

Panglung (Nepali: पाङ्लुङ्) is a village in Sankhar village development committee Ward No-7, Syangja District, Gandaki Province, Nepal. The majority of its people are Brahmins. At the 2011 Nepal census, it had a population of 541, with 261 males and 280 females living in 46 households.
