= Salghari =

Salghari सालघारी
- Village
- Location in Nepal Salghari (Nepal)
- Coordinates: 27.890399°N 83.931419°E
- Country: Nepal
- Zone: Gandaki Zone
- District: Syangja District
- City: Sankhar

Population (2011 Nepal census)
  - Total: 41
- Time zone: UTC+5:45 (Nepal Time)
  - Summer (DST): Pokhara

Salghari (Nepali: सालघारी) is a village in Sankhar village development committee Ward No-5, Syangja District, Gandaki Province, Nepal. According to the 2011 Nepal census, held by Central Bureau of Statistics, it had a total population of 41. There are 20 males and 21 females living in 12 households.
