= Manechaur =

Manechaur मानेचौर
- Village
- Location in Nepal Manechaur (Nepal)
- Coordinates: 27.899092°N 83.946640°E
- Country: Nepal
- Zone: Gandaki Zone
- District: Syangja District
- City: Sankhar

Population (2011 Nepal census)
  - Total: 201
- Time zone: UTC+5:45 (Nepal Time)
  - Summer (DST): Pokhara

Manechaur (Nepali: मानेचौर) is a village in Sankhar village development committee Ward No-4, Syangja District, Gandaki Zone, Nepal. According to the 2011 Nepal census, held by Central Bureau of Statistics, it had a total population of 201.
