= Patasar =

Patasar पटसार
- Village
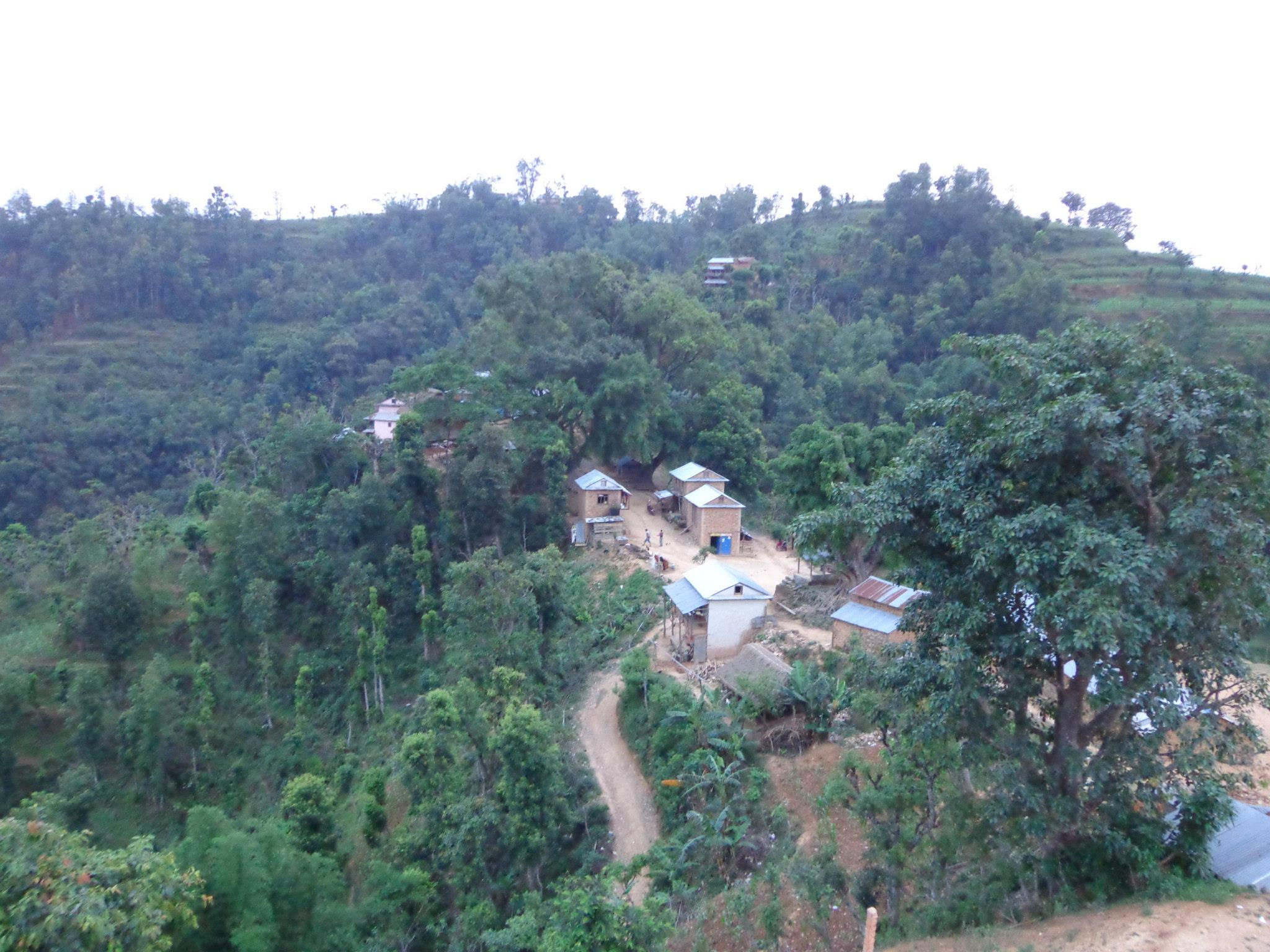

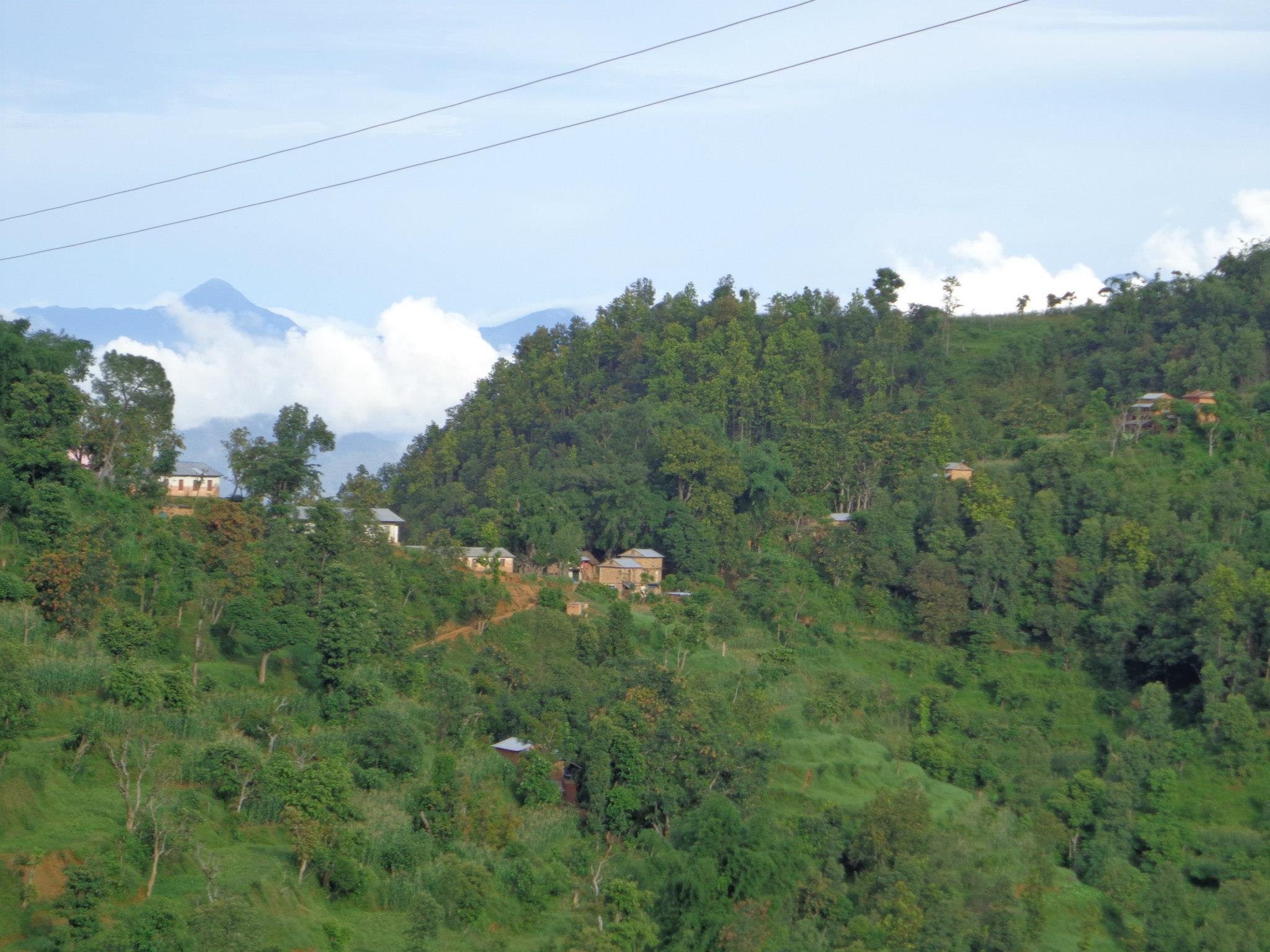
- Village view from Panglung.

- Location in Nepal Patasar (Nepal)
- Coordinates: 27.905166°N 83.918842°E
- Country: Nepal
- Zone: Gandaki Zone
- District: Syangja District
- Village Development Committee: Sankhar

Population (2011)
  - Total: 538
- Time zone: UTC+5:45 (Nepal Time)
  - Summer (DST): Pokhara

Patasar is headquarter village of Sankhar village development committee which is in ward number 7 of Syangja District, Gandaki Zone, Western Region, Nepal. According to the Nepal Census 2011 it had a total population of 538, with 216 males and 322 females residing in 124 individual households.
