= Murchaur =

Murchaur मुर्चौर
- Village
- Location in Nepal Murchaur (Nepal)
- Coordinates: 27.882893°N 83.913707°E
- Country: Nepal
- Zone: Gandaki Zone
- District: Syangja District
- City: Sankhar

Population (2011 Nepal census)
  - Total: 261
- Time zone: UTC+5:45 (Nepal Time)
  - Summer (DST): Pokhara

Murchaur (Nepali: मुर्चौर) is a village in Sankhar village development committee Ward No-9, Syangja District, Gandaki Zone, Nepal. According to the 2011 Nepal census, held by Central Bureau of Statistics, it had a total population of 241.
