= Samakot =

Samakot सामाकोट
- Village
- Location in Nepal Samakot (Nepal)
- Coordinates: 27.919286°N 83.941346°E
- Country: Nepal
- Zone: Gandaki Zone
- District: Syangja District
- City: Sankhar

Population (2011 Nepal census)
  - Total: 261
- Time zone: UTC+5:45 (Nepal Time)
  - Summer (DST): Pokhara

Samakot (Nepali: सामाकोट) is a village in Sankhar village development committee Ward No-2, Syangja District, Gandaki Zone, Nepal. According to the 2011 Nepal census, held by Central Bureau of Statistics, it had a total population of 141. There are 120 males and 261 females living in 82 households.
