= Sankhar =

Sankhar साँखर
- Village development committee
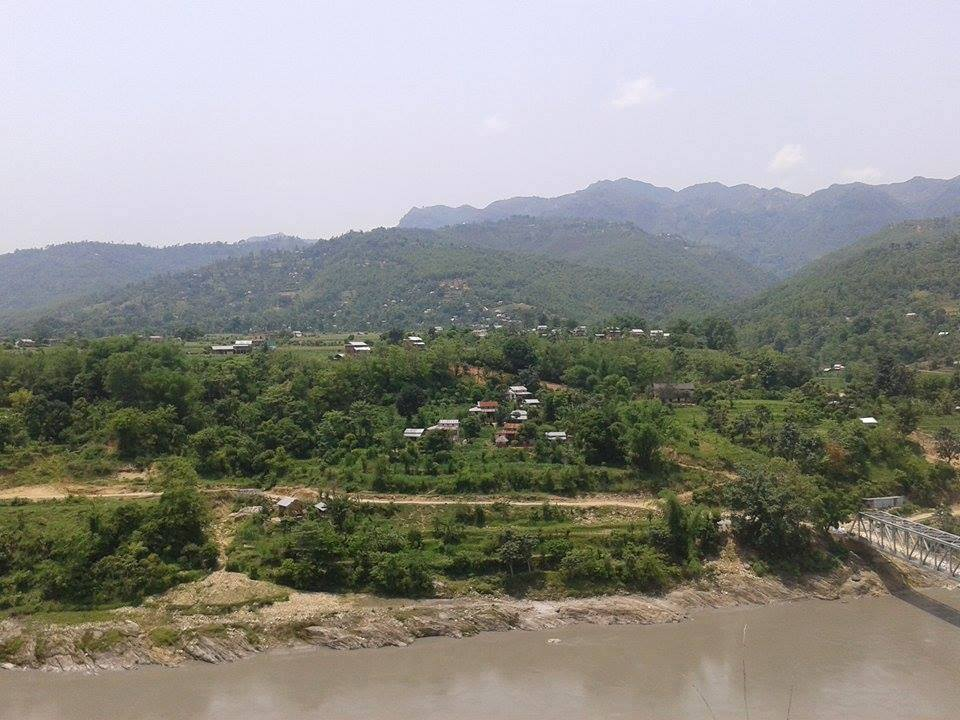
- Sankhar view from Gandakidhik, Palpa

- Location in Nepal Sankhar (Nepal)
- Coordinates: 27.89653°N 83.92149°E
- Country: Nepal
- Province: Gandaki Province
- District: Syangja District
- Municipality: Chapakot

Population (2011)
  - Total: 4,630
- Time zone: UTC+5:45 (Nepal Time)
- Area code: 063

Sankhar is a village development committee in Chapakot Municipality of Syangja District in Gandaki Province of central Nepal. At the time of the 2011 Nepal census it had a population of 4,630 people residing in 1,055 individual households. Majuwa, Mohami, Bhattarai Danda, Keladighat, Patasar, Panglung, Salghari, Manechaur, Khasa Bankata, Pipalchhap, Khardi, Samakot, Tangle, Gahate, Ajingare, and Hadiban are major villages in Sankhar.

== Climate ==
Sankhar

Climate chart (precipitation, max. and min. temperature)
J	F	M	A	M	J	J	A	S	O	N	D
26 17 10	64 21 13	30 27 15	78 30 18	165 29 19	387 29 20	601 26 20	447 25 20	269 24 19	104 24 18	1 21 15	10 17 10
- █ Average max. and min. temperatures in °C
- █ Precipitation totals in mm
Imperial conversion
J	F	M	A	M	J	J	A	S	O	N	D
1 63 50	2.5 70 55	1.2 81 59	3.1 86 64	6.5 84 66	15 84 68	24 79 68	18 77 68	11 75 66	4.1 75 64	0 70 59	0.4 63 50
- █ Average max. and min. temperatures in °F
- █ Precipitation totals in inches

== Tourism ==
Kali Gandaki river flows through some villages of Sankhar such as Bankata, Murchaur, Majuwa, Bhattarai Danda, at the edge of Keladighat. Kali Gandaki itself is known for rafting. Many tourists visit Sankhar each year for rafting. Tourists can go for trekking as Sankhar is surrounded by hills on all sides. The view of mountain Makalu and Annapurna has added more beauty to Sankhar. The tourism industry has not yet been developed because of the lack of resources. For visiting tourists in Sankhar the most known and most famous places which are known as Keladighat and Ramghat. Keladighat is the historical place by the point of view for tourism. In Keladighat, there is a temple and different parks to visit. In temple Radha Krishna is worshiped in 24 hours nonstop. Most of the people go there to worship as they said their wishes are fulfilled. Majuwa is mainly known as the heart of Sankhar as it has plain land with fertile land for agriculture. But, nowadays it is developing to a highly populated area. Mohami, a village in Sankhar, is famous for its historical place because it had a palace for royal family at the period of kingship in Nepal.

== Political situation ==
Sankhar is divided into nine wards. It is surrounded by Kali Gandaki at northern side, Gajarkot VDC from east, Sekham and Chimnebas VDCs from west and Kyakami VDC at south. Patasar is its headquarter. Keladighat Temple (known as the second heaven by the locals) is situated at the northern side of Sankhar which is near from Kali Gandaki river. It lies in ward number 6 of Sankhar.

== Education ==
The Shree Radha Damodar Gyan Jyoti Sanskrit Higher Secondary School is the major high school in the village.

== Bridge ==
A newly constructed motor-able bridge mainly benefits the people around Syangja, Palpa, Nawalparasi, Tanahun and almost all people of nearby districts. These days, buses, trucks and tractors ply through the bridge in hundreds of numbers on daily basis. And, the bridge has brought new dimensions for the economic development of the nearby VDCs which were lagging behind and inaccessible until few years ago.
