= Keladighat =

Village in Gandaki Zone, Nepal

Keladighat केलादीघाट Keladi
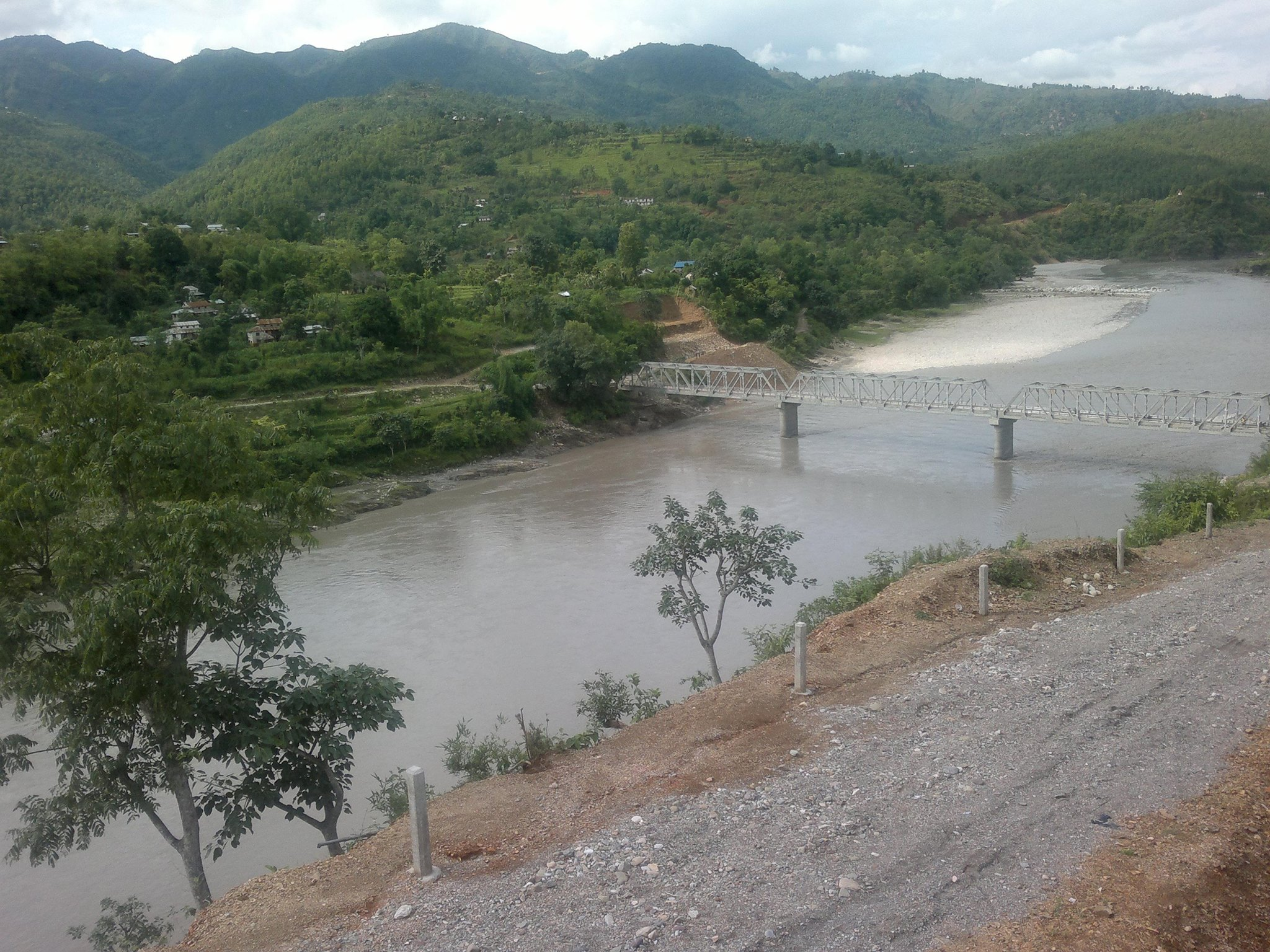
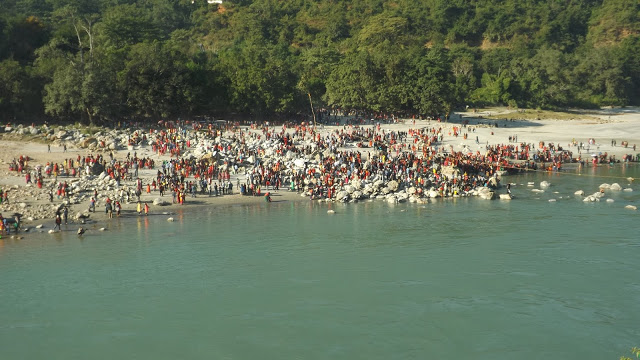
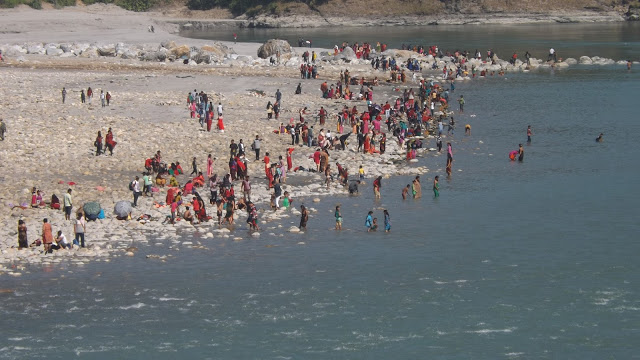
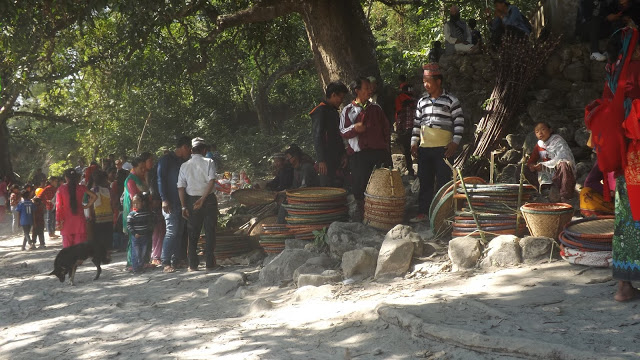
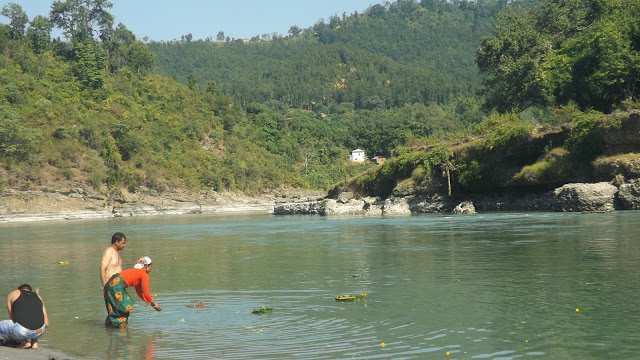
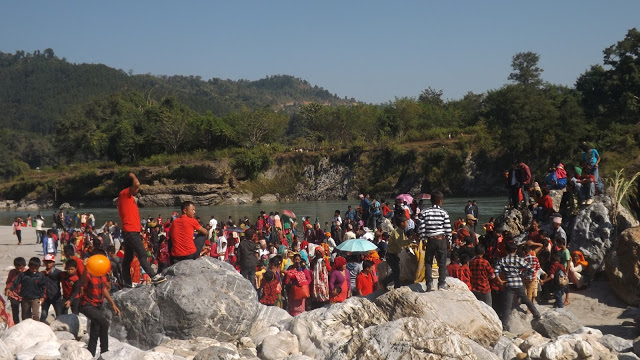
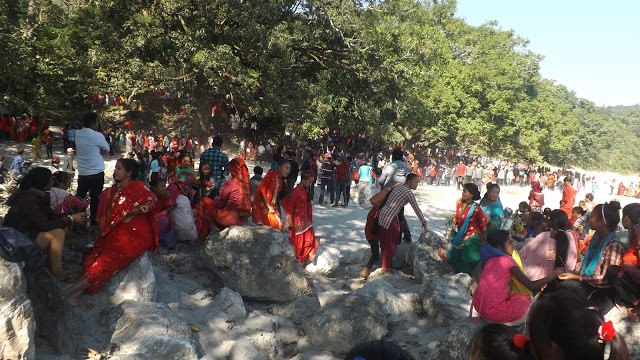
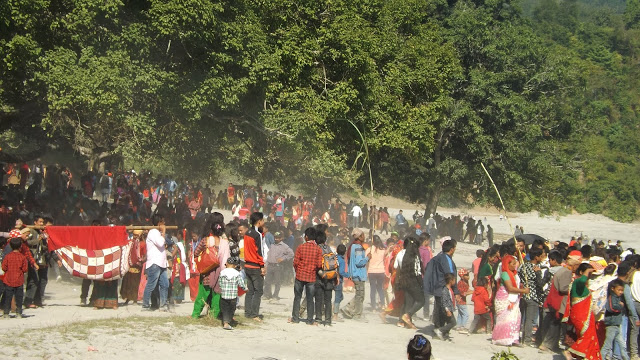
- Holy place & beach in Keladighat

- Location in Chapakot
- Coordinates: 27.873939°N 83.930426°E
- Country: Nepal
- Zone: Gandaki Zone
- District: Syangja District
- VDC: Sankhar

Population (2011)
  - Total: 250
- Time zone: UTC+5:45 (Nepal Time)

Keladi is a village in Sankhar VDC at Ward No-6, Nepal.

It is considered as a historical place, and is known for the Radha Krishna Temple, where there are nonstop hymns (kirtan) and preaching for 24 hours by saints living in ashrams.

== Geography ==
Keladi is located at the eastern edge, which is the last border of Syangja separated by a stream called Maidi Khola, which separates two districts Syangja and Tanahun. It is bordered by Majuwa to the east, Bhattarai Danda to the north, and Palpa to the south. Kali Gandaki motorable bridge, Keladighat, connects Syangja and Palpa.

== Notable heritage ==
Radha Damodar Temple: is the historical temple built at the bank of Krishna Gandaki river. It is one of the main centers of Nimbarka sampradaya built by Shree 1008 Golokbasi Bhagawat Sharan Devacharya Maharaj. The new temple has been recently constructed. The temple complexes have historical "Dharmashala", has statue of Maharaj ji. Temple has played leadership role in the development projects in this region. Protection of the lands and properties of this temple has been facing challenges. This responsibility has now gone to the general people for the protection of the historic heritage and development of the temple properties.

Radha Damodar Sanskrit College: is one of the state of the art Sanskrit college in this region. Hundreds of teachers, technical manpower, government officials, saints attended the high school and college.

Shree 1008 Golokbasi Bhagawat Sharan Maharaj Ji: was one of the great saints of south Asia in his time. He was a great spiritual leader, teacher, healer, mentor and saints. He played important leadership role in establishing "Bhajankuti" in Vrindaban, India. He established several other ashrams in Nepal like Radha Krishna Shanti Ashram, Tallo Gagan Gauda, Kaski. He played important role in establishing ashrams in Devghat, Nepal and Guhawati, India. His students and followers are all around India and Nepal. Many of his students were great saints, politicians, government officials, teachers, social workers.

Shree 108 Gopal Sharan Devacharya Maharaj ji is currently the "Mahanta" of the temple. He was completed Acharya (Master's degree) in Vedanta at Sampurnananda University, Vrindavandham, UP, India. He is a great devotee of Radha Krishna. He is lifelong vegetarian and has residual paralysis due to the polio when he is at age of 3 yr old. He actively participates in Saptaha, Ekah, Bhagawat Prabachan and helps people through social work. He also actively participates in teaching students and Shree Radha Krishna devotees. He has been deeply involved in saving Krishna Gandaki River and developing her as International Hindu Destination.

Krishna Gandaki River: is one of the holiest river in Hindu religion. Shalagram Sheela is only found in this river. There is growing concern for the illegal trafficking of the shalgarm Sheela, destruction of the river banks and pollution of the river due to urbanization of the nearby cities without proper infrastructures. There is growing concern on negative impact on the region's cultural, religious, biodiversity and environment due to the proposed Krishna Gandaki diversion.

Radha Damodar Old Age Home: is the newly established old age home in the temple premises under the assistance of the Government of Nepal. Sustainability, expansion of this home with quality care has been burning issue at this juncture.

Radha Damodar Hospital serves the local community, an adjacent religious center, and a nearby elderly care facility in Keladidham. The facility requires additional healthcare personnel, including a family physician, nursing staff, and a physical therapist. Planned expansions for the site include a dedicated laboratory and a 25-bed hospital building.

== Transportation ==
- Public buses
- Taxis

These facilities are available from Butwal Bus Terminal, Pokhara Bus Park, Gongabu Bus Park, Waling Bus Park as well as Galyang, Bhimad Bus Park and as far as Kathmandu, the national capital.

== Tourism ==
Tourism lacks full support from the government. However, local political leaders are aware and have launched rafting from Ramdi to Chapakot, Keladi to as far as Devghat.

== Attraction ==
Keladighat adds more significance to the village as because at some Hindu festivals like Maghe sankranti, Haribodhni ekadashi, Teej, there would be some cultural and historical programs. In such cultural and historical ceremonies people come for entertaining as well as for business trades.

== Shaligram Sheela ==
Keladidham is famous for Shaligram Sheela. Hindu devotees feel fortunate to worship Sheela as an incarnation of Lord Bishnu.

== Non Violence Zone ==
Keladidham believes in non-violence. Any kind of violence against animals is prohibited in this area. Use of alcohol or smoking recreational drugs or cigarettes are strictly prohibited.

== Shree Bhagawat Sharan Devacharya Global Center for Spiritual Health ==
Keladidham is famous for her peacefulness and silence. Meditation all round the year is practiced here. Meditation and yoga are not only way interact with eternal soul but way of healthy and fruitful living in human life. Meditation and yoga has been considered as an integral part of modern medicine. It has been considered an art of healing for the many psychosocial, mental, chronic and non-healing ailments. Purpose of this institution will be to focus on both therapeutic, preventive health aspects of meditation and it further research in nurturing human life.

== Shree Gopal Sharan Devacharya Global Center for Alternative Medicine ==
Different fields of alternative medicine such as ayurveda, natural healing, yoga has been existent in this subcontinent many thousands year back. Role of this institution will be to provide holistic, therapeutic care to the underserved peoples with compassion and empathy. Further research to develop evidence based medicine will be conducted to develop traditional systems of healing.

== Museum of the Peace and Tolerance ==
Keladighat has been the symbol of the eternal peace and tolerance since ancient time. Purpose of the museum will be to highlight the importance of tolerance for the permanent peace and harmony in the world.

== Keladighat Observatory ==
Astronomy has been a long tradition in Hindu culture. More research in the field of astronomy has been felt and Vedic students are expected to do more research in this field.

== Radha Krishna End of Life Care Center ==
Goal of this center will be to ease end of life and provide comfort care. To achieve end of life with dignity, palliative and hospice care establishment will be the goal of this institution. In order to protect the environment and reduce pollutions, establishment of electric cremation of human body after death has been planned.

== Radha Rani Global Center for Vastu Shastra ==
Goal of this institution is to enhance further research in the field of Vastu Shastra through scientific study based on Vedic principles. It has been expected to bring the peace, harmony and prosperity in each family.

== Nimbarka Global Center for Shalgram Studies ==
Religious, spiritual and scientific importance of "Shalgram Sheela" has been uncomparable. This institution will focus on further research in this field to embrace deep knowledge on the ancient history, physics, chemistry and geology in relation to the Krishna Gandaki River. It is expected to enrich Hindu religion all around the globe.
