= Bhattarai Danda =

- City
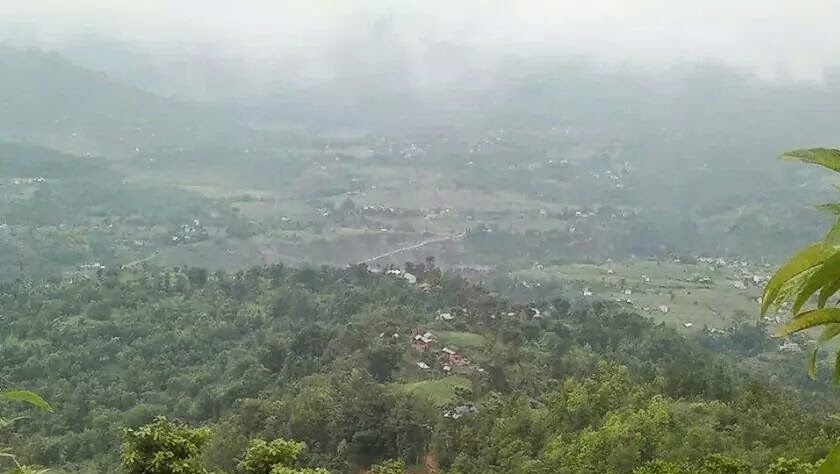
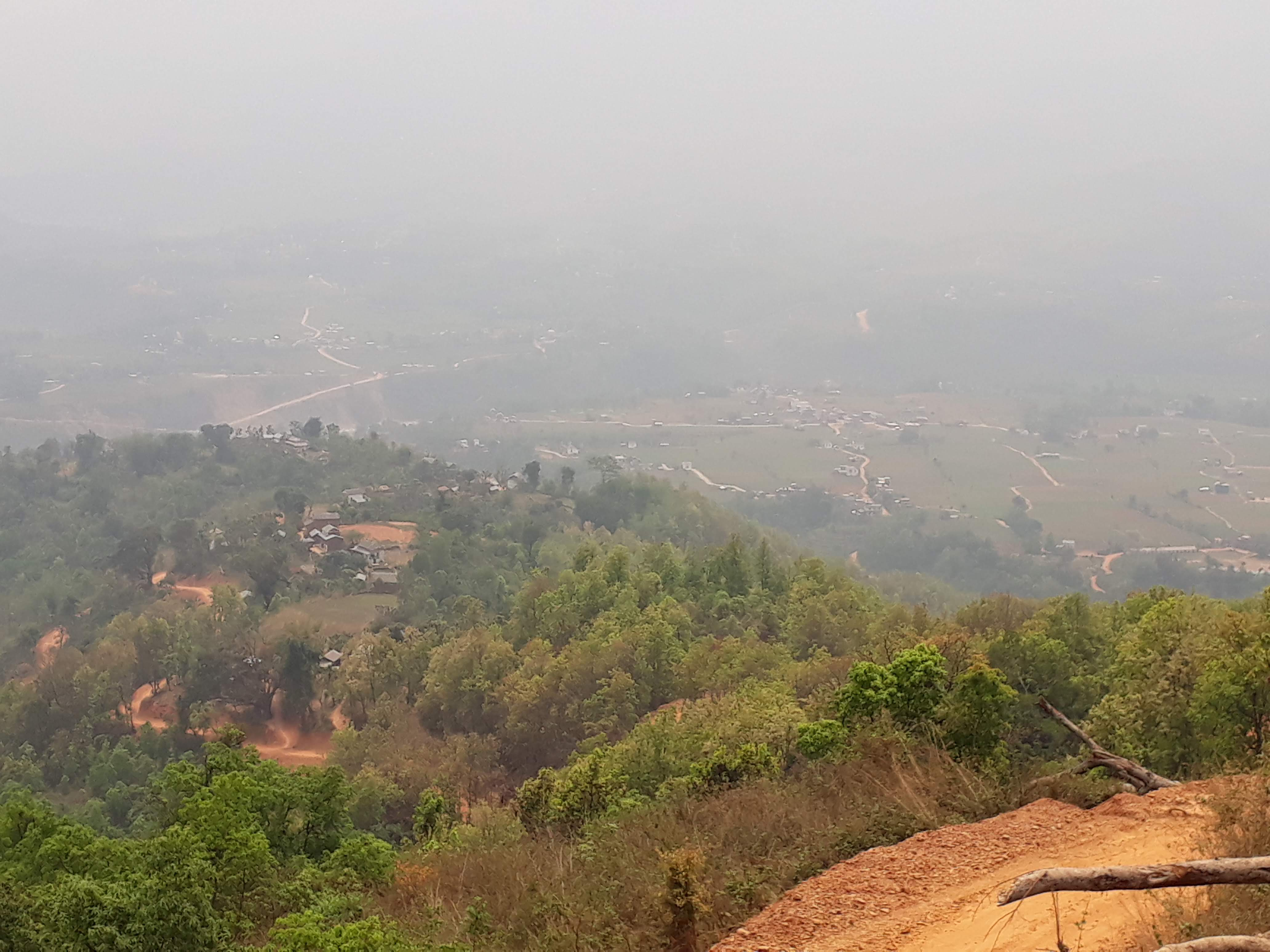
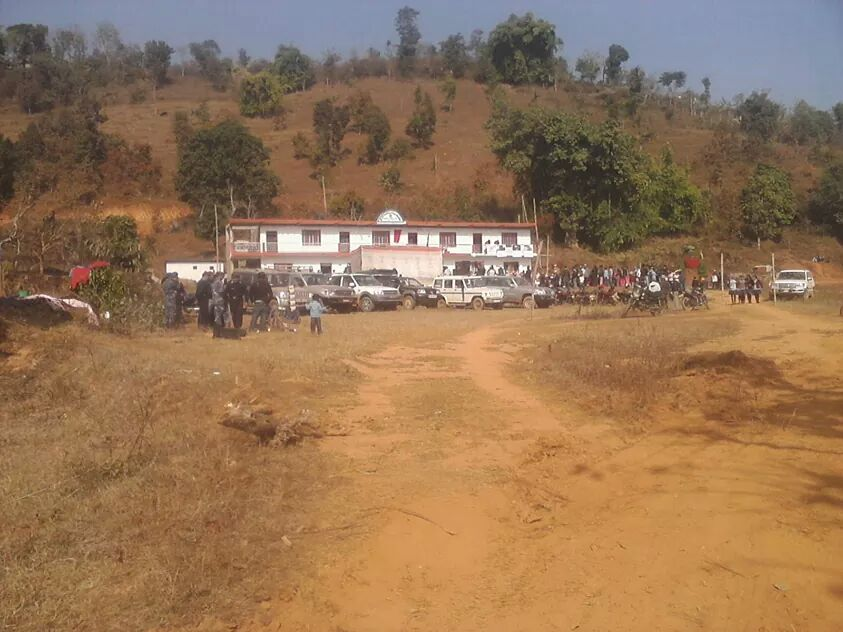
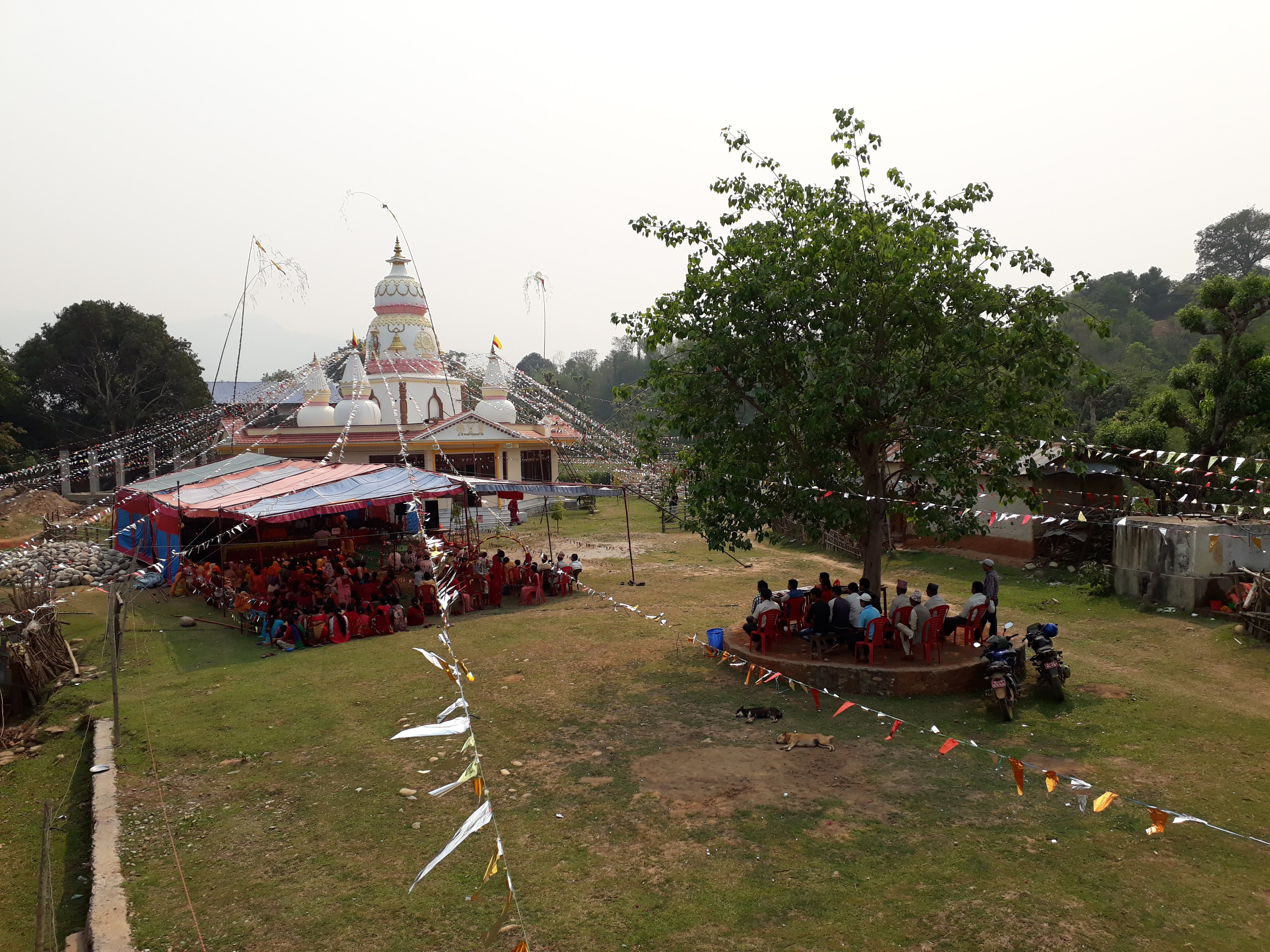
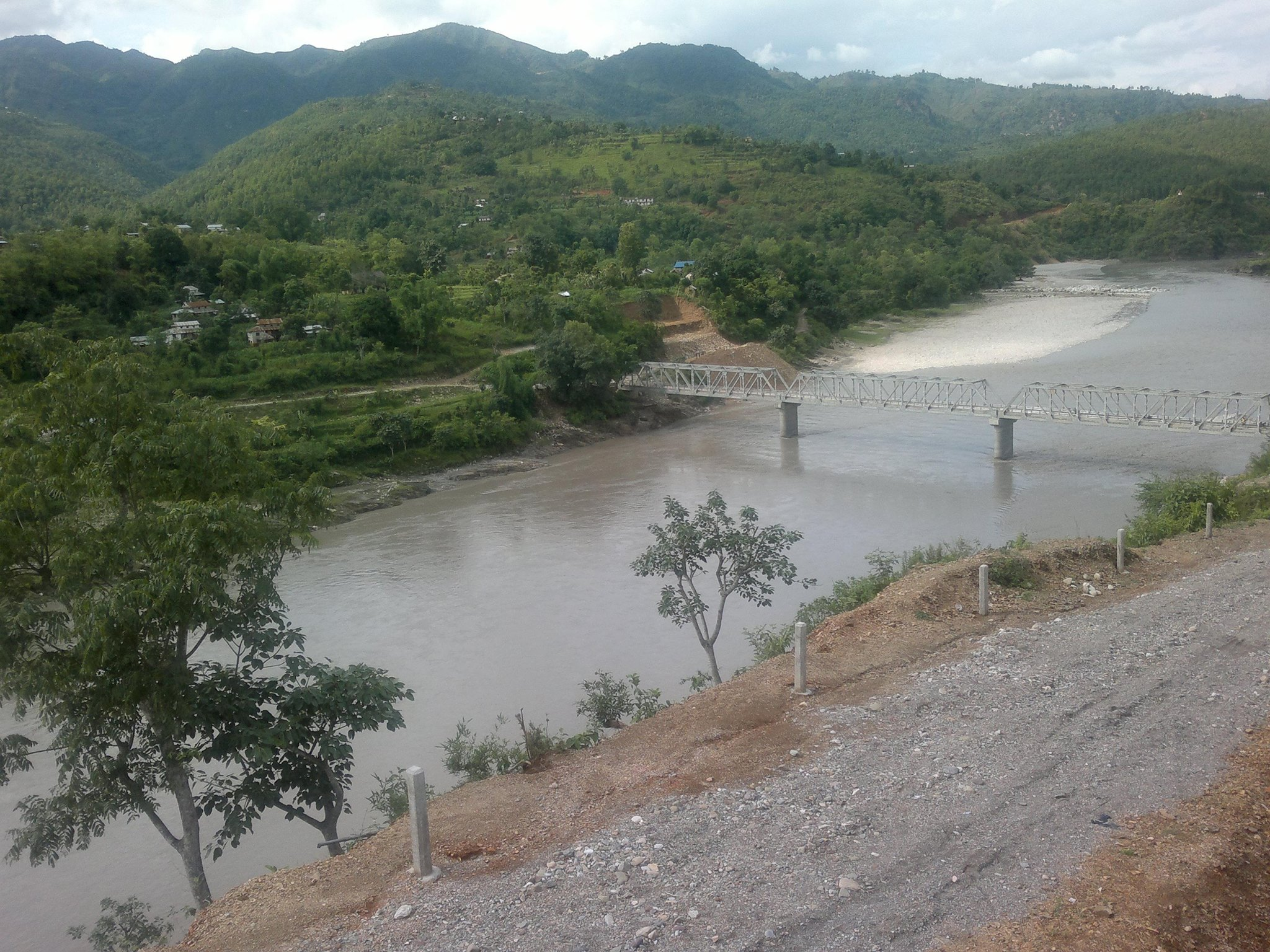
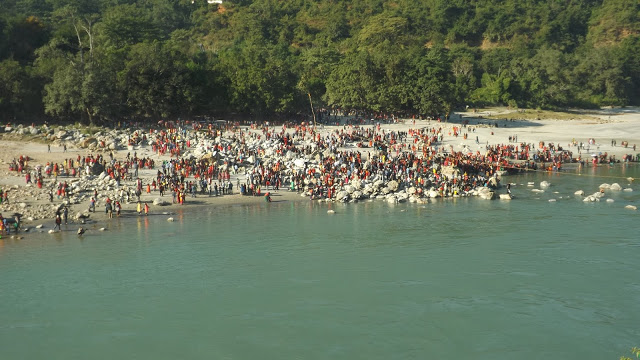
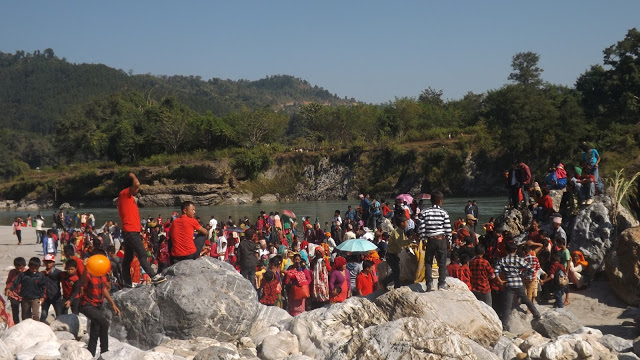
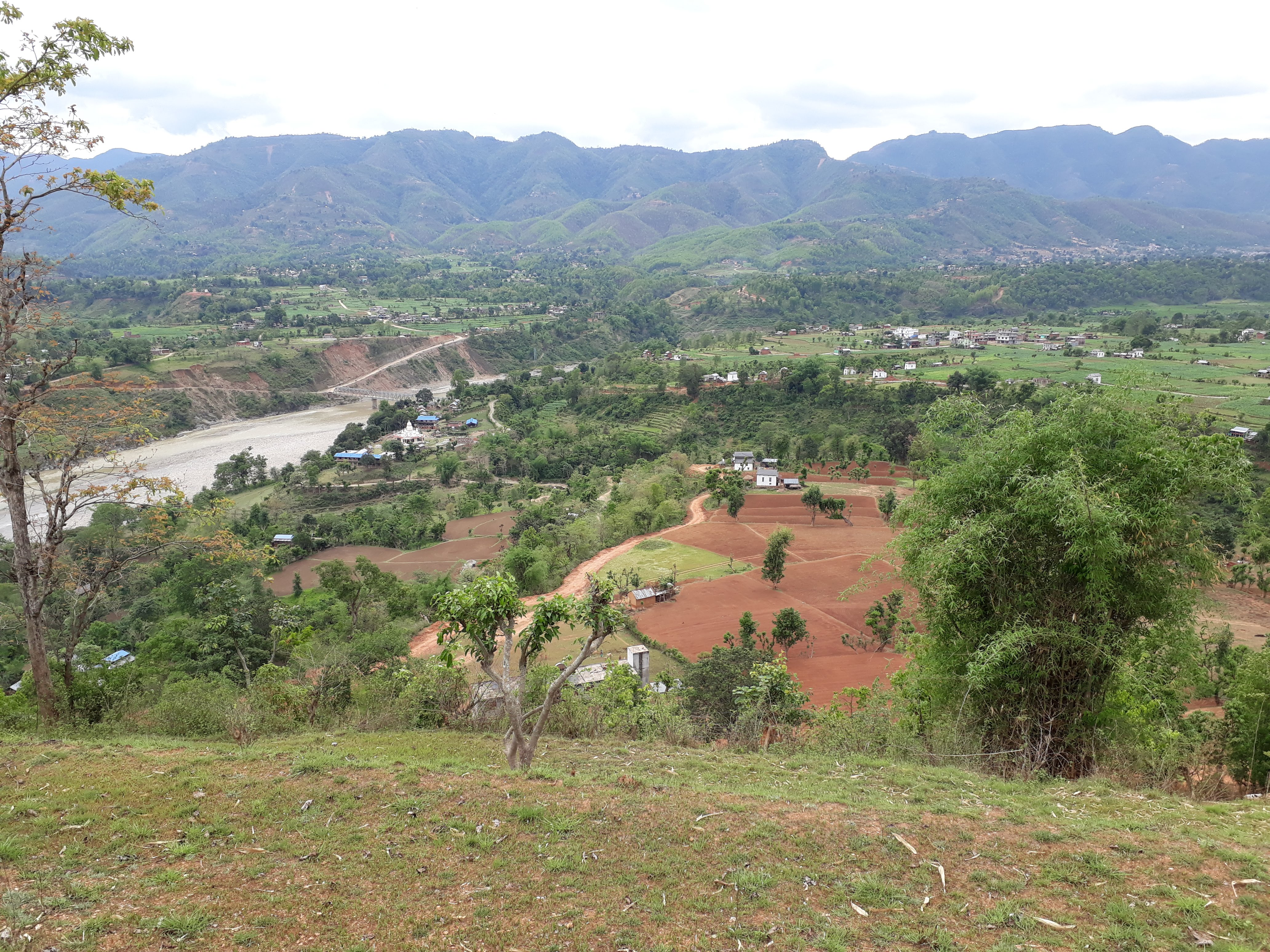
- From Top left to right Populated places in Bhattarai Danda

- Location in Chapakot
- Coordinates: 27°52′59″N 83°55′52″E
- Country: Nepal
- Province: Gandaki
- District: Syangja
- Municipality: Chapakot
- Ward No.: 6

Area
  - Total: 2.15 km^{2} (0.83 sq mi)

Population (2011 Nepal census)
  - Total: 5,510
  - Density: 2,560/km^{2} (6,640/sq mi)
  - Ethnicities: Brahmin Chhetri Gurung
- Time zone: UTC+5:45 (Nepal Time)
  - Summer (DST): Pokhara

Bhattarai Danda Nepali: भट्टराई डाँडा is a City in Syangja District in Nepal. The majority of its people are Brahmins and they are Bhattarai families, so the entire village is named accordingly. According to the 2011 Nepal census, held by the Central Bureau of Statistics, it had a total population of 5510. There are 2,610 males and 2,800 females living in 846 households.

== Education ==
Primary education is provided by Shree Gandaki Primary School. Secondary education is provided by Rivervalley Mathematics Anon Solution - RMAS
