= Sekham =

Sekham सेखाम
- Village development committee
- Location in Nepal Sekham (Nepal)
- Coordinates: 27.92°N 83.88°E
- Country: Nepal
- Zone: Gandaki Zone
- District: Syangja District

Population (2011)
  - Total: 4,183
- Time zone: UTC+5:45 (Nepal Time)

Sekham is a village development committee in Syangja District in the Gandaki Zone of central Nepal. At the time of the 2011 Nepal census it had a population of 4183 people living in 924 individual households.
