= Kuwakot, Syangja =

Kuwakot, Gandaki कुवाकोट
- Location in Nepal Kuwakot, Gandaki (Nepal)
- Coordinates: 27.91°N 83.79°E
- Country: Nepal
- Zone: Gandaki Zone
- District: Syangja District

Population (1991)
  - Total: 4,580
- Time zone: UTC+5:45 (Nepal Time)

Kuwakot, Gandaki is a Market center in Chapakot Municipality in Syangja District in the Gandaki Zone of central Nepal. At the time of the 1991 Nepal census it had a population of 4,580 people living in 759 individual households.
