= Majuwa, Nepal =

Majuwa मजुवा
- Village
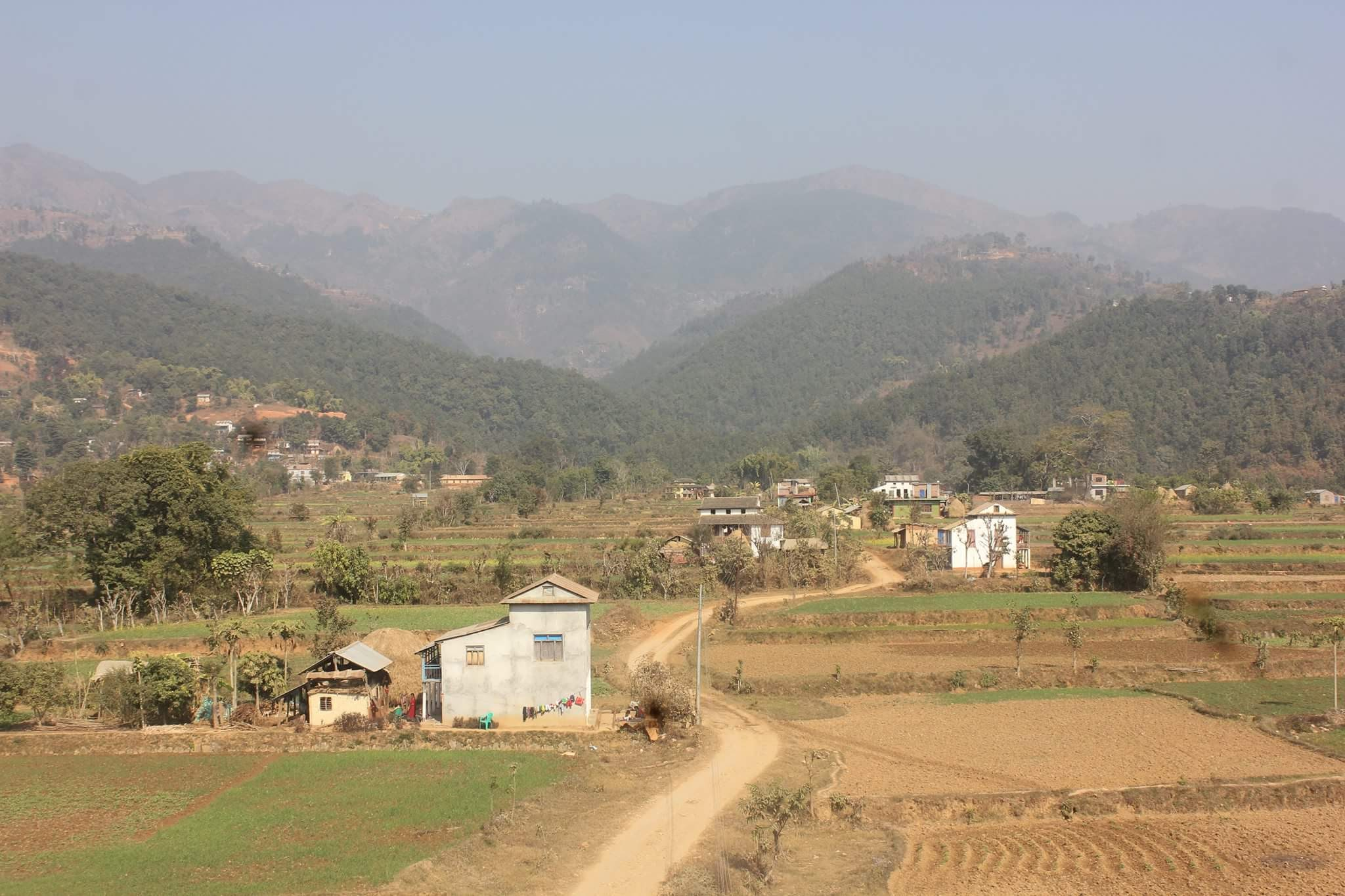
- Majuwa

- Location in Nepal Majuwa (Nepal)
- Coordinates: 27.876216°N 83.924138°E
- Country: Nepal
- Zone: Gandaki Zone
- District: Syangja District
- Village Development Committee: Sankhar

Population (2011)
  - Total: 551
- Time zone: UTC+5:45 (Nepal Time)

Majuwa is a village in Sankhar VDC, Ward No. 6, Syangja District, Gandaki Zone, Nepal. At the time of the Nepal Census 2011, it had a population of 551 people residing in 146 individual households. Dihi, Ambote, Devithan such are sub-localities of this village.
