= List of Buddhist monasteries in Sikkim =

This is a partial list of Buddhist monasteries in the Indian state of Sikkim. (Note: Gulia 2007 states there is a total of 77 monasteries in Sikkim.)

Name	District	Established
Amba Mamring Monastery	East Sikkim	1929
Bakcham Monastery	East Sikkim	1966
Bongyong Ani Gonpa	East Sikkim	2005
Burtuk Ugen Pemacholing Monastery	East Sikkim	2000
Choten Monastery	East Sikkim	1946
Dichen Choling Monastery	East Sikkim	1987
Dolepchen Boudha Sanskrit Monastery	East Sikkim	1991
Duchi Gyalton Monastery	East Sikkim	2002
Enchey Monastery	East Sikkim	1840
Kagon Tshechhogling Monastery	East Sikkim	1977
Kathog Dorjeden Monastery	East Sikkim	1840
Khatek Pema Choling Monastery	East Sikkim	1985
Lingdok Tsangkhar Monastery	East Sikkim	1862
Lingdum Zurmang Monastery	East Sikkim	1999
Linkoed Monastery	East Sikkim	1840
Martam Namdzong	East Sikkim	1917
Martam Tsangkhar Monastery	East Sikkim	1951
Old Rumtek Monastery	East Sikkim	1734
Pabyuk Monastery	East Sikkim	1875
Pandam Monastery	East Sikkim	1955
Pathing Matsang Monastery	East Sikkim	1860
Radong Tensung Monastery	East Sikkim	1959
Raloong Monastery	East Sikkim	1956
Ray Mindu Katenling Monastery	East Sikkim	1873
Rinak Monastery	East Sikkim	1841
Rumtek Dharma Chakra Centre	East Sikkim	1962
Samdong Mintokgang Monastery	East Sikkim	1913
Sang Monastery	East Sikkim	1912
Sang-Ngor Monastery	East Sikkim	1961
Simig Monastery	East Sikkim	1843
Singtam Monastery	East Sikkim	1992
Sumon Thubten Gatsalling Monastery	East Sikkim	1924
Taglung Domsumling Monastery	East Sikkim	1987
Taktse Ani Gonpa	East Sikkim	1980
Thumon Monastery	East Sikkim	1921
Tingkye Gonjang Monastery	East Sikkim	1981
Tsangek Monastery	East Sikkim	1888
Tsulakhang Monastery	East Sikkim	1898
Karthok Monastery	East Sikkim	
Rhenock Monastery	East Sikkim	
Simik Monastery	East Sikkim	
Barphog Monastery	North Sikkim	1957
Gor Monastery	North Sikkim	2002
Hee Gyathang Monastery	North Sikkim	1914
Kabi Monastery	North Sikkim	1911
Labrang Monastery	North Sikkim	1844
Lachen Monastery	North Sikkim	1858
Lachen Thangu Monastery	North Sikkim	1947
Lachung Monastery	North Sikkim	1850
Lingthem Gonpa	North Sikkim	1857
Malam Monastery	North Sikkim	1928
Nage Monastery	North Sikkim	1937
Phensang Monastery	North Sikkim	1721
Phodong Monastery	North Sikkim	1734
Ringyim Monastery	North Sikkim	1852
Shagyong Monastery	North Sikkim	1940
Ship Kunzang Choling Monastery	North Sikkim	1900
Silem Phagyal Monastery	North Sikkim	1967
Singchit Ngadag Monastery	North Sikkim	1890
Sontam Tensung Monastery	North Sikkim	1884
Tareng Gonpa	North Sikkim	1929
Tholung Monastery	North Sikkim	1789
Tingbung Monastery	North Sikkim	1843
Tsawang Choling Monastery	North Sikkim	1936
Tsungthang Monastery	North Sikkim	1788
Chawayng Ani Monastery	North Sikkim	
Ben Monastery	South Sikkim	1902
Bon Monastery	South Sikkim	1980
Bumtar Namdroling Monastery	South Sikkim	1939
Burmiok Norbugang Monastery	South Sikkim	1992
Doling Monastery	South Sikkim	1718
Gagyong Monastery	South Sikkim	2005
Kewzing Monastery	South Sikkim	1974
Linge Phagyal Monastery	South Sikkim	1862
Malli Tashi Chodarling Monastery	South Sikkim	1915
Mangbro Monastery	South Sikkim	1790
Namthang Norbu Tsho-Ling Monastery	South Sikkim	1914
Namthang Nyima Choling Monastery	South Sikkim	1997
Namtse Ahaley Monastery	South Sikkim	1948
Namtse Nga-Dag Monastery	South Sikkim	1684
Parbing Monastery	South Sikkim	1935
Rabong Kunphenling Tsechu Monastery	South Sikkim	1972
Rabong Monastery	South Sikkim	2006
Ralong Monastery	South Sikkim	1730
Ralong Palchen Choling Monastery	South Sikkim	1995
Sangmo Sharchog Bephug Monastery	South Sikkim	1921
Serdup Choling Monastery	South Sikkim	1967
Sorok Tamang Monastery	South Sikkim	1962
Suiram Risung Monastery	South Sikkim	1995
Tekling Dzokchen Monastery	South Sikkim	1936
Wok Pabong Monastery	South Sikkim	1915
Yangang Changchub Tamu Monastery	South Sikkim	1982
Yangang Gonpa	South Sikkim	1787
Namchi Monastery	South Sikkim	
Tendong Gumpa	South Sikkim	
Aden Wolung Monastery	West Sikkim	1913
Chakung Monastery	West Sikkim	1847
Dodak Tamu Monastery	West Sikkim	2005
Dubde Monastery	West Sikkim	1647
Hungri Monastery	West Sikkim	1922
Khachoedpalri Monastery	West Sikkim	1760
Lhuntse Monastery	West Sikkim	1850
Melli-Atsing Monastery	West Sikkim	1740
Nubling Monastery	West Sikkim	1875
Okhery Monastery	West Sikkim	1949
Pemayangtse Monastery	West Sikkim	1650-1651
Rinchen Choling Tamu Monastery	West Sikkim	1996
Rinchenpung Monastery	West Sikkim	1730
Sanga Choeling Monastery	West Sikkim	1649-1650
Silnon Monastery	West Sikkim	1716
Sri Badam Monastery	West Sikkim	1976
Tashi Samboling Tamang Monastery	West Sikkim	1967
Tashiding Monastery	West Sikkim	1651
Bermiok Monastery	West Sikkim	1873

== Notes ==
Dates in list above are from National Informatics Center unless footnoted.
