= Human uses of fish =

Fish in human culture

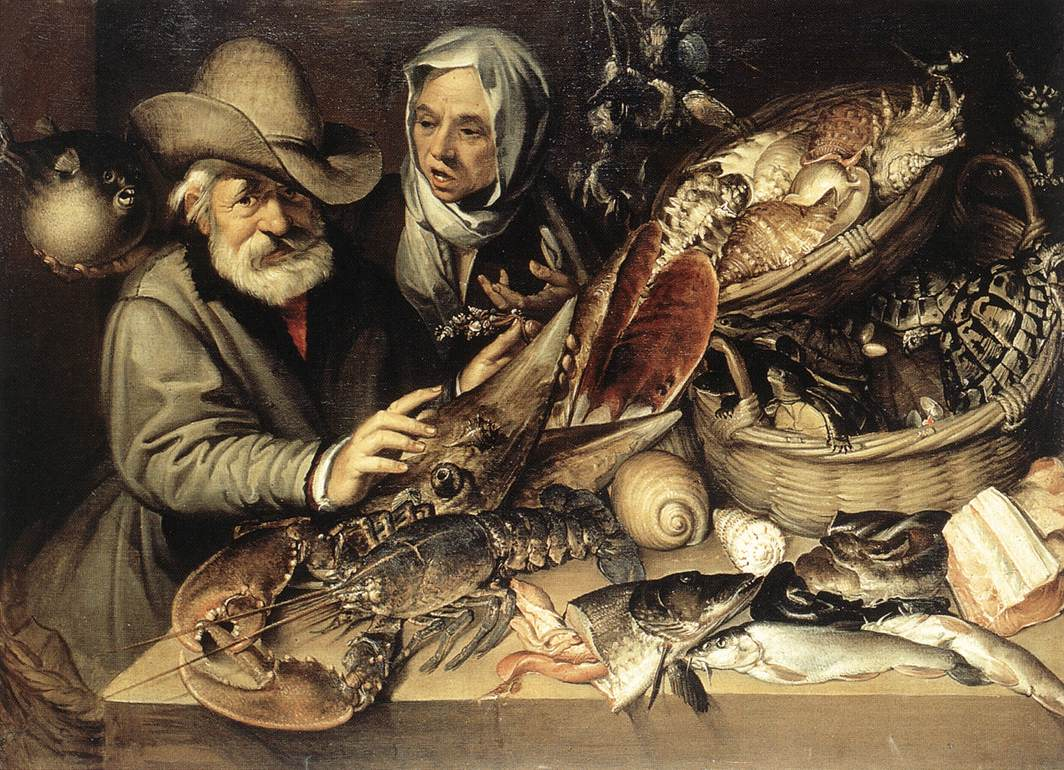
The Fishmonger's Shop, Bartolomeo Passerotti, 1580s

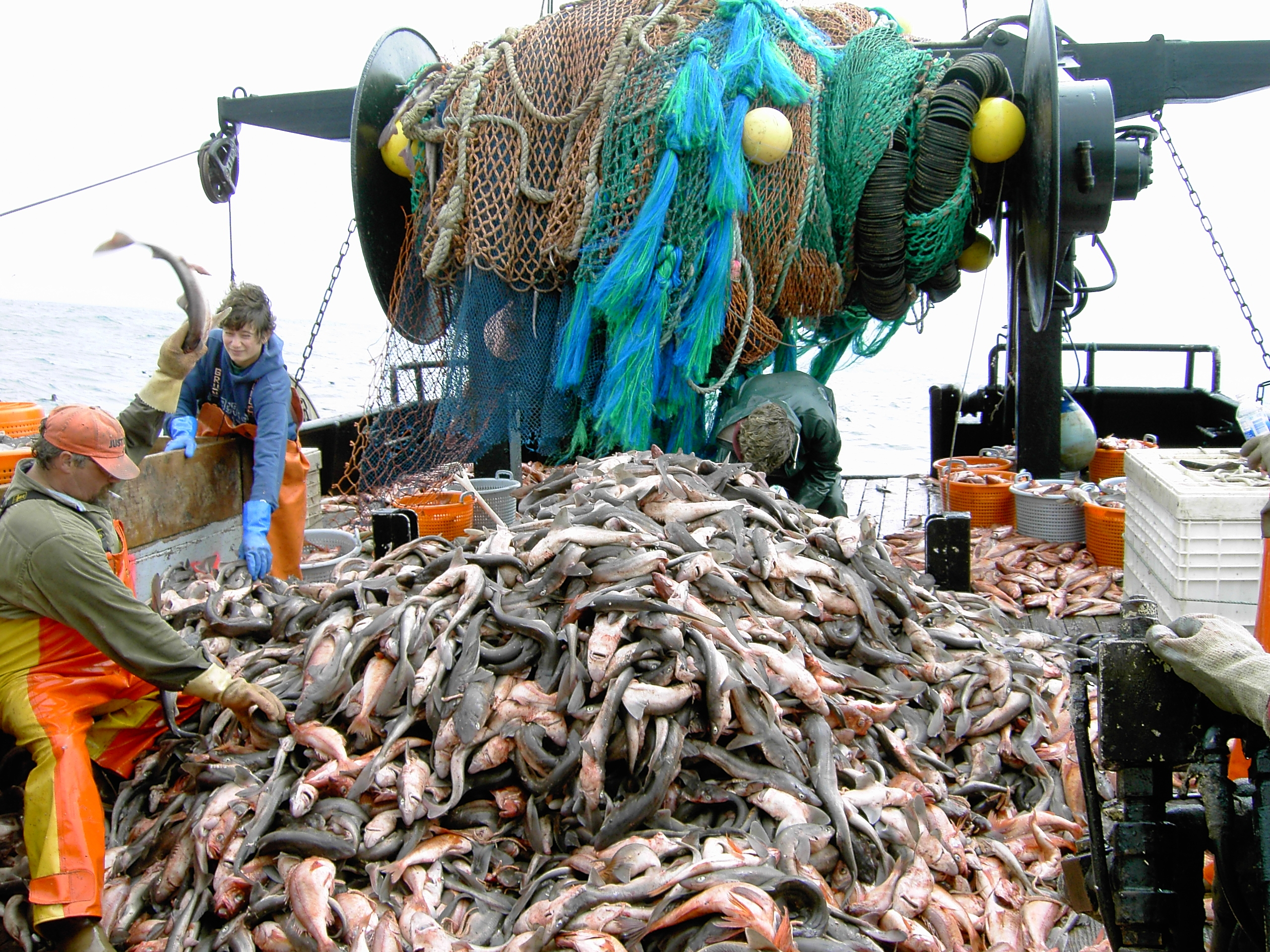
Fish on a trawler's deck

People interact with fish in multiple ways, whether practically, in folklore and religion, or in art. They have economic importance in the fishing industry and fish farming; these industries provide some people with an income, and the general population with fish as food. Other practical uses of fish include recreational fishing and their use in biological research. Fish play symbolic roles in religion, mythology, folklore, and fairy tale, where stories about fish have been told in cultures around the world for thousands of years. Fish have similarly been depicted in art, literature, film, and music in many cultures. Academic study of fish in culture is called ethnoichthyology. Both academically and in practice, all these aspects of fish in people's lives are interrelated.

== Scope ==
Fish provide people with food and recreation, support a wide range of industrial processes, and contribute to human society in many ways such as through health care, jewellery, tools, weapons, items of clothing, and musical instruments. These many uses contribute to people's nutritional and economic security and to social cohesion. In addition, fish contribute important advantages to ecosystems, not least serving as "canaries" indicating the presence of ecological threats, and support sustainable forms of aquaculture. Among traditional peoples, fish both contribute an important part of the diet and economy, and figure in rituals and beliefs. Fishing for food can influence aspects of practical culture including clothing, food culture, and architecture; spiritual aspects including customs, art, faith, and cultural attitudes; and social elements including a people's social system, norms, and the structure of society. There is a two-way interplay between human attitudes, beliefs, and symbols concerning fish, such as in Christianity, and people's practical use of and dependency on fish: "Fish not only guarantee the necessities of human life as food for the world, but they also establish human and fish relationships that link social, cultural, traditional, and religious life to every human being."

== Practical uses ==
=== For food ===
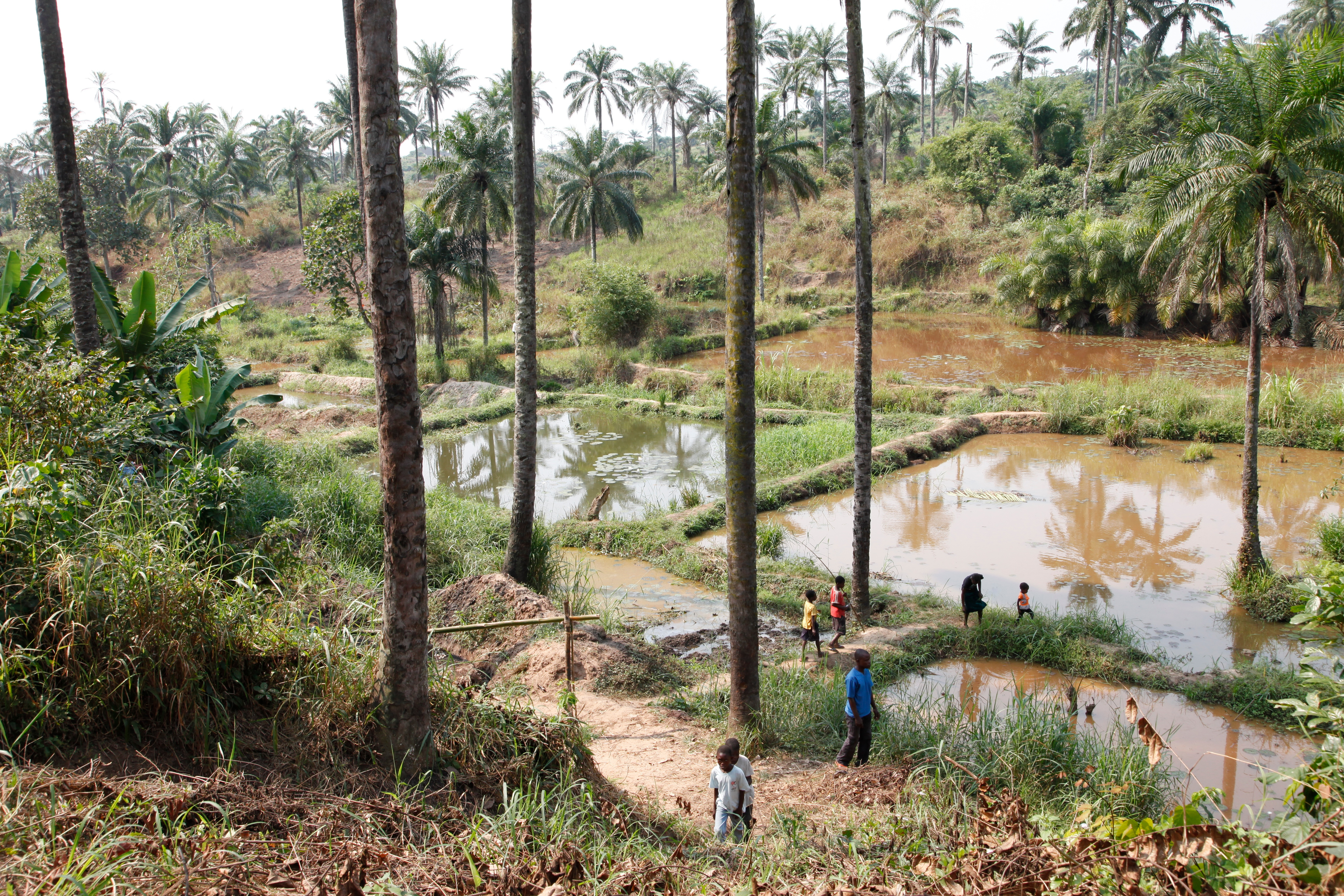
Fish farming ponds in a cooperative village project

Throughout history, humans have utilized fish as a food source. Historically, most fish protein has come by means of catching wild fish. However, fish farming, which has been practiced since about 3,500 BC in China, is becoming increasingly important in many nations, and by 2016, more than 50% of the seafood brought to market was produced by aquaculture (of fish and shellfish). Overall, about one-sixth of the world's protein is estimated to be provided by fish. Fisheries provide income for millions of people.

=== For materials ===
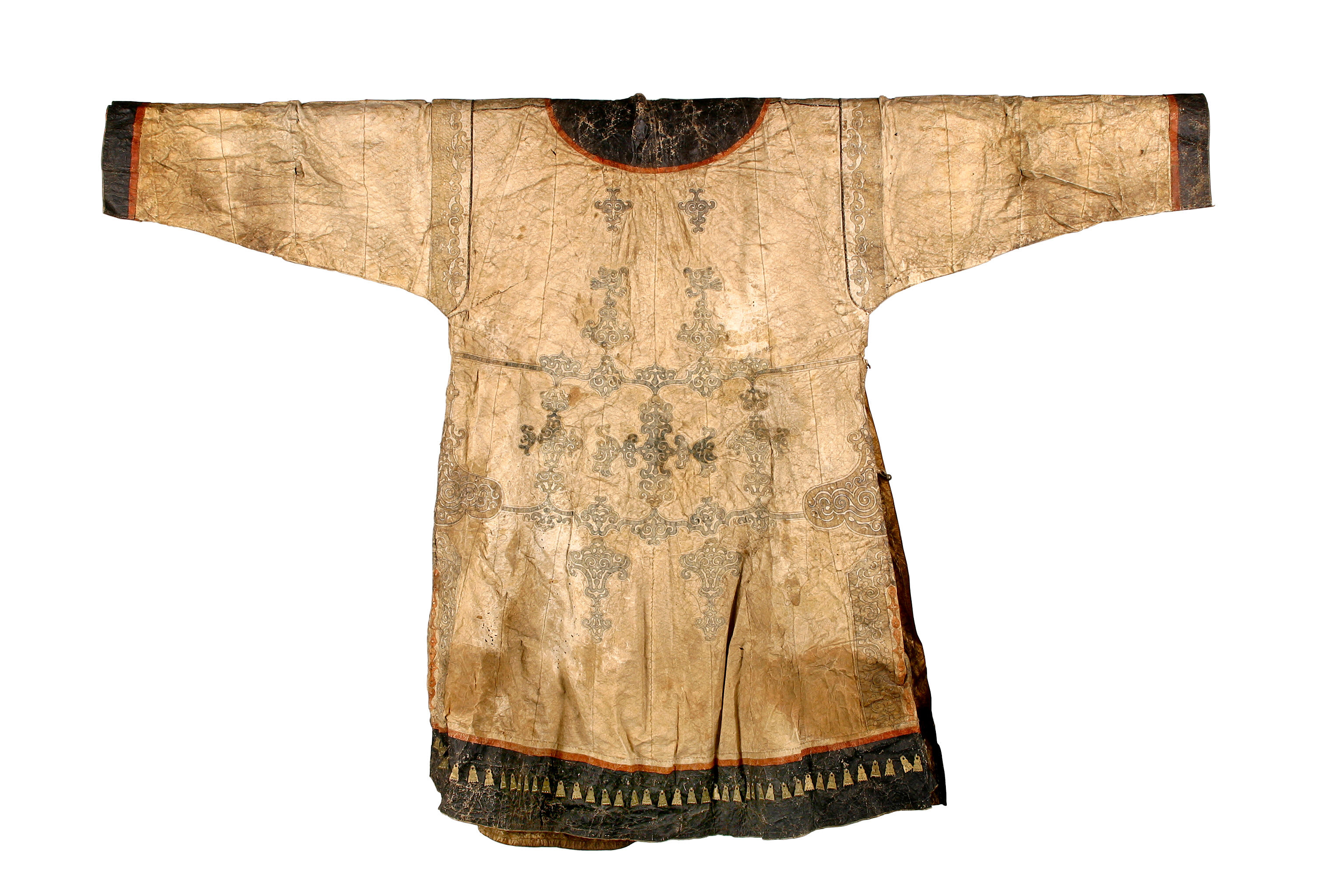
Fish skin robe of the Nivkh people

Fish have been used to provide a wide range of materials other than food, both by indigenous peoples and in modern industrial production. Peoples of the Arctic such as the Nivkh people of Northern Russia have used fish skins to make clothing. Fish bones have been used to bioremediate heavy metals such as lead from contaminated soil. In Tasmania, indigenous people used fishbones as tools to pierce holes in shells, to allow these to be strung and worn as jewellery.

Material uses of fish parts other than as food
Part	Uses
Eye	Jewellery
Tongue	Grater
Teeth	Scissors, weapons
Liver	lubricants
Connective tissue	Aphrodisiacs, biofuel, caulks/sealants, moisturisers
Intestine	Musical instruments
Swim bladder	Fining agents
Milt	Adsorbents
Bone	Glue, skincare, toothpaste
Skin	Burn treatment, abrasives, fashion accessories
Scales	Bioplastics, treating pollutants
Otolith	Jewelry, lucky charms
Whole fish	Curios

=== In recreation ===
Fish have been recognized as a source of beauty for almost as long as used for food, appearing in cave art, being raised as ornamental fish in ponds, and displayed in aquariums in homes, offices, or public settings. Some smaller and more colourful species, and sometimes painted fish, serve as ornamental fish in ponds and aquariums, and as pets.

Angling is fishing for pleasure or competition, with a rod, reel, line, hooks and bait. It has been practised for centuries, providing pleasure and employment.

=== In science ===
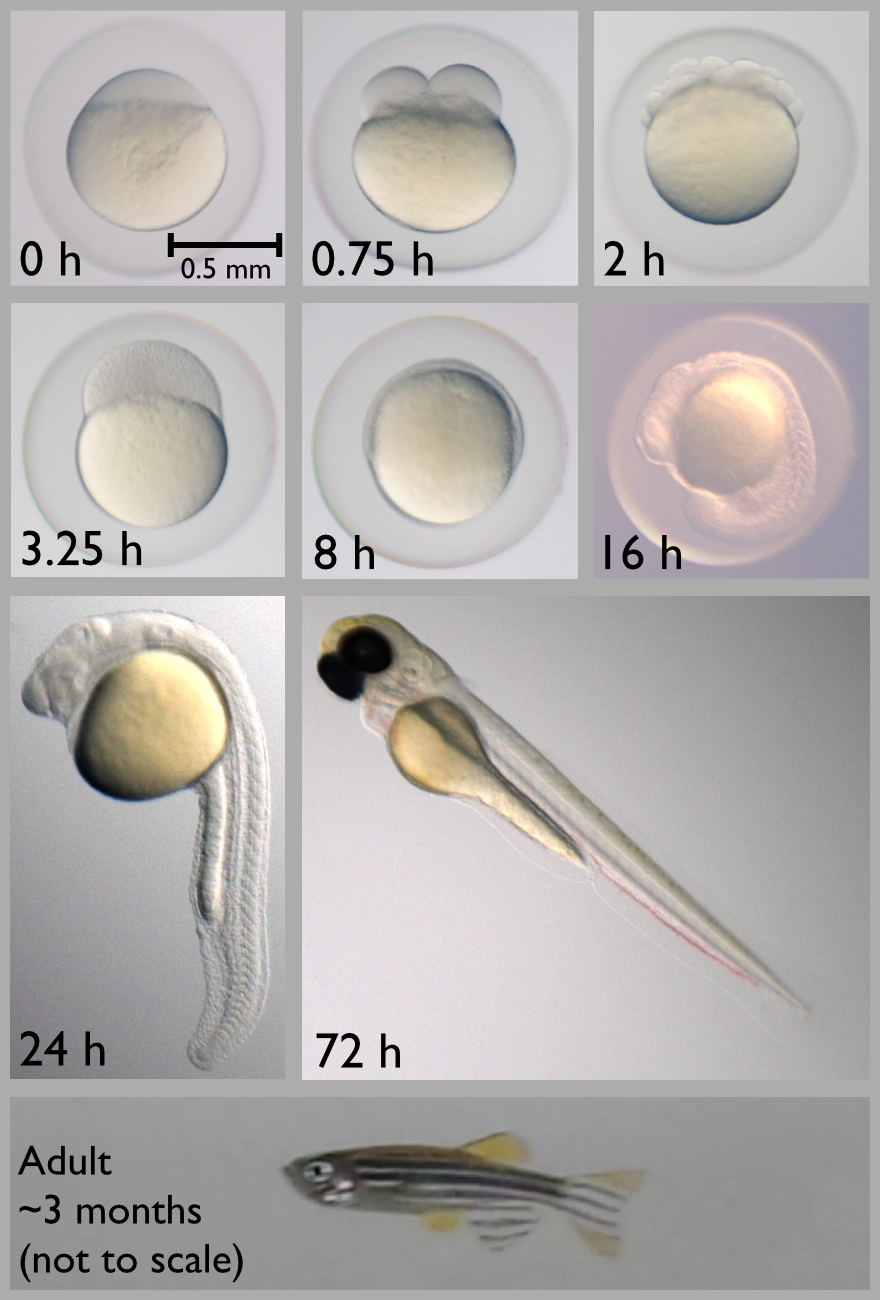
Zebrafish as a model of animal development

Medaka and zebrafish are used as research models for studies in genetics and developmental biology. The zebrafish is the most commonly used laboratory vertebrate, offering the advantages of similar genetics to mammals, small size, simple environmental needs, transparent larvae permitting non-invasive imaging, plentiful offspring, rapid growth, and the ability to absorb mutagens added to their water.

== Religion and folklore ==
=== In religion and mythology ===
Fish have had symbolic significance in culture and religion for thousands of years. In-and-Out Fish Design is a constant theme in prehistoric and historical Persian art, which demonstrates two swinging fishes named Kar-Mahi. Ahura Mazda sets these fishes on guard of roots of the tree of life, named Gukaran, so they are eternal sentries of worldly life, in Persian culture.

In ancient Mesopotamia, fish offerings were made to the gods from the beginnings of human settlement in the area. Fish were also a major symbol of Enki, the god of water. Fish frequently appear as a filling motif on cylinder seals from the Old Babylonian period (c. 1830 BC – c. 1531 BC), usually in close proximity to malevolent forces, such as demons. Neo-Assyrian (911 BC – 609 BC) cylinder seals sometimes show fish resting on tables, which may be altars. The Assyrian King Sennacherib is recorded as having thrown a golden fish into the sea along with another golden object to accompany an offering of a golden boat to Ea (the East Semitic equivalent of Enki). Starting during the Kassite Period (c. 1600 BC – c. 1155 BC), healers and exorcists dressed in ritual garb resembling the bodies of fish. This continued until the early Persian Period (550 BC – 330 BC). During the Seleucid Period (312 BC – 63 BC), the legendary Babylonian culture hero Oannes, described by Berossus, was said to have dressed in the skin of a fish. Fish were sacred to the Syrian goddess Atargatis and, during her festivals, only her priests were permitted to eat them.

The central figure of the Book of Jonah—a work of Jewish literature from the fourth century BCE—is a man named Jonah who is called on by God to serve as a prophet. Jonah refuses, fleeing the city by boat, but this is quickly discovered by the crew after they encounter a supernatural storm. The crew casts Jonah into the sea, where he is swallowed by a giant fish, which vomits Jonah out onto the shore of the land where he was called to be a prophet after three days. The book was later included as part of the Hebrew Bible, or Christian Old Testament, and a version of the story it contains is summarized in Surah 37:139-148 of the Quran. Early Christians used the ichthys, a symbol of a fish, to represent Jesus, though the precise reasons for this are not fully known.

In the dhamma of Buddhism, a pair of golden fish symbolize happiness as they have complete freedom of movement in the water. Among the deities said to take the form of a fish are Ikatere of the Polynesians, the shark-god Kāmohoaliʻi of Hawaiʻi, and Matsya of the Hindus.

The astrological symbol Pisces ('the fishes') is based on a constellation of the same name, visible in the northern hemisphere. There is another fish constellation visible in the southern hemisphere, Piscis Austrinus.

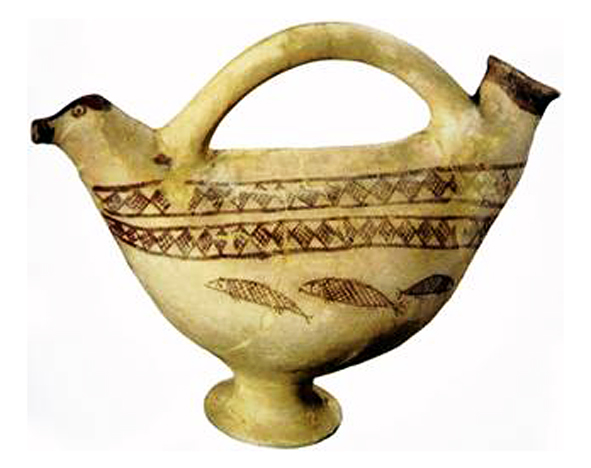
Swinging fishes on a clay pot, Tal-e Bakon, Iran, 4000 BC

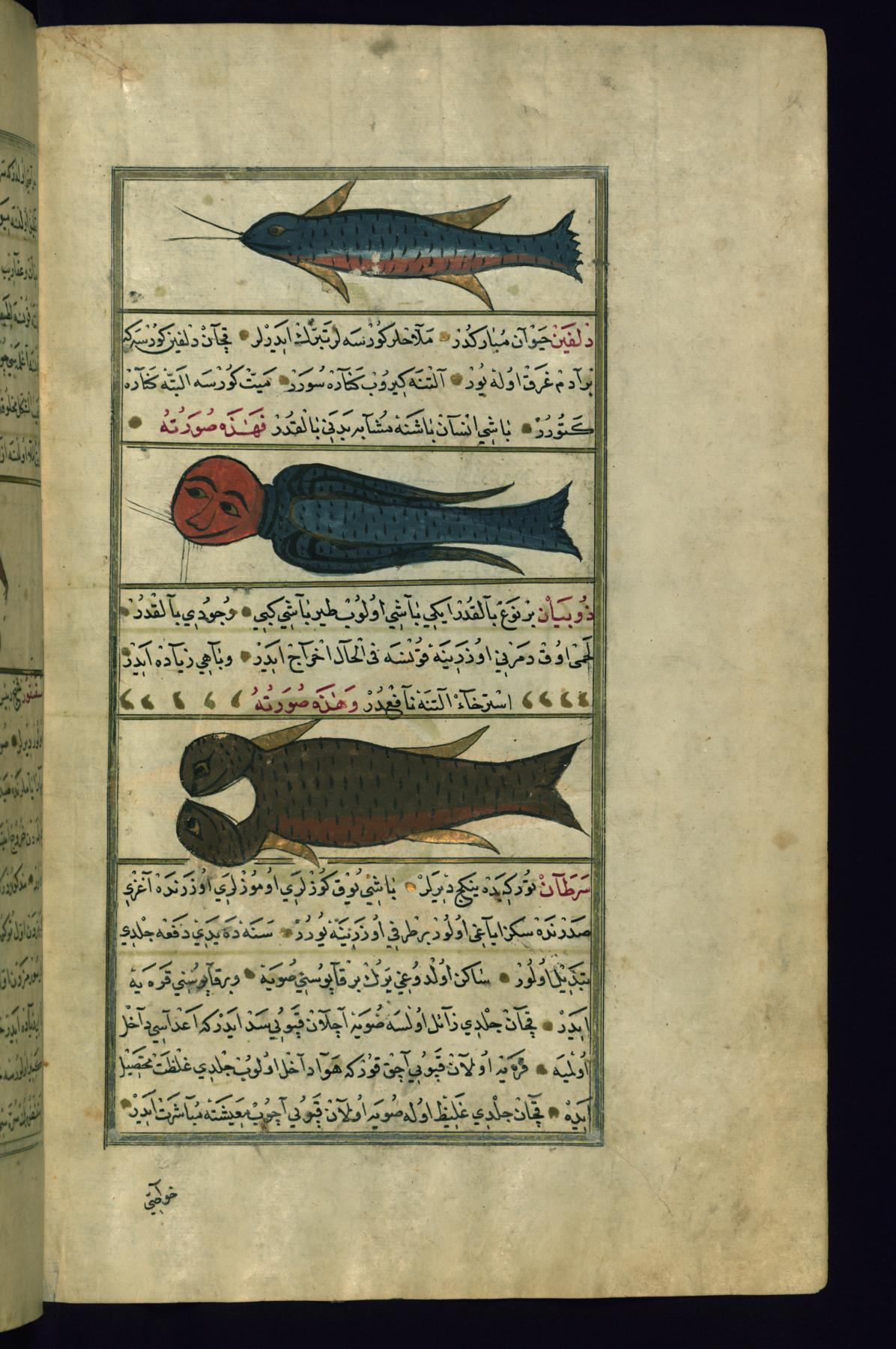
Persian art: 3 fish with different heads, by Ruzmah-'i Nathani

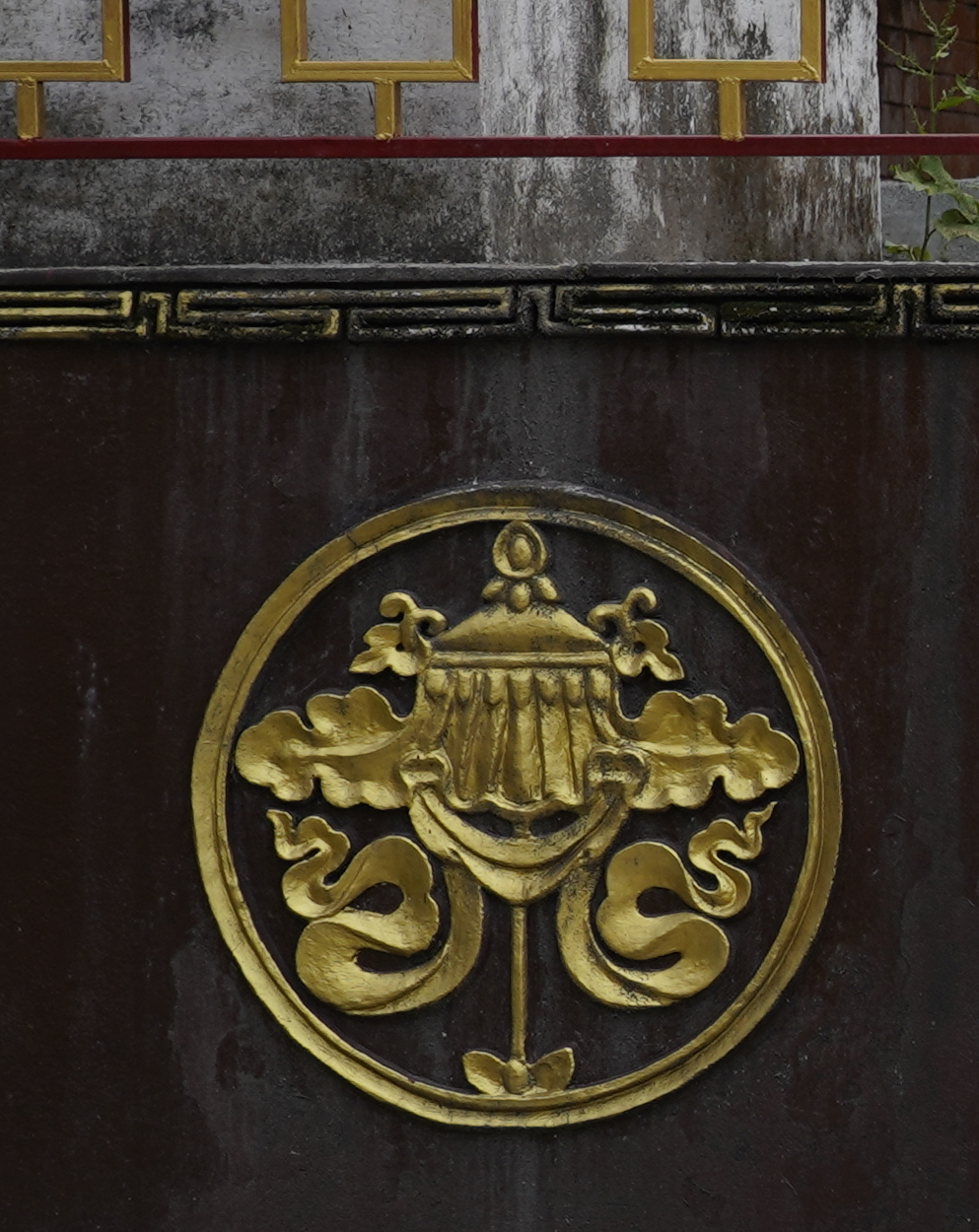
Buddhism's Two Golden Fish, Rhenock Monastery, East Sikkim

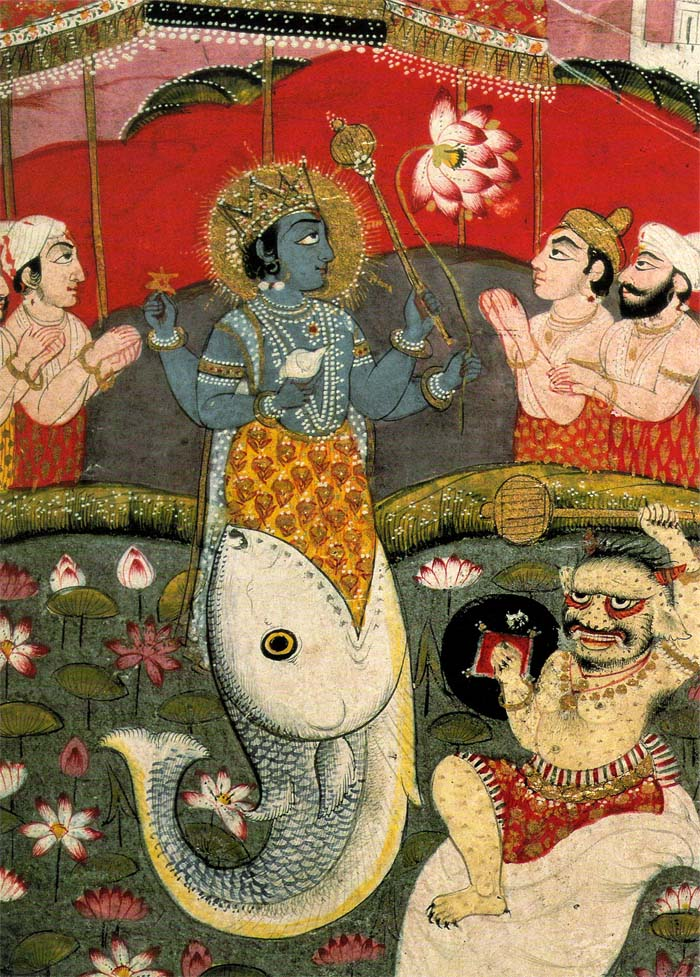
Avatar of Vishnu as a Matsya

The ichthys (fish) is an ancient symbol of Christianity.

=== In folklore and fairy tale ===
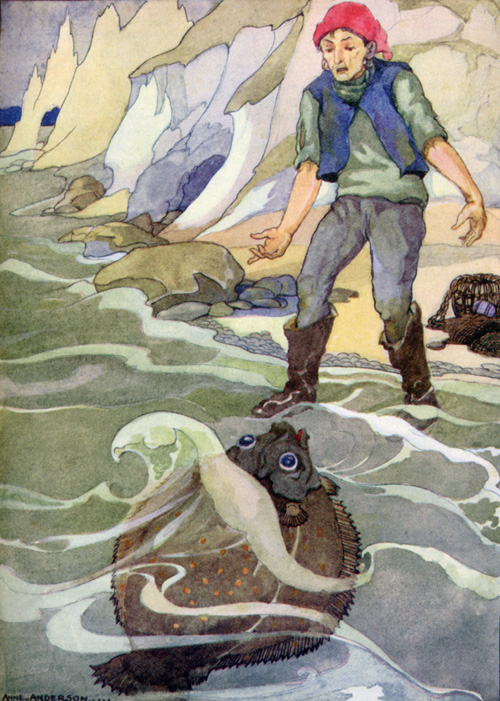
Illustration by Anne Anderson of the fairytale "The Fisherman and His Wife"

Fish with magical abilities appear in fairy and folk tale traditions all over the world. Legends of half-human, half-fish mermaids are common in European folklore, retold in the stories of Hans Christian Andersen. In British folk tales, mermaids both predict and bring ill fortune. The international classification of the Aarne-Thompson-Uther Index includes number 303, "The Twins or Blood Brothers", as in the Spanish fairy tale The Knights of the Fish, and the Albanian heroic tale The Twins. The story runs that a poor fisherman captures a fish three times; on the third occasion, the fish resigns to its fate and convinces the fisherman to cook and give part of its flesh to his wife, his dogs and his horses. Twin boys are born to the fisherman and his wife, two hounds to the dogs and two foals to the horses; in some versions it is triplets. As another example, tale number 507, "The Monster's Bride", varies the theme of Grateful Dead, as in the Armenian fairy tale of The Golden-Headed Fish. The hero (a fisherman's son, a prince) releases a fish back into the ocean. Some time later, he meets a strange companion and together they liberate a princess from a curse. At the end of the tale, the companion reveals he was the fish. Among the numerous other tales are number 554, "The Grateful Animals"; number 555, "The Fisherman and his Wife"; and number 675, "The Fool Whose Wishes Always Come True" or "The Lazy Boy".

== In art ==
=== In film ===
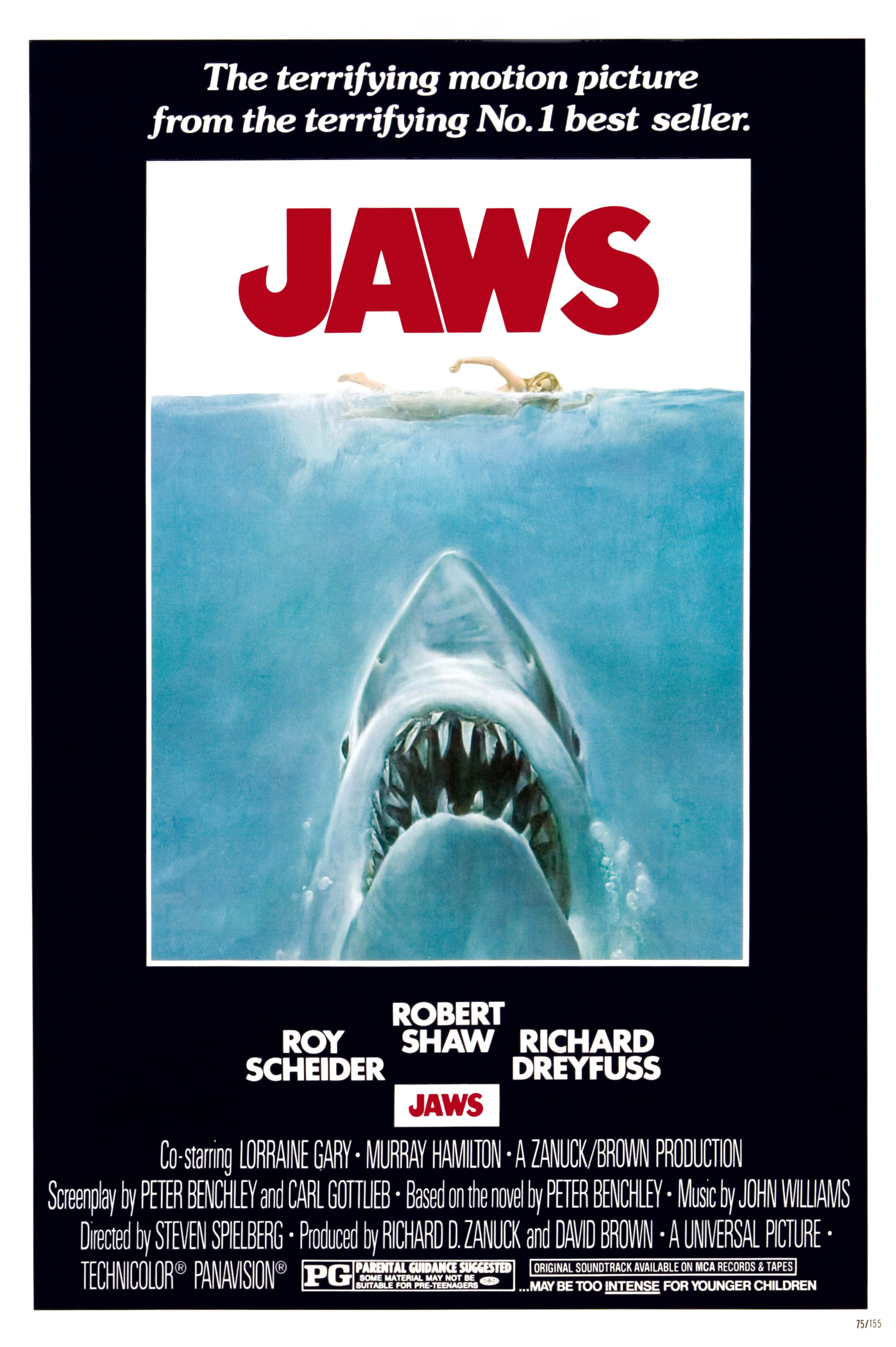
Jaws, the first of several horror films of the same name

Fish feature prominently in film, including both live-action movies like The Incredible Mr. Limpet, and The Old Man and the Sea, as well as animated films like Finding Nemo and The Little Mermaid. Large fish, particularly sharks, have frequently been the subject of horror films and thrillers, most notably the novel Jaws, which spawned a series of films of the same name. Piranha are depicted in a similar light to sharks in films such as Piranha.

Izaak Walton's 1653 book The Compleat Angler celebrates the practice of recreational fishing in prose and verse. The folk singer-songwriter Ewan MacColl's 1960 The Fish Gutters' Song speaks of the "fisher lassies" who travel from Scotland to Yarmouth in Norfolk "tae gut the herrin'" where they can find work. In comic books, characters themed around fish are often portrayed as villains.

=== In paintings ===
Fish have been frequent subjects in art, reflecting their economic importance, for at least 14,000 years. They were commonly worked into patterns in Ancient Egypt, acquiring mythological significance in Ancient Greece and Rome, and from there into Christianity as a religious symbol; artists in China and Japan similarly use fish images symbolically. Fish became common in Renaissance art, with still life paintings reaching a peak of popularity in the Netherlands in the 17th century. In the 20th century, different artists such as Klee, Magritte, Matisse and Picasso used representations of fish to express radically different themes, from attractive to violent. The zoologist and artist Ernst Haeckel painted fish and other animals in his 1904 Kunstformen der Natur. Haeckel had become convinced by Goethe and Alexander von Humboldt that making accurate depictions of unfamiliar natural forms, such as from the deep oceans, he could not only discover "the laws of their origin and evolution but also to press into the secret parts of their beauty by sketching and painting".

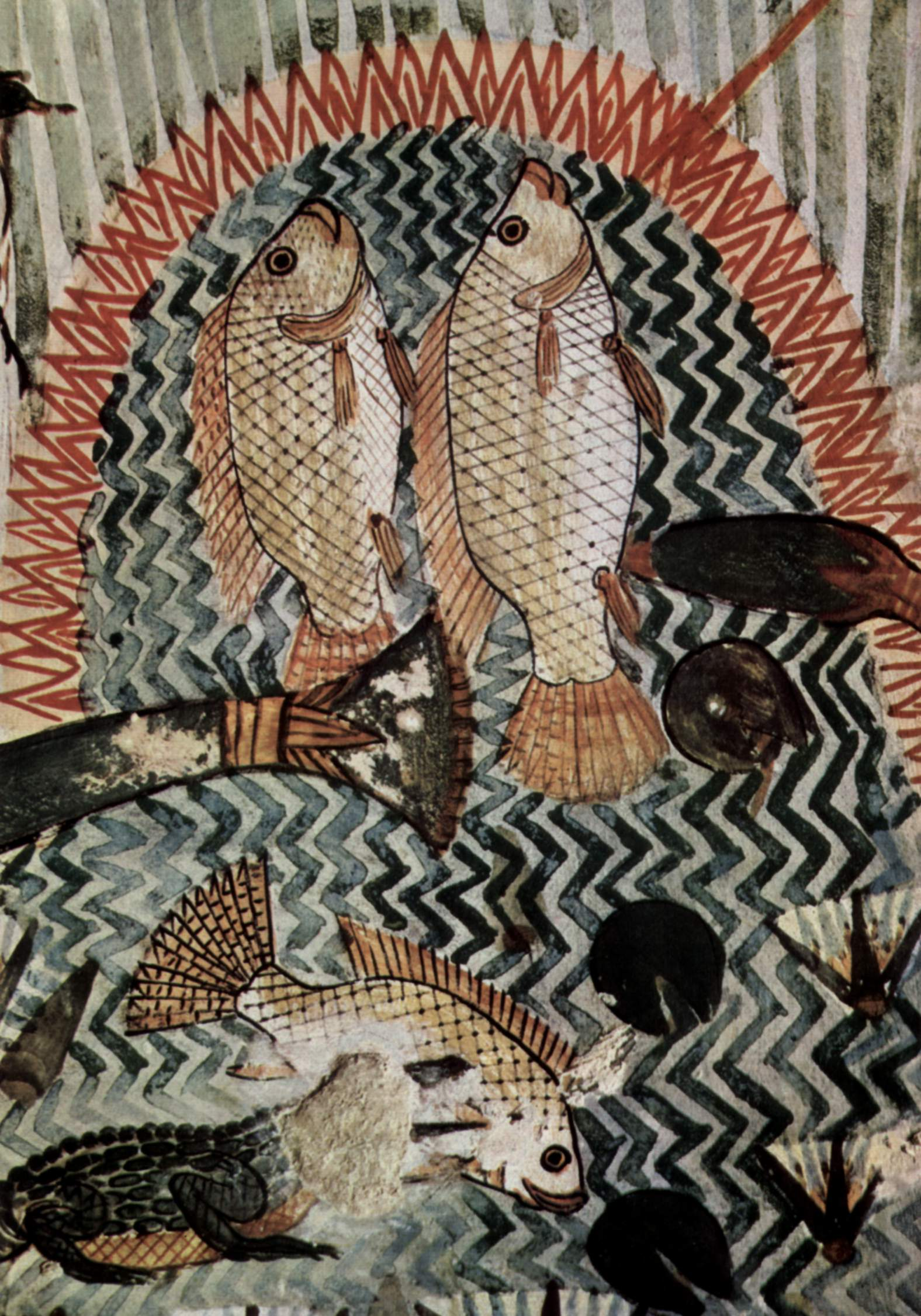
Wall painting of fishing, Tomb of Menna the scribe, Thebes, Ancient Egypt, c. 1422–1411 BC

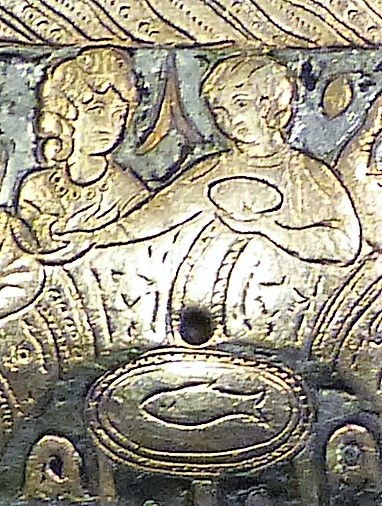
Silver fish plate, Sevso Treasure, Hungary, 4th–5th century

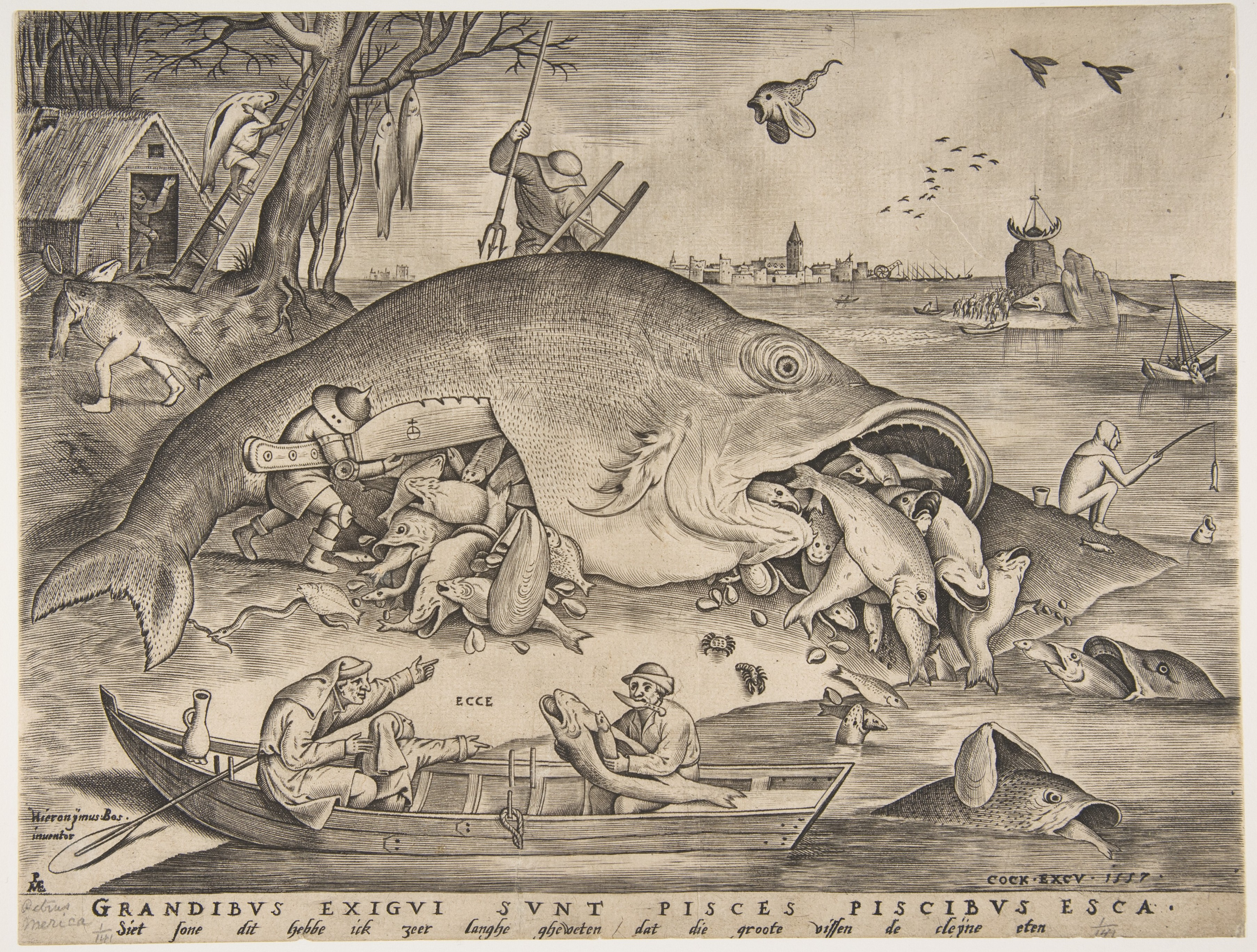
Big Fish Eat Little Fish, Pieter Breughel the Elder, 1557

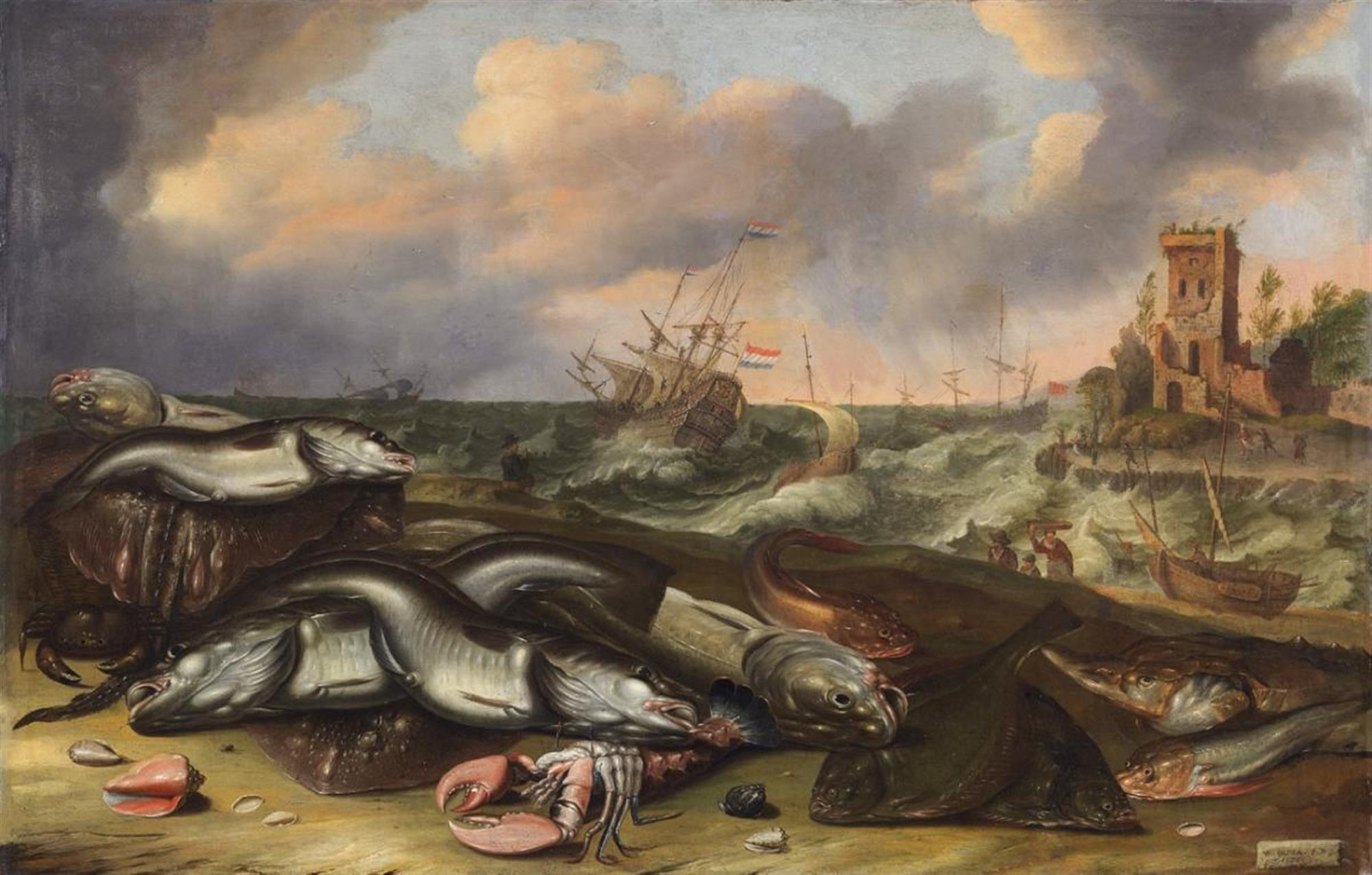
Fish Still Life with Stormy Seas, Willem Ormea and Abraham Willaerts, Dutch Golden Age, 1636

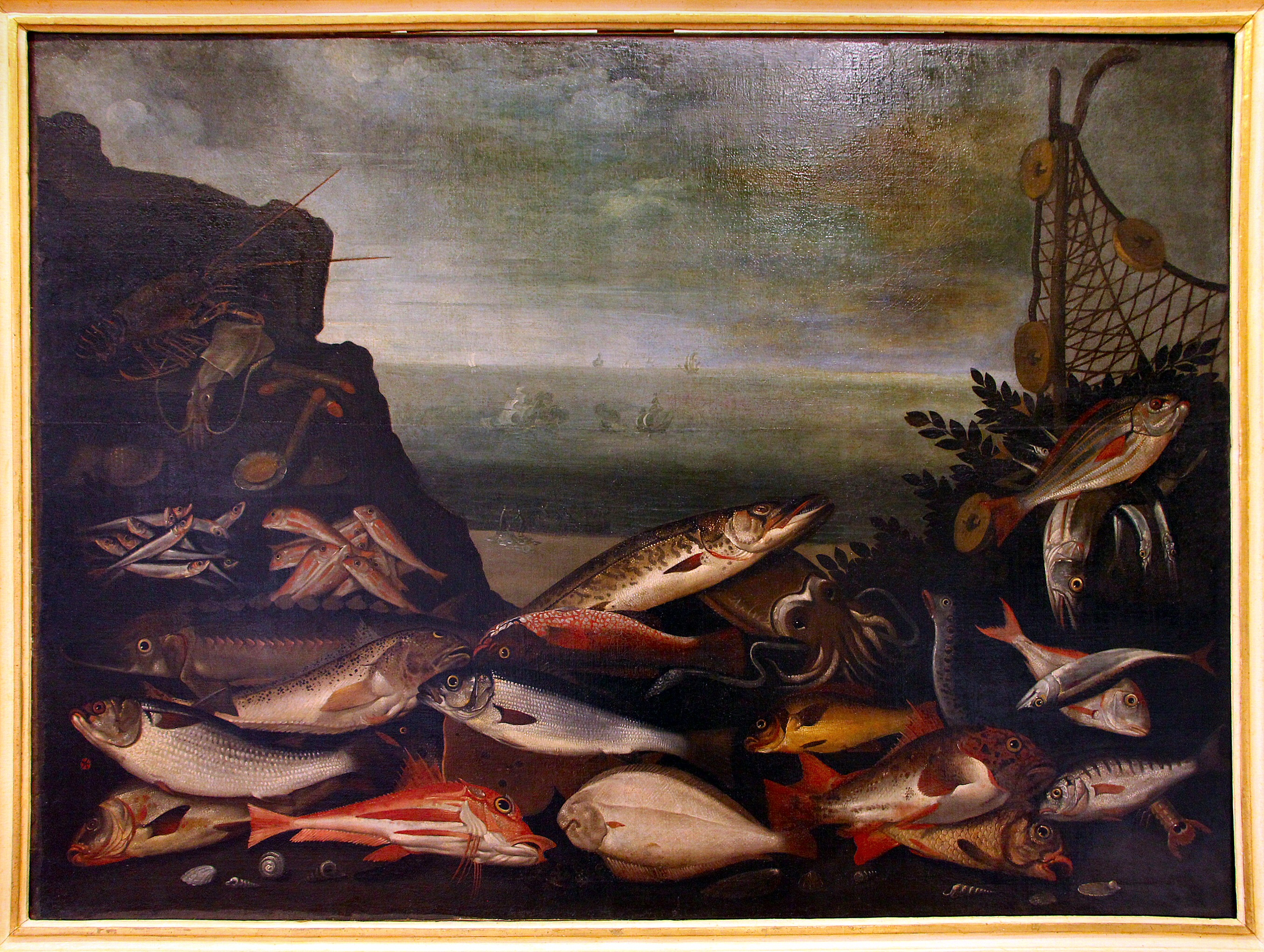
Italian Renaissance: Fish, Antonio Tanari, c. 1610–1630, in the Medici Villa, Poggio a Caiano

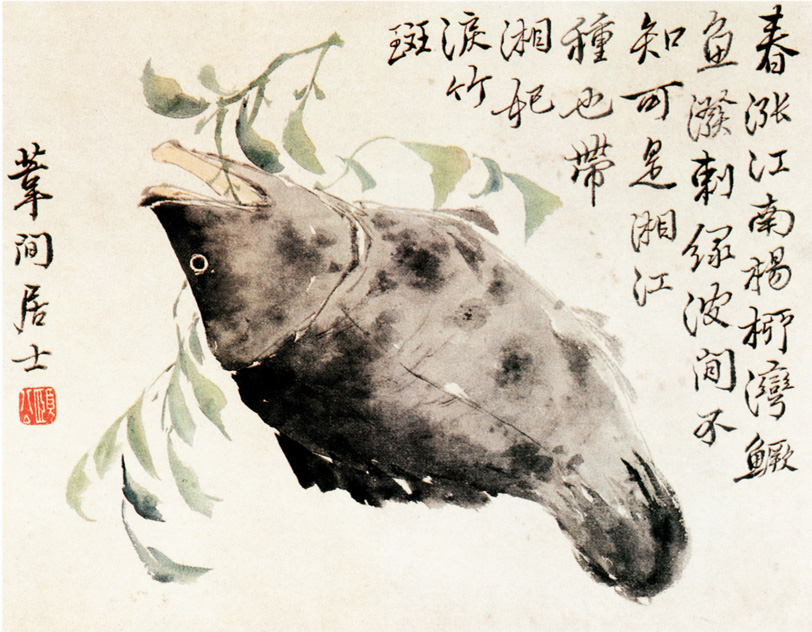
Mandarin Fish by Bian Shoumin, Qing Dynasty, 18th century

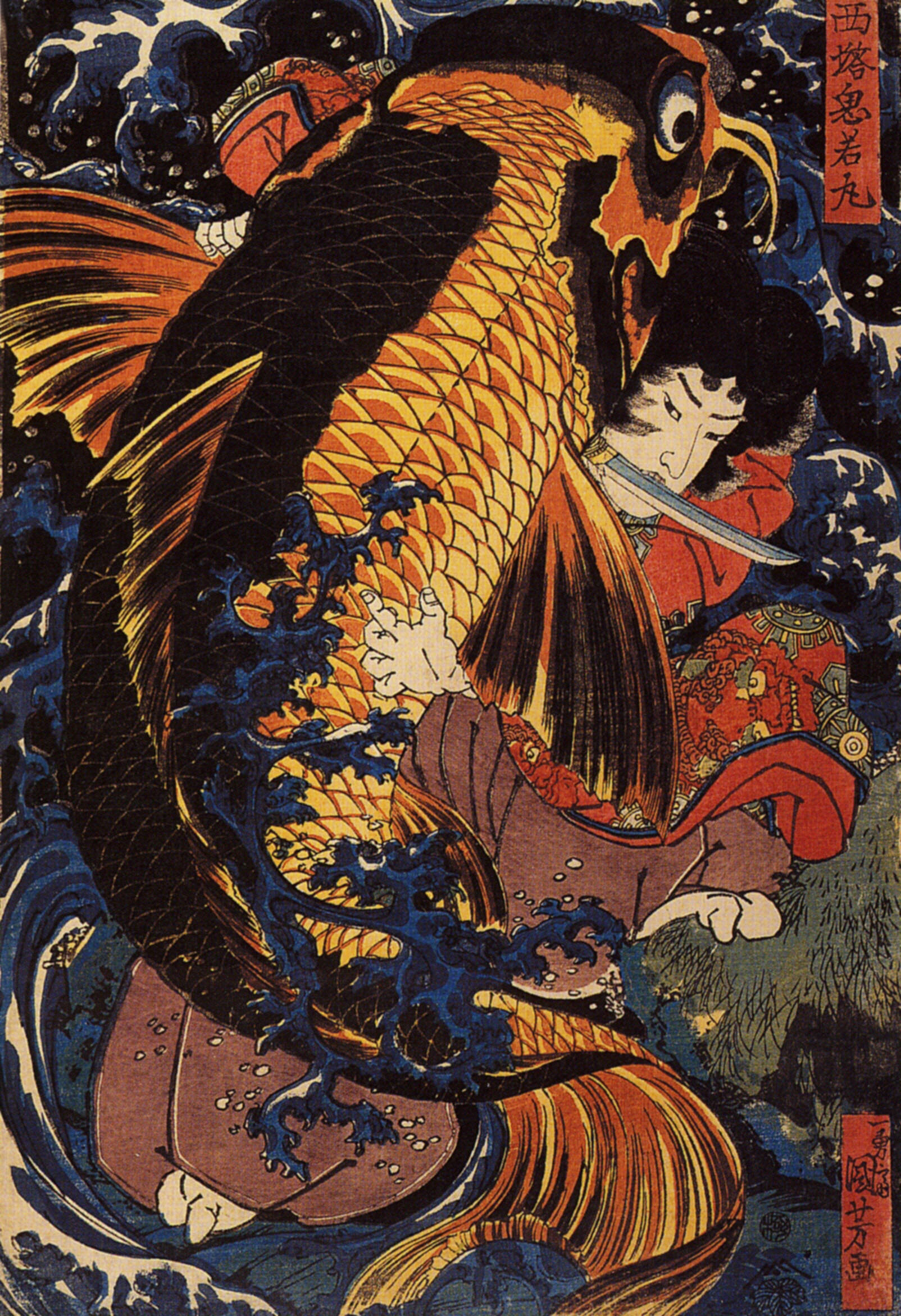
Saito Oniwakamaru fights a giant carp at the Bishimon waterfall by Utagawa Kuniyoshi, 19th century

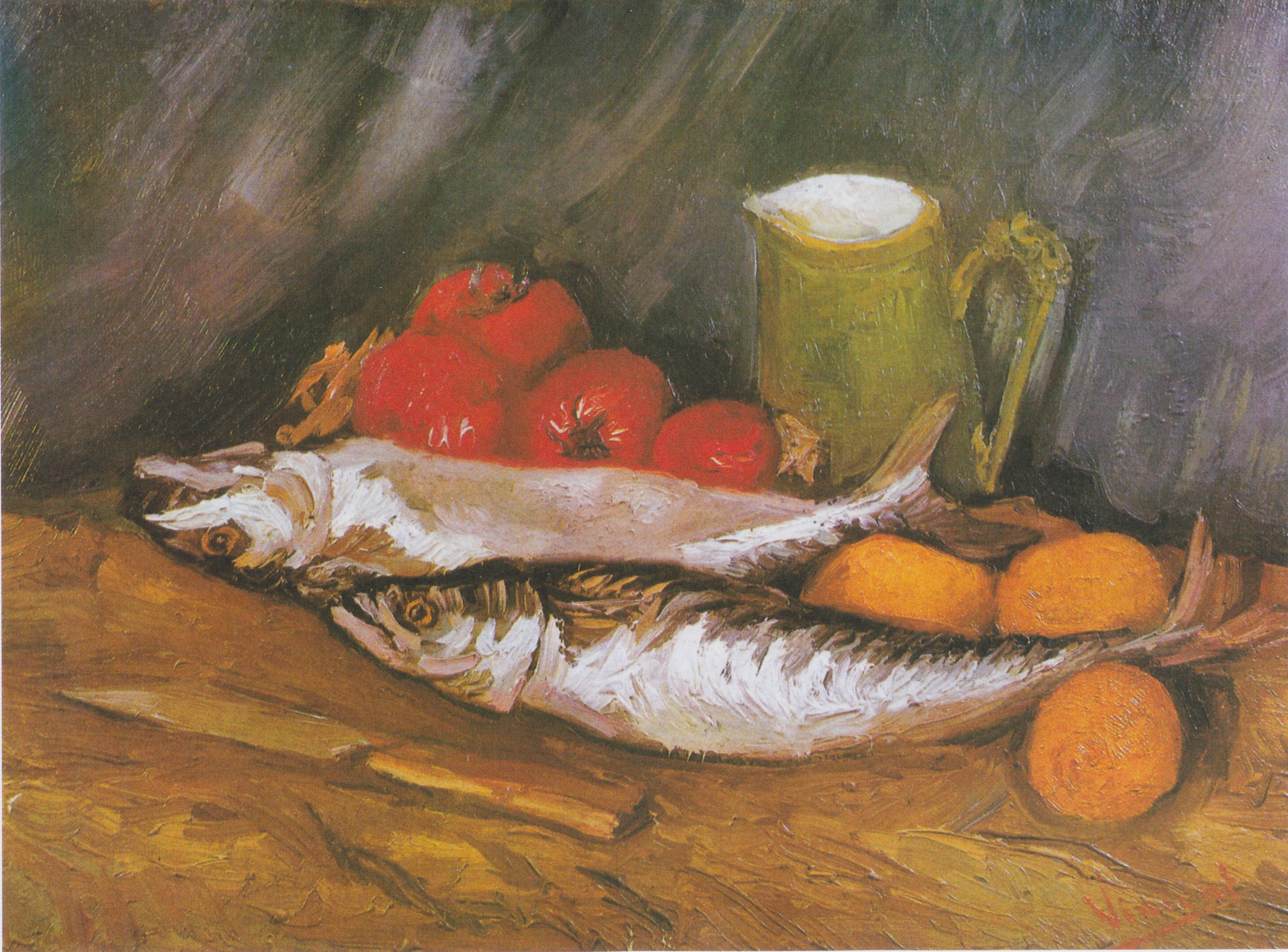
Still Life with Mackerel, Lemons and Tomato, Vincent van Gogh, 1886

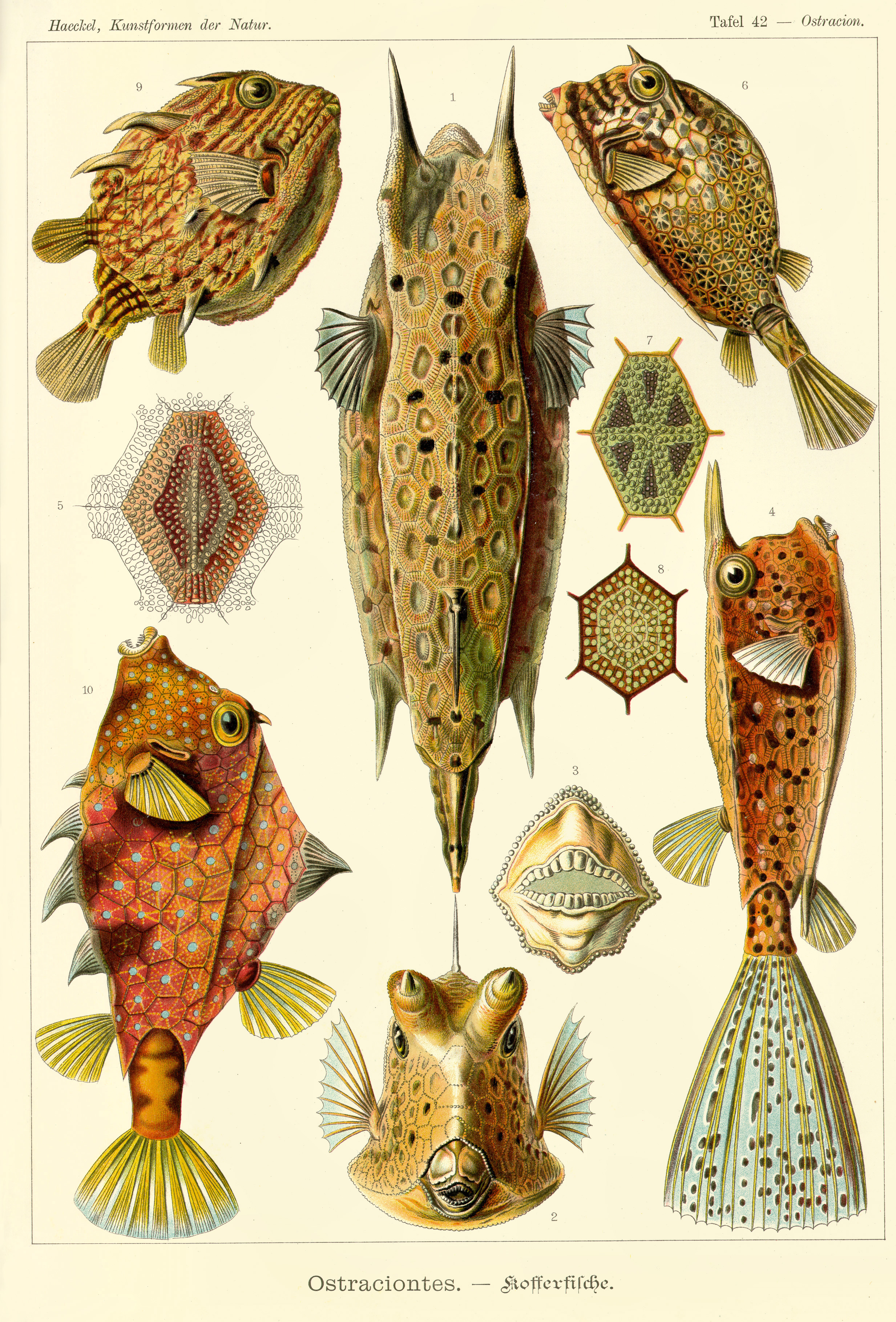
"Ostraciontes" by Ernst Haeckel, 1904. Ten fish with Lactoria cornuta in centre.

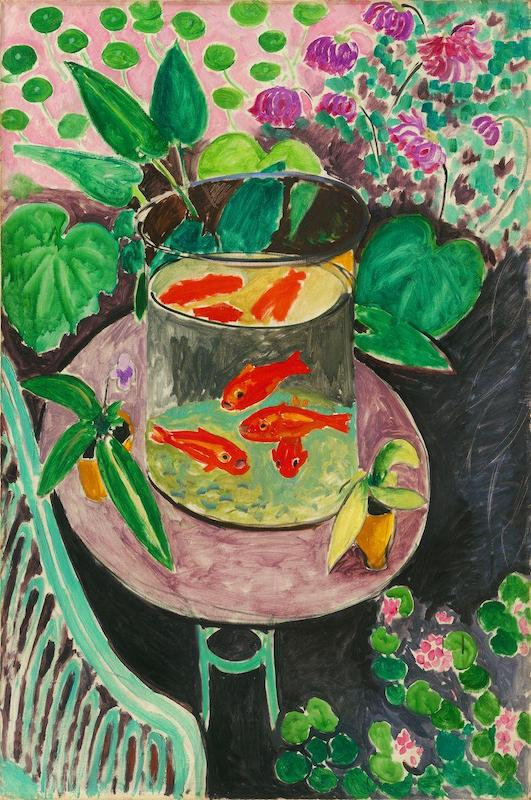
Goldfish, Henri Matisse, 1912

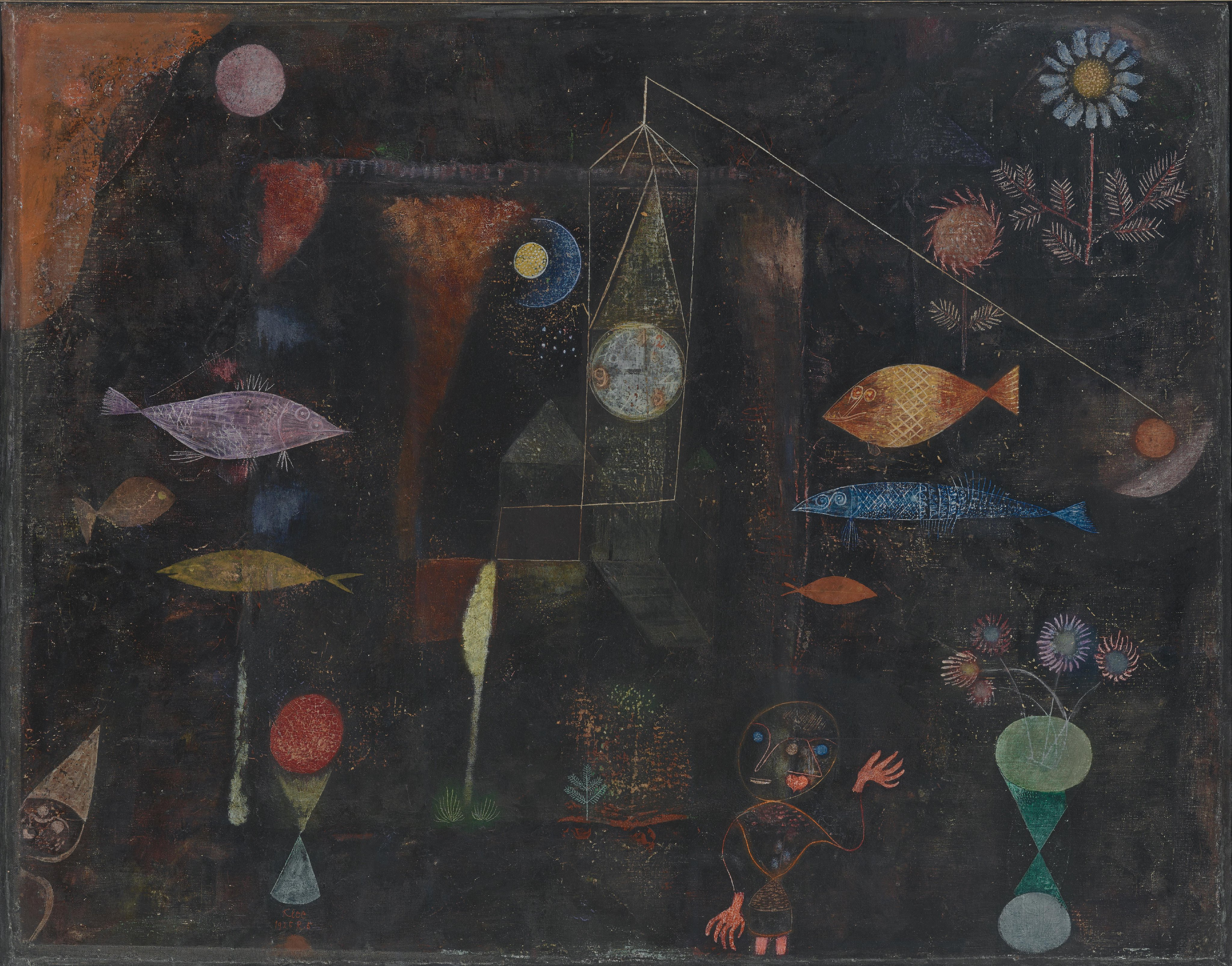
Fish Magic, Paul Klee, oil and watercolour varnished, 1925

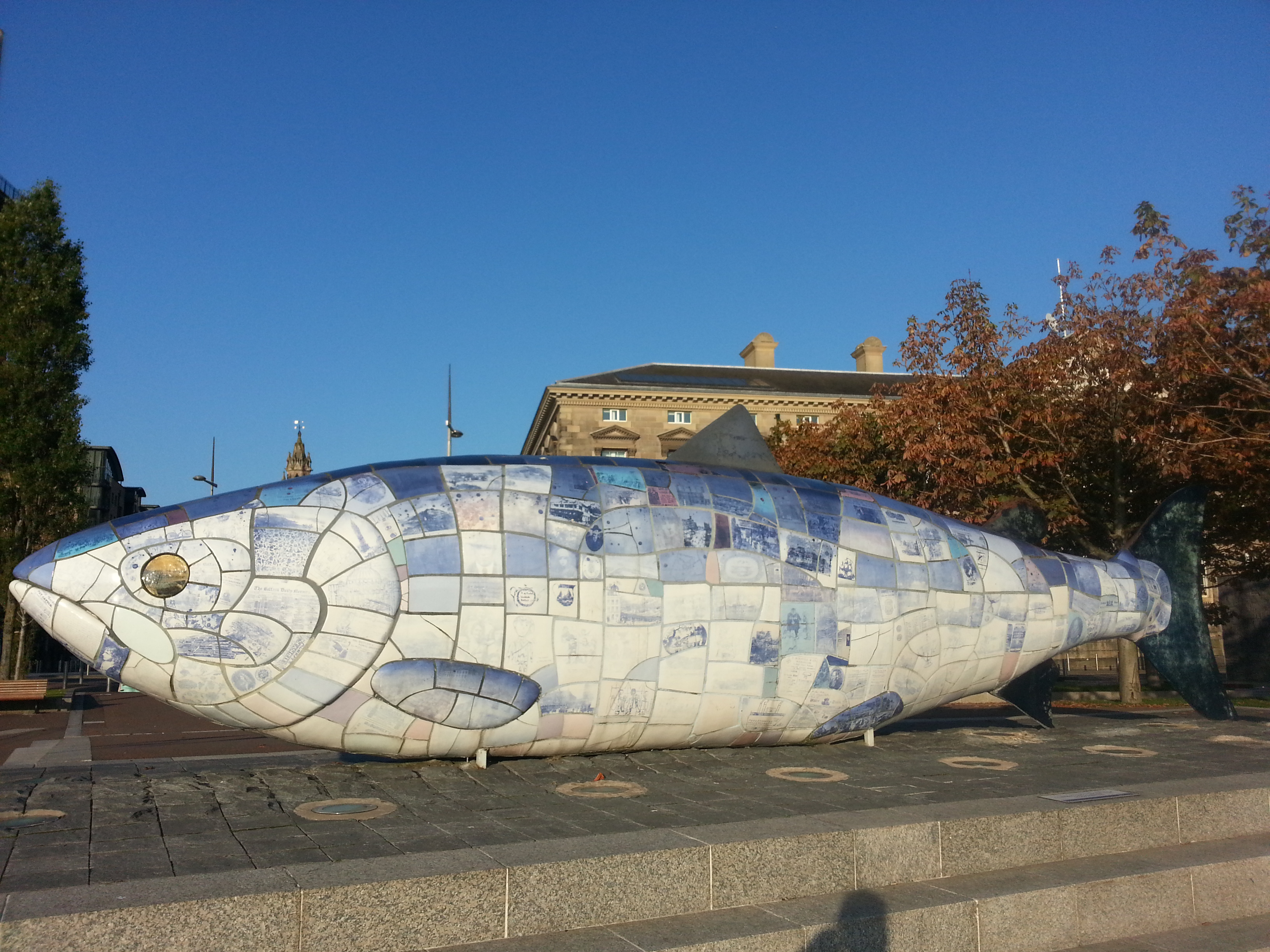
The Big Fish, Belfast, 2014

=== In music ===
Fish have been depicted in classical music in works such as Franz Schubert's Trout Quintet, composed in 1819. The piece formed the basis of Christopher Nupen's 1969 film The Trout, in which Itzhak Perlman, Pinchas Zukerman, Jacqueline du Pré, Daniel Barenboim and Zubin Mehta perform the quintet at the Queen Elizabeth Hall in London.

Fish are the subjects of many popular songs and folksongs. The Scottish "(Wha'll Buy My) Caller Herrin'" sings of the dangers of a fisherman's life, while the nursery rhyme "Once I Caught a Fish Alive" is a counting song for small children. J. R. R. Tolkien gives the monster Gollum a riddling song about fish; it appears in different versions in his fantasy works The Hobbit ("Alive without breath/As cold as death") and The Lord of the Rings ("The cold hard lands/They bites our hands").

== Academic study ==
Academic study of fish in culture is called ethnoichthyology. It is an interdisciplinary field that examines human knowledge of fish, the uses of fish, and the importance of fish in different human societies. It draws on knowledge from many different areas including ichthyology, economics, oceanography, and marine botany. The term ethnoichthyology was in use as early as 1967 when it appeared in a paper by W.T. Morrill.

== See also ==
- Human uses of animals
- Human uses of birds
- Human interactions with insects
- Human uses of plants
