= Tendong Gumpa =

Monastery in Sikkim, India

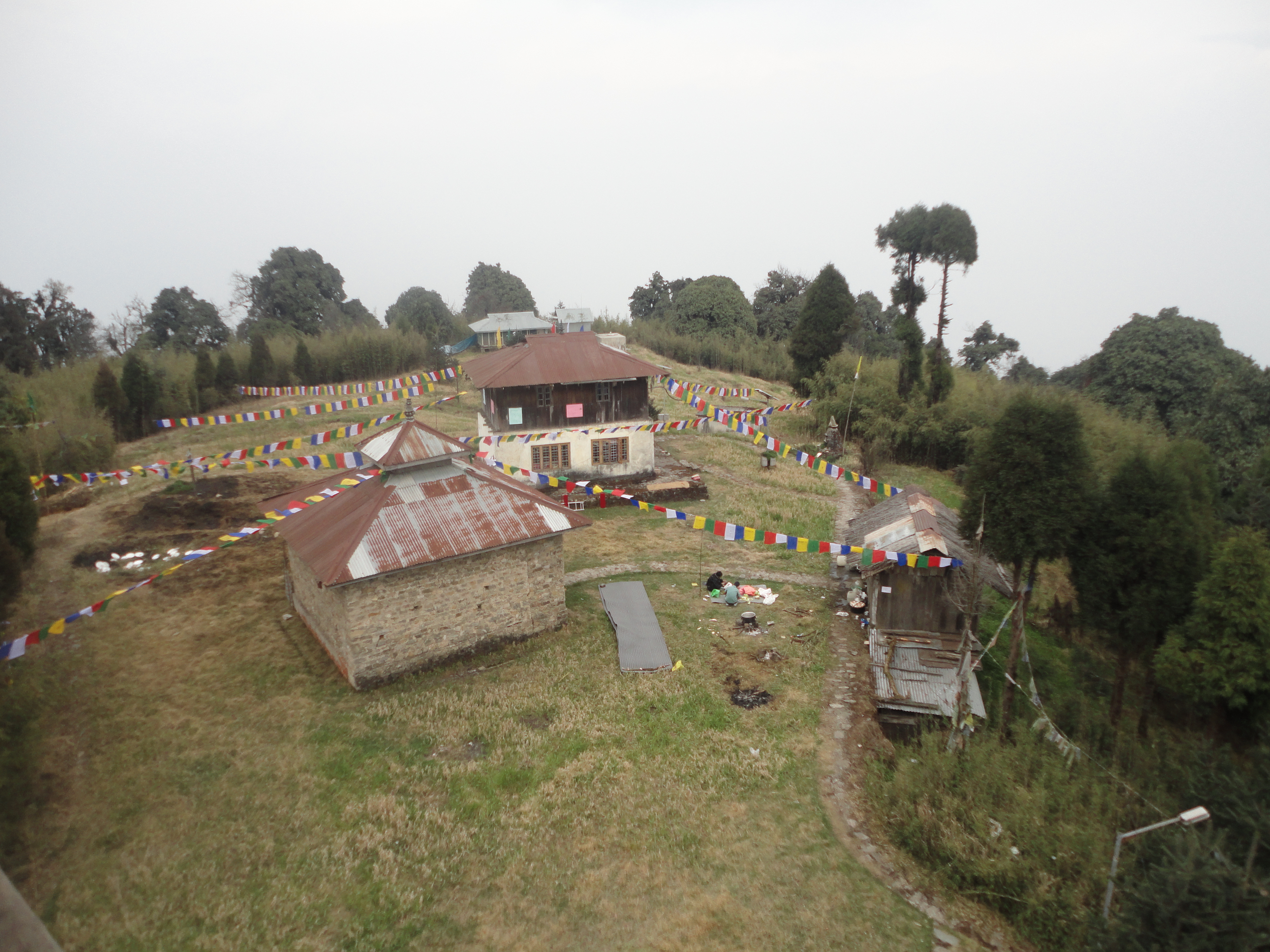

- Location within Sikkim

Religion
- Affiliation: Tibetan Buddhism
- Sect: Nyingma
- Festivals: Buddha Poornima, Tshechu

Location
- Location: Tendong Peak, South Sikkim, India
- Country: India
- Interactive map of Tendong Gumpa
- Coordinates: 27°12′22″N 88°24′29″E

Architecture
- Style: Tibetan architecture
- Founder: Gomchen Pema Chewang Tamang
- Established: 1955
- Also known as TENDONG DICHHEN SALHUN GUMPA

Tendong Dichhen Salhun Gumpa or Tendong Gumpa as commonly known, is a Buddhist monastery situated atop 8530 ft. altitude from mean sea level (msl). This monastery is surrounded by lush green virgin reserve forest and nearest hamlet is Damthang which is at a six kilometer walking distance. Because of its seclusion, there are no resident monks/nuns in this monastery.

Gomchen Pema Chewang Tamang from Boomtar, Namchi, South Sikkim, was the main founder and head lama of Tendong Dichhen Salhun Gumpa. He did his spiritual studies in Tibet and acquired the title of ‘Gomchen’, (the great meditator) from an eminent Rempoche Yongzi Dangi Wongpo of Namdrolling Gumpa. In Tibet, one of his classmates happened to be Maharani Kunshang Dechen wife of Maharaja Sir Tashi Namgyal of Sikkim. Being a brilliant student, he had a cordial relation with the Maharani. Maharaja & Maharani later extended great help in building the monastery. He was also one of the Twenty-Four founding members of the world-famous Namgyal Institute of Tibetology, Deorali, Gangtok. He possessed a multi-talented personality, yet calm, gentle and simple, spent most of his time meditating in loneliness and sometimes helping the society of all spheres in their spiritual needs.

A small holy cave is also present where Sangey Lama Ghesela, founder of Aahley Dichhen Cholling Gumpa had meditated for 6 months. Tendong Peak also houses Tendong Lho Rumfaat of Lepcha community.

There is an approx. 50 ft. tall tower under Sikkim Tourism Department from where one can have a 360 degree scenic view of the mountain range and also offers a good view of majestic Kanchenjunga range. On a clear morning, one can view a beautiful sunrise too.

== History ==
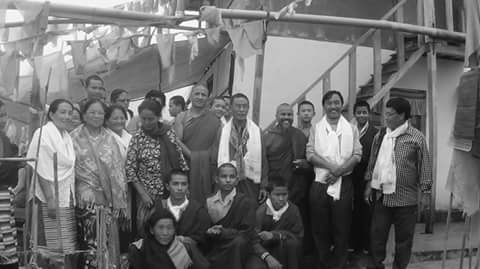
Tendong Gumpa- During Nyungene 2014

Since long before 1930, the peak was meant for chamkhang (meditation). At this period, Khempo Yongda Vajra of Tibet, Guru of the founder of this gumpa had meditated here. The stone chortens or stupas were built sometime during 1951-52 by the devotees and the lamas. Present gumpa was built in the year 1955 with the support of the then King & Queen of Sikkim and with the help of then EC Kazi Densapa Sahab of Bermiok. An honoured lama guru Sangey Lama Ghesela, founder of Aahley Dichhen Cholling gumpa, one of the prominent gumpas in Namchi, had also meditated here for 3 years and in the nearby cave for 6 months. In recent years, renown Nyungney Guru lama Lhakpa Bomzon had also completed his three years three months retreat (Cham) alone at this hill-top during October 1998. To this day, Tendong hilltop has been the abode of spiritual gurus and other seeking seclusion for meditation.

In the 2011 Sikkim earthquake, this monastery was also partially damaged and renovations were immediately done with the aid received from Sikkim Government.

== Infrastructure ==
There are two shrines, a two-story building comprising Gurulakhang (main monastery) and a small library which has recently been inaugurated. Second is manilakhang where exclusively Cherenzig is worshipped & mani prayer is done. One mani-khorlo is also kept in it. One structure outside these monasteries serve the purpose of a store & a meditation hut. There is a two-room hut for the stay. There is a 50 ft. tall tower from where one can have a 360 degree scenic view of the mountain range and of the majestic Kanchenjunga range. On a clear morning, one can view a beautiful sunrise also.

A library was first set up in the monastery for imparting knowledge of Buddhism to the general public. It was inaugurated by spiritually dedicated daughter Roshmi Theengh, and a ritual ceremony was performed by Khempo Dzogchen Lama. The library initially started with 50-60 titles on various topics of Buddhism. It is presently in expansion phase.

== Festivals ==
During March–April, on the tenth day of the Tibetan lunar calendar i.e. on Tshechu, local people used to come to the monastery to pay their respect and gratitude to the head lama for offering prayers for their good health and good harvest. Now-a-days it has become a sort of tradition to young people to come on this day in thousands to offer prayers and to some for trekking etc. This day coincides with the Rama Navami festival for which there is a government holiday in Sikkim.

== Location ==
Nearest hamlet is Damthang which is 6 km from Tendong Gumpa and is well connected to rest of Sikkim. Taxis and Sikkim Nationalised Transport buses run from Namchi, Gangtok and Ravangla to Damthang. Damthang Tendong Gumpa is accessible only by foot. An alternative route to reach Tendong Gumpa is from Perbing (7 km away).

Nearest Airport is Bagdogra Airport (118 km) and nearest railhead is New Jalpaiguri Railway Station (113 km).

== Flora and fauna ==
Tendong area is rich in flora and fauna and is a part of proposed State biodiversity park, Tendong.

Barking Deer, Flying Squirrels, bear, wild boar and a variety of lesser mammals inhabit this rich area. The avifauna diversity is also very rich.

Flora include rhododendron arboreum, Rhododendron griffithianum, magnolia, Oak, Gobre Salla (Abies webbiana), Buk Bajarath (Quercus lamellosa), Phalant (Quercus thomsoniana), Bante (Quercus pachyphylla).
