= Gomchen Pema Chewang Tamang =

Tibetan Buddhist scholar

Lama Pema Chewang Gomchen

Personal life
- Born: Ratnaman Tamang; 1918 (Year of Horse) Boomtar, Namchi, South Sikkim, Kingdom of Sikkim
- Died: 13 March 1966 Boomtar, Namchi, South Sikkim, Kingdom of Sikkim
- Resting place: Alley Dichae Choling Gumpa, Namchi, South Sikkim, India
- Notable work(s): Founder- Tendong Gumpa, Co-Founder member of Namgyal Institute of Tibetology

Religious life
- Religion: Buddhism
- Institute: Namdroling Gumpa, Kharag, Tibet
- School: Tibetan
- Sect: Nyingma
- Dharma name: Péma Chewang
- Initiation: Karma Choye Kyab (Father's brother)

Senior posting
- Teacher: Khempo Vangda Vajra, Lama Zerap Zanjapo

Gomchen Pema Chewang Tamang (1918 – 13 March 1966) was a Tibetan Buddhist scholar, teacher and a renounced practitioner.

Born in Boomtar, Namchi, South Sikkim of erstwhile Sikkim Princely State, he was the main founder and head lama of Tendong Dichhen Salhun Gumpa. He did his spiritual studies in Tibet and acquired the title of ‘Gomchen’ (the great meditator) from an eminent Rimpoche Yongzi Dangi Wongpo of Namdroling Gumpa of Tibet. In the monastery, one of his classmates was Maharani Kunzang Dechen, wife of Maharaja Sir Tashi Namgyal of Sikkim. Being a brilliant student and from her own kingdom, she had a cordial relation with Gomchen Pema Chewang Lama. Maharaja & Maharani later extended great help in building the monastery. He was also one among the twenty-four founder members of the Namgyal Institute of Tibetology situated at Deorali, Gangtok. He spent most of his time meditating in loneliness and sometimes helping society in their spiritual needs.

== Early life ==
Born to a farmer family, he was the son of Sri. Nardhoj Yonzon Tamang and Chandramati Tamang. He had 2 siblings, a brother and a sister. Born to humble family and due to lack of conventional educational institutions in hometown, he was sent to his paternal uncle Lama Karma Choye Kyab who ordained him at the age of 7 the monastic name Pema Chewang was given. Later at the age of 12 he was put under the guidance of Guru, Khempo Yongda Vajra at the age of 12 in Tendong Gumopa to receive higher education on Buddhism. Later he has received his further education from Nepal and Tibet.

== Death ==
His body was cremated in Alley Dichae Choling Gumpa in Namchi. The then King of Sikkim, Palden Thondup Namgyal attended the final rites at Palace Gumpa, Gangtok, conducted by the head lama of the most prominent Nyingma monastery in Sikkim, Pemayangtse monastery. at the behest of renounced Namgyal Institute of Tibetology.
