= Sang Monastery =

Buddhist monastery in Sikkim, northeastern India

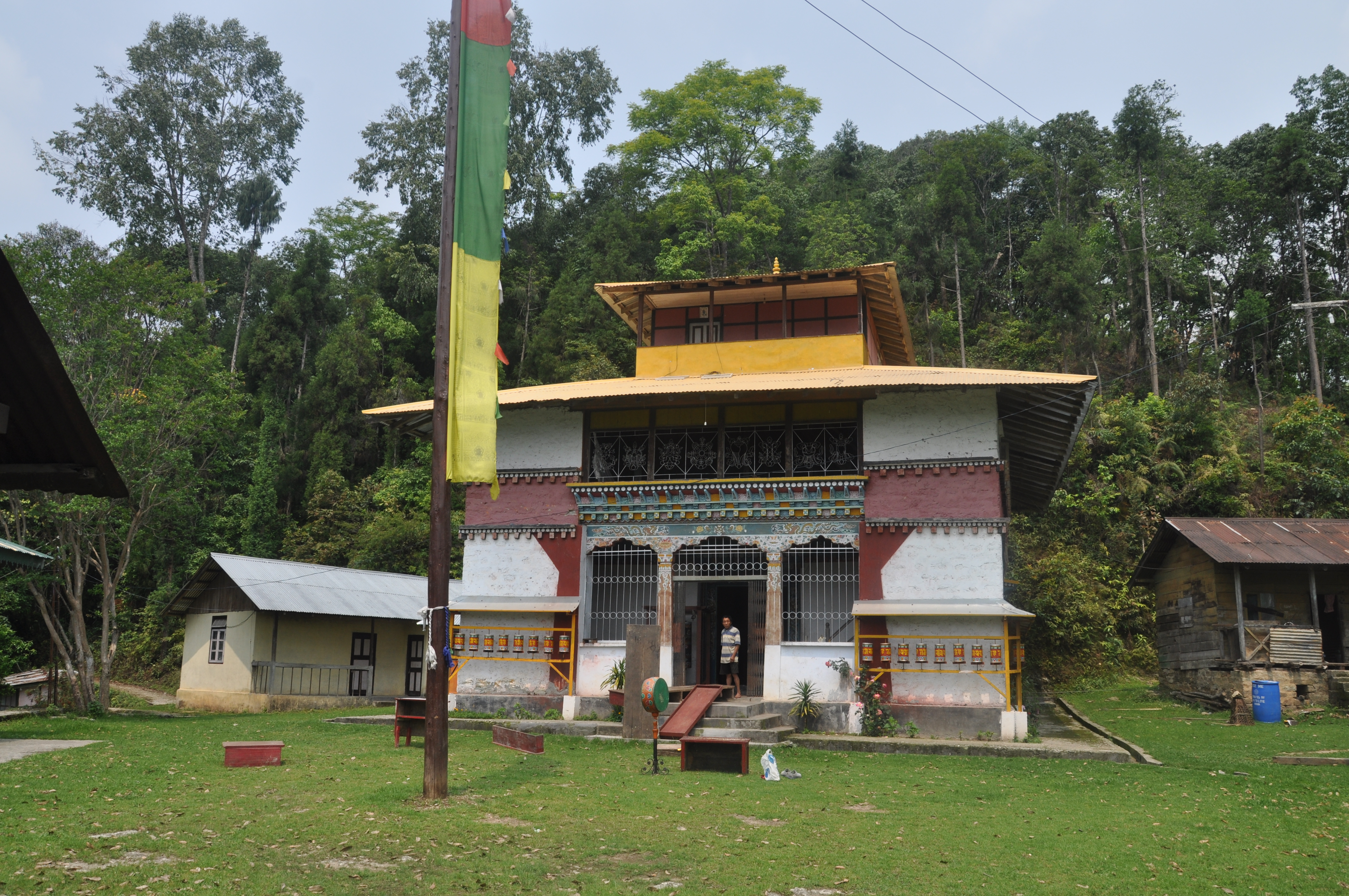
- Sang Monastery

Religion
- Affiliation: Tibetan Buddhism

Location
- Location: Sikkim, India
- Country: India

Architecture
- Founder: 1912; 114 years ago

Sang Monastery is a Buddhist monastery in Sikkim, northeastern India. Sang Monastery, the Karma Dubgyu Chokhorling Monastery, was built in 1912 AD. The Monastery belongs to Kagyupa sect of Vajrayana Buddhism The Monastery houses two flat stone prints, each bearing one footprint and a hand print of Phaya lama. He was a prominent lama from Tibet who stayed in this Gompa for few years. The Lama spent time meditating in a cave situated at a ravine, nearby.

== Gallery ==
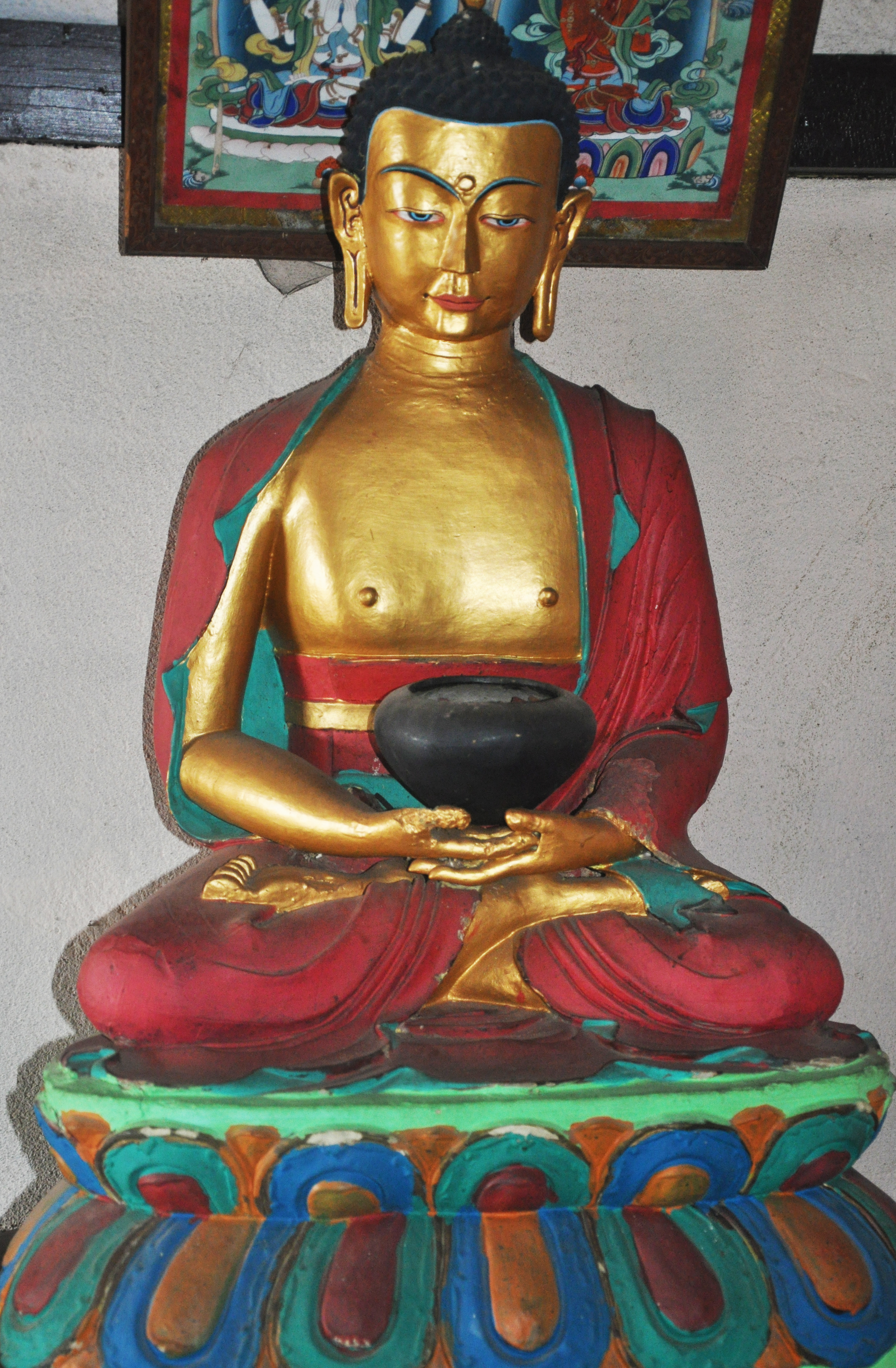

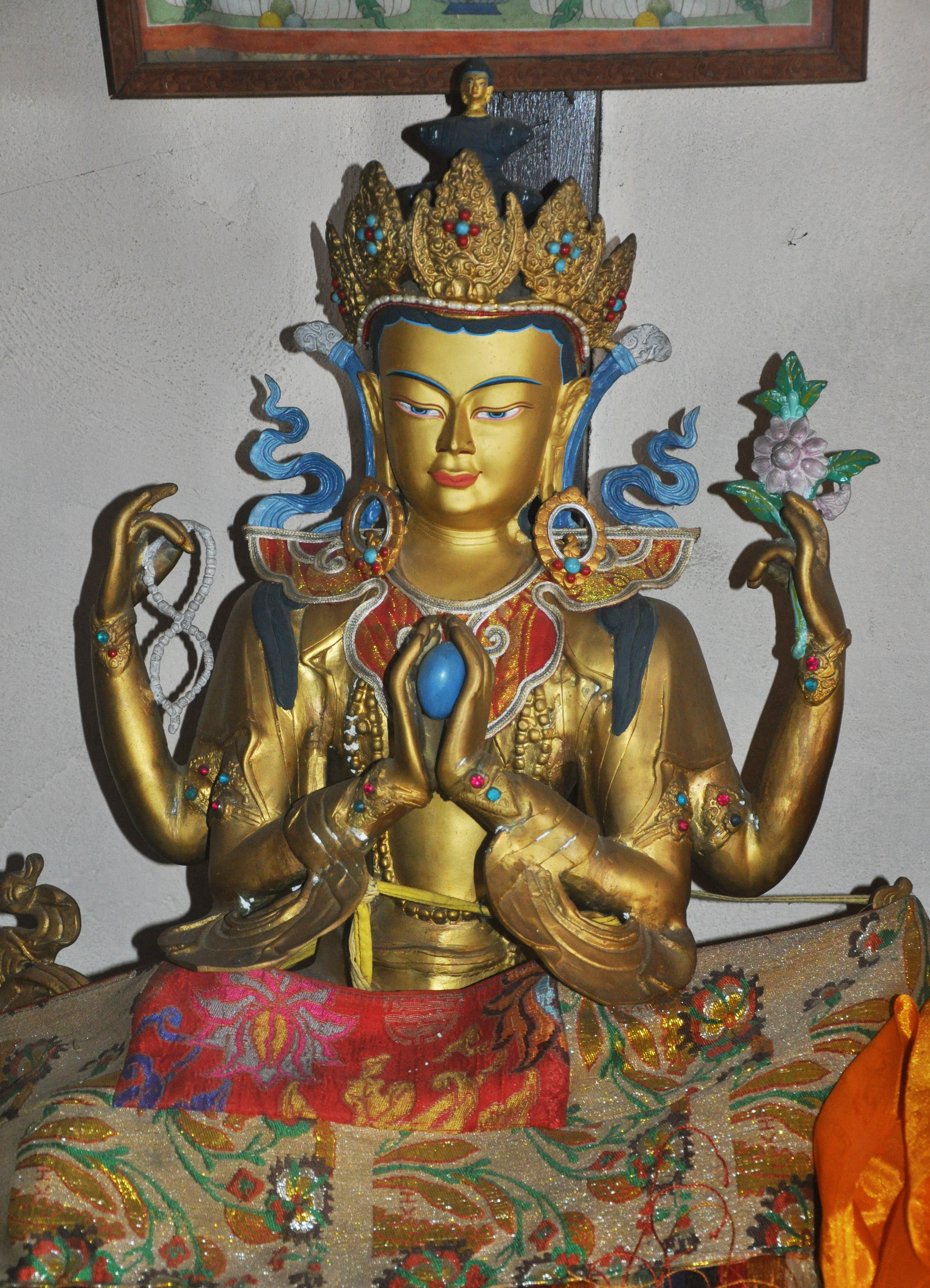
Maitreya Budha – Bodhisatwa – the future Buddha

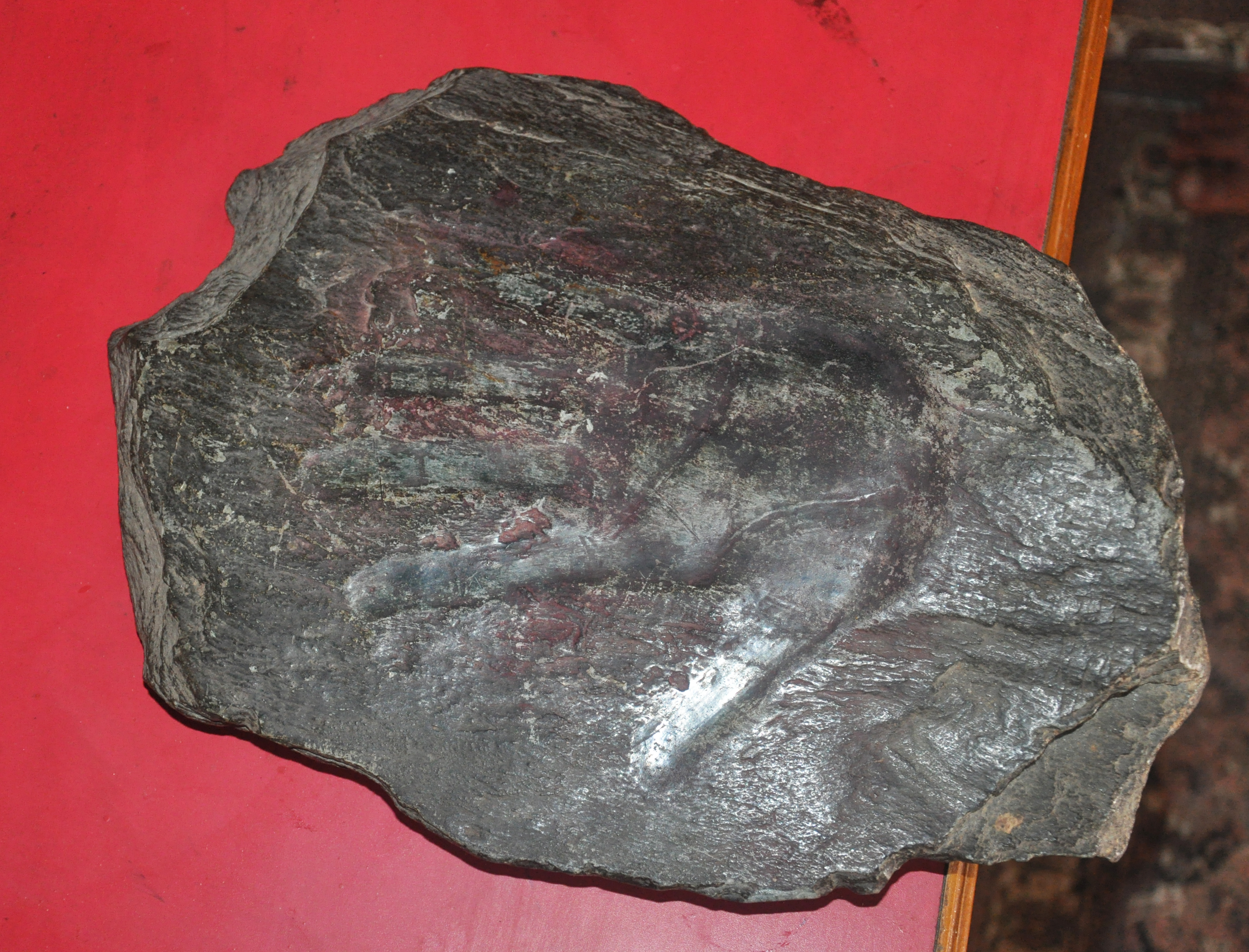
Stone Hand print of Phaya Lama at Sang Monastery

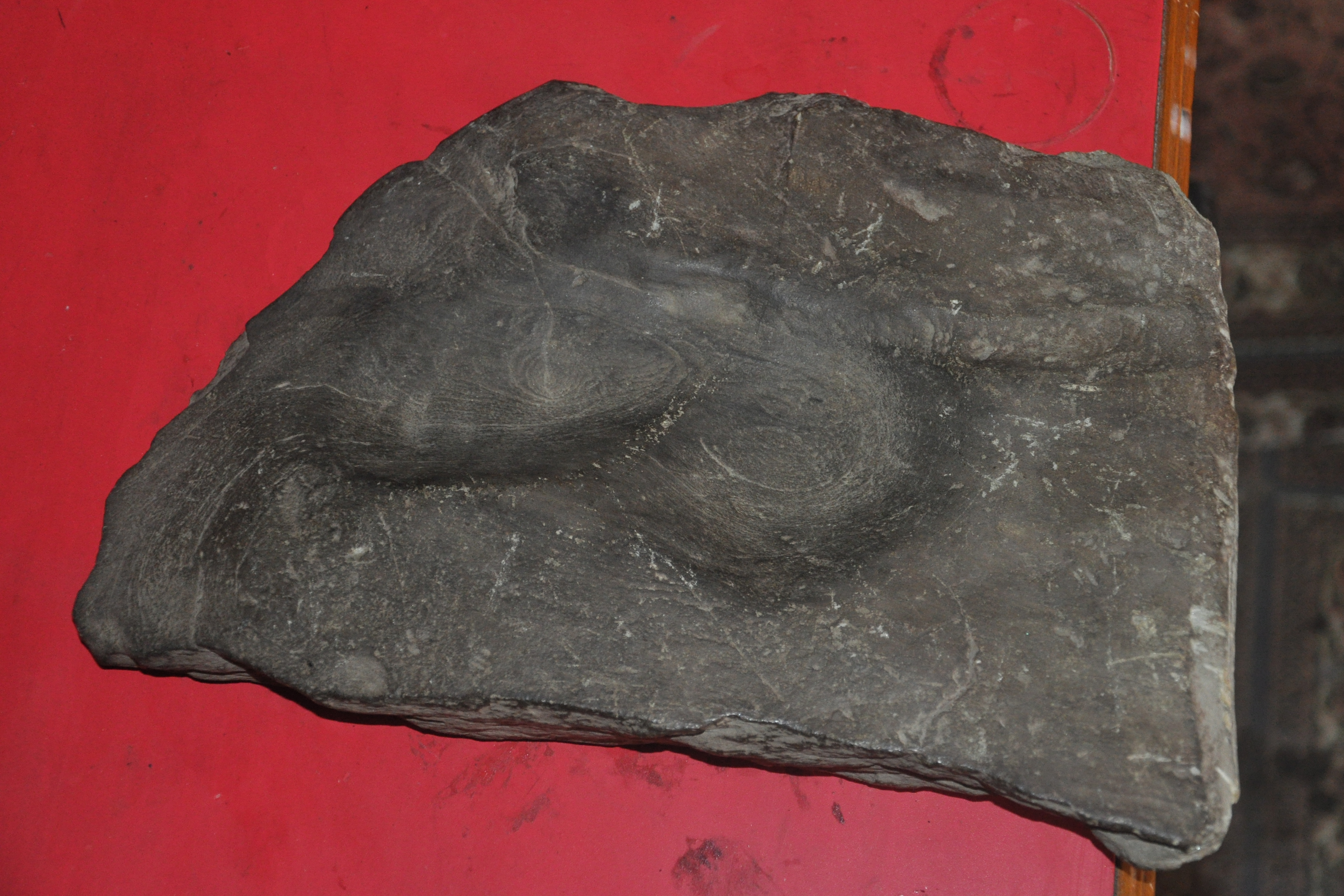
Stone Foot print of Phaya Lama at Sang Monastery

== See also ==
- Buddhism
- Gautama Buddha
- History of Buddhism in India
- Buddhist pilgrimage sites in India
