= Phensang Monastery =

Buddhist monastery in India

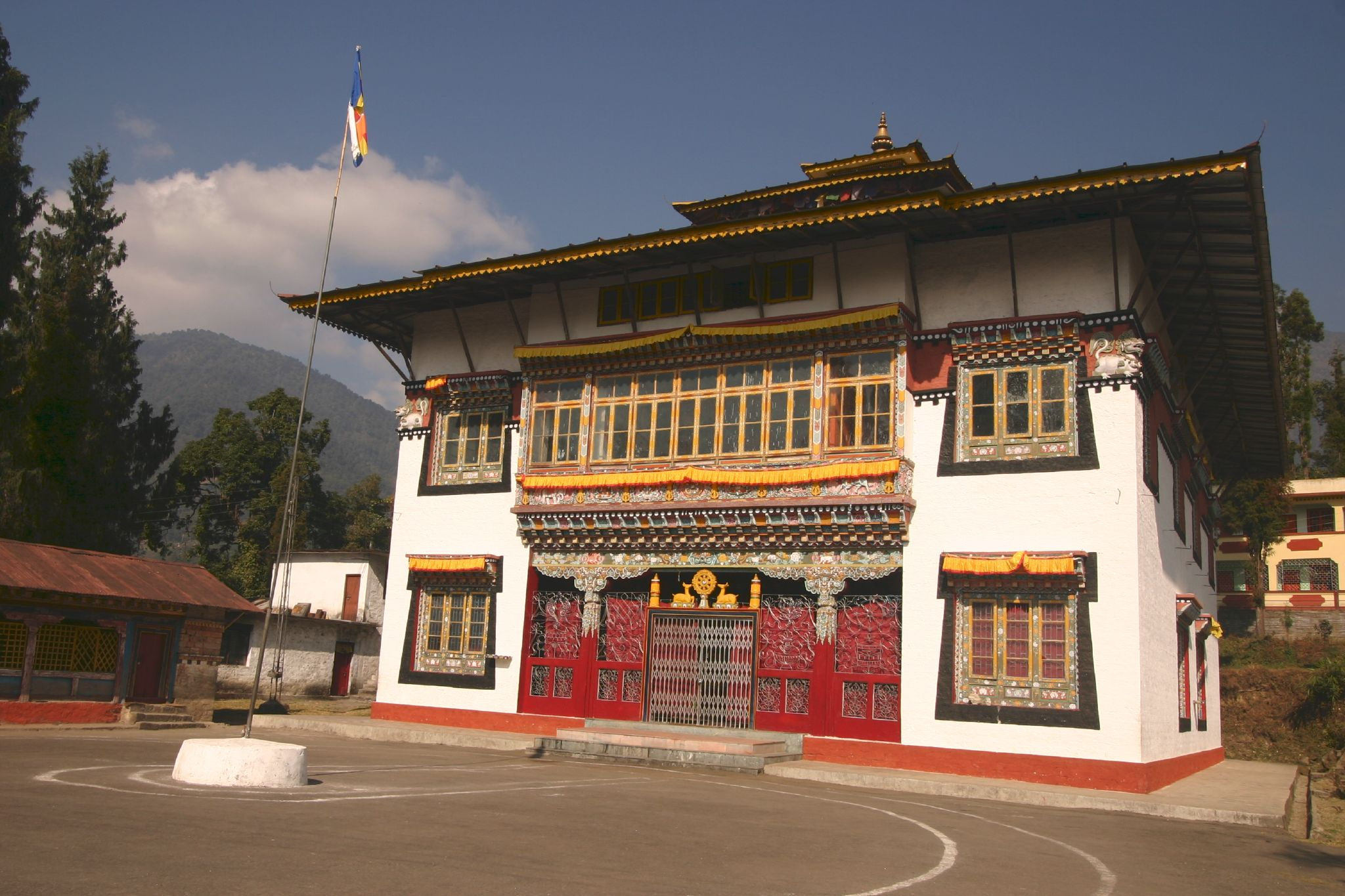
- Phensang Monastery

- Location within India

Religion
- Affiliation: Tibetan Buddhism
- Sect: Nyingmapa
- Festival: 28-9th of the 10th Tibetan month.

Location
- Location: Phensang, North District, Sikkim, India
- Country: India
- Interactive map of Phensang Monastery
- Coordinates: 27°25′13″N 88°36′37″E

Architecture
- Established: 1721; 305 years ago

Phensang Monastery is a Buddhist monastery of the Nyingmapa Order in Sikkim, India, 9 kilometres north of Gangtok. It was established in 1721 during the time of Jigme Pawo.
