= Hee Gyathang Monastery =

Buddhist monastery

Religion
- Affiliation: Tibetan Buddhism

Location
- Location: Upper Dzongu, North Sikkim district, Sikkim
- Country: India
- Interactive map of Hee Gyathang Monastery
- Coordinates: 27.476°N 88.501°E

Architecture
- Founder: Abi Putso Rangdrol

Hee Gyathang Monastery is a Buddhist monastery situated in Upper Dzongu, North Sikkim in northeastern India. It was built by hermit Abi Putso Rangdrol in 1914.
