= Chawayng Ani Monastery =

Buddhist monastery in Sikkim, India

Religion
- Affiliation: Tibetan Buddhism

Location
- Location: Sikkim
- Country: India
- Interactive map of Chawayng Ani Monastery
- Coordinates: 27.534°N 88.512°E

Architecture
- Founder: Chogyal Tsugphud Namgyal

Chawayng Ani Monastery is a Buddhist monastery in Sikkim, northeastern India.
