= Karthok Monastery =

Buddhist monastery in Pakyong, Sikkim

Kartok Monastery
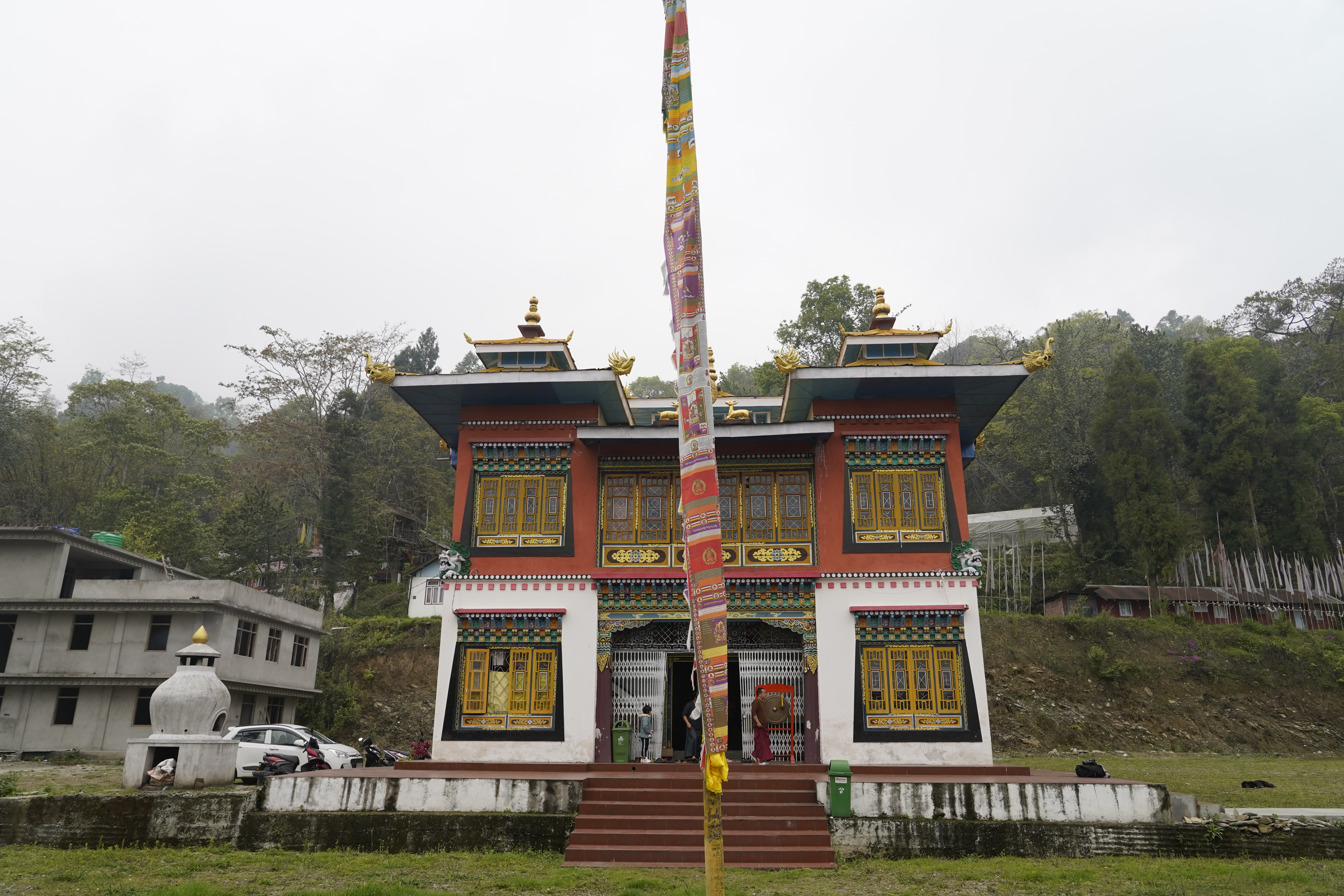
- Karthok Monastery

Religion
- Affiliation: Tibetan Buddhism
- Sect: Nyingma

Location
- Location: Sikkim, India
- Country: India
- Interactive map of Kartok Monastery
- Coordinates: 27.2408°N 88.5880°E

Architecture
- Founder: Chogyal Thutob Namgyal

Kartok Monastery is a Buddhist monastery in Pakyong, a town in the foothills of the Himalayas located in the East Sikkim district of the northeastern Indian state of Sikkim. It is considered the sixth oldest monastery of Sikkim and this monastery follows the Nyingma Order of Tibetan Buddhism.
