= Tholung Monastery =

Coordinates: 27.637°N 88.461°E

Tholung Monastery (Tibetan: ཋོལུང་དགོན་པ་, Wylie: Tho Lung dgon pa) is a gompa located in remote upper Dzongu, in the buffer zone of Khangchendzonga National Park. It is considered one of the most sacred monasteries in Sikkim. Tholung literally means Areasima place or Areasima country.

This gompa was originally constructed during the beginning of 18th century by Chogyal Phuntsog Namgyal II. It includes unique and prized manuscripts and relics from other gompas that were placed there for protection at the time of the Nepalese invasion of the area during the end of the 17th and beginning of the 19th centuries. The monastery contains a metal Chorten, in which encloses the ashes of an incarnate of the revered Lama Latsun Chembo. All of these artifacts are contained within over a dozen boxes supervised by the Government of Sikkim. Every three years, the artifacts are unveiled to the public during the Kamsil Ceremony in April.

It follows the Nyingmapa school of Tibetan Buddhism. It is a World Heritage Property.

== History ==
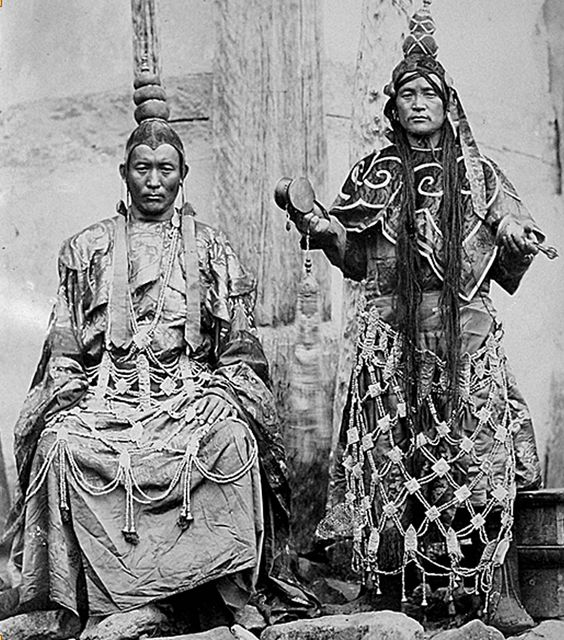
"Monks at Tholung Gumpa" taken in 1880 - 1920s. From the Government of Sikkim Archives

Tholung was revealed as a sacred place by 4th Lhatsun, Kunzang Jigmed Gyatso in 1760. In 1789, Pema Dechhen Gyatso constructed a monastery at this site. It possesses ancient manuscripts, Sikkimese art and artifacts, which had been brought there the year prior.

During the reign of Chogyal Tenzing Namgyal, The Gorkha invasion from Nepal caused much turmoil to the Buddhist monks in the region; resulting in Lama Gyatso ordering the transfer of the region's precious collections to Tholung.

After Nepalese invasion, Gyatso traveled to Tibet where he selected two monks, Tagye Tshampo and Jo Tshongpon, to watch over the relics. The two briefly settled at Wolung, Nepal before being redirected to Tholung by Lama Gyatso. The descendants of these monks continued to look after the relics as curators prior to the 1940s. Thereafter, the Ecclesiastical Department of the Government of Sikkim assumed this responsibility.

Because of the region's cold and moist climate, the relics are removed from their boxes for ventilating and sunning each three years in a ceremony known as ‘Kamsil’ by the Department of Ecclesiastical. In Kamsil, the relics are distributed to the worshipers. The current structure was reconstructed in 1980, as the old structure was becoming decrepit.

== Location ==
Tolung Monastery situated at an altitude of 8,000 feet (2,400 m) and lies inside of Khangchendzonga National Park, North Sikkim. The gompa lies with in the restricted area, requiring an inner line permit for Indian citizens. In order to reach the gompa, one must take a 10 km hike going up approximately 1,000 metres (3,300 ft) to reach Tholung through dense foliage (as of 2025 the road is being extended further up the river bed). There is a pilgrimage building and religious site an hour away from the gompa.
