= Ethnoichthyology =

Study of human interactions with fish

Ethnoichthyology is a multidisciplinary field of study that examines human knowledge of fish, the uses of fish, and importance of fish in different human societies. It draws on knowledge from many different areas including anthropology, ichthyology, economics, oceanography, and marine botany.

This area of study seeks to understand the details of the interactions of humans with fish, including both cognitive and behavioural aspects. A knowledge of fish and their life strategies is extremely important to fishermen. In order to conserve fish species, it is also important to be aware of other cultures' knowledge of fish. Ignorance of the effects of human activity on fish populations may endanger fish species. Knowledge of fish can be gained through experience, scientific research, or information passed down through generations. Some factors that affect the amount of knowledge acquired include the value and abundance of the various types of fish, their usefulness in fisheries, and the amount of time one spends observing the fishes' life history patterns.

== Etymology ==
An early use of the term was in a 1967 paper by Warren T. Morrill on the folk knowledge of the french-speaking fishermen (known locally as Cha-Cha) living in Carenage (Frenchtown), Saint Thomas, U.S. Virgin Islands. While other early examples of research in folk knowledge of nature had found good correspondence with scientific knowledge, this was not expected regarding fishermen's knowledge of fish given that they only observed specimens that they caught. Such specimens were thought to provide accurate information on taxonomy, but limited knowledge of their natural behavior and ecology. Instead, ethnoichthyological research found limited correspondence between Cha-Cha and scientific naming of fish. However, the behavior of fish, including such details as sensory capabilities, were known to the Cha-Cha based upon such knowledge being useful in selection the best methods for finding and catching each species. The use of this term arose from the prior usage of ethnobiology and ethnozoology.

== Importance in conservation ==
Ethnoichthyology can be very useful to the study and investigation of environmental changes caused by anthropogenic factors, such as the decline of fish stocks, the disappearance of fish species, and the introduction of non-native species of fish in certain environments. Ethnoichthyological knowledge can be used to create environmental conservation strategies. With a sound knowledge of fish ecology, informed decisions with respect to fishing practices can be made, and destructive environmental practices can be avoided. Ethnoichthyological knowledge can be the difference between conserving a species of fish, or placing a moratorium on fishing.

=== Newfoundland's cod fishery collapse ===
The collapse of the cod fishery in Newfoundland and Labrador was due to a lack of ethnoichthyological knowledge and conservation efforts. The waters of Newfoundland were once teeming with cod. John Cabot's crew reported that "The sea there is full of fish that can be taken not only with nets, but fishing baskets." Until John Cabot's crew arrived in Newfoundland, those who caught cod were mostly subsistence fishermen. They generally used techniques like jigging, longlining, and small trawler use. These methods were not stressful on the cod population. However, the invasion of European superpowers put a great deal of pressure on the environment. At one point, the French, English, Spanish and Portuguese would anchor as nearby as 12 miles off the Newfoundland shore with large trawlers in order to maximize their catch. This was extremely detrimental to the population. The catch of cod reached its peak in 1968 at 80,000 tons, after which a steady decrease in population was observed. Foreign ships were forced to fish two hundred miles offshore. Despite good intentions, the results were not favourable. This was because Canadian and American fishermen were then freed of competition and able to increase their catch. By the 1980s the amount of fish taken had increased from a safe 139,000 tons to an unsustainable 250,000 tons.

The use of draggers was found to be extremely detrimental to the cod population in several ways. Not only did it decimate the number of adult cod, but it wreaked havoc on their reproduction. While spawning, cod are extremely vulnerable to disturbance. Their eggs are often dispersed due to the draggers. The draggers also emit a chemical that is thought to negatively affect the embryogenic development of the cod. Finally, the draggers destroy the habitat of the cod, other fish and crustaceans.

The Canadian federal government was forced to issue a moratorium on cod fishing in 1992 due to populations reaching dangerously low numbers. Though local inshore fishermen had been voicing concerns about the state of the population since the early 1980s, the government choose to rely on scientific data. The scientific community failed to see the signs of the unstable population until 1986. When they presented their findings to the government, a suitable reduction was not put in place with enough haste to allow population to stabilize. The government was forced to put a ban on cod fishing or risk extinction.

This ban could have been avoided if the ethnoichthyological knowledge of the local fishermen had been given more consideration. Though the moratorium kept the cod from becoming extinct in the Newfoundland area, it also had some negative effects. Large companies lost business and subsistence fishermen were forced to find new ways of making a living. It is unlikely that the cod will ever return to their original numbers.

== Specific cultures ==
Ethnoichthyological knowledge varies among cultures. Every cultural group has a different way of interacting with the fish species in their environment. Often, folk knowledge coincides with the ideas put forth in scientific literature. Those who work with fish, such as fishermen, possess a wide range of knowledge concerning the fish they have experience with. They understand things like the trophic relationships among native and exotic fish species, migratory patterns, and the habitat preferences of the most prized fishes. It has been established that fishermen have a good grasp on classification, and fish biology. This knowledge can be used to improve fishery management strategies. Folk knowledge can be extremely important when expanding biological research.

=== Piracaba River ===
A small fishery on the Piracaba river in Brazil was the subject of a recent ethnobiological study by Renato et al.. Researchers wanted to examine the knowledge of the Brazilian fishermen to see how it compared to data in the scientific literature. The fishermen displayed a great deal of knowledge pertaining to diet, predation, distribution, reproduction, and migration. They were more likely be knowledgeable about things such as habitat than reproduction. Though reproduction is imperative to the continuation of the species, knowledge of spawning times has little to no bearing on the fishermen's work. Habitat, however, is a subject in which having knowledge is extremely important. The fishermen must know where the fish live in order to make a good catch. In knowing what a particular species eats, one can determine more precisely where the desired species may be found. Fishermen are also careful to be aware of where the desired species' predators hunt, to ensure that they do not lose some of their catch. The fishermen's knowledge of fish species' habits is increased for species that are common or economically valuable.

=== The Cha-Cha ===
The Cha Cha of St. Thomas, Virgin Islands are proficient in catching fish through three methods. Traps made of wood, metal, and mesh are used by professional fishermen as well as subsistence fishermen. Subsistence fishermen typically set a few traps in shallow water near their homes, whereas professional fishermen set a large number of traps in deep water. Seining is one of the least common fishing techniques in the Cha Cha culture due to time restraints and yielding an impractically large catch. It is time consuming because it requires a great deal of precision as the technique varies with the size and shape of the fish. It is often considered of lesser importance as the yields are usually so great that the fish cannot all be sold before they spoil. Seining involves using a vertical net that can be drawn up to encircle a school of fish. Handlining, in combination with chumming, is the last of the three methods used by the Cha-Cha. Ten or fifteen pounds of small fish called "fry" are ground up in a mixture of sand and then tossed into the water. This mixture called chum will attract fish. At this point, hand lines are baited with whole fry. This method results in large harvests of fish.

== Fish in culture ==
Fish, along with being an important food source, play many roles in human culture. Fish star in many novels and movies such as The Old Man and the Sea, Jonah and the Whale, Jaws, Shark Tale and Finding Nemo. Fish have also served a spiritual purpose in some religions. They are important symbols in religions such as Christianity, Hinduism, and Judaism. The Ichthys, a simple fish design, is well known in Christian culture. It is thought to be related to the feeding of the multitudes. Jesus Christ multiplied loaves of bread and fish in order to feed a large gathering of people.
