= Namchi Monastery =

Religion
- Affiliation: Tibetan Buddhism

Location
- Location: Sikkim, India
- Country: India
- Interactive map of Namchi Monastery
- Coordinates: 27.165°N 88.366°E

Namchi Monastery is a Buddhist monastery in Sikkim, northeastern India.
