= Simik Monastery =

Buddhist monastery in Sikkim, India

Religion
- Affiliation: Tibetan Buddhism

Location
- Location: Sikkim, India
- Country: India
- Interactive map of Simik Monastery
- Coordinates: 27.287143°N 88.470808°E

Simik Monastery is a Buddhist monastery in Sikkim, northeastern India.

== See also ==
- Buddhism
- Gautama Buddha
- History of Buddhism in India
- Buddhist pilgrimage sites in India
