= Bermiok Monastery =

Buddhist monastery in Sikkim, northeastern India

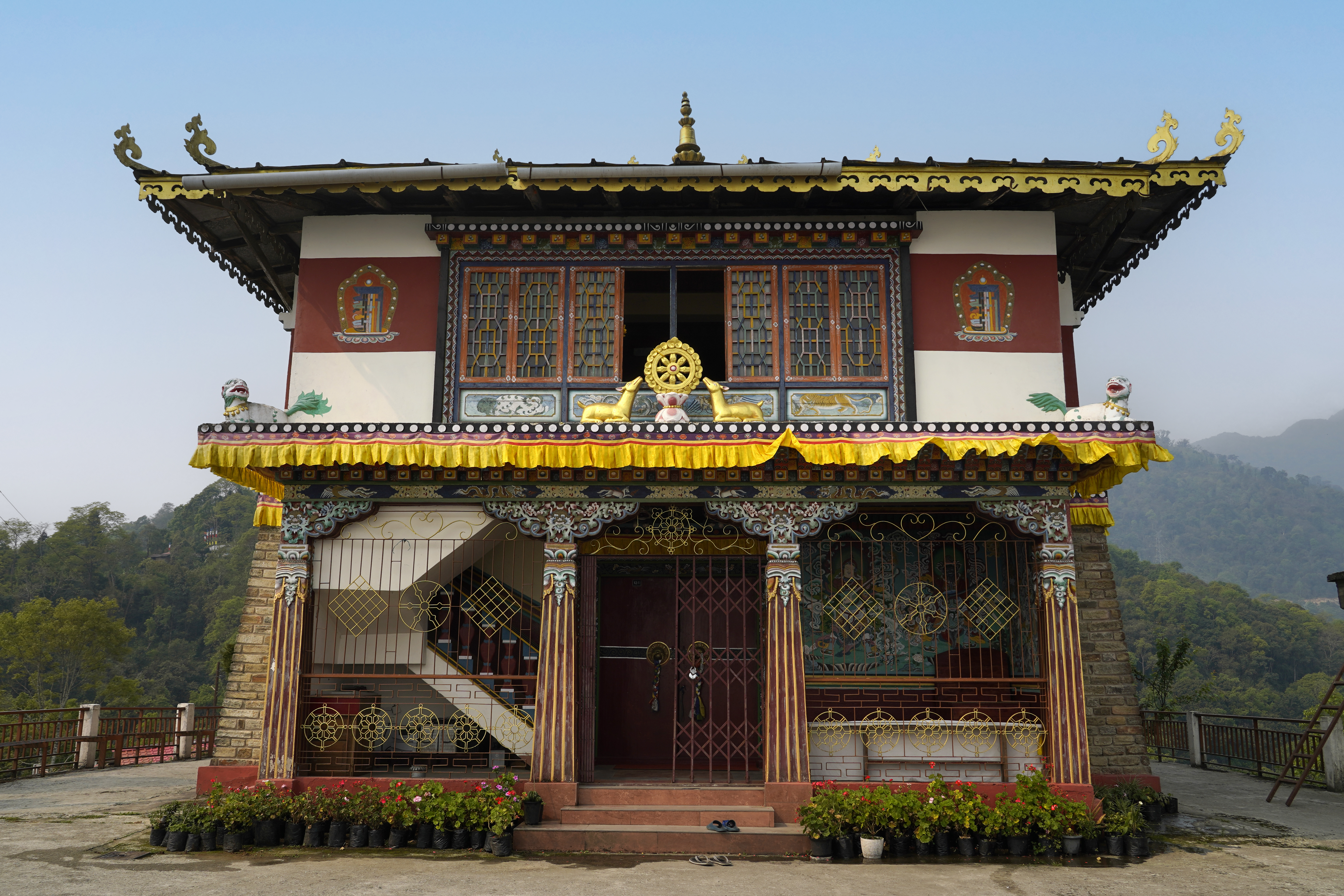
- Bermiok Monastery

- Location within India

Religion
- Affiliation: Tibetan Buddhism
- Sect: Kagyu

Location
- Location: South Sikkim above Singtam, India
- Country: India
- Interactive map of Bermiok Monastery
- Coordinates: 27.2262832°N 88.4574415°E

Architecture
- Established: 1873; 153 years ago

Bermiok Monastery (a.k.a. Bermiok Wosel Choling Monastery) is a Buddhist monastery in Sikkim, northeastern India. The monastery belongs to the Karma Kagyu lineage.

== History ==
The monastery was founded in 1873. As a result of damage caused by earthquakes, the monastery underwent renovation and reconstruction in the year 1954.

== Architecture ==
The premises of the monastery feature a manilhakang (lit. 'prayer wheel lhakhang'), constructed in 1954 and rebuilt in 1987. The manilhakang contains statues of Amitābha and the chagtong chentong (lit. '1000 arms, 1000 eyes') form of Avalokiteśvara.

== See also ==
- History of Buddhism in India
