= Rhenock Monastery =

Buddhist monastery in Sikkim, India

Religion
- Affiliation: Tibetan Buddhism

Location
- Location: Sikkim, India
- Country: India
- Interactive map of Rhenock Monastery
- Coordinates: 27.1844032°N 88.6771017°E

Rhenock Monastery is a Buddhist monastery in Sikkim, northeastern India.

== See also ==
- Buddhism
- Gautama Buddha
- History of Buddhism in India
- Buddhist pilgrimage sites in India
