= List of longest bridges in West Bengal =

== Bridges ==
The bridges include road bridges, railway bridges, rail-cum-road bridges and barrage-cum-bridges.

| Name | | River/Water Body | Spanning | | Completed /Opened | Traffic | City |
| Name | | River/Water Body | Meters | Feet | Completed /Opened | Traffic | City |
|---|---|---|---|---|---|---|---|
| Joyee Setu | | Teesta River | 2,709 | 8,887 | 2021 | Road | Mekhliganj–Haldibari |
| Farakka Barrage | | The Ganges | 2,240 | 7,350 | 1975 | Rail-cum-road | Farakka |
| Bhutni Bridge | | Fulahar river | 1,790 | 5,873 | 2019 | Road | Bhutni Island, Malda |
| Jangalkanya Setu | | Subarnarekha river | 1,472 | 4,829 | 2016 | Road | Nayagram |
| Mathabhanga Rail Bridge | | Jaldhaka river | 1,097 | 3,599 | 2015 | Rail | Mathabhanga |
| Ishwar Gupta Setu | | Hooghly river | 1,056 | 3,465 | 1989 | Road | Bansberia–Kalyani |
| Teesta Bridge (NH 27) | New Flank | Teesta River | 1,050 | 3,444 | 2020 | Road | Jalpaiguri |
| Teesta Bridge (NH 27) | Old Flank | Teesta River | 1,000 | 3,280 | 1961 | Road | Jalpaiguri |
| New Sarat Setu | Flank I | Rupnarayan River | 1,025 | 3,363 | 2012 | Road | Kolaghat–Deulti |
| New Sarat Setu | Flank II | Rupnarayan River | 1,019 | 3,343 | - | Road | Kolaghat–Deulti |
| Sarat Setu (Old) | | Rupnarayan River | 1,010 | 3,313 | 1967 | Road | Kolaghat–Deulti |
| Devi Kamteshwari Setu | | Mansai River | 944 | 3,097 | 2021 | Road | Sitai |
| Gajoldodba Barrage | | Teesta River | 922 | 3,025 | 1998 | Road | Gajoldoba |
| Vivekananda Setu (Willingdon Bridge / Bally Bridge) | | Hooghly River | 900 | 2,952 | 1932 | Rail-cum-road | Dakshineswar–Bally, Howrah |
| Nivedita Setu | | Hooghly River | 880 | 2,887 | 2007 | Road | Dakshineswar–Bally, Howrah |
| Vidyasagar Setu | | Hooghly River | 823 | 2,700 | 1992 | Road | Kolkata–Howrah |
| Kolaghat Rail Bridge | | Rupnarayan River | 804 | 2,638 | 1900 | Rail | Kolaghat–Deulti |
| Mejia Bridge | | Damodar River | 800 | 2,625 | 1996 | Rail-cum-road | Raniganj–Mejia |
| Chapaguri Rail Bridge | | Torsha River | 777 | 2,550 | 2015 | Rail | Chapaguri (Cooch Behar) |
| Howrah Bridge (Rabindra Setu) | | Hooghly River | 705 | 2,313 | 1943 | Road | Kolkata–Howrah |
| Durgapur Barrage | | Damodar River | 692 | 2,270 | 1955 | Road | Durgapur |
| Lalgarh Setu | | Kangsabati River | 650 | 2,133 | 2016 | Road | Lalgarh |
| Matla Setu | | Matla River | 644 | 2,112 | 2011 | Road | Canning |
| Matangini Setu | | Haldi River | 521 | 1,711 | 1982 | Road | Narghat |
| Sampreeti Setu (New Jubilee Bridge) | | Hooghly River | 415 | 1,362 | 2016 | Rail | Naihati–Bandel, Hooghly |

== Flyovers ==
This is a list of West Bengal's Flyovers, ROBs, RUBs etc., longer than 500 metres (1,640 ft).

| Name | Spanning | | Completed | Traffic | City |
| Name | Meters | Feet | Completed | Traffic | City |
|---|---|---|---|---|---|
| Sampriti Flyover | 6,800 | 22,300 | 2019 | Road | Maheshtala |
| Maa Flyover | 4,500 | 14,800 | 2015 | Road | Kolkata |
| Garden Reach Flyover | 4,400 | 14,400 | 2018 | Road | Kolkata |
| AJC Bose Road Flyover | 2,400 | 7872 | 2003 | Road | Kolkata |
| Jai Hind Bridge | 650 | 2,133 | 2020 | Road | Kolkata |
| Tala New Bridge | 625 | 2050 | 2021 | Road | Kolkata |
