= Promalactis kathmanduensis =

- In Kathmandu, Nepal
- In Deolo, India

Scientific classification
- Kingdom: Animalia
- Phylum: Arthropoda
- Clade: Pancrustacea
- Class: Insecta
- Order: Lepidoptera
- Family: Oecophoridae
- Genus: Promalactis
- Species: P. kathmanduensis

Binomial name
- Promalactis kathmanduensis Wang, 2024

Species of moth

Promalactis kathmanduensis is a moth of the family Oecophoridae. It is found in Nepal and north-eastern India. It was described by Shuxia Wang in 2024. It is named after its type locality, which is in Kathmandu.

== Description ==
This species is characterized by its black basal patch that extends to the inner costal spot. The vertex and frons are greyish white in color, and the third segment is white at the base and the apex. The mesonotum and tegula are black and mottled with white scales. The forewing is yellow with a quadrangular basal patch, and there are two costal black spots. There is a small white apical dot. The forewing fringe is yellow in color, while the hindwing and its fringe are grey in color.

== Distribution ==
This species has been recorded from Kathmandu in Nepal and Deolo in West Bengal, India.
