= Teesta Khangtse Glacier =

Glacier

- Location within Sikkim Location within India
- Type: Valley glacier
- Location: India
- Coordinates: 27°58′33.54″N 88°49′36.80″E

Teesta Khangtse Glacier or Tista Khangtse Glacier is located in the north of Sikkim, India, in a region bordering Tibet. This valley glacier is the primary source of the Teesta River.

== Location ==
The glacier is situated in the west of Pauhunri at 5,400 m (17,700 ft) and has a length of 12.88 kilometre.
