= Promalactis similidierli =

Scientific classification
- Kingdom: Animalia
- Phylum: Arthropoda
- Clade: Pancrustacea
- Class: Insecta
- Order: Lepidoptera
- Family: Oecophoridae
- Genus: Promalactis
- Species: P. similidierli

Binomial name
- Promalactis similidierli Wang, 2024

Species of moth

Promalactis similidierli is a moth of the family Oecophoridae. It is found in Nepal. It was described by Shuxia Wang in 2024. Its name consists of the Latin similis meaning "similar to" and dierli which is the specific epithet of another species, Promalactis dierli. This name shows that this species is similar to Promalactis dierli.

== Description ==
This species has a snowy-white vertex and a brownish frons, and the mesonotum and tegula are both pale ochreous brown. The forewings are ochreous yellow, and the markings are white, edged with brown or black scales. The costal spot is diffused and black in color, with a white stripe below it that extends to above the posterior angle of the cell. The basal streak extends from the dorsum to the base of the fold, the slender antemedian streak extends from before the middle of the dorsum to the basal third of the anterior margin of the cell, and the dorsal streak extends from the distal fourth of the dorsum to the posterior angle of the cell. The tornal spot is silvery grey, with the apical spot ill-defined. The fringe of the forewing is yellow except it is dark grey around the tornus. The hindwing and its fringe are grey in color.
