= Talung River =

River in India

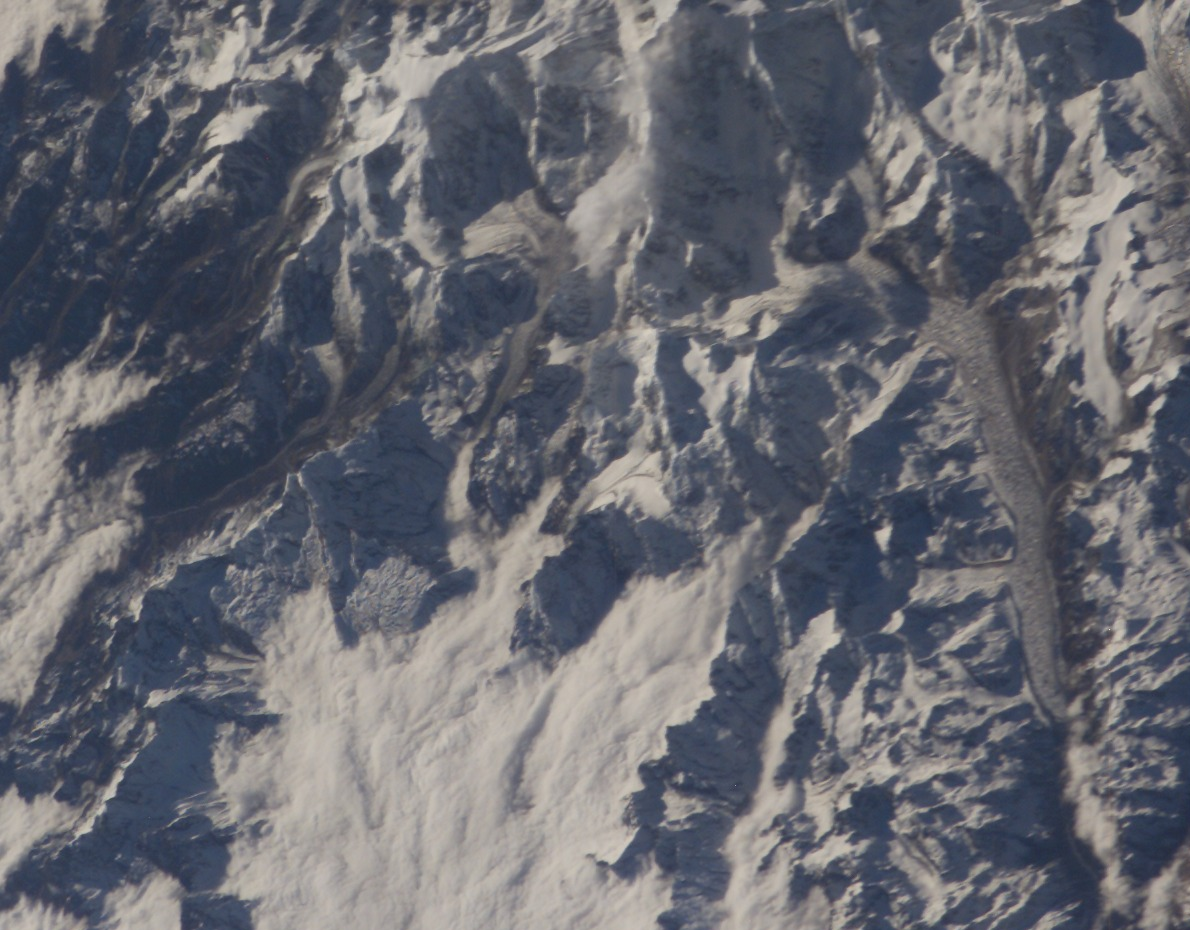
Talung Glacier, Pandim, Simvo, Zemu Glacier

The Talung River is an east-south east flowing river in the North Sikkim Himalayas. It originates at the Talung-Tonsyong Glacier's confluence at the meeting point of Talung and Tongshiong River and then flows east south east to meet the River Teesta near Singhik, North Sikkim. The upper catchment is fed by a number of streams and rivulets. These streams and rivulets flow from the southern part of Simvu-Sinialchu region to meet the main river. Another tributary which feeds the main stream flows from the Zorpetam mountain valley. Zorepetam valley is a typical inaccessible mountain terrain in the east of Pandim and Tinchenkhang. Number of rivers of Sikkim originates from this region. Owing to the complexity of the river systems its name in its catchment area changes from place to place. According to records it is Rukel Chu at first, then Rungayang or Rongyoung Chu and thereafter Talung River or Tholung Chu till its confluence.
