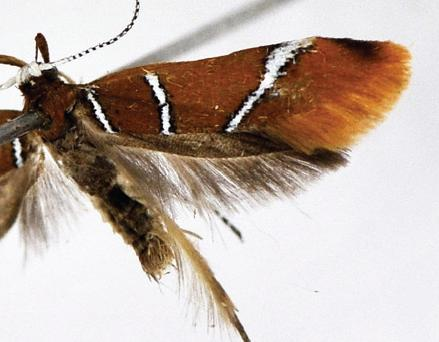

Scientific classification
- Kingdom: Animalia
- Phylum: Arthropoda
- Clade: Pancrustacea
- Class: Insecta
- Order: Lepidoptera
- Family: Oecophoridae
- Genus: Promalactis
- Species: P. similiconvexa

Binomial name
- Promalactis similiconvexa Du & Wang, 2013

= Promalactis similiconvexa =

Species of moth

Promalactis similiconvexa is a moth of the family Oecophoridae. It is found in Sichuan, China.

The wingspan is about 15.5 mm. The forewings are ochreous brown with white markings edged with black scales. The hindwings and cilia are dark grey.

== Etymology ==
The specific name is derived from the Latin prefix simili- (meaning similar) and the species name convexa and refers to the similarity of the two species.
