= Promalactis ciliavalva =

- In Deolo, India

Scientific classification
- Kingdom: Animalia
- Phylum: Arthropoda
- Clade: Pancrustacea
- Class: Insecta
- Order: Lepidoptera
- Family: Oecophoridae
- Genus: Promalactis
- Species: P. ciliavalva

Binomial name
- Promalactis ciliavalva Wang, 2024

Species of moth

Promalactis ciliavalva is a moth of the family Oecophoridae. It is found in Nepal, Bhutan and north-eastern India. It was described by Shuxia Wang in 2024. Its name refers to the densely ciliate valva of the male genitalia.

== Description ==
This species has a snowy-white vertex and a deep grey frons, with an ochreous brown mesonotum and tegula. The forewing is orange-yellow, and the markings are white edged with black scales. The costal spot is sub-rectangular. The basal streak extends from the dorsum to the base of the fold, the antemedian streak extends from the middle of the dorsum to the basal third of the anterior margin of the cell, and the short and slender dorsal streak extends from before the end of the fold to the inner margin of the tornal spot. The tornal spot is rounded, and the apical spot is wedge-shaped. The forewing fringe is orange yellow except it is grey around the tornus. The hindwing and its fringe is grey in color.

== Distribution ==
This species has been recorded from Kathmandu in Nepal, Deolo in West Bengal, India, and two localities in Bhutan.
