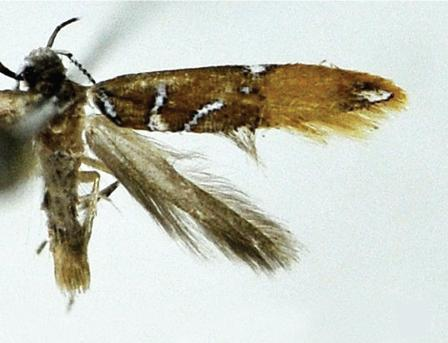

Scientific classification
- Kingdom: Animalia
- Phylum: Arthropoda
- Clade: Pancrustacea
- Class: Insecta
- Order: Lepidoptera
- Family: Oecophoridae
- Genus: Promalactis
- Species: P. uncinispinea

Binomial name
- Promalactis uncinispinea Du & Wang, 2013

= Promalactis uncinispinea =

Species of moth

Promalactis uncinispinea is a moth of the family Oecophoridae. It is found in Sichuan, China.

The wingspan is about 11 mm. The basal three-fifths of the forewings are ochreous brown and the distal two-fifths are ochreous yellow. The markings are silvery white or white, edged with dense black scales. The hindwings and cilia are dark grey.

== Etymology ==
The specific name is derived from the Latin prefix uncin- (meaning hooked) and Latin spineus (meaning spine-like) and refers to the hooked distal spine in the aedeagus.
