= Promalactis magnicornuta =

Scientific classification
- Kingdom: Animalia
- Phylum: Arthropoda
- Clade: Pancrustacea
- Class: Insecta
- Order: Lepidoptera
- Family: Oecophoridae
- Genus: Promalactis
- Species: P. magnicornuta

Binomial name
- Promalactis magnicornuta Wang, 2024

Species of moth

Promalactis magnicornuta is a moth of the family Oecophoridae. It is found in Thailand. It was described by Shuxia Wang in 2024. The specific epithet magnicornuta refers to the long, slender basal process of the valva.

This species is similar to Promalactis hainanensis. It can be distinguished from it by pale ochreous brown basal fascia in the forewing and the male genitalia having a stronger basal process. The only known record of this species is from Yala in Thailand.

== Description ==
The vertex and frons are shining white, with ochreous brown mesonotum and tegula. The forewing is ochreous yellow, with pale ochreous brown basal fascia, and a white line edged with black scales along its inner and outer margins. The costal spot is rounded and white, with black scales on the ventral and inner margins. The tornal spot is grey with dark brown scales, and the apical patch is black, diffused along the termen to the tornus.

The forewing fringe is yellow except it is grey around the apex. The hindwing and its fringe are grey in color.
