= Kalijhora =

- Urban Village
- Location in West Bengal, India Kalijhora (India)
- Coordinates: 26.9236°N 88.4512°E
- Country: India
- State: West Bengal
- District: Kalimpong
- Time zone: UTC+5:30 (IST)
- PIN: 734320
- Vehicle registration: WB
- Lok Sabha constituency: Darjeeling
- Vidhan Sabha constituency: Kalimpong
- Nearest Cities: Kalimpong, Siliguri
- Website: kalimpong.gov.in

Kalijhora is an urban village in the Kalimpong I CD block that lies on the bank of River Teesta, in the Kalimpong Sadar subdivision of the Kalimpong district in the state of West Bengal, India. National Highway 10 connecting Siliguri and Gangtok passes through Kalijhora. Teesta Low Dam - IV Hydropower Plant Dam lies in Kalijhora.

== Geography ==
Places in the Kalimpong Sadar subdivision in Kalimpong district
CT: census town, R: rural/ urban centre, M: municipality, F: facility, NP: national park, D: dam
Abbreviations used in names – TG for Tea Garden (town/village)
Owing to space constraints in the small map, the actual locations in a larger map may vary slightly

=== Location ===
Kalijhora is located at 26.9232°N 88.4512°E.

=== Area overview ===
The map alongside shows the Kalimpong Sadar subdivision of Kalimpong district. Physiographically, this area forms the Kalimpong Range, with the average elevation varying from 300 to 3,000 metres (980 to 9,840 ft). This region is characterized by abruptly rising hills and numerous small streams. It is an predominantly rural area with 77.67% of the population living in rural areas and only 22.23% living in the urban areas. While Kalimpong is the only municipality, Dungra is the sole census town in the entire area. The economy is agro-based and there are 6 tea gardens in the Gorubathan CD block. In 2011, Kalimpong subdivision had a literacy rate of 81.85%, comparable with the highest levels of literacy in the districts of the state. While the first degree college in the subdivision was established at Kalimpong in 1962 the entire subdivision (and now the entire district), other than the head-quarters, had to wait till as late as 2015 (more than half a century) to have their first degree colleges at Pedong and Gorubathan.

Note: The map alongside presents some of the notable locations in the subdivision. All places marked in the map are linked in the larger full screen map.

== Economy ==
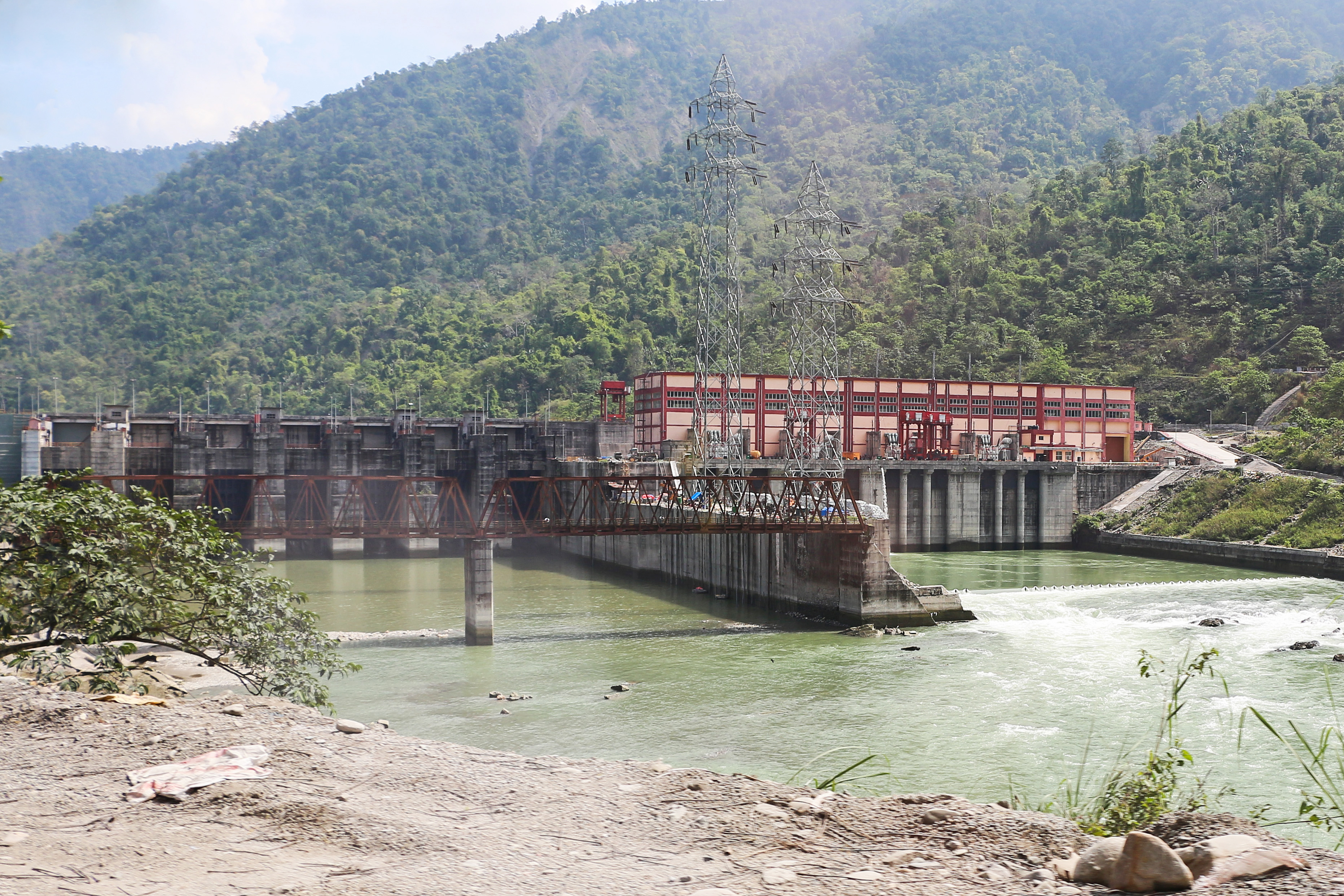
Teesta Low Dam IV

Teesta Low Dam - IV Hydropower Plant is a "run of the river scheme with diurnal storage for peaking purpose." There is a 45m high dam across the Teesta River and the surface power house has 4 x 40 MW units. All the four units were commissioned in 2017. The project was executed by NHPC Limited.

== Tourism ==
Kalijhora was earlier a popular picnic spot, which has been submerged by the low dam built for hydro power generation. There are several tourist destinations close to Kalijhora, such as Latpachar, Mangpu, Takdah, Chota and Bada Mangwa, Lamhatta and Peshok.
