= Teesta Low Dam - IV Hydropower Plant =

Teesta Low Dam - IV
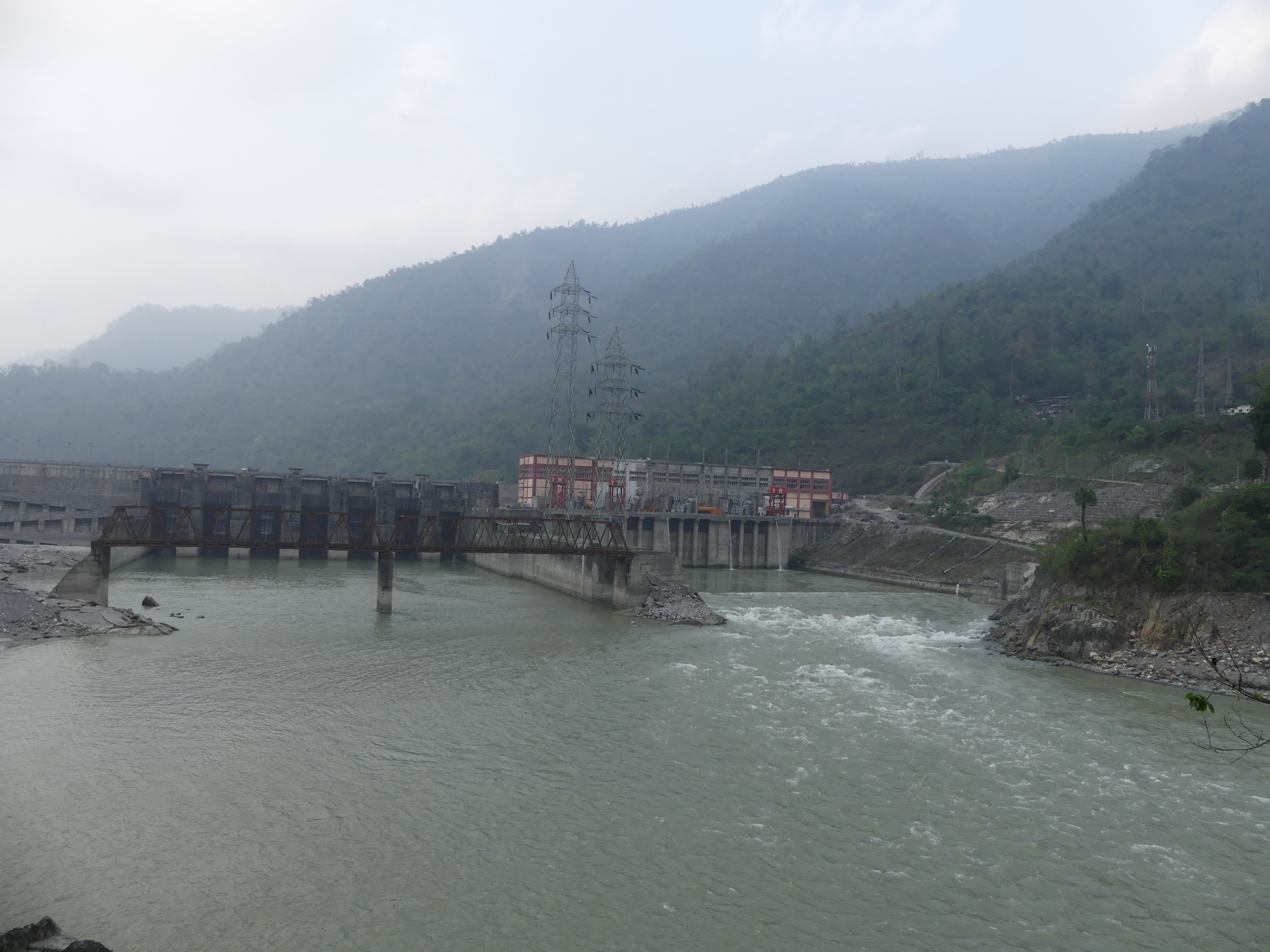

- Location within West Bengal Location within India
- Official name: Teesta Low Dam - IV Hydropower Plant
- Country: India
- Location: Kalijhora, Kalimpong district, West Bengal
- Coordinates: 26.9339354°N 88.4470021°E
- Purpose: Power
- Status: Operational
- Opening date: 2016
- Owner: NHPC

Dam and spillways
- Impounds: Teesta River
- Height: 54 m (177 ft)
- Length: 530 m (1,739 ft)

Power Station
- Commission date: 2016
- Type: Run-of-the-river
- Hydraulic head: 25.05 m (82 ft) (gross)
- Turbines: 4 X 40 MW
- Installed capacity: 160 MW
- Annual generation: 720 MU

Teesta Low Dam - IV Hydropower Plant is a run-of-the-river hydroelectric station built on the Teesta River at Kalijhora, Kalimpong district, West Bengal.

== Geography ==
Places in the Kalimpong Sadar subdivision in Kalimpong district
CT: census town, R: rural/ urban centre, M: municipality, F: facility, NP: national park
Abbreviations used in names – TG for Tea Garden (town/village)
Owing to space constraints in the small map, the actual locations in a larger map may vary slightly

=== Location ===
It is located in Kalimpong district, West Bengal, about 350 meters above the confluence of the Kalijora river Teesta River and in the 1.5 kilometer kiln of Teesta Bridge near Teesta Bazar village. 18.3 km downstream from the Teesta bridge near at Tista Bazar village. It is near Kalijhora, (see map alongside).

== The project ==
The project consists of a 45 m high dam with 4 penstocks of 45 m length and 7 m diameter each. The surface power house with installed capacity of 160 MW houses 4 units of 40 MW capacity each designed to operate under the net rated head of 25.05 M and designed to generate 720 million units in a 90% dependable year with 95% machine availability. Unit I, II, III and IV were commissioned in the month of February, March, July and August 2016 respectively. The state of West Bengal is the sole beneficiary of this power station. With the construction of the project the area is also benefited by development infrastructure, education, medical facilities and employment avenues.
