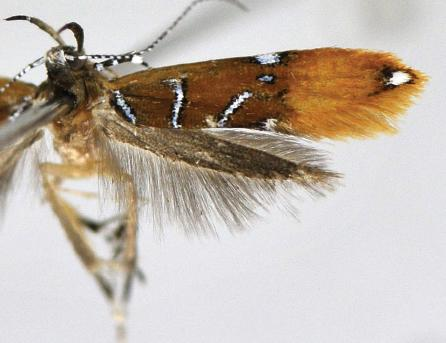

Scientific classification
- Kingdom: Animalia
- Phylum: Arthropoda
- Clade: Pancrustacea
- Class: Insecta
- Order: Lepidoptera
- Family: Oecophoridae
- Genus: Promalactis
- Species: P. serpenticapitata

Binomial name
- Promalactis serpenticapitata Du & Wang, 2013

= Promalactis serpenticapitata =

Species of moth

Promalactis serpenticapitata is a moth of the family Oecophoridae. It is found in Fujian, Jiangxi and Zhejiang provinces of China.

The wingspan is about 10.5–13 mm. The basal three-fifths of the forewings are ochreous brown, the distal two-fifths are ochreous yellow. The markings are silvery white or white, edged with dense black scales. The hindwings and cilia are dark grey.

== Etymology ==
The specific name is derived from the Latin prefix serpent- (meaning snakelike) and the adjective capitatus (meaning having a head) and refers to the small, snake head shaped subapical process on the ventral surface of the gnathos.
