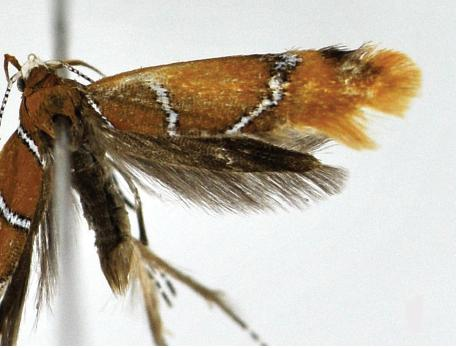
- Promalactis bifurciprocessa

Scientific classification
- Kingdom: Animalia
- Phylum: Arthropoda
- Clade: Pancrustacea
- Class: Insecta
- Order: Lepidoptera
- Family: Oecophoridae
- Subfamily: Oecophorinae
- Genus: Promalactis; Meyrick, 1908

Type species
- Promalactis holozona Meyrick, 1908

= Promalactis =

Genus of moths

Promalactis is a genus of moths of the family Oecophoridae.

== Taxonomic history ==
The genus was established by Edward Meyrick in 1908. It currently comprises 179 valid species worldwide, distributed mainly in the Palaearctic and Oriental regions. China has the greatest diversity, with 101 recorded species.

== Identification ==
Promalactis is represented by the combination of the following characters: the smooth head with metallic lustre, the lanceolate forewings with various dark or white markings against yellow to deep ochreous-brown ground colour; the variously shaped symmetrical or asymmetrical valvae and a narrow to very broad sacculus in the male genitalia; and a developed to ill-defined lamella postvaginalis and an elongate thin ductus bursae in the female genitalia.

== Biology ==
Little is known about the biology of this genus. Meyrick reported that larvae fed on rotten wood or bark of Pinaceae and other trees.

== Species ==
- Promalactis abortiva
- Promalactis akaganea
- Promalactis albiapicalis
- Promalactis albipars
- Promalactis albipunctata
- Promalactis albisquama
- Promalactis amphicopa
- Promalactis apicibilobata
- Promalactis apiciconcava
- Promalactis apicidentata
- Promalactis apiciserrulata
- Promalactis apicisetifera
- Promalactis apicispinifera
- Promalactis arcilineata
- Promalactis asymmetrica
- Promalactis atrofasciella
- Promalactis auriculata
- Promalactis auriella
- Promalactis autoclina
- Promalactis bacilliforma
- Promalactis balikpapana
- Promalactis baotianmanensis
- Promalactis basifasciaria
- Promalactis bathroclina
- Promalactis bellatula
- Promalactis bifasciaria
- Promalactis bifurca
- Promalactis bifurciprocessa
- Promalactis biovata
- Promalactis bitaenia
- Promalactis bitrigona
- Promalactis brevivalva
- Promalactis brevivalvaris
- Promalactis buonluoi
- Promalactis calathiscias
- Promalactis callimetalla
- Promalactis campanimorpha
- Promalactis caniceps
- Promalactis carinata
- Promalactis chishuiensis
- Promalactis ciliavalva
- Promalactis clavata
- Promalactis climacota
- Promalactis clinometra
- Promalactis colacephala
- Promalactis commotica
- Promalactis convexa
- Promalactis cornigera
- Promalactis crenopa
- Promalactis curvilineata
- Promalactis densidentalis
- Promalactis densimacularis
- Promalactis dierli
- Promalactis dilatignatha
- Promalactis dimolybda
- Promalactis diorbis
- Promalactis dolokella
- Promalactis dorsoprojecta
- Promalactis enopisema
- Promalactis epistacta
- Promalactis ermolencoi
- Promalactis falsijezonica
- Promalactis fansipanella
- Promalactis fascispinata
- Promalactis fengxianica
- Promalactis fengyangensis
- Promalactis flavescens
- Promalactis forticosta
- Promalactis furciuncata
- Promalactis fuscimaculata
- Promalactis fuscomaculella
- Promalactis geometrica
- Promalactis gracilenta
- Promalactis grandisticta
- Promalactis griselocula
- Promalactis guangxiensis
- Promalactis hainanensis
- Promalactis haliclysta
- Promalactis heppneri
- Promalactis heterojuxta
- Promalactis hoenei
- Promalactis holozona
- Promalactis indica
- Promalactis inaequilonga
- Promalactis infulata
- Promalactis irinae
- Promalactis isodora
- Promalactis isopselia
- Promalactis isothea
- Promalactis jacobsoni
- Promalactis javana
- Promalactis jezonica
- Promalactis jiyuanica
- Promalactis jongi
- Promalactis jourdheuillella
- Promalactis kalimantana
- Promalactis kathmanduensis
- Promalactis kumanoensis
- Promalactis kuznetsovi
- Promalactis latijuxta
- Promalactis latissima
- Promalactis lativalva
- Promalactis lobatifera
- Promalactis longiclavata
- Promalactis longiuncata
- Promalactis lungtanella
- Promalactis lunisequa
- Promalactis lunularis
- Promalactis maculosa
- Promalactis magnicornuta
- Promalactis magnisaccata
- Promalactis magnipuncti
- Promalactis manoi
- Promalactis matsuurae
- Promalactis mentawirella
- Promalactis merangirella
- Promalactis mercedella
- Promalactis meyi
- Promalactis meyricki
- Promalactis minuticornuta
- Promalactis multimaculella
- Promalactis nabokovi
- Promalactis nadezhdae
- Promalactis nataliae
- Promalactis naumanni
- Promalactis nebrias
- Promalactis neixiangensis
- Promalactis noviloba
- Promalactis odaiensis
- Promalactis orphanopa
- Promalactis palawanella
- Promalactis pallidistriata
- Promalactis palmata
- Promalactis papillata
- Promalactis parasuzukiella
- Promalactis parazeucta
- Promalactis parki
- Promalactis parvignatha
- Promalactis parvissima
- Promalactis parvispinata
- Promalactis peculiaris
- Promalactis pentaclosta
- Promalactis polyptycha
- Promalactis polyspina
- Promalactis projecta
- Promalactis proximaculosa
- Promalactis proximipulchra
- Promalactis pulchra
- Promalactis punctuata
- Promalactis pyrochalca
- Promalactis quadratitabularis
- Promalactis quadrilineata
- Promalactis quadriloba
- Promalactis quadrimacularis
- Promalactis quinilineata
- Promalactis ramispinea
- Promalactis raptitalella
- Promalactis rectifascia
- Promalactis recurva
- Promalactis robinsoni
- Promalactis roesleri
- Promalactis rostriformis
- Promalactis rubra
- Promalactis ruficolor
- Promalactis ruiliensis
- Promalactis sakaiella
- Promalactis saligna
- Promalactis scalmotoma
- Promalactis scleroidea
- Promalactis scorpioidea
- Promalactis semantris
- Promalactis serpenticapitata
- Promalactis serrata
- Promalactis similiconvexa
- Promalactis similidierli
- Promalactis similiflora
- Promalactis similinfulata
- Promalactis similipulchra
- Promalactis simplex
- Promalactis sinevi
- Promalactis spatulata
- Promalactis sphaerograpta
- Promalactis spiculata
- Promalactis spinellosa
- Promalactis spiniformis
- Promalactis spinosa
- Promalactis spinosicornuta
- Promalactis spintheritis
- Promalactis splendida
- Promalactis sponsalis
- Promalactis striola
- Promalactis strumifera
- Promalactis subcolacephala
- Promalactis subfalcata
- Promalactis subflagellaris
- Promalactis submentawirella
- Promalactis subsuzukiella
- Promalactis sulawesiella
- Promalactis sumatrana
- Promalactis suzukiella
- Promalactis svetlanae
- Promalactis symbolopa
- Promalactis taibaiensis
- Promalactis tamdaoella
- Promalactis tauricornis
- Promalactis teleuropa
- Promalactis thiasitis
- Promalactis trapezia
- Promalactis tricuspidata
- Promalactis tridentata
- Promalactis trilineata
- Promalactis trispina
- Promalactis uncignatha
- Promalactis uncinata
- Promalactis uncinispinea
- Promalactis unistriatella
- Promalactis varilineata
- Promalactis varilonga
- Promalactis varimorpha
- Promalactis varivalvata
- Promalactis venustella
- Promalactis veridica
- Promalactis vittapenna
- Promalactis vulgaris
- Promalactis wegneri
- Promalactis wonjuensis
- Promalactis xianfengensis
- Promalactis yaeyamaensis
- Promalactis yunnanella
- Promalactis zhejiangensis
- Promalactis zhengi
