= Dikchu =

- Town
- Location in Sikkim, India
- Coordinates: 27.4016°N 88.5238°E
- Country: India
- State: Sikkim
- District: Gangtok

Language
  - Official: Nepali (Gorkha), Lepcha, Limbu, Bhutia, Newari, Rai, Gurung, Mangar, Sherpa, Tamang and Sunwar
- Time zone: UTC+5:30 (IST)
- PIN: 737107
- Vehicle registration: SK
- Lok Sabha: Sikkim Constituency
- Nearest City: Gangtok
- Vidhan Sabha: Tumin Lingee Constituency
- Website: eastsikkim.nic.in

Dikchu is a small town in the Gangtok District of the Indian state of Sikkim. The town lies at the confluence of the Dikchu River with the Teesta River and is the site of the 96 MW Dikchu River Hydroelectric Power Project as well as 510 MW Teesta V Hydroelectric Power Project. Dikchu is the last town of Gangtok District that lies on the North Sikkim Highway connecting Singtam to Chungthang, after crossing the town we enter Mangan District. Small market north of river Dikchu also lies on Mangan District.

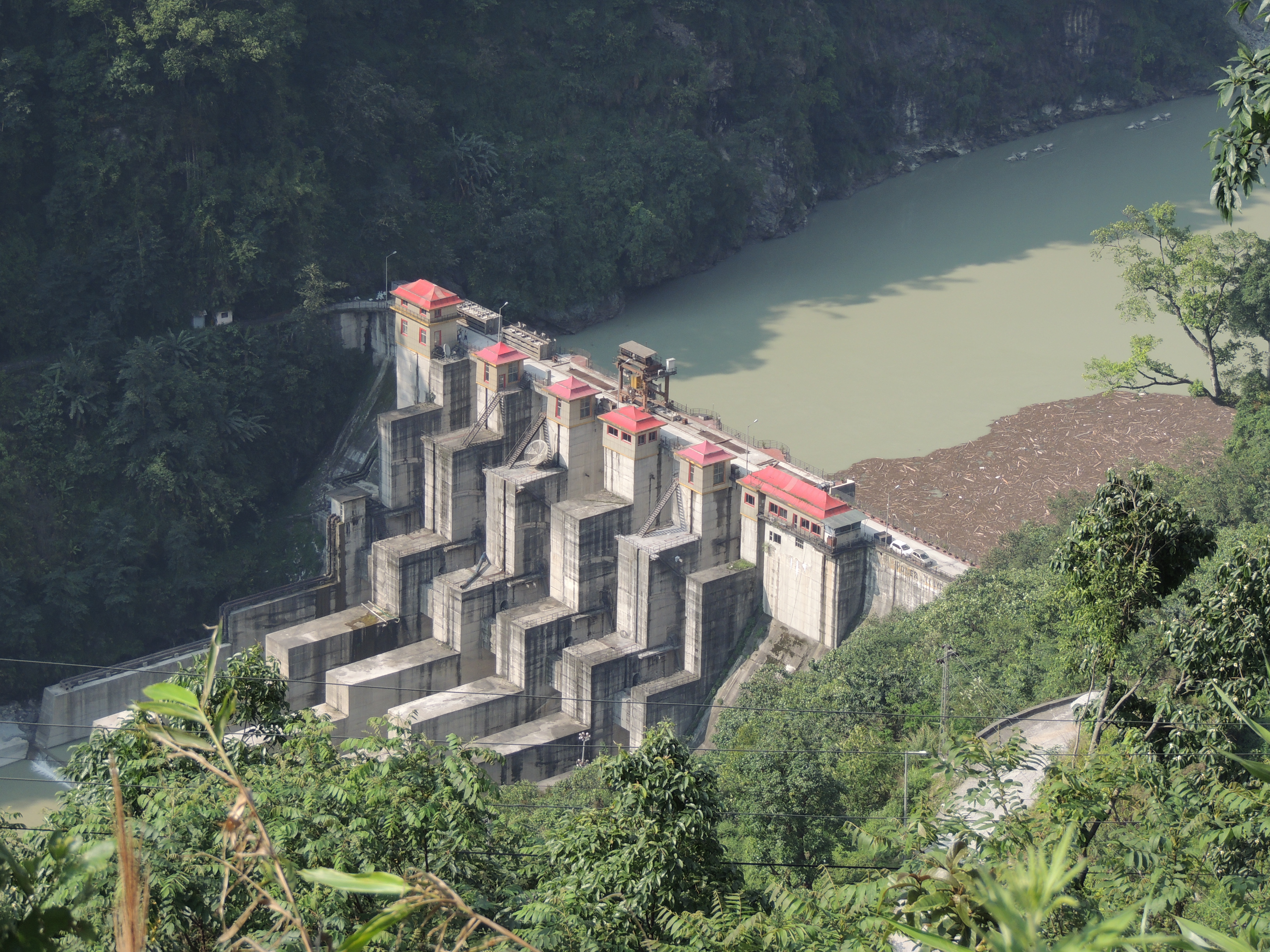
Teesta V Dam, Dikchu, Gangtok District, Sikkim

== Transport ==
The town is well connected to many parts of Sikkim and its neighbouring state West Bengal. Taxi services access Gangtok, Mangan, Chungthang, Singtam, Rangpo, Makha, Ranipool, Lachen, Lachung and Siliguri.

The nearest airport is Pakyong Airport 59 kilometres away. The nearest railway stations are:

- Sevoke Junction 97 kilometres.
- Siliguri Junction 116 kilometres.
- New Jalpaiguri 122 kilometres.

Rangpo railway station is an under construction station 42 kilometres away from the town.

== Geography ==
Located at 27.4016°N 88.5245°E in Gangtok district, topography is hilly with two river belts i.e river Teesta and river Dikchu.

== Climate ==
It has a humid subtropical climate ranging from 2 °C in winter to 30 °C in summer. It is normally dry in winter but rainfall occurs all year round. Monsoon season starts during the second week of June till September which is charactorised by heavy rainfall, landslides and dense fog can disrupt travel during these days. Average rainfall in a year ranges from 2800mm- 3000mm.

== 2023 Sikkim flash floods ==
2023 Sikkim flash floods

== See also ==
- Gangtok District
- Teesta
- Pakyong Airport
