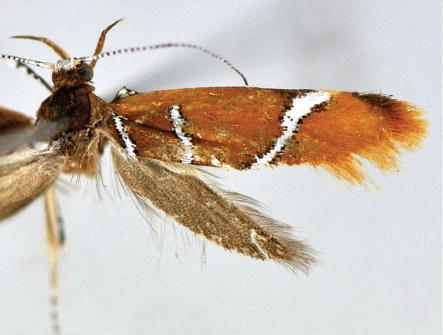

Scientific classification
- Kingdom: Animalia
- Phylum: Arthropoda
- Clade: Pancrustacea
- Class: Insecta
- Order: Lepidoptera
- Family: Oecophoridae
- Genus: Promalactis
- Species: P. quadratitabularis

Binomial name
- Promalactis quadratitabularis Du & Wang, 2013

= Promalactis quadratitabularis =

Species of moth

Promalactis quadratitabularis is a moth of the family Oecophoridae. It is found in Sichuan, China.

The wingspan is about 14–15 mm.
