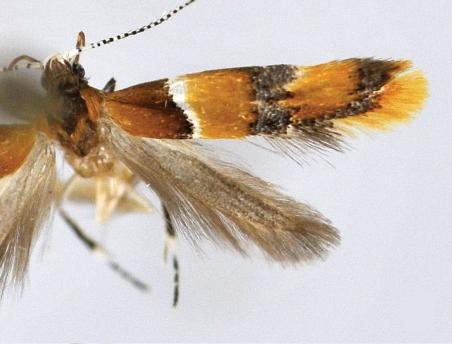

Scientific classification
- Kingdom: Animalia
- Phylum: Arthropoda
- Clade: Pancrustacea
- Class: Insecta
- Order: Lepidoptera
- Family: Oecophoridae
- Genus: Promalactis
- Species: P. dimolybda

Binomial name
- Promalactis dimolybda Meyrick, 1935

= Promalactis dimolybda =

Species of moth

Promalactis dimolybda is a moth of the family Oecophoridae. It is found in Fujian, Hubei, Sichuan and Zhejiang provinces of China.

The wingspan is about 9.5-11.5 mm. The ground colour of the forewings is ochreous yellow. The hindwings and cilia are dark grey.
