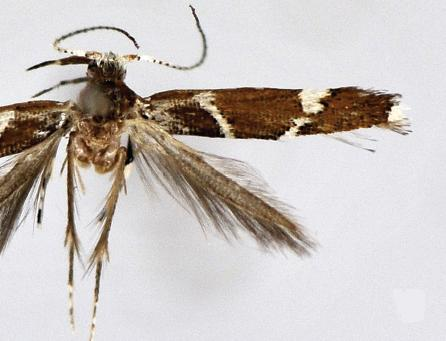

Scientific classification
- Kingdom: Animalia
- Phylum: Arthropoda
- Clade: Pancrustacea
- Class: Insecta
- Order: Lepidoptera
- Family: Oecophoridae
- Genus: Promalactis
- Species: P. spinosicornuta

Binomial name
- Promalactis spinosicornuta Du & Wang, 2013

= Promalactis spinosicornuta =

Species of moth

Promalactis spinosicornuta is a moth of the family Oecophoridae. It is found in the Tibet Autonomous Region of China.

The wingspan is about 9 mm. The forewings are ochreous brown, sporadically with black scales. The markings are white sparsely edged with black scales. The hindwings and cilia are greyish brown.

== Etymology ==
The specific name is derived from Latin spinosus (meaning having spines) and cornutus and refers to the numerous cornuti (horns).
