= Makha, Sikkim =

Town in Sikkim, India

Makha
- Town
- Location in Sikkim, India
- Coordinates: 27.3120°N 88.4590°E
- Country: India
- State: Sikkim
- District: Gangtok

Language
  - Official: Nepali (Gorkha), Lepcha, Limbu, Bhutia, Newari, Rai, Gurung, Mangar, Sherpa, Tamang and Sunwar
- Time zone: UTC+5:30 (IST)
- PIN: 737138
- Vehicle registration: SK 01/ SK 08
- Lok Sabha: Sikkim Constituency
- Nearest City: Gangtok
- Vidhan Sabha: Tumin Lingee Constituency
- Website: eastsikkim.nic.in

Makha is an important town lying on the bank of Teesta River in Gangtok district of Sikkim, India. Makha lies between Singtam and Dikchu.

== Transport ==
The town is well connected to many parts of Sikkim and its neighbouring state West Bengal. Taxi services access Gangtok, Mangan, Chungthang, Singtam, Rangpo, Dikchu, Ranipool, Lachen, Lachung and Siliguri.

The nearest airport is Pakyong Airport 45 kilometres away. The nearest railway stations are:

- Sevoke Junction 90 kilometres.
- Siliguri Junction 103 kilometres.
- New Jalpaiguri 115 kilometres.

Rangpo railway station is an under construction station situated 35 kilometres away from the town.
