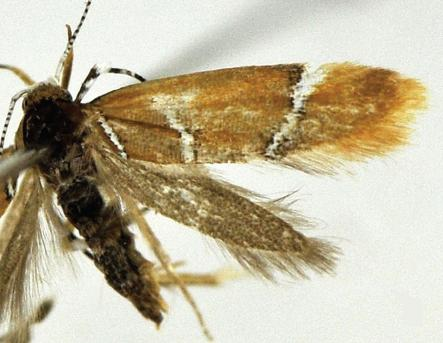

Scientific classification
- Kingdom: Animalia
- Phylum: Arthropoda
- Clade: Pancrustacea
- Class: Insecta
- Order: Lepidoptera
- Family: Oecophoridae
- Genus: Promalactis
- Species: P. papillata

Binomial name
- Promalactis papillata Du & Wang, 2013

= Promalactis papillata =

Species of moth

Promalactis papillata is a moth of the family Oecophoridae. It is found in Anhui and Zhejiang provinces of China.

The wingspan is about 9–12 mm. The forewings are dark orange yellow with white markings edged with black scales. The hindwings and cilia are dark grey.

== Etymology ==
The specific name is derived from Latin papillatus (meaning having papillary process) and refers to the uncus having a small papillary process at the basal two-thirds laterally.
