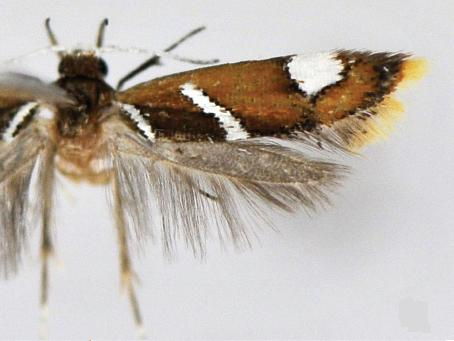

Scientific classification
- Kingdom: Animalia
- Phylum: Arthropoda
- Clade: Pancrustacea
- Class: Insecta
- Order: Lepidoptera
- Family: Oecophoridae
- Genus: Promalactis
- Species: P. strumifera

Binomial name
- Promalactis strumifera Du & Wang, 2013

= Promalactis strumifera =

Species of moth

Promalactis strumifera is a moth of the family Oecophoridae first described by Du and Wang in 2013. It is found in Fujian, Guangdong, Guangxi, Jiangxi and Zhejiang provinces of China.

The wingspan ranges from 8 to 11.5 millimetres (0.31 to 0.45 in). The ground colour of the forewings is ochreous brown tinged with dark ochreous brown, sometimes scattered with black scales on the lower angle of the cell. The hindwings and cilia are grey.

== Etymology ==
The specific name is derived from Latin strumifer (meaning nodular) and refers to the lateral nodular process at the anterior two-fifths of the seventh abdominal segment in the female genitalia.
