= Relli River =

River in India

The Relli, a tributary of Teesta River, is a small Himalayan river in the Indian states of Sikkim and West Bengal, flowing near Kalimpong. The source of the Relli lies in between the Alagara - Lava forest range at an elevation of 2,400 metres (8,000 ft) known as Tiffin Dara and ends at 800 ft, confluence with the Teesta . The river runs less than 10 kilometres (6 mi) from central Kalimpong, separated by Deolo Hill. Fed by its main tributaries, Khani River and Pala River, the Relli flows into the Teesta River about 32 kilometres (20 mi) south of central Kalimpong.

The northerly slopes along the Relli in Upper Echhay Sherpagaon, in Sikkim, are home to a cluster of some 50 Sherpa households. The village of Relli is located on its banks downriver from Kalimpong, connected to the city by road and trails.

== Tourism ==
Rinchingpong, a tourist area situated in the northern part of Kalimpong, overlooks the Relli. The Relli is a popular weekend destination among Kalimpong locals for attractions including local cuisine, picnicking spots, boating, and recreational fishing. A Wayside Inn managed by the West Bengal Tourism Department is located nearby.

A fair is held annually at the Relli on the Makar Sankranti holiday (January 14).

== Historical sites ==
Gompas, or monasteries, lie near the river, with an overlook at Jelep La Viewpoint.

Bhutan House, in West Bengal, also overlooks the Relli River below a deep valley.
