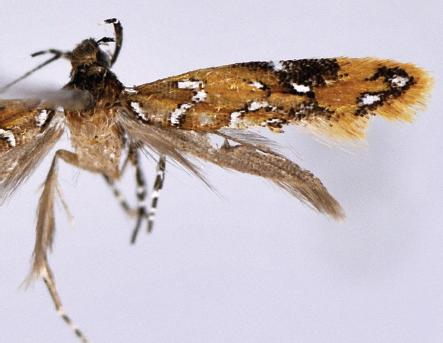

Scientific classification
- Kingdom: Animalia
- Phylum: Arthropoda
- Clade: Pancrustacea
- Class: Insecta
- Order: Lepidoptera
- Family: Oecophoridae
- Genus: Promalactis
- Species: P. ramispinea

Binomial name
- Promalactis ramispinea Du & Wang, 2013

= Promalactis ramispinea =

Species of moth

Promalactis ramispinea is a moth of the family Oecophoridae. It is found in Fujian, Guangdong, Hunan and Jiangxi provinces of China.

== Description ==
The wingspan is about 10–12 mm. The ground colour of the forewings is orange yellow. The costal margin with an inverted triangular black blotch. The hindwings and cilia are dark grey.

== Etymology ==
The specific name is derived from the Latin prefix rami- 'branch' and Latin spineus 'spine-like' and refers to the strong spines in the distal quarter of the cornutus.
