= Matla Setu =

Bridge in India

Matla Bridge
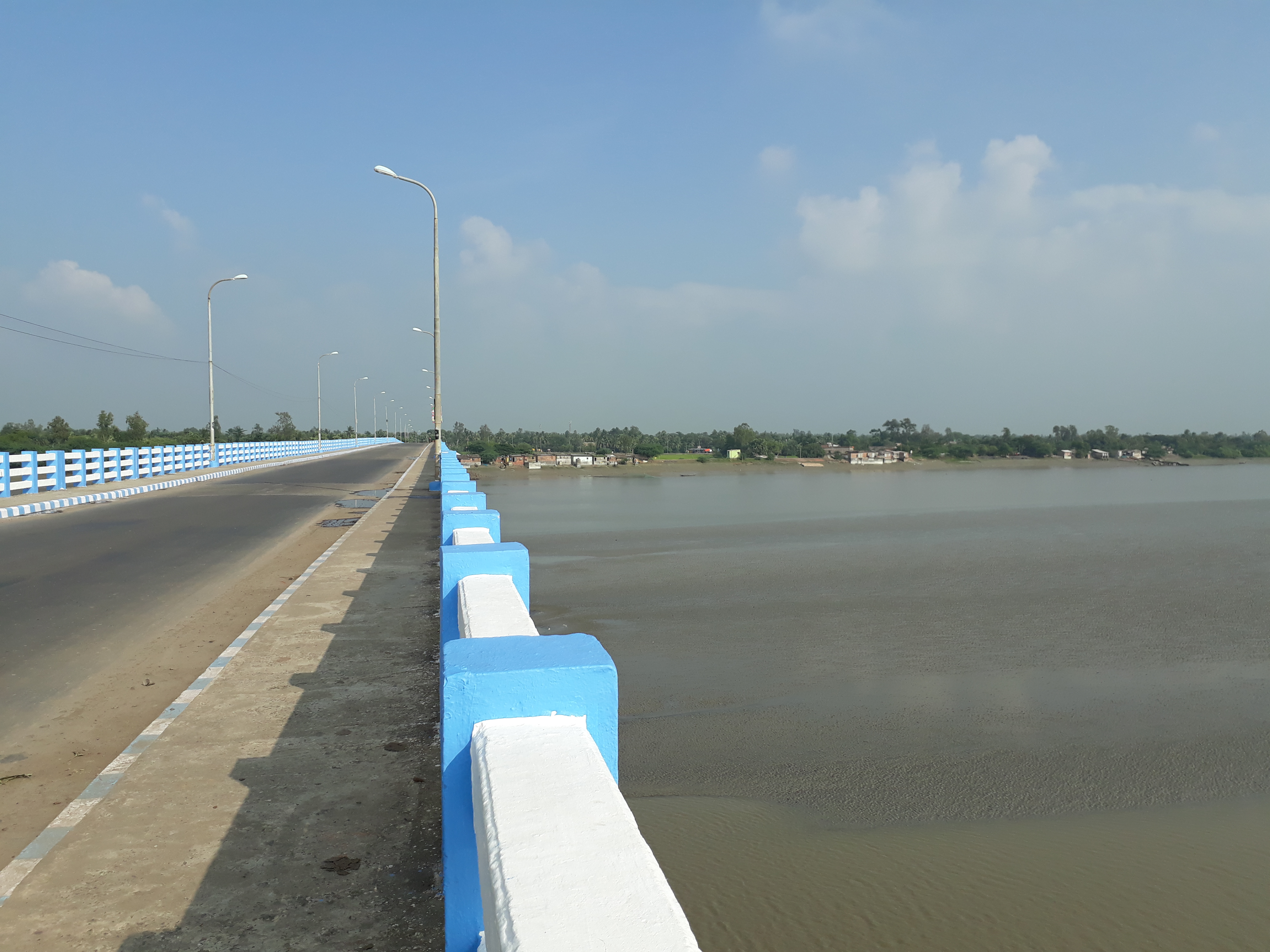
- Matla bridge on Matla river near Canning City
- Coordinates: 22°18′25″N 88°40′40″E
- Carries: Two paths, one way traffic for all the traffic on every way
- Crosses: Matla River
- Locale: Canning, West Bengal, India
- Official name: Matla Setu
- Named for: Matla River

Characteristics
- Total length: 644 metres (2,113 ft)
- Width: 12 metres (39 ft)

History
- Opened: 2011
- Closed: No

Statistics
- Toll: No

Location
- Interactive map of Matla Bridge

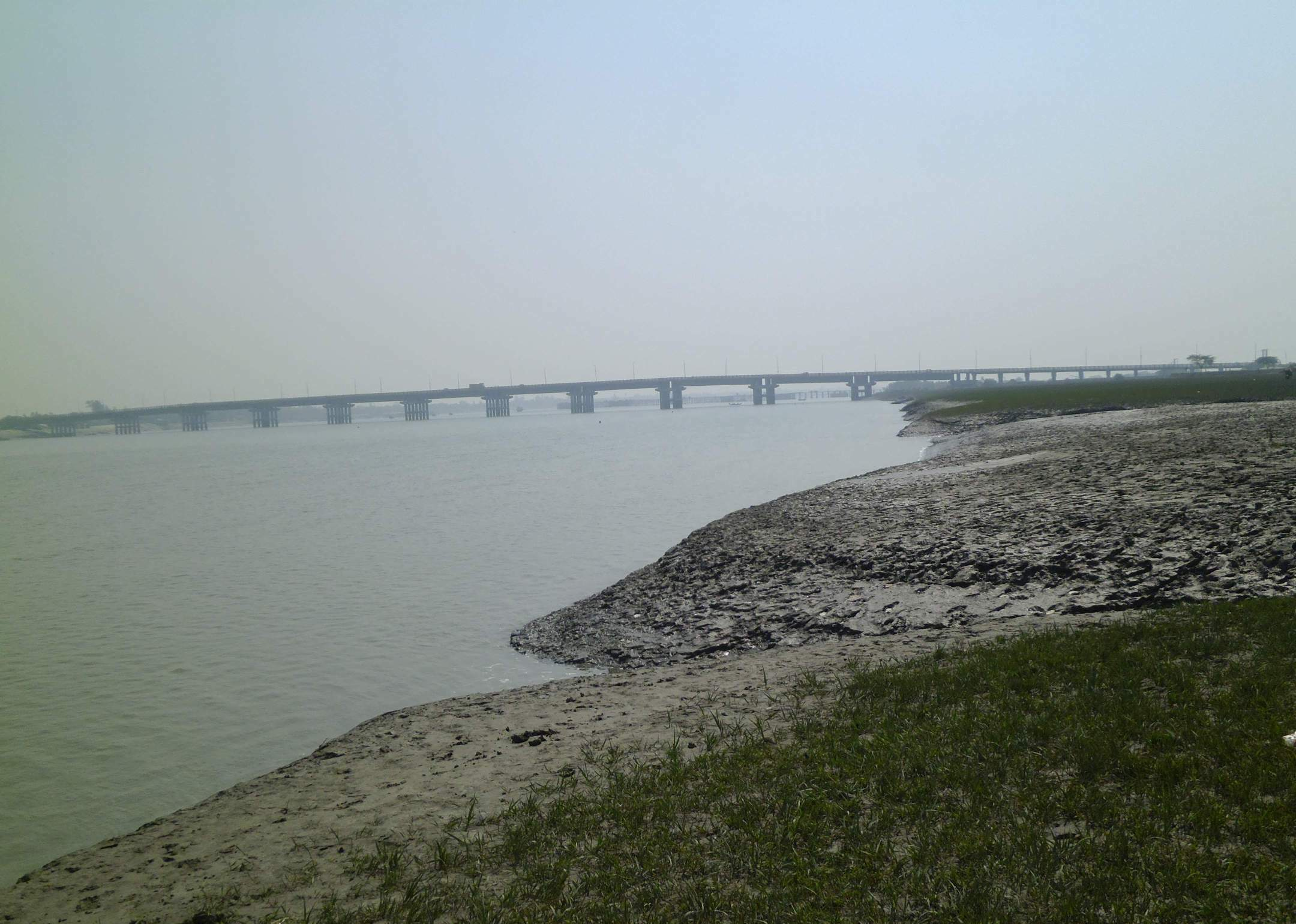
It turns out that the Matla Bridge on Matlara River

Matla Setu is a bridge built on Matla River in West Bengal. The 644 meter–long bridge (2113 feet) was inaugurated by Buddhadeb Bhattacharjee, former Chief Minister of West Bengal, on Matla River in Canning town of Canning Subdivision in January 2011. It is also known as Matla Bridge. It links Canning with Basanti. The bridge is located at 22°18′20″N 88°40′46″E.

== Connection ==
The bridge connects Canning and its tourism center of Jharkhali to the Sundarbans entrance. Since the construction of the bridge, people in the Sundarbans area can easily move to Kolkata and suburban areas by road. Tourists can quickly come to the Sundarbans. As a result, economic development has taken place in the area.

== See also ==
- List of longest bridges in West Bengal
