= Alexander Kellas =

British chemist, explorer, and mountaineer (1868–1921)

- Born: Alexander Mitchell Kellas; 21 June 1868; Aberdeen, Scotland
- Died: June 5, 1921 (aged 52) near Kampa Dzong, Shigatse Prefecture, China
- Cause of death: Asphyxiation
- Occupations: Chemist; explorer; mountaineer

Alexander Mitchell Kellas (21 June 1868 – 5 June 1921) was a British chemist, explorer, and mountaineer known for his studies of high-altitude physiology.

== Biography ==
Kellas was born in Aberdeen, Scotland on 21 June 1868. He was educated at Aberdeen Grammar School, Heriot-Watt College in Edinburgh, and at University College London. There, he obtained a degree in Chemistry and, after graduating, worked as a laboratory assistant for Sir William Ramsay. He then went to Heidelberg University to gain his PhD.

He was a member of the Scottish Mountaineering Club and climbed many peaks in the Cairngorms. In 1907, he organized an expedition to the Pir Panjal Range in the Western Himalayas. In 1911, he returned and climbed Pauhunri and a number of other peaks. Pauhunri was the highest mountain climbed at that date, although Kellas did not know this as its height had been under-estimated.

Himalayan Club Vice President Meher Mehta characterized Kellas' papers A Consideration of the Possibility of Ascending the Loftier Himalaya and A Consideration of the Possibility of Ascending Mt Everest as "key catalysts in driving scientific thinking into climbing big peaks. His studies included the physiology of acclimatization in relationship to important variables like altitude, barometric pressures, alveolar PO2, arterial oxygen saturation, maximum oxygen consumption, and ascent rates at different altitudes. He had concluded that Mount Everest could be ascended by men of extreme physical and mental constitution without supplementary oxygen if the physical difficulties of the mountain were not too great."

== Legacy ==
In 1978, Kellas' suggestion was verified by Reinhold Messner and Peter Habeler when they made the first ascent of Mount Everest without supplemental oxygen. However, Kellas was also one of the earliest scientists to suggest use of supplemental oxygen on high mountains such as Mount Everest; the first ascent of Everest and most subsequent ascents (as well as some ascents of lower peaks) have done so.

Kellas was a noted mountaineer. He had made at least ten first ascents of peaks over 6,100 m (20,000 ft) including Pauhunri, 7,128 m (23,386 ft), in Sikkim, which was the highest peak climbed up to that point, although this was only discovered 80 years later. He reached the summit on 14 June 1911, and this world summit record was only broken in September 1928 with the ascent of Lenin Peak.

Kellas died of a heart attack in 1921 near the village of Kampa Dzong, Tibet, on his way from Sikkim to the first expedition to Everest. He had had only a brief rest of nine days after an arduous expedition to Kabru and was only a day's hike away from seeing Mount Everest for the first time.

== List of mountains first climbed by Kellas ==
- Pauhunri
- Chomo Yummo
