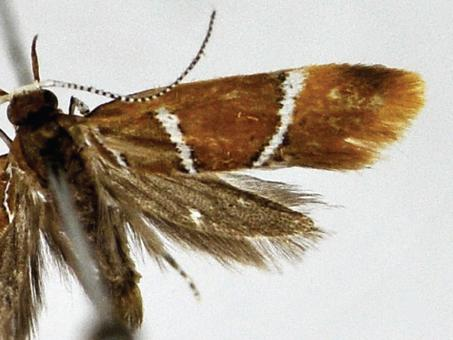

Scientific classification
- Kingdom: Animalia
- Phylum: Arthropoda
- Clade: Pancrustacea
- Class: Insecta
- Order: Lepidoptera
- Family: Oecophoridae
- Genus: Promalactis
- Species: P. scorpioidea

Binomial name
- Promalactis scorpioidea Du & Wang, 2013

= Promalactis scorpioidea =

Species of moth

Promalactis scorpioidea is a moth of the family Oecophoridae. It is found in Jiangxi, China.

The wingspan is about 11.5-13.5 mm. The forewings are ochreous brown to ferrugineous. The costal margin black along the basal quarter. The markings are white edged with black scales. The hindwings and cilia are dark grey.

== Etymology ==
The specific name is derived from Latin scorpioideus (meaning like the tail of a scorpion) and refers to the sacculus curved distally like the tail of a scorpion.
