= Paohanli Peak =

Mountain peak in the border of Tiber and Sikkim

- Paunhuri
- Location within China

Highest point
- Elevation: 7,128 m (23,386 ft)
- Coordinates: 27°56′04″N 88°50′38″E

Geography
- Location: Tibet, China / Sikkim, India

Paohanli Peak or Paunhuri (simplified Chinese: 泡罕里峰; traditional Chinese: 泡罕里峰; Standard Tibetan: ???, is a 7,128-metre-high (23,386 ft) peak at the border of Zarkang, Yadong County, Tibet (China) and Sikkim (India). From the north to the south, near Paohanli Peak there are four peaks with an altitude of over 6,500 m (21,325 ft): Molayi, Tovhenyolu, Qijolabje and Kanchangbinshong.

== See also ==
- List of Ultras of the Himalayas
- Pauhunri
