= Promalactis asymmetrica =

Scientific classification
- Kingdom: Animalia
- Phylum: Arthropoda
- Clade: Pancrustacea
- Class: Insecta
- Order: Lepidoptera
- Family: Oecophoridae
- Genus: Promalactis
- Species: P. asymmetrica

Binomial name
- Promalactis asymmetrica Wang, 2024

Species of moth

Promalactis asymmetrica is a moth of the family Oecophoridae. It is found in Pahang in Malaysia. It was described by Shuxia Wang in 2024. The specific epithet asymmetricus refers to the asymmetrical uncus, gnathos and valva in the male genitalia.

== Description ==
This species has a dark brown tegula and mesonotum. The forewing is ochreous yellow in colour with dense blackish scales from the base to the two-thirds basal. The median fascia is rust brown with a width one-third the length of the forewing. The hindwing and fringe are dark grey in colour. The forelegs and midlegs are black (the midleg is greyish ventrally) and the hindleg is yellowish-brown dorsally and black ventrally.
