= Promalactis indica =

Scientific classification
- Kingdom: Animalia
- Phylum: Arthropoda
- Clade: Pancrustacea
- Class: Insecta
- Order: Lepidoptera
- Family: Oecophoridae
- Genus: Promalactis
- Species: P. indica

Binomial name
- Promalactis indica Wang, 2024

Species of moth

Promalactis indica is a moth of the family Oecophoridae. It is found in the Khasias in India. It was described by Shuxia Wang in 2024. The specific epithet indica refers to India, where this species is found and where the type locality of this species is.

This species is similar to Promalactis binipapillata, however, it can be separated from it based on the shape of the medioapical process and the gnathos in the male genitalia.

== Description ==
This species has a snowy white vertex and a greyish brown frons, with an ochreous brown mesonotum and tegula. The forewings are pale ochreous brown, with white markings edged with black scales. The costal spot is sub-rectangular, extending from the distal two-fifth. The basal streak extends from the dorsum inwards to the base of the fold; the antemedian streak extends from the middle of the dorsum to the basal third of the anterior margin of the cell; and the dorsal streak extends from the distal fourth of the dorsum to the posterior angle of the cell. The apical spot is narrow and rectangular, and the termen has a narrow white stripe interrupted with black scales.

The fringe is ochreous yellow except it is grey around the tornus. The hindwing and its fringe are deep grey in color. The female of this species is unknown.

This species has a snowy white vertex and a greyish brown frons, with an ochreous brown mesonotum and tegula.

The foreleg is black in color except for the femur, which is white ventrally, the tibia which has a white spot at the base and the middle, and the tarsus with the two basal tarsomeres white on the apex. The midleg is white ventrally, but black dorsally; and the tibia has a white line running from the base to the apex. The hindleg is yellow ventrally and white dorsally, with the tibia white at the apex of each tarsomere.
