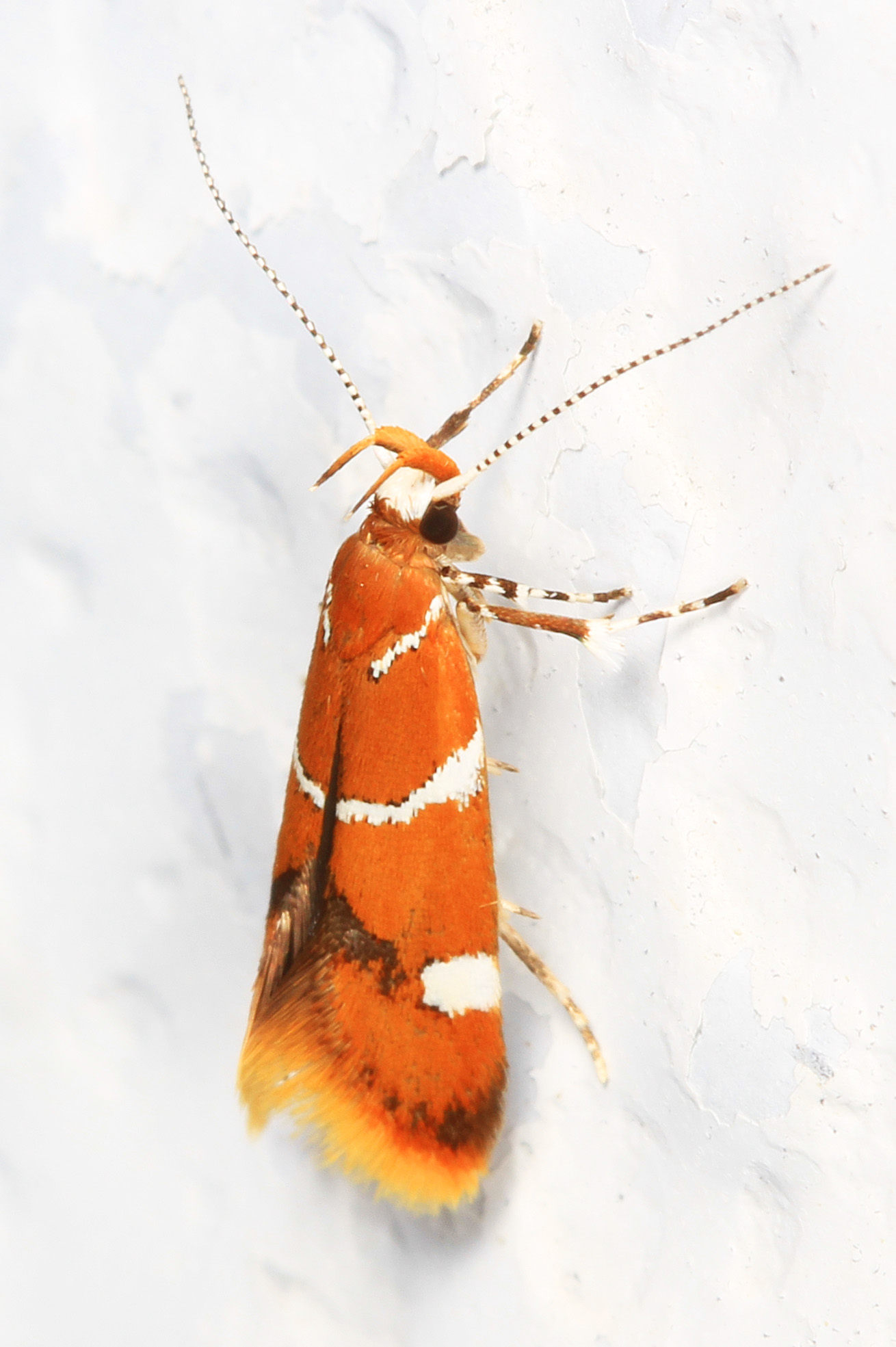
- Suzuki's promalactis moth in Woodbridge, Virginia

Scientific classification
- Kingdom: Animalia
- Phylum: Arthropoda
- Clade: Pancrustacea
- Class: Insecta
- Order: Lepidoptera
- Family: Oecophoridae
- Genus: Promalactis
- Species: P. suzukiella

Binomial name
- Promalactis suzukiella (Matsumura, 1931)

Synonyms
- Borkhausenia suzukiella Matsumura, 1931

= Promalactis suzukiella =

Species of moth

Promalactis suzukiella, Suzuki's promalactis moth, is a moth of the family Oecophoridae. It is native to Korea, Japan and Taiwan, but is an introduced species in the United States. It was originally recorded from the mid-Atlantic states in the early 2000s and by 2020 had expanded its range to encompass Texas and most of the states east of the Mississippi, with the exception of Florida, northern New England and Michigan.

The length of the forewing is 4.5–7 mm. Adults are on wing from March to late September, indicating at least two and possibly more generations per year.

The larvae feed under the bark of rotting logs of Prunus virginiana, Quercus species and Prunus persica.
