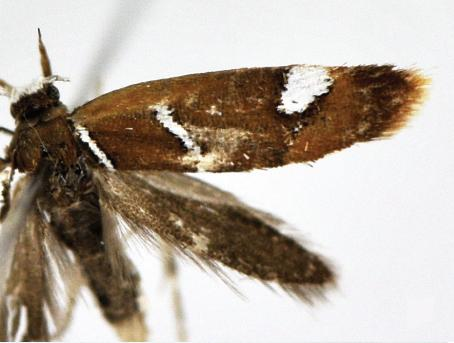

Scientific classification
- Kingdom: Animalia
- Phylum: Arthropoda
- Clade: Pancrustacea
- Class: Insecta
- Order: Lepidoptera
- Family: Oecophoridae
- Genus: Promalactis
- Species: P. albipunctata

Binomial name
- Promalactis albipunctata Park & Park, 1998

= Promalactis albipunctata =

Species of moth

Promalactis albipunctata is a moth of the family Oecophoridae. It is found in Jiangxi province of China and in Korea.

The wingspan is about 11–14 mm.
