= Promalactis subflagellaris =

Scientific classification
- Kingdom: Animalia
- Phylum: Arthropoda
- Clade: Pancrustacea
- Class: Insecta
- Order: Lepidoptera
- Family: Oecophoridae
- Genus: Promalactis
- Species: P. subflagellaris

Binomial name
- Promalactis subflagellaris Wang, 2024

Species of moth

Promalactis subflagellaris is a moth of the family Oecophoridae. It is found in Uthai Thani province in Thailand. It was described by Shuxia Wang in 2024. The specific epithet subflagellaris refers to the similarities between this species and Promalactis flagellaris.

This species is similar to Promalactis flagellaris. It can be distinguished from it by differences in the gnathos of the male genitalia.

The vertex is white, while the frons is brown. The mesonotum and tegula are both rust brown. The forewing is yellow in color. The median fascia is ochreous brown, narrowed to the costal margin, and bordered by black scales. The dorsum has an ochreous brown stripe from the base to the basal fourth of the dorsum.

The forewing fringe is yellow except it is deep grey along the distal part of the costal margin and on the extension of the median fascia. The hindwing and its fringe are grey in color.

The only known record of this species is from Uthai Thani province in Thailand.
