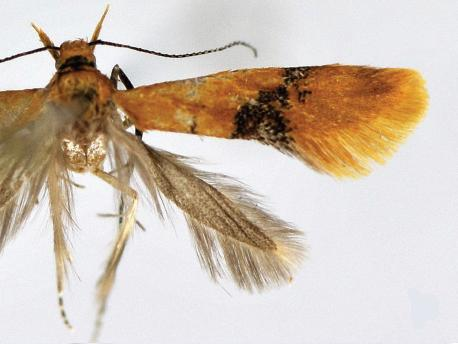

Scientific classification
- Kingdom: Animalia
- Phylum: Arthropoda
- Clade: Pancrustacea
- Class: Insecta
- Order: Lepidoptera
- Family: Oecophoridae
- Genus: Promalactis
- Species: P. flavescens

Binomial name
- Promalactis flavescens Wang, Zheng & Li, 1997

= Promalactis flavescens =

Species of moth

Promalactis flavescens is a moth of the family Oecophoridae. It is found in Shaanxi and Sichuan provinces of China.

The wingspan is about 12.5–14 mm.
