= Promalactis inaequilonga =

Scientific classification
- Kingdom: Animalia
- Phylum: Arthropoda
- Clade: Pancrustacea
- Class: Insecta
- Order: Lepidoptera
- Family: Oecophoridae
- Genus: Promalactis
- Species: P. inaequilonga

Binomial name
- Promalactis inaequilonga Wang, 2024

Species of moth

Promalactis inaequilonga is a species of moth of the family Oecophoridae. It is found in Angola. It was described by Shuxia Wang in 2024. The specific epithet inaequilonga refers the unequal length of the two white lines in the forewing.

P. inaequilonga is similar to Promalactis helminthias but can be distinguished from it by the second white line of the forewing being arched into a V shape in inaequilonga while it is arched into a U shape in helminthias.

== Description ==
The vertex and frons are snowy white in colour. The forewing is yellowish brown and the markings are white edged with black scales. The white line extends from near the base to basal 2/3 of dorsum and then extends along the dorsum to the end of fold, and then extends to the costal spot, forming a V shape. The hindwing and fringe are grey in colour.
