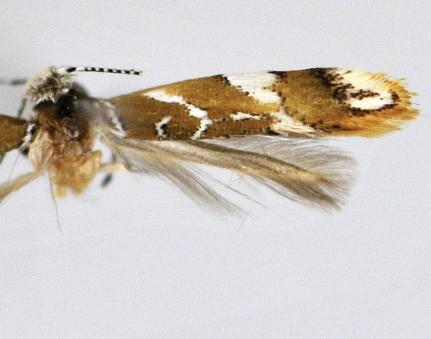

Scientific classification
- Kingdom: Animalia
- Phylum: Arthropoda
- Clade: Pancrustacea
- Class: Insecta
- Order: Lepidoptera
- Family: Oecophoridae
- Genus: Promalactis
- Species: P. quadriloba

Binomial name
- Promalactis quadriloba Du & Wang, 2013

= Promalactis quadriloba =

Species of moth

Promalactis quadriloba is a moth of the family Oecophoridae. It is found in, Guizhou, China.

The wingspan is about 9-9.5 mm. The ground colour of the forewings is yellowish brown with white markings edged with black scales. The hindwings and cilia are grey.

== Etymology ==
The specific name is derived from the Latin prefix quadri- (meaning four) and the suffix -lobus (meaning lobe) and refers to the three apical lobes and the ventral process of the valva.
