= Promalactis robinsoni =

Scientific classification
- Kingdom: Animalia
- Phylum: Arthropoda
- Clade: Pancrustacea
- Class: Insecta
- Order: Lepidoptera
- Family: Oecophoridae
- Genus: Promalactis
- Species: P. robinsoni

Binomial name
- Promalactis robinsoni Wang, 2024

Species of moth

Promalactis robinsoni is a moth of the family Oecophoridae. It is found in Chiang Mai in Thailand. It was described by Shuxia Wang in 2024. It is named after Gaden Sutherland Robinson, who collected the holotype of this species.

== Description ==
This species has a white vertex and frons, and a yellow tegula and mesonotum. The forewing is yellow in color, with three fasciae spread evenly in the basal three-fifths of the wing. The basal fascia extends from the dorsum to the base of the fold, the antemedian fascia extends from the middle of the dorsum to the basal fourth of the costal margin, and the postmedian fascia extends from before the tornus to the basal three-fifth of the costal margin. There is an ill-defined white patch with dense yellow scales. The apical spot is white and very small, and the fringe is yellow with a line of ochreous-yellow scales and sparse black scales from along the termen to the tornus.

The hindwing and its fringe are grey in color.
