= Promalactis latissima =

Scientific classification
- Kingdom: Animalia
- Phylum: Arthropoda
- Clade: Pancrustacea
- Class: Insecta
- Order: Lepidoptera
- Family: Oecophoridae
- Genus: Promalactis
- Species: P. latissima

Binomial name
- Promalactis latissima Wang, 2024

Species of moth

Promalactis latissima is a moth of the family Oecophoridae. It is found in Chiang Mai in Thailand. It was described by Shuxia Wang in 2024. The specific epithet latissima refers to the distally widened uncus of the male genitalia.

== Description ==
This species has a yellowish white vertex and frons, with a pale ochreous brown mesonotum and tegula. The forewing is orange to ochreous yellow in color, with a rust brown basal fascia. The inner margin is edged with a white streak extending from the dorsum to the base of the fold. and the outer margin is edged with a white streak expanded anteriorly. The middle of the wing has an ill-defined greyish black spot, with a large rounded whitish yellow costal spot beyond this. The apical spot is black and is diffused along the termen to the tornus. The fringe is yellow except it is black on the extension of the apical spot to the costal margin. The hindwing and its fringe are grey in color.

== Distribution ==
The only known record of this species is from Chiang Mai in Thailand.
