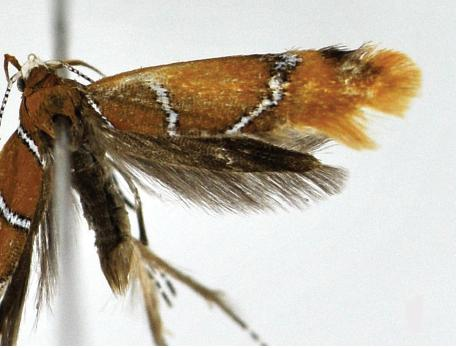

Scientific classification
- Kingdom: Animalia
- Phylum: Arthropoda
- Clade: Pancrustacea
- Class: Insecta
- Order: Lepidoptera
- Family: Oecophoridae
- Genus: Promalactis
- Species: P. bifurciprocessa

Binomial name
- Promalactis bifurciprocessa Du & Wang, 2013

= Promalactis bifurciprocessa =

Species of moth

Promalactis bifurciprocessa is a moth of the family Oecophoridae. It is found in Anhui, China.

The wingspan is about 13.5 mm. The forewings are orange with a narrow white fascia edged with dense black scales. The hindwings and cilia are dark grey.

== Etymology ==
The specific name is derived from Latin bifurcus (meaning bifurcate) and processus (meaning process) and refers to the bifurcate distal process of the left sacculus in the male genitalia.
