= Joyee Setu =

River bridge in West Bengal, India

- Coordinates: 26°20′34″N 88°52′31″E
- Carries: Road vehicles
- Crosses: Teesta River
- Other name: Joyee Bridge
- Owner: Public Works Department, Government of West Bengal

Characteristics
- Material: RCC
- Total length: 2.7 km

History
- Contracted lead designer: SP Singla Constructions Pvt. Ltd.
- Opened: 1 February 2021 (5 years ago)

Statistics
- Toll: None

Location
- Interactive map of Joyee Setu

Joyee Setu or Joyee Bridge is the longest road river bridge of West Bengal which connects Haldibari and Mekhliganj town of Mekhliganj Sub-division in Cooch Behar District of West Bengal. The bridge was opened on 1 February 2021. The bridge is about 2.7 km long and crosses the Teesta River. By the opening of this bridge, the distance between Haldibari and Mekhliganj has been drastically reduced to 15 km from the pre-existing road length of 70 km.

== Specifications ==
The bridge connects Haldibari town and Mekhliganj town, and also connects Haldibari town with Cooch Behar town bypassing Jalpaiguri town. The estimated construction cost for the bridge is Rs 424 crores. There are a total of 78 pillars supporting the structure. Joyee bridge was the longest bridge in West Bengal with a length of 2.7 km. It has an approach road of length 10.974 km and a 0.320 km viaduct, the 14.003 km route reduces the journey between Mekhliganj and Haldibari by 65 km. Its superstructure rests on 64 bored‑well foundations, each 6 m in diameter and sunk to depths of 26.25 m through alluvial strata, with standard spans of 43 m across the river and 32 m for the viaduct sections.

== Foundation and construction ==
The Executing Authority of Joyee Setu was Teesta Bridge construction Division under Public Works Department of West Bengal government. The bridge was constructed by SP Singla Constructions Pvt. Ltd. In August 2015, Chief Minister Mamata Banerjee had laid the foundation of the bridge. On 1 February 2021 the bridge was opened. The bridge is constructed and maintained by West Bengal Public Works Department.

== See also ==
- Howrah Bridge
- Vidyasagar Setu
- Coronation Bridge
