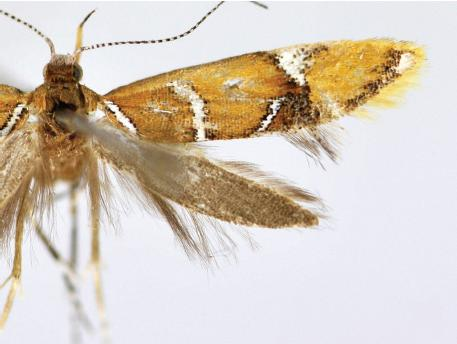

Scientific classification
- Kingdom: Animalia
- Phylum: Arthropoda
- Clade: Pancrustacea
- Class: Insecta
- Order: Lepidoptera
- Family: Oecophoridae
- Genus: Promalactis
- Species: P. dierli

Binomial name
- Promalactis dierli Lvovsky, 2000

= Promalactis dierli =

Species of moth

Promalactis dierli is a moth of the family Oecophoridae. It is found in the Tibet Autonomous Region of China and in Nepal.

The wingspan is about 14.5 mm.
