= Pauhunri =

Mountain in China/India

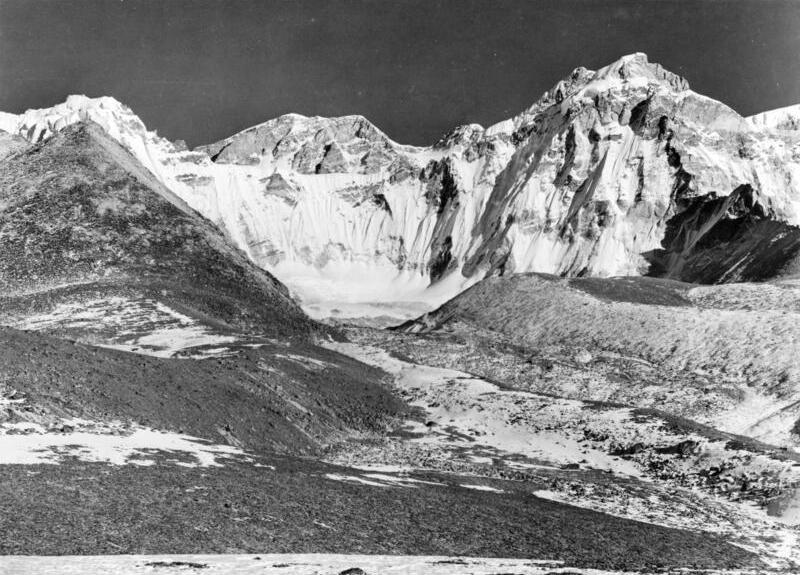
- Pauhunri (centre background) from the headwaters of the Lachung River south of the pass Dongkya La

Highest point
- Elevation: 7,128 m (23,386 ft)
- Prominence: 2,035 m (6,677 ft)
- Listing: Mountains of China; Mountains of India; Ultra
- Coordinates: 27°57′12″N 88°50′33″E

Geography
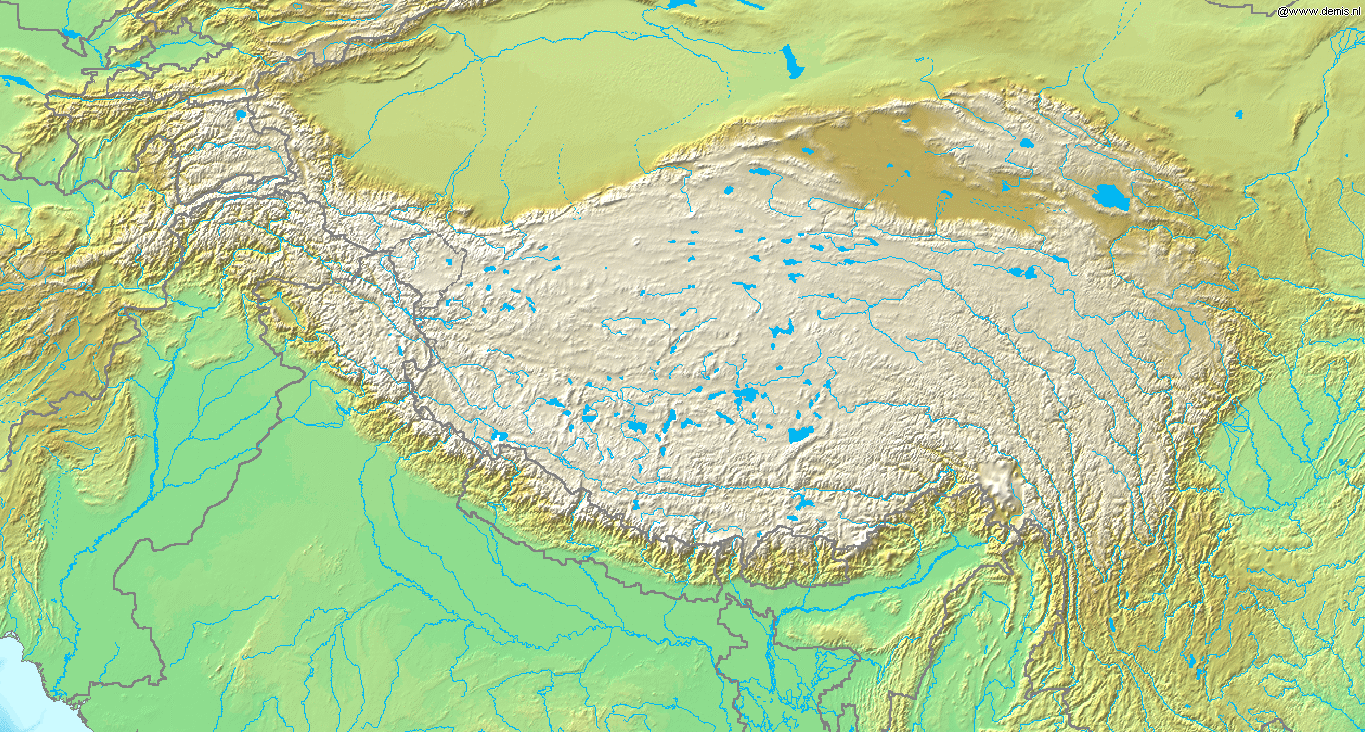
- Location within Tibetan Plateau
- Location: Sikkim, India / Tibet, China
- Parent range: Himalayas

Climbing
- First ascent: 1911 by Alec Kellas
- Easiest route: snow/ice/rock climb

Pauhunri is a mountain in the Eastern Himalayas. It is located on the border of Sikkim, India and Tibet, China and is situated about 75 km northeast of Kangchenjunga. It marks the origin of the Teesta River.

== First ascents ==
Pauhunri has an elevation of 7,128 metres (23,386 ft) and was first climbed in 1911 by Scottish mountaineer, Alexander Mitchell Kellas, along with two Sherpas known only as "Sony" and "Tuny’s brother". Unknown at the time, it was recognised many years later that this climb made Pauhunri the highest climbed summit on Earth from 1911 to 1928.

The summit was then reached by the English mountaineer Wilfrid Noyce in September 1945. In June 1949, the third ascent was achieved by the Frenchman Robert Walter, headmaster of Calve College in Pondicherry. (Due to his medical knowledge, he is often referred to as a doctor in contemporary writing.) His wife Madeleine accompanied him as far as base camp. Walter wrote about his experiences in an article for the journal La Montagne. In June 1951, he successfully reached the summit of Trisul, with Sherpa Nyima Tensing. As a result of his Pauhunri and Trisul climbs, Walter became a member of the Groupe de Haute Montagne in 1954, sponsored by Maurice Herzog and Robert Tézenas du Montcel.

== See also ==
- List of ultras of the Himalayas
- Paohanli Peak
