= Teesta River =

River in India and Bangladesh

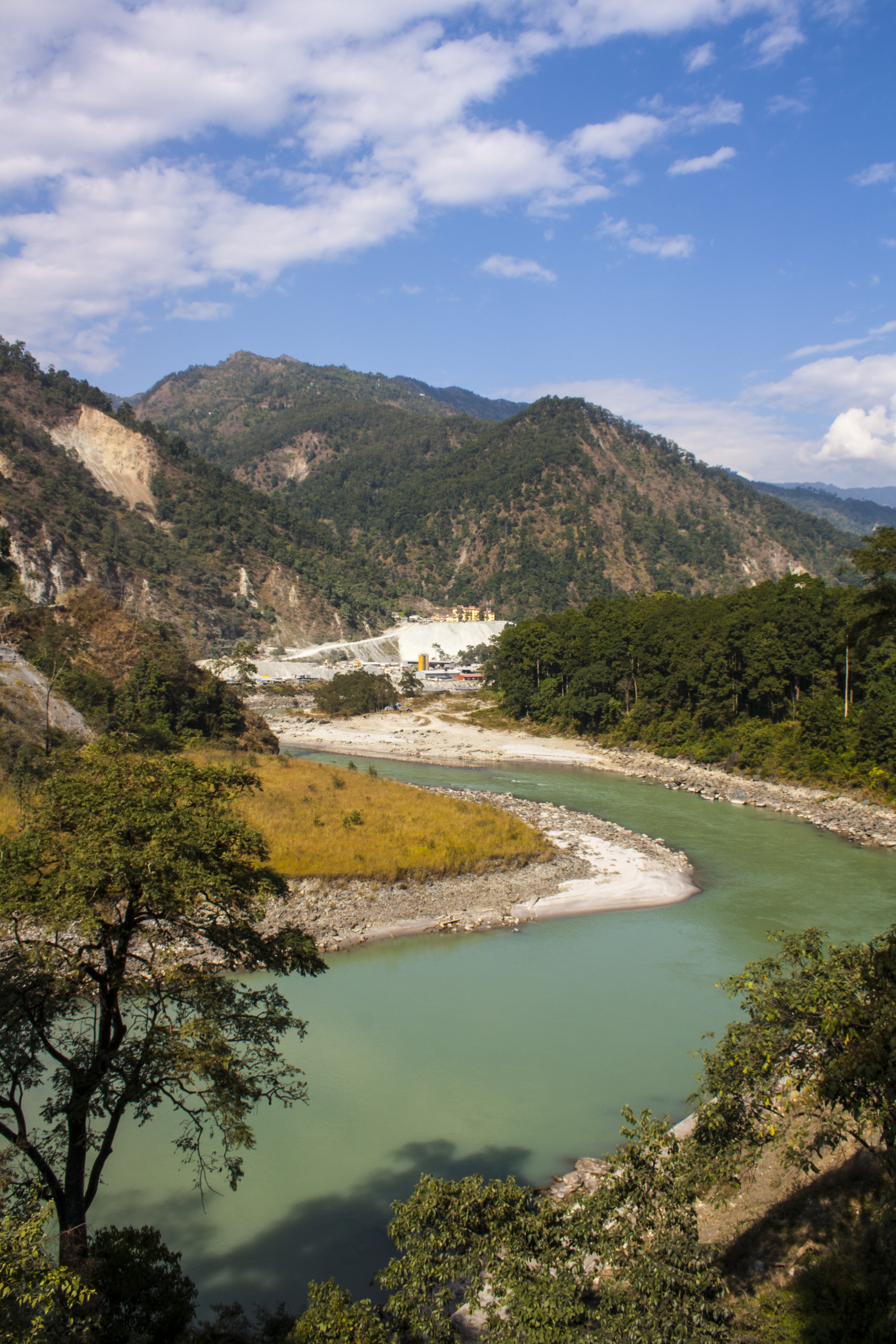
- Teesta in Sikkim

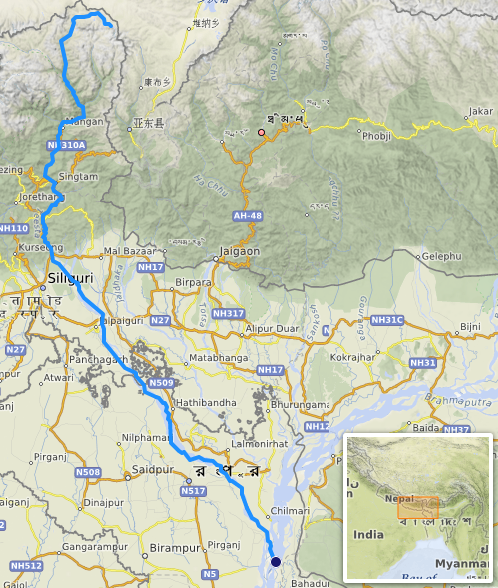
- Path of the Teesta

Location
- Country: India; Bangladesh
- States: Sikkim, India; West Bengal, India; Rangpur, Bangladesh
- Important Bridges: Chungthang Teesta Bridge; Sirwani Teesta Bridge; Indreni Bridge; Rangpo Teesta Bridge; Melli Teesta Bridge; Tista Bazaar Bridge; Coronation Bridge; Sevoke Railway Bridge; Joyee Setu; Jalpaiguri Teesta Bridge
- District's: Mangan District; Gangtok District; Pakyong District; Kalimpong district; Darjeeling district; Cooch Behar district; Jalpaiguri district; Rangpur District; Kurigram District; Nilphamari District; Gaibandha District; Lalmonirhat District
- Towns & Cities: Chungthang; Mangan; Dikchu; Singtam; Rangpo; Kalimpong; Jalpaiguri; Mekhliganj; Haldibari; Rangpur; Lalmonirhat

Physical characteristics
- Source: Pauhunri, Zemu Glacier, Gurudongmar Lake, Tso Lhamo Lake
  - location: Sikkim, India
  - elevation: 7,128 m (23,386 ft)
- Mouth: Jamuna River
  - location: Phulchhari Upazila, Gaibandha, Bangladesh
  - coordinates: 25°30′20″N 89°39′57″E
- Length: 414 km (257 mi)
- Basin size: 12,540 km^{2} (4,840 sq mi)

Basin features
- Tributaries
  - left: Rangpo River; Lachung River; Ranikhola; Relli River; Talung River; Dik Chhu; Lang Lang Chu
  - right: Rangeet River; Kanaka River; Ringyong Chhu; Ranghap Chhu

Teesta River (Limbu: ᤋᤡᤘᤠ᤺, Teewaa; in Classical Limbu) is a 414 km (257 mi) long river that rises in the Pauhunri Mountain of eastern Himalayas, flows through the Indian states of Sikkim and West Bengal and subsequently enters Bangladesh through Rangpur division. In Bangladesh, it merges with Jamuna River which after meeting some other major rivers of the Bengal delta finally falls into the Bay of Bengal. It drains an area of 12,540 km^{2} (4,840 sq mi). In India, the Teesta River flows through Mangan District, Gangtok District, Pakyong District, Kalimpong district, Darjeeling District, Jalpaiguri District, and Cooch Behar District as well as the cities of Rangpo, Jalpaiguri, and Mekhliganj. In Bangladesh, it flows through Lalmonirhat District, Rangpur District, Kurigram District and Gaibandha District. It joins the Jamuna River at Phulchhari Upazila in Bangladesh. 305 km (190 mi) of the river lies in India and 109 km (68 mi) in Bangladesh. The Teesta is the largest river of Sikkim and second largest river of West Bengal after the Ganges.

== Course ==
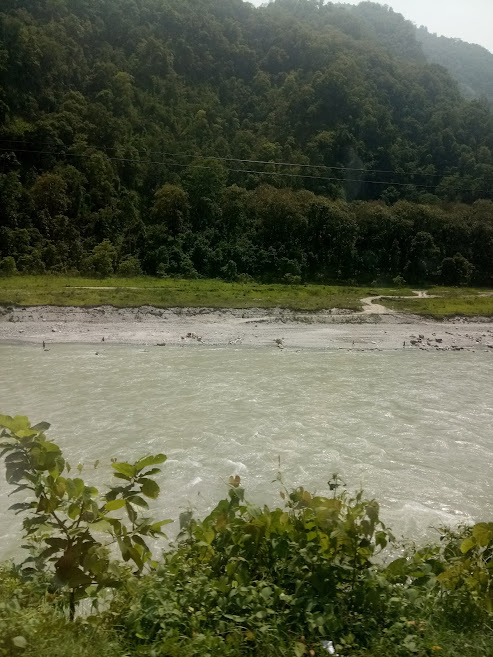
Teesta River near Gangtok

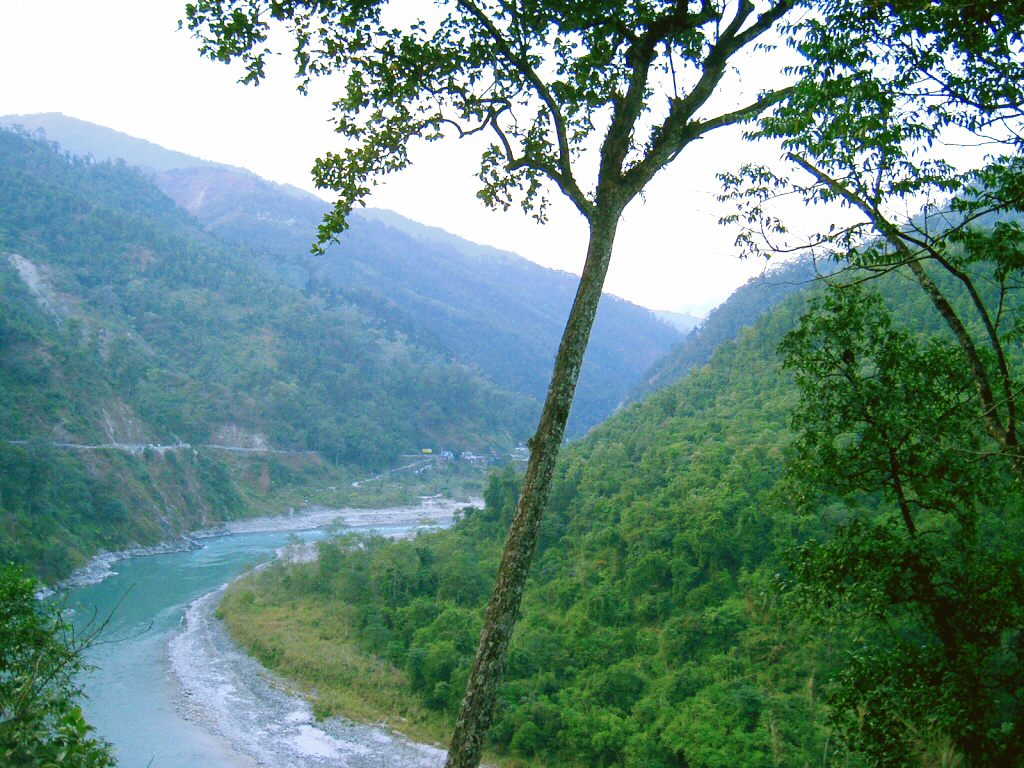
National Highway 10 winds along the banks of the Teesta River near Kalimpong

The Teesta River originates from Teesta Khangtse Glacier, west of Pahunri (or Teesta Kangse) glacier above 5,400 m (17,700 ft), and flows southward through gorges and rapids in the Sikkim Himalaya.

It is fed by streams from Tso Lhamo Lake, Gurudongmar Lake and rivulets arising in the Thangu Valley, Yumthang Valley of Flowers, Dikchu and Donkha mountain ranges. The river then flows past the towns of Chungthang, Singhik, Mangan, Dikchu and Makha, where some major tributaries like Kanaka river join it, and reaches Singtam, where it is spanned by the scenic Indreni Bridge. Also in Singtam, a large tributary of the Teesta called Ranikhola joins and then descends towards Bardang, Majitar, Mining where it is spanned by Rangpo - Mining Teesta Bridge and reaches the city of Rangpo where Rangpo River, the second largest tributary of the Teesta joins. From here river Teesta forms the border between Sikkim and West Bengal up to Teesta Bazaar via Melli. Just before the Teesta Bridge, where the roads from Kalimpong and Darjeeling join, the river is met by its largest tributary, the Rangeet River.

After this point, Teesta River changes its course southwards flowing into West Bengal and some more tributaries like Relli River, Riyang River, Geil Khola etc joins. Than the river hits the plains at Sevoke, 22 km (14 mi) northeast of Siliguri, where it is spanned by the Coronation Bridge and Sevoke Railway Bridge linking the northeast states to the rest of India. After crossing Sevoke, the river is fed by some small tributaries like Chel Khola, Neora Khola, Leesh Khola etc, and then reaches Gajoldoba where there is Teesta Barrage. The river then flows through Jalpaiguri, where Jalpaiguri Teesta Bridge links Northeastern States. The river flows further down through Mekhliganj and Haldibari in Cooch Behar district, where it is spanned by Joyee Setu, the longest roadway bridge of West Bengal with length 3.8 kilometres.

Here the Teesta completes its journey in India and enters Bangladesh in Dahagram, Rangpur Division. The river descends towards Barakhata, where there is Teesta Barrage of Bangladesh. Further it reaches Rangpur and Lalmonirhat town in Lalmonirhat District and Nilphamari District. After crossing Tepamadhupur Bazaar, Nagrakura Bazaar, Sundarganj and Bozra Bazaar, river Teesta joins Brahmaputra River at Haripur Port near Gaibandha, Phulchhari Upazila in Kurigram District of Bangladesh.

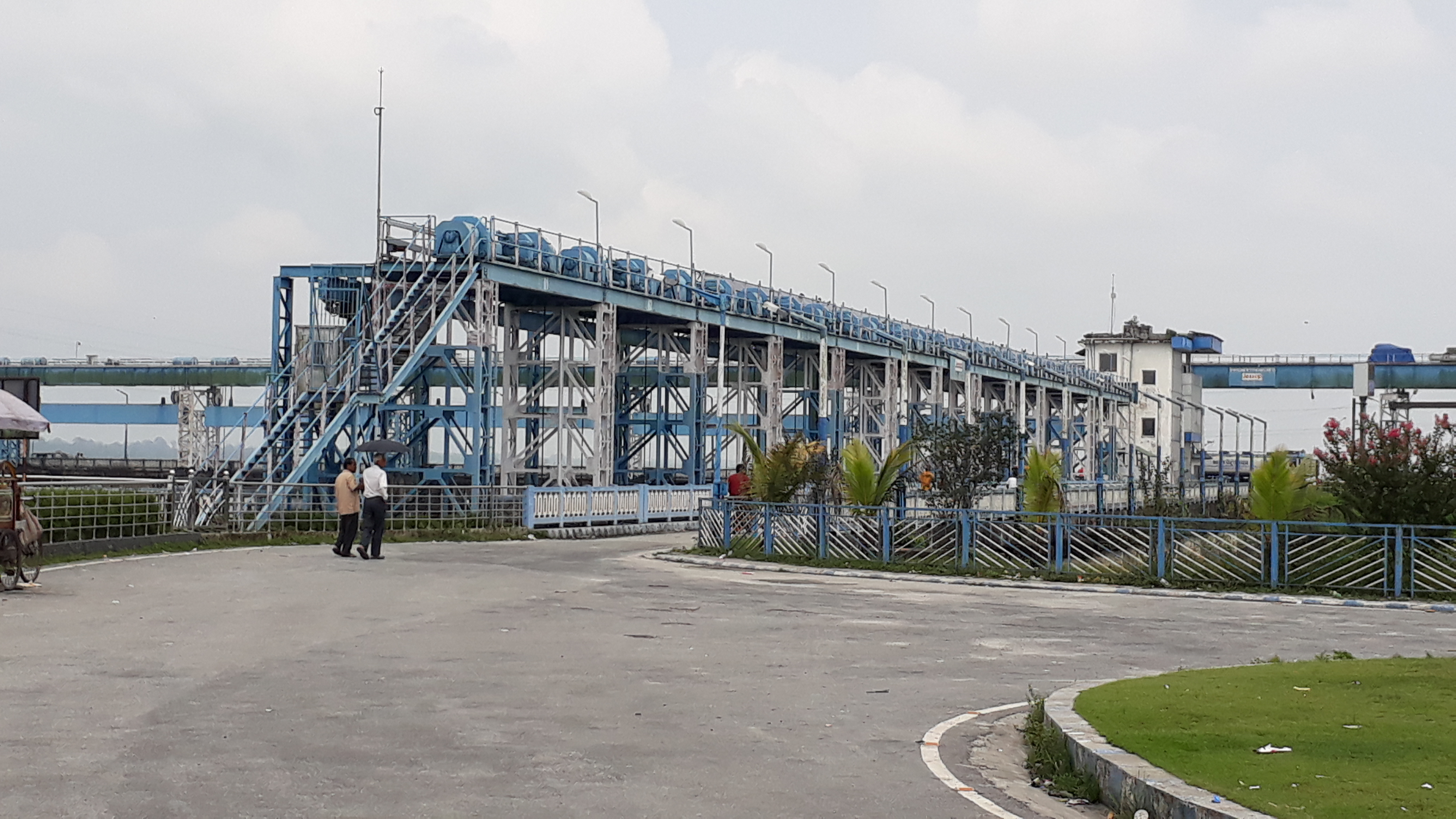
Gajoldoba Barrage on Teesta River

== Geography ==
Through its course, the Teesta River has carved out ravines and gorges in Sikkim meandering through the hills with the hill station of Kalimpong lying just off the river and the city of Siliguri at the foothills of Himalaya. Variegated vegetation can be seen along this route. At lower elevations, tropical deciduous trees and shrubs cover the surrounding hills; alpine vegetation is seen at the upper altitudes. The river is flanked by white sand which is used by the construction industry in the region. Large boulders in and around the waters make it ideal for rafting.

During the monsoon, Teesta River distends its banks, both in size and turbulence. Landslides in this region often dam up parts of the river in this season. It has also caused severe flooding, multiple times during monsoon in Bangladesh.

== Changes in course of rivers ==
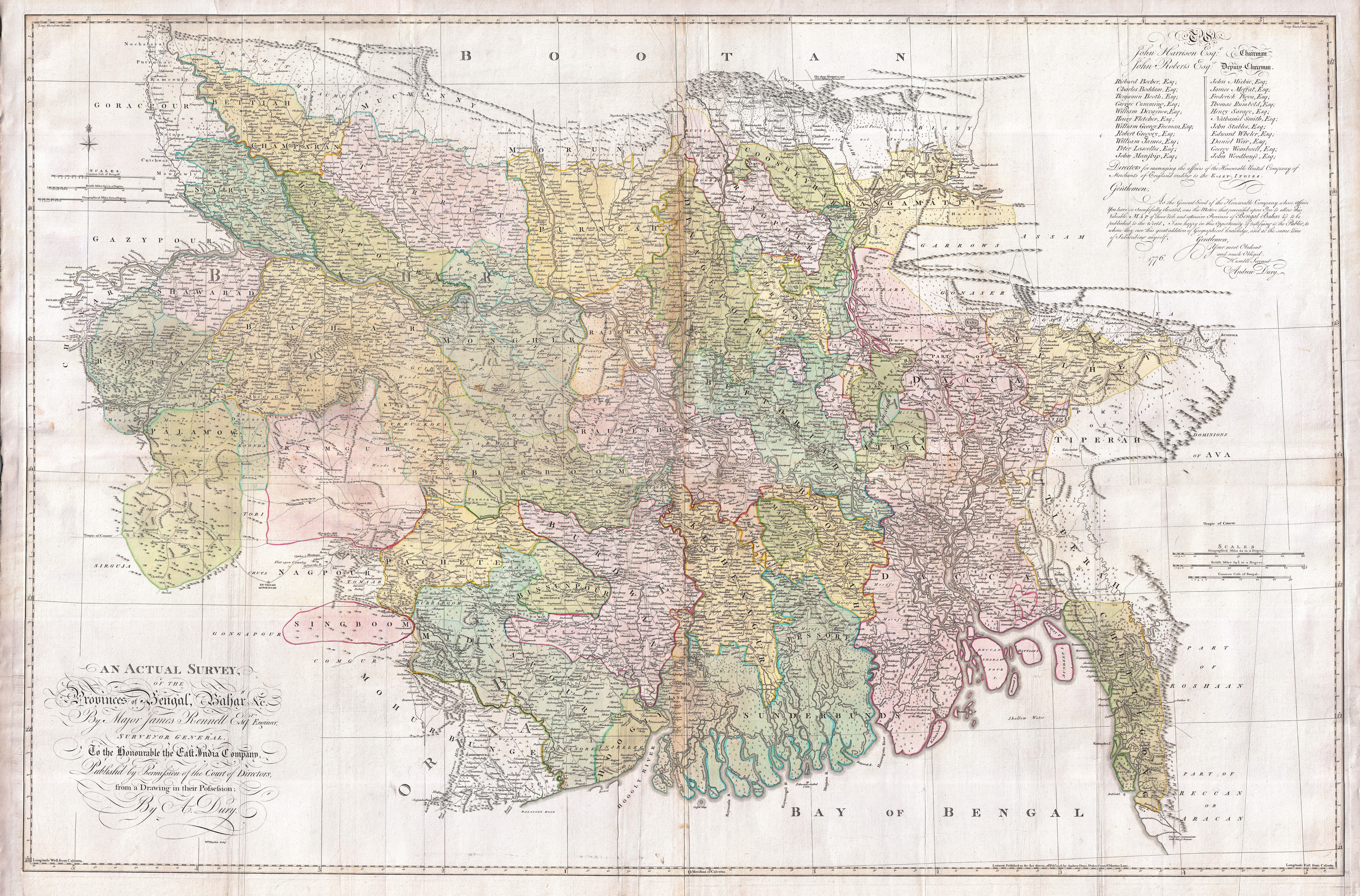
James Rennell's 1776 map shows an earlier flow of the Teesta meeting the Ganges in three channels before a devastating flood in 1787 changed its course.

In the past, the Teesta flowed south from Jalpaiguri in three channels: the Punarbhaba, Atrai and Karatoya Rivers. The Teesta changed course as a result of the flooding of 1787, turning southeast to become part of the Brahmaputra.

== Hydroelectric projects and barrages ==
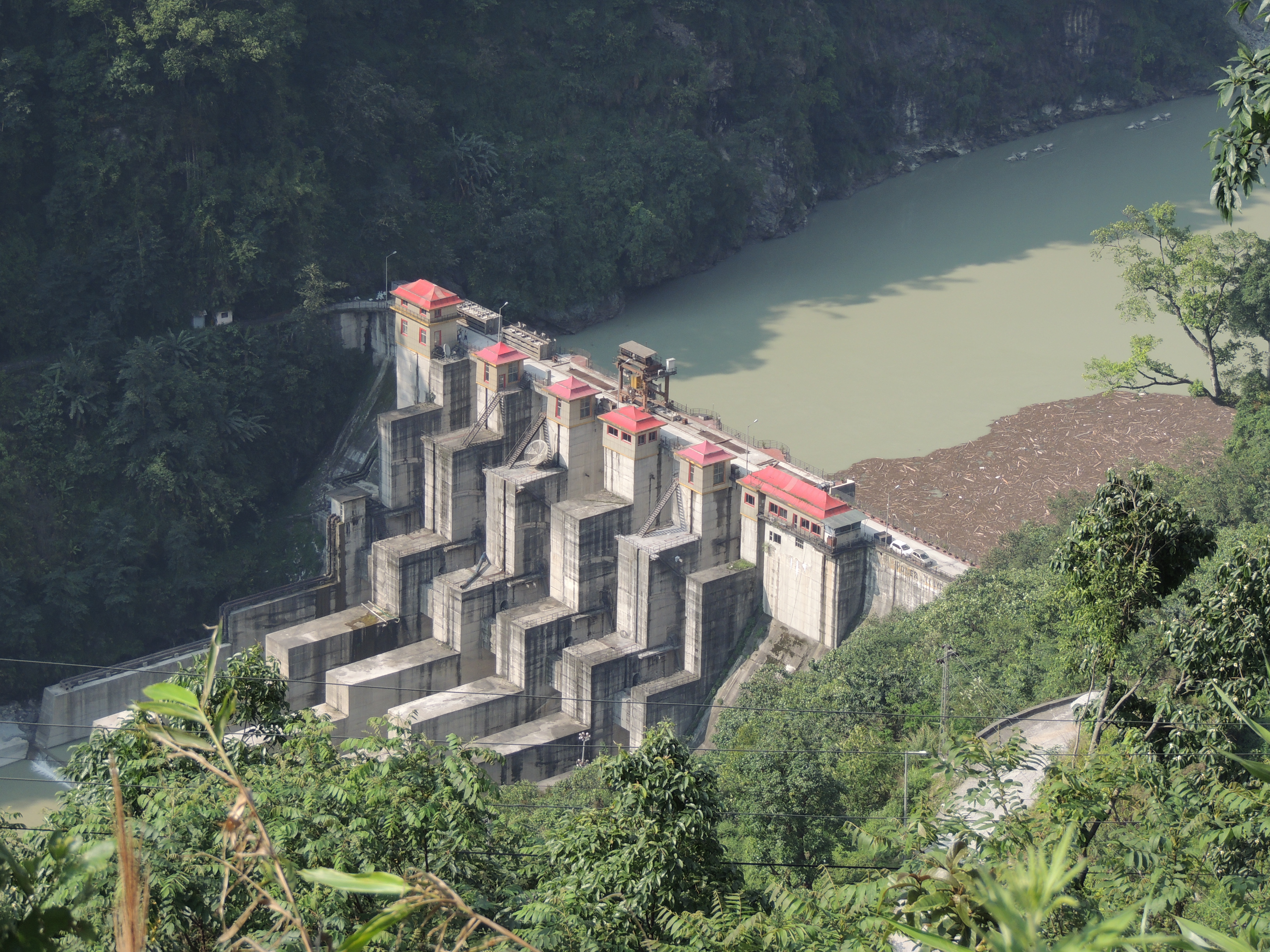
Hydel project on the Dikchu, a tributary of Teesta

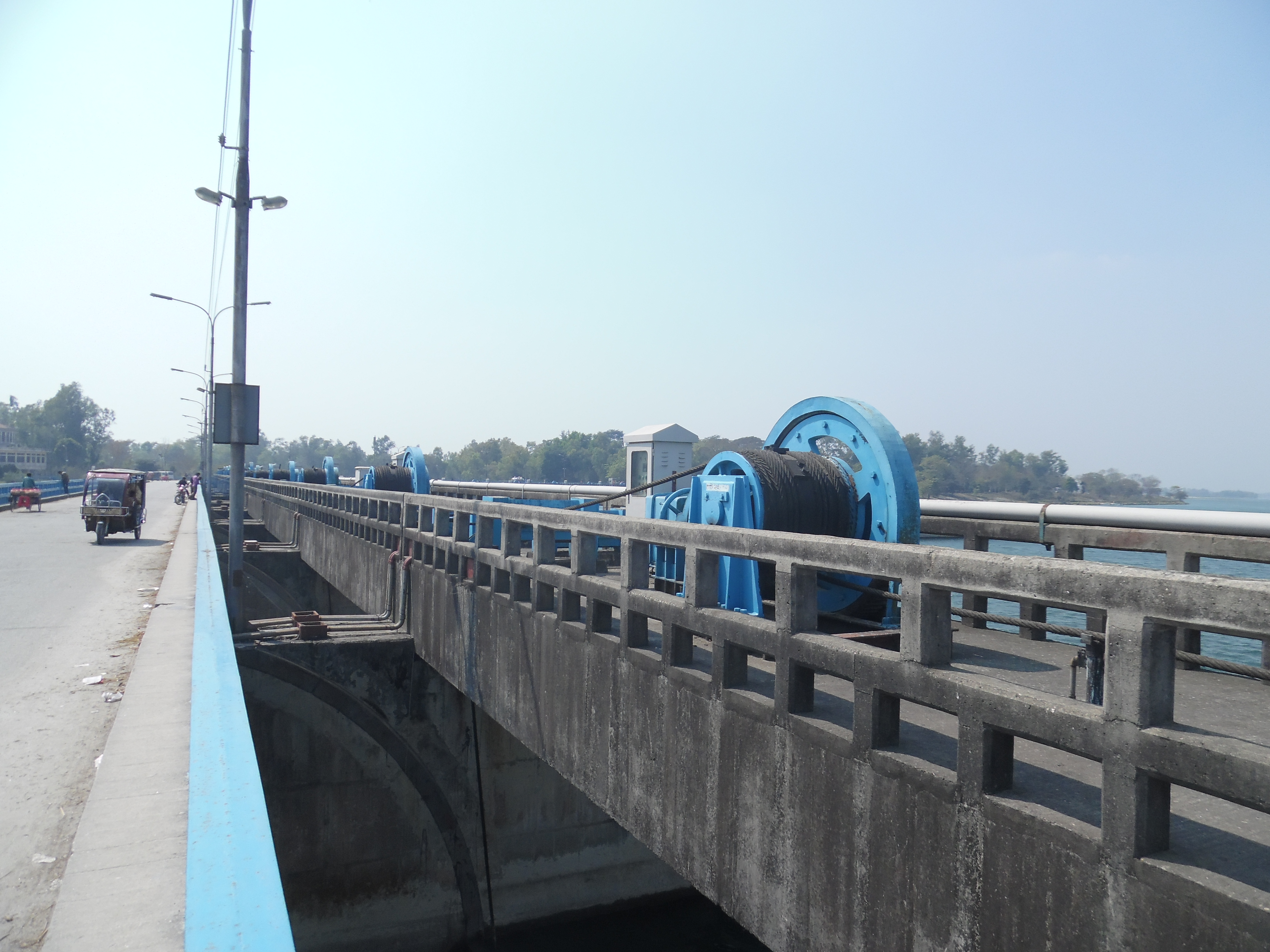
The Teesta Barrage is a major irrigation project in Bangladesh, in Lalmonirhat District. Construction started 1979 and was completed in 1997–98.

India has an estimated total hydroelectric power potential of 84 GW at 60% load factor. Of this, Sikkim's potential share is 2.9%, or about 4.29 GW.

The successfully completed major projects and dams of Teesta River System are as follows:

- Teesta -V Dam: Output - 510 MW, Dam Location - Dikchu, Gangtok district, Sikkim. Powerhouse Location - Balutar, Singtam, Gangtok district, Sikkim. Constructed by - NHPC Limited
- Teesta III Dam: Output - 1200 MW Dam Location - Chungthang, Mangan district, Sikkim. Powerhouse Location - Singhik, Mangan district, Sikkim. Constructed by - Teesta Urja Limited. On 4 October 2023, heavy rains caused a glacial lake outburst flood. The flood reached the Teesta III Dam at midnight, before its gates could be opened, destroying the dam in minutes.
- Teesta Low Dam III: Output - 132 MW, Dam & Powerhouse location - Rambi Bazar, Kalimpong district, West Bengal Constructed by - NHPC Limited.
- Teesta Low Dam IV: Output- 160 MW, Dam & Powerhouse Location - Kalijhora, Kalimpong district, West Bengal Constructed by - NHPC Limited.
- Teesta Barrage - Location - Gajoldoba, Jalpaiguri district, West Bengal
- Barakhata Teesta Barrage - Location: Goddimari, Barakhata, Nilphamari District, Bangladesh.
- Teesta VI Dam: Output: 500 MW, Dam Location: Sirwani, Singtam, Gangtok district, Sikkim. Powerhouse Location: Pamphok, Namchi district, Sikkim. Constructed by - NHPC Limited& Lanco Infratech Limited.
- Rangit III Dam: On Greater Rangeet River which is a tributary of Teesta River. Output: 60 MW, Location: Legship, Gyalshing district, Sikkim. Constructed by NHPC Limited
- Gati Hydropower Project: A 110 MW Gati Hydropower Project lies on River Rangpo, a tributary of River Teesta. Location - Between the town of Rorathang and Rongli of Pakyong District in Sikkim Constructed by - Gati Hydropower Limited.
- Dikchu River Hydroelectric Power Project: Output: 96 MW on Dikchu River, tributary of River Teesta, Location - Dikchu, Gangtok district, Sikkim. Constructed by- Sneha Kinetic Power Projects Pvt. Ltd.
- Madhya Bharat Power Corporation Limited: on Ranikhola, a tributary of Teesta, Output: 96 MW Dam location- Ranipool, Gangtok district, Sikkim. Powerhouse Location- Kumrek, Pakyong district, Sikkim.

The other three completed projects are significantly smaller and minor—Lower Lagyap, Upper Rongni Chhu and Mayang Chhu projects.

== Water sharing challenge ==
Disputes over the appropriate allocation and development of the water resources of the river have remained a subject of conflict between India and Bangladesh for almost 35 years, with several bilateral agreements and rounds of talks failing to produce results.

Negotiations have been going on since 1983. In 1983, a temporary arrangement was reached: Bangladesh would receive 36%, India 39% while, and the remainder would remain unallocated. Both countries signed a water sharing treaty in 1996 which would look into water sharing between the two countries in general following the Ganges water dispute. The water sharing remains a challenge.

In recent developments, Bangladesh's interim government water advisor, Syeda Rizwana Hasan, told news agency PTI (Press Trust of India) on September 1, 2024, that both upper and lower riparian countries must follow international water-sharing principles. If a treaty remains out of reach, it could mark a significant shift in India-Bangladesh relations if diplomacy fails.

== Seismic concerns ==
Teesta River area is in the seismically active Zone-V and has experienced micro-seismic activity. According to India's Ministry of Environment & Forests, the Teesta River dam projects have been approved with the requirement that they adopt suitable seismic coefficient in the design for the dam, tunnel, surge shaft and power house. The projects are cascaded over the length of the river, do not store large amounts water, have small reservoirs, and therefore the projects are expected to have very low risk from the reservoir induced seismicity in the area.

== Climate and tectonics ==
The Teesta River has preserved good imprints of climatic and tectonics along its valleys and catchments. The interrelationship between climate, erosion, deposition and tectonic activities is not properly understood to date. These are being studied.

== See also ==
- Jaldhaka River
- Teesta Water Dispute
