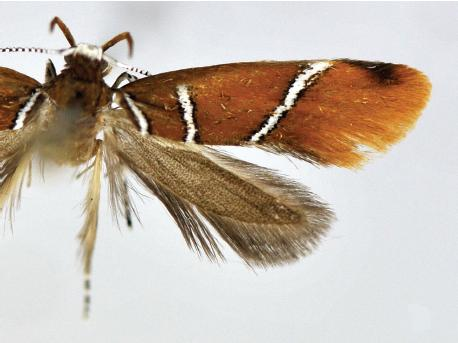

Scientific classification
- Kingdom: Animalia
- Phylum: Arthropoda
- Clade: Pancrustacea
- Class: Insecta
- Order: Lepidoptera
- Family: Oecophoridae
- Genus: Promalactis
- Species: P. convexa

Binomial name
- Promalactis convexa Du & Wang, 2013

= Promalactis convexa =

Species of moth

Promalactis convexa is a moth of the family Oecophoridae. It is found in Sichuan, China.

The wingspan is about 15–16 mm. The ground colour of the forewings is ochreous brown. The markings are white edged with black scales. The hindwings and cilia are dark grey.

== Etymology ==
The specific name is derived from Latin convexus (meaning convex) and refers to the sacculus which is strongly convex dorso-basally.
