= Deolo Hill =

Hill in West Bengal, India

Coordinates: 27.0888°N 88.5026°E

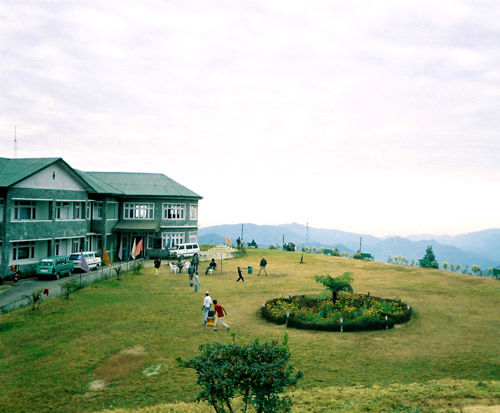
The Deolo Guesthouse atop the Deolo Hill. The top of the hill is a beautifully landscaped garden overlooking the two reservoirs.

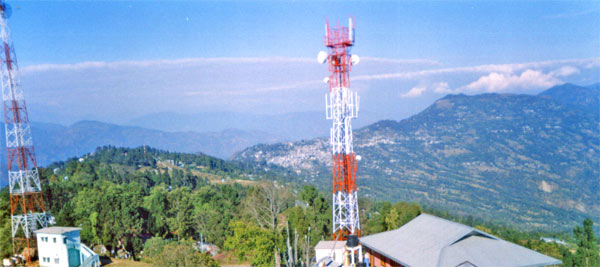
View of Deolo Hill and Kalimpong, from the opposite Durpin Hill

Delo Hill is one of the two hills that the town of Kalimpong stands between. Kalimpong is situated on a ridge connecting the two hills, Durpin and Delo. The hill is 1,704 metres (5,590 feet) above msl. The hill is located north east of the town. Three water reservoirs, two of which serve as the primary drinking water source to the town are present atop this hill. The town of Kalimpong, the surrounding villages of Relli valley, Teesta River and its valleys all can be viewed from this point.

On a clear day, the snow-clad mountains of West Sikkim are also visible from this hill. At the summit of this hill, there is a park built for recreation purposes which feature exotic flowers. The park is a popular picnic spot for tourists as well as locals. Near the park a Hindu temple is also a visited spot. Overall Deolo provides a panoramic 360 degree view of Kalimpong town and its neighbouring hills.
