= Gajoldoba =

Gajoldoba Gojaldoba
- Village
- Location in West Bengal, India Gajoldoba (India)
- Coordinates: 26.7515°N 88.5856°E
- Country: India
- State: West Bengal
- District: Jalpaiguri

Population (2011)
  - Total: 2,644
- Time zone: UTC+5:30 (IST)
- PIN: 735133
- Telephone/STD code: 03562
- Vehicle registration: WB
- Lok Sabha constituency: Jalpaiguri
- Vidhan Sabha constituency: Rajganj
- Website: jalpaiguri.gov.in

Gajoldoba or Gojaldoba is a village at the Rajganj CD block of the Jalpaiguri district in the state of West Bengal, India.

== Geography ==
Places and tea estates in Malbabazar subdivision (including Mal, Nagrakata and Matiali CD blocks) in Jalpaiguri district
CT: census town, R: rural/ urban centre, N: neighbourhood, NP: national park/ wildlife sanctuary, TE: tea estate
Abbreviations used in names – TG for Tea Garden (town/village), TE for Tea Estate, JRS: junction railway station
Owing to space constraints in the small map, the actual locations in a larger map may vary slightly

=== Location ===
Gajoldoba is located at 26.7515°N 88.5856°E.

=== Area overview ===
Gorumara National Park has overtaken traditionally popular Jaldapara National Park in footfall and Malbazar has emerged as one of the most important towns in the Dooars. Malbazar subdivision is presented in the map alongside. It is a predominantly rural area with 88.62% of the population living in rural areas and 11.32% living in the urban areas. Tea gardens in the Dooars and Terai regions produce 226 million kg or over a quarter of India's total tea crop. Some tea gardens were identified in the 2011 census as census towns or villages. Such places are marked in the map as CT (census town) or R (rural/ urban centre). Specific tea estate pages are marked TE.

Note: The map alongside presents some of the notable locations in the subdivision. All places marked in the map are linked in the larger full screen map.

== Demographics ==
As per the 2011 Census of India, Gojaldoba Tea Garden had a total population of 5,184. There were 2,680 (52%) males and 2,054 (48%) females. There were 687 persons in the age range of 0 to 6 years. The total number of literate people in Gojaldoba Tea Garden was 3,166 (70.40% of the population over 6 years).

== Tourism ==
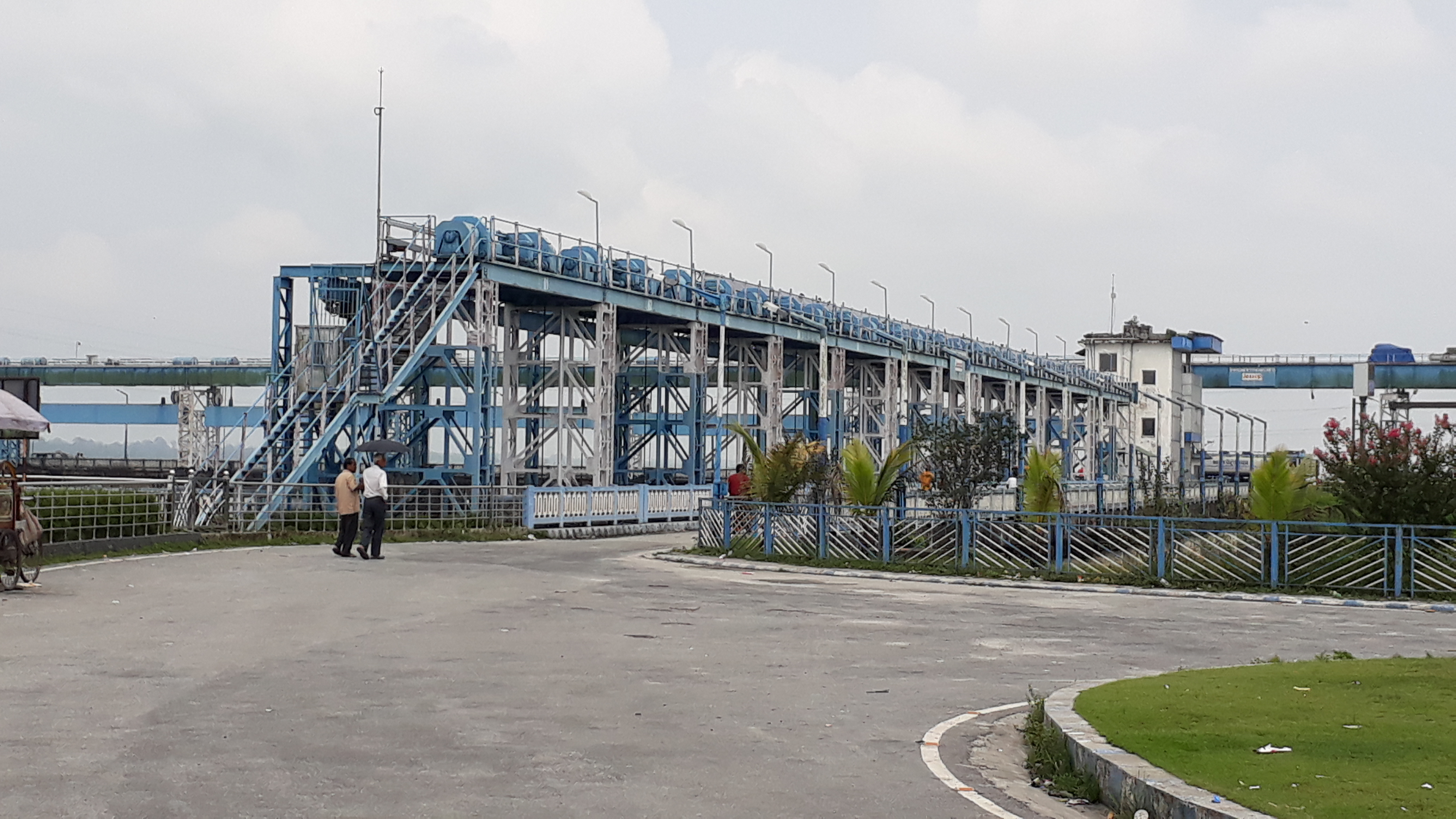
Gajoldoba Barrage on Teesta river

In 1985, The Teesta Barrage was built here by Jessop for irrigation purposes, with its reservoir becoming both a popular tourist attraction and a bird watching centre.

The Baikunthapur Forest, surrounding the reservoir, is said to have been chosen by Lord Krishna and his principal wife and queen Rukmani as their hiding place.
