= Mangan subdivision =

Mangan
- Subdivision
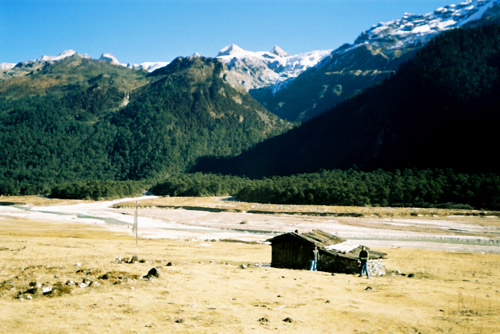
- A hut in the Yumthang Valley.

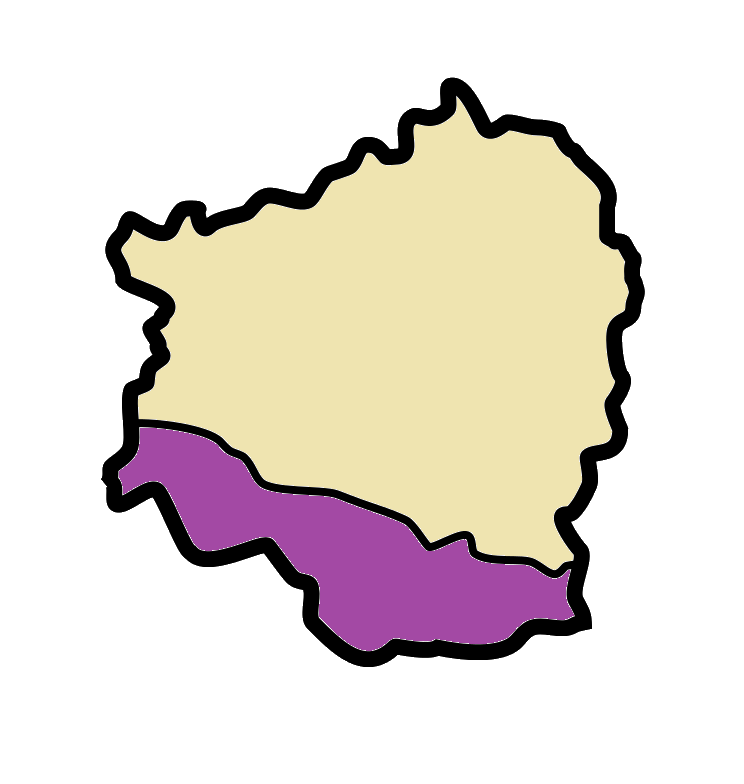
- Mangan subdivision's location in North Sikkim.
- Country: India
- State: Sikkim
- District: North Sikkim
- Time zone: UTC+5:30 (IST)
- ISO 3166 code: IN-SK

Mangan subdivision is one of the two sub-districts of North Sikkim district, in the state of Sikkim, India. Mangan is the headquarters.

== Villages ==
It contains 46 census-designated villages:

- Naga-Namgor
- Meyong
- Singchit
- Pakshep
- Kazor
- Sentam
- Salim Pakel
- Lingthem
- Lingdem
- Tingbong
- Lingzah-Tolung
- Sakyong-Pentong
- Lum
- Sangtok
- Gor
- Gnon-Samdong
- Hee-Gyathang
- Barfok
- Lingdong
- Zimchung
- Singhik
- Ringhim
- Nampatam
- Tingchim
- Upper Mangshila
- Lower Mangshila
- Namok
- Sheyam
- Tangyek
- Ramthamg
- Rongong
- Tumlong
- Phodong
- Chawang
- Phamtam
- Men-Rongong
- Paney-Phensong
- Labi
- Kabi
- Tingda
- Upper Dzongu Forest Block
- Lower Dzongu Forest Block
- Naga Forest Block
- Mangan Forest Block
- Phodong Forest Block
- Kabi Forest Block
