= Labrang Monastery (Sikkim) =

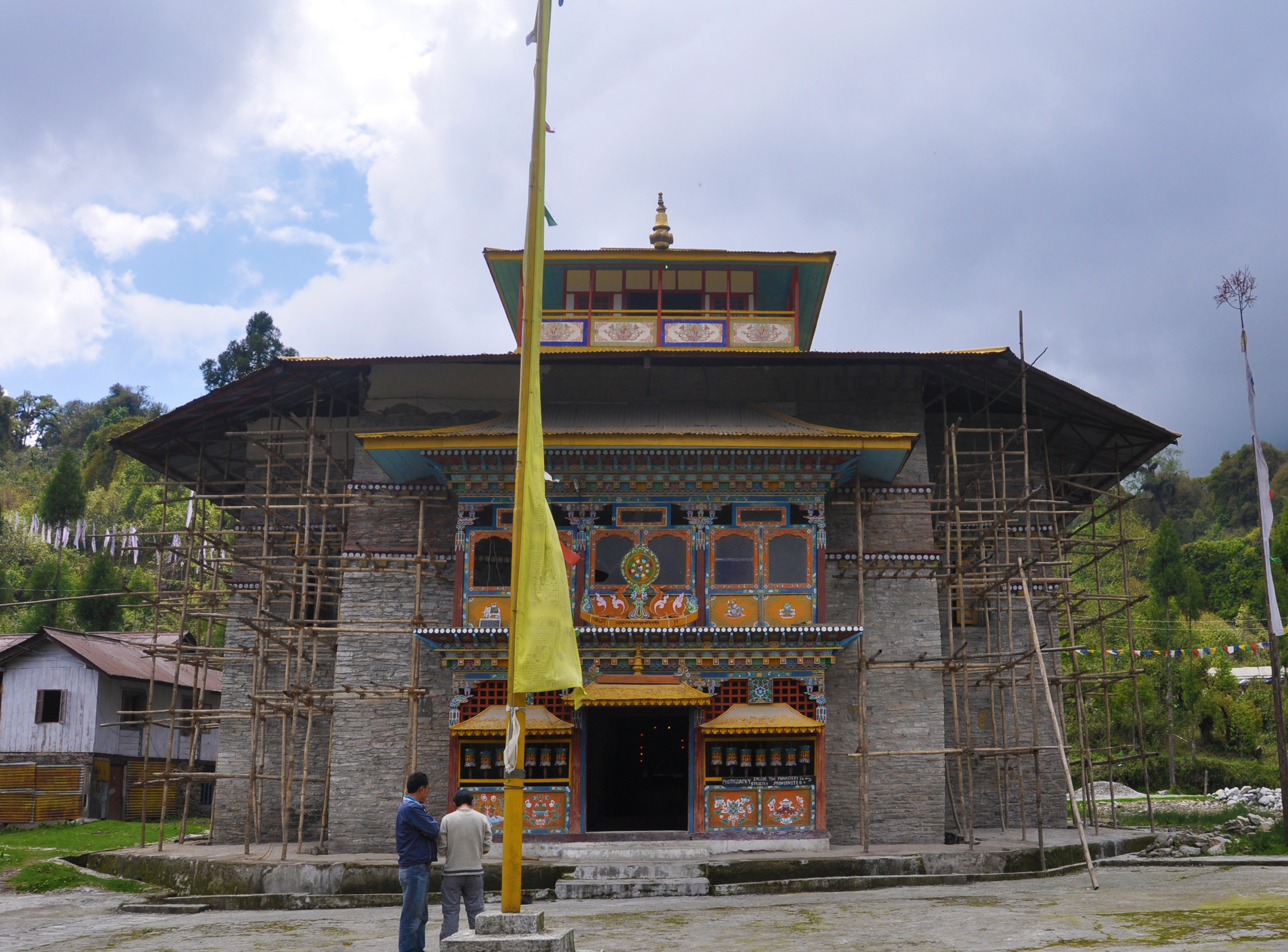
- Labrang Monastery

- Location within Sikkim

Religion
- Affiliation: Tibetan Buddhism
- Sect: Nyingmapa

Location
- Location: Phodong, Sikkim
- Country: India
- Interactive map of Labrang Monastery (Sikkim)
- Coordinates: 27°25′05″N 88°34′46″E

Architecture
- Founder: Gyalshe Rigzing Chempa
- Established: 1844; 182 years ago

Labrang Monastery (Sikkim), (lit. 'lama's dwelling', a.k.a. Palden Phuntshog Phodrang or Palden Phuntsok Monastery) is a Buddhist monastery located in Mangan district, Sikkim, India.

== Geographic location ==
Labrang Monastery is situated 38 km from Gangtok and located on flat ground on a hill, at an altitude of 7000 ft. It is surrounded by lush green jungle. It is located 2 km from Phodong Monastery.

== History ==
Labrang Monastery was constructed in Tumlong, North Sikkim in 1826 CE and completed in 1843 CE. The monastery's founder was Gyalshe Rigzing Chempa, the son of King Tsugphud Namgyal. The monastery was built in memory of Latsun Chembo of Kongpo, Tibet. Major renovation was carried out in 1978 with government aid. The monastery sustained damage in 2006 as a result of earthquakes in the region.

== Architecture ==
The wooden pillars and roofing of the monastery have been reinforced with steel. The building is unique in that it retains its original structure, whereas similar buildings in Sikkim have burned down. The monastery holds a bronze statue of Karma Guru, a wrathful form of Padmasambhava.

== Museum ==
The monastery houses a museum with a large collection of Buddha statues, sutras and murals.
