= Phamtam =

- Village
- Location in Sikkim, India Phamtam (India)
- Coordinates: 27.4511°N 88.6108°E
- Country: India
- State: Sikkim
- District: North Sikkim
- Subdivision: Mangan
- Time zone: UTC+5:30 (IST)
- ISO 3166 code: IN-SK

Phamtam is a village in the Mangan subdivision of North Sikkim district in the north Indian state of Sikkim. The Ministry of Home Affairs has given it a geographical code of 260902.
