= Lum =

Lum or LUM may refer to:

== People ==
- Lao Lum, an ethnic group of Laos
- Lum (surname), various surnames of English and Chinese origin (including a list of people with these surnames)
- Lum Croxton (1885–1916), American Negro League baseball pitcher
- Lum Davenport (1900–1961), American Major League baseball pitcher
- Lum Harris (1915–1996), American Major League baseball pitcher
- Lum Snyder (1930–1985), American football player
- Lum Rexhepi (born 1992), Albanian footballer

== Places ==
- Lum, Michigan, an unincorporated community in Lapeer County, Michigan, United States
- Lum, Albania, village in northeastern Albania
- Lum, Sikkim, India

== Other ==
- Lumican, a protein encoded by the LUM gene
- Alfa Lum cycling team
- IBM LUM (licence use management)
- WLUM-FM, a radio station in Milwaukee, Wisconsin
- Place of Memory, Tolerance and Social Inclusion, a Peruvian museum, abbreviated LUM in Spanish

== Transportation ==
- IATA code for Dehong Mangshi Airport, China
- MTR station code for Lung Mun stop, Hong Kong
- Former IATA code for Maputo International Airport

== In popular culture ==
- A collectible item in the Rayman video game series
- A character in Lum and Abner, American radio comedy (short for the name Columbus)
- Lum (Urusei Yatsura), a character from Urusei Yatsura
  - Urusei Yatsura, Japanese manga series sometimes referred to as Lum
- Lum the Mad (Greyhawk), a character from the Greyhawk campaign setting for Dungeons & Dragons
  - Lum the Mad, also known as Scott Jennings, MMORPG commentator

== See also ==
- LUMS (disambiguation)
