= Hee-Gyathang =

- Hee- Gyathang GPUs
- Location in Sikkim, India Hee-Gyathang (India)
- Coordinates: 27°29′32.24″N 88°31′23.56″E
- Country: India
- State: Sikkim
- District: North Sikkim
- Subdivision: Mangan subdivision

Population (2011)
  - Total: 1,180
- Time zone: UTC+5:30 (IST)
- ISO 3166 code: IN-SK
- Literacy: 83.43%

Hee-Gyathang is a village in Mangan subdivision, North Sikkim district, Sikkim, India. The Ministry of Home Affairs has given it a geographical code of 260884.
