= Naga-Namgor =

- Village
- Location in Sikkim, India Naga-Namgor (India)
- Coordinates: 27°32′54.73″N 88°38′34.86″E
- Country: India
- State: Sikkim
- District: North Sikkim
- Subdivision: Mangan
- Time zone: UTC+5:30 (IST)
- ISO 3166 code: IN-SK

Naga-Namgor is a village in Mangan subdivision, North Sikkim district, Sikkim, India. The Ministry of Home Affairs has given it a geographical code of 260868.
