= Paney-Phensong =

- Village
- Location in Sikkim, India Paney-Phensong (India)
- Coordinates: 27.26°N 88.38°E
- Country: India
- State: Sikkim
- District: North Sikkim
- Subdivision: Mangan

Population (2011)
  - Total: 682
- Time zone: UTC+5:30 (IST)
- Postal code: 260904
- ISO 3166 code: IN-SK

Paney-Phensong is a village in Mangan subdivision, North Sikkim district, Sikkim, India. The Ministry of Home Affairs has given it a geographical code of 260904.
