= Gor, Sikkim =

Gor
- Village
- Location in Sikkim, India Gor (India)
- Coordinates: 27°26′30.55″N 88°31′21.97″E
- Country: India
- State: Sikkim
- District: North Sikkim
- Subdivision: Mangan

Population 2011
  - Total: 861
- Time zone: UTC+5:30 (IST)
- ISO 3166 code: IN-SK
- Literacy: 74.40%

Gor is a village in Mangan subdivision, North Sikkim district, Sikkim, India. The Ministry of Home Affairs has given it a geographical code of 260882.
