= Upper Dzongu Forest Block =

- Village
- Location within Sikkim
- Coordinates: 27.510°N 88.438°E
- Country: India
- State: Sikkim
- District: North Sikkim
- Subdivision: Mangan
- Time zone: UTC+5:30 (IST)
- ISO 3166 code: IN-SK

Upper Dzongu Forest Block is a village in Mangan subdivision, North Sikkim district, Sikkim, India. The Ministry of Home Affairs has given it a geographical code of 260908.

== Location ==
The Upper Dzongu block and the villages it comprises, all are located on the other side of the Rungyung Chu river. To access the Upper areas of Dzongu, one has to cross the massive riverbed of Rungyung Chu. The vast riverbed can be crossed through a beautiful suspension Bridge at Mantam area. Some of the villages in the upper Dzongu area include Tingvong, Kusong, Sakyong-Pentong and Lingthem. Motorable roads end at Lingzya in Upper Dzongu after Tingvong. One has to trek to other villages lying beyond.
