= Gnon-Samdong =

Gnon-Sangdong
- Village
- Location within Sikkim Location within India
- Coordinates: 27°27′46.73″N 88°31′28.96″E
- Country: India
- State: Sikkim
- District: North Sikkim
- Subdivision: Dzongu

Population (2011)
  - Total: 333
- Time zone: UTC+5:30 (IST)
- ISO 3166 code: IN-SK
- Literacy: 85.06%

Gnon-Sangdong is a small village under Hee-Gyathang GPU in Dzongu subdivision, Mangan, Sikkim, India. The Ministry of Home Affairs has given it a geographical code of 260883.
