= Mangan Forest Block =

- Village
- Location within Sikkim
- Coordinates: 27.493°N 88.595°E
- Country: India
- State: Sikkim
- District: North Sikkim
- Subdivision: Mangan

Population (2011)
  - Total: 9
- Time zone: UTC+5:30 (IST)
- ISO 3166 code: IN-SK
- Literacy: 22.22%

Mangan Forest Block is a village in Mangan subdivision, North Sikkim district, Sikkim, India. The Ministry of Home Affairs has given it a geographical code of 260911.
