= Tangyek =

- Village
- Location in Sikkim, India Tangyek (India)
- Coordinates: 27°26′04.02″N 88°33′11.70″E
- Country: India
- State: Sikkim
- District: North Sikkim
- Subdivision: Mangan
- Time zone: UTC+5:30 (IST)
- ISO 3166 code: IN-SK

Tangyek is a village in Mangan subdivision, North Sikkim district, Sikkim, India. The Ministry of Home Affairs has given it a geographical code of 260896.
