= Lingdem =

- Village
- Location in Sikkim, India Lingdem (India)
- Coordinates: 27°31′N 88°32′E
- Country: India
- State: Sikkim
- District: North Sikkim
- Subdivision: Mangan

Population (2011)
  - Total: 392
- Time zone: UTC+5:30 (IST)
- PIN: 737116
- ISO 3166 code: IN-SK
- Literacy: 70.26%

Lingdem is a village in Mangan subdivision, North Sikkim district, Sikkim, India. The Ministry of Home Affairs has given it a geographical code of 260876.
