= Salim Pakel =

Salim Pakel Saffu
- Village
- Location in Sikkim, India Salim Pakel (India)
- Coordinates: 27°32′52.69″N 88°34′26.08″E
- Country: India
- State: Sikkim
- District: North Sikkim
- Subdivision: Mangan

Population
  - Total: 45
- Time zone: UTC+5:30 (IST)
- Postal code: 737120
- ISO 3166 code: IN-SK

Salim Pakel is a village in Mangan subdivision, North Sikkim district, Sikkim, India. The Ministry of Home Affairs has given it a geographical code of 260874.
