= Lingzah-Tolung =

- Village
- Location in Sikkim, India Lingzah-Tolung (India)
- Coordinates: 27°34′47.45″N 88°28′26.46″E
- Country: India
- State: Sikkim
- District: North Sikkim
- Subdivision: Mangan

Population (2011)
  - Total: 422
- Time zone: UTC+5:30 (IST)
- ISO 3166 code: IN-SK
- Literacy: 83.42%

Lingzah-Tolung is a village in Mangan subdivision, North Sikkim district, Sikkim, India. The Ministry of Home Affairs has given it a geographical code of 260878.
