= Kabi Forest Block =

- Village
- Location in Sikkim, India Kabi Forest Block (India)
- Coordinates: 27°29′10.86″N 88°34′13.22″E
- Country: India
- State: Sikkim
- District: North Sikkim
- Subdivision: Mangan

Population (2011)
  - Total: 5
- Time zone: UTC+5:30 (IST)
- ISO 3166 code: IN-SK
- Literacy: 20.00%

Kabi Forest Block is a village in Mangan subdivision, North Sikkim district, Sikkim, India. The Ministry of Home Affairs has given it a geographical code of 260913.
