= Sakyong-Pentong =

Coordinates: 27°36′28.12″N 88°24′58.64″E

- Village
- Interactive map of Sakyong-Pentong
- Country: India
- State: Sikkim
- District: North Sikkim
- Subdivision: Mangan
- Time zone: UTC+5:30 (IST)
- ISO 3166 code: IN-SK

Sakyong-Pentong is a village in Mangan subdivision, North Sikkim district, Sikkim, India. The Ministry of Home Affairs has given it a geographical code of 260879.
