= Lachen Forest Block =

- Village
- Location within Sikkim Location within India
- Coordinates: 27.717°N 88.560°E
- Country: India
- State: Sikkim
- District: North Sikkim
- Subdivision: Chungthang
- Time zone: UTC+5:30 (IST)
- ISO 3166 code: IN-SK

Lachen Forest Block is a village in Chungthang subdivision, North Sikkim district, Sikkim, India. The Ministry of Home Affairs has given it a geographical code of 260864.
