= Upper Mangshila =

- Village
- Location in Sikkim, India Upper Mangshila (India)
- Coordinates: 27°28′40.98″N 88°33′16.24″E
- Country: India
- State: Sikkim
- District: Mangan
- Subdivision: Mangan
- Time zone: UTC+5:30 (IST)
- ISO 3166 code: IN-SK

Upper Mangshila is a village in Mangan subdivision, Mangan district, Sikkim, India. The Ministry of Home Affairs has given it a geographical code of 260892.
