= Zimchung =

- Village
- Location in Sikkim, India Zimchung (India)
- Coordinates: 27°30′10.80″N 88°33′30.53″E
- Country: India
- State: Sikkim
- District: North Sikkim
- Subdivision: Mangan
- Time zone: UTC+5:30 (IST)
- ISO 3166 code: IN-SK

Zimchung is a village in Mangan subdivision, North Sikkim district, Sikkim, India. The Ministry of Home Affairs has given it a geographical code of 260887.
