= Chawang =

- Village
- Location within Sikkim Location within India
- Coordinates: 27.4328°N 88.5939°E
- Country: India
- State: Sikkim
- District: North Sikkim
- Subdivision: Mangan

Population (As of 2011)
  - Total: Approximately 579
- Time zone: UTC+5:30 (IST)
- ISO 3166 code: IN-SK
- Literacy: 83.68%

Chawang is a village in Mangan subdivision, North Sikkim district, Sikkim, India. The Ministry of Home Affairs has given it a geographical code of 260901.
