= Meyong, Sikkim =

Meyong
- Village
- Location in Sikkim, India Meyong (India)
- Coordinates: 27°32′30.62″N 88°37′25.00″E
- Country: India
- State: Sikkim
- District: North Sikkim
- Subdivision: Mangan

Population (2011)
  - Total: 130
- Time zone: UTC+5:30 (IST)
- ISO 3166 code: IN-SK
- Literacy: 86.09%

Meyong is a village in Mangan subdivision, North Sikkim district, Sikkim, India. The Ministry of Home Affairs has given it a geographical code of 260869.
