= Chungthang subdivision =

Chungthang
- Subdivision
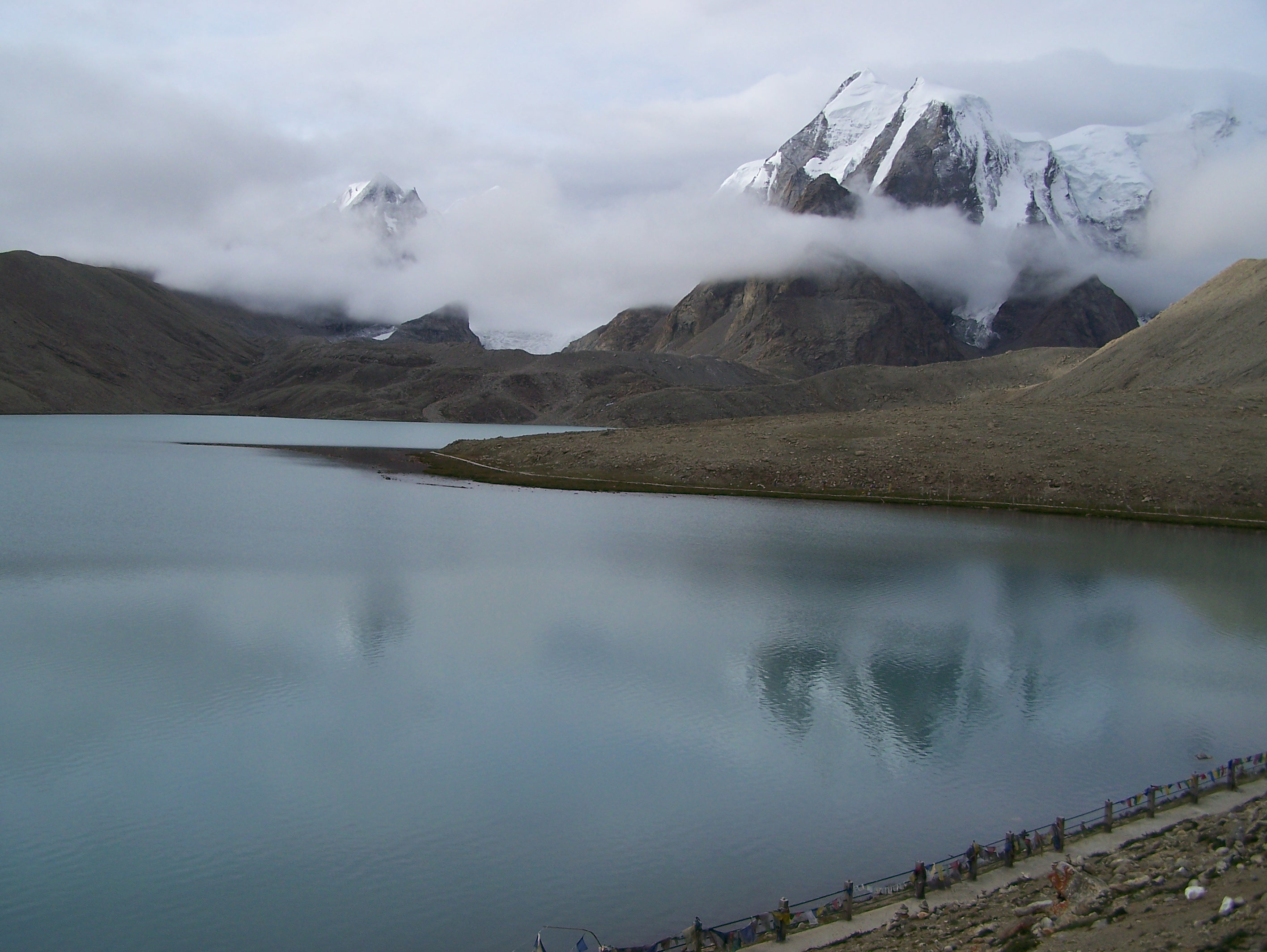
- Gurudongmar Lake, one of the highest lakes in the world.

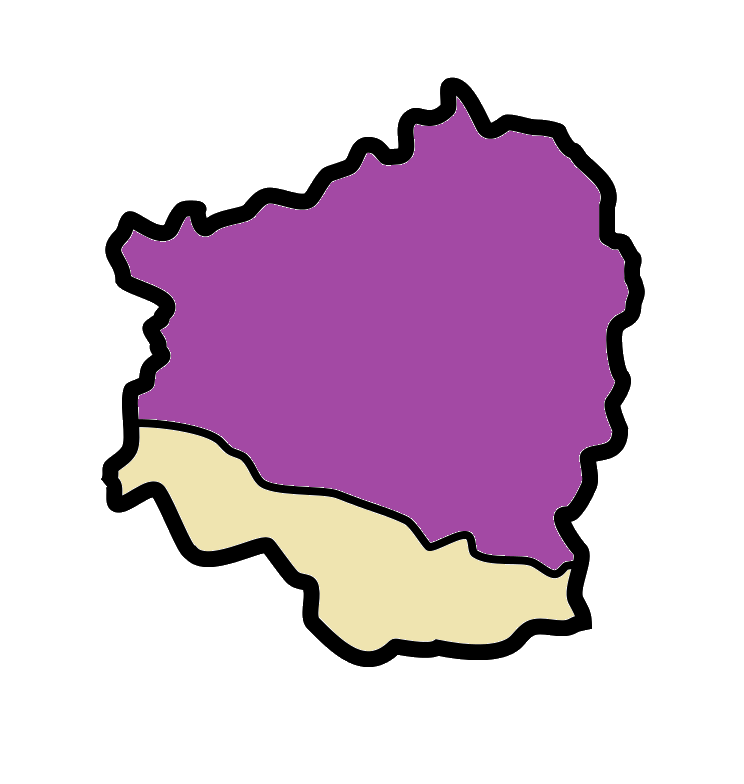
- Chungthang subdivision's location in North Sikkim.
- Country: India
- State: Sikkim
- District: North Sikkim

Area
  - Total: 3,285 km^{2} (1,268 sq mi)

Population
  - Total: 10,038
  - Density: 3.056/km^{2} (7.914/sq mi)
- Time zone: UTC+5:30 (IST)
- ISO 3166 code: IN-SK

Chungthang subdivision is one of the two sub-districts of North Sikkim district, in the state of Sikkim, India. Chungthang is the headquarters. Covering an area of 3285 km², Chungthang is home to a population of 10038 people, according to the 2011 Census.

== Villages ==
It contains nine census-designated villages:

- Chungthang
- Lachen
- Lachung
- Shipgyer
- Tung
- Lachen Forest Block
- Thangu Forest Block
- Lachung Forest Block
- Chungthang Forest Block
