= Lingthem =

- Village
- Location in Sikkim, India Lingthem (India)
- Coordinates: 27°31′N 88°32′E
- Country: India
- State: Sikkim
- District: Mangan
- Subdivision: Mangan

Population (2011)
  - Total: 1,226
- Time zone: UTC+5:30 (IST)
- ISO 3166 code: IN-SK
- Literacy: 80.71%

Lingthem is a village in Mangan subdivision, Mangan district, Sikkim, India. The Ministry of Home Affairs has given it a geographical code of 260875.
