= Tung, Sikkim =

Tung (Sikkim)
- Village
- Location in Sikkim, India Tung (Sikkim) (India)
- Coordinates: 27.5436°N 88.6480°E
- Country: India
- State: Sikkim
- District: North Sikkim
- Subdivision: Chungthang
- Time zone: UTC+5:30 (IST)
- ISO 3166 code: IN-SK

Tung is a village in the Chungthang subdivision of North Sikkim district in the north Indian state of Sikkim. The Ministry of Home Affairs has given it a geographical code of 260863.
