= Chungthang Forest Block =

- Village
- Location within Sikkim Location within India
- Coordinates: 27.6033°N 88.6865°E
- Country: India
- State: Sikkim
- District: North Sikkim
- Subdivision: Chungthang
- Time zone: UTC+5:30 (IST)
- ISO 3166 code: IN-SK

Chungthang Forest Block is a village in Chungthang subdivision, North Sikkim district, Sikkim, India. The Ministry of Home Affairs has given it a geographical code of 260867.
