= Men-Rongong =

- Village
- Location in Sikkim, India Men-Rongong (India)
- Country: India
- State: Sikkim
- District: North Sikkim
- Subdivision: Mangan

Population (2011)
  - Total: 412
- Time zone: UTC+5:30 (IST)
- ISO 3166 code: IN-SK
- Literacy: 77.48%

Men-Rongong is a village in Mangan subdivision, North Sikkim district, Sikkim, India. The Ministry of Home Affairs has given it a geographical code of 260903.
