= Naga Forest Block =

- Village
- Location within Sikkim
- Coordinates: 27.522°N 88.630°E
- Country: India
- State: Sikkim
- District: North Sikkim
- Subdivision: Mangan

Population (2011)
  - Total: 10
- Time zone: UTC+5:30 (IST)
- ISO 3166 code: IN-SK
- Literacy: 0.00%

Naga Forest Block is a village in Mangan subdivision, North Sikkim district, Sikkim, India. The Ministry of Home Affairs has given it a geographical code of 260910.
