= Tingbong =

- Village
- Location in Sikkim, India Tingbong (India)
- Coordinates: 27°33′48.89″N 88°31′22.76″E
- Country: India
- State: Sikkim
- District: North Sikkim
- Subdivision: Mangan
- Time zone: UTC+5:30 (IST)
- ISO 3166 code: IN-SK

Tingbong is a village in Mangan subdivision, North Sikkim district, Sikkim, India. The Ministry of Home Affairs has given it a geographical code of 260877.
