= Pakshep =

- Village
- Location in Sikkim, India Pakshep (India)
- Coordinates: 27°31′09.52″N 88°35′03.84″E
- Country: India
- State: Sikkim
- District: North Sikkim
- Subdivision: Mangan
- Time zone: UTC+5:30 (IST)
- ISO 3166 code: IN-SK

Pakshep is a village in Mangan subdivision, North Sikkim district, Sikkim, India. The Ministry of Home Affairs has given it a geographical code of 260871.
