= Lower Mangshila =

- Village
- Location in Sikkim, India Lower Mangshila (India)
- Country: India
- State: Sikkim
- District: North Sikkim
- Subdivision: Mangan

Population (2011)
  - Total: 1,172
- Time zone: UTC+5:30 (IST)
- ISO 3166 code: IN-SK
- Literacy: 70.04%

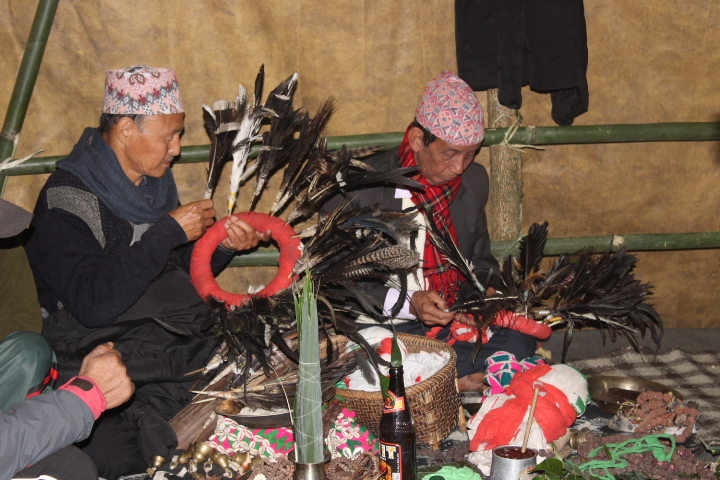
In general, Limbu shamans are called Phedangma or Murabang. They are preparing headgear for the ritual.

Lower Mangshila is a village in Mangan subdivision, North Sikkim district, Sikkim, India. The Ministry of Home Affairs has given it a geographical code of 260893.
