= Shipgyer =

- Village
- Location in Sikkim, India Shipgyer (India)
- Coordinates: 27.5570°N 88.6330°E
- Country: India
- State: Sikkim
- District: North Sikkim
- Subdivision: Chungthang
- Time zone: UTC+5:30 (IST)
- ISO 3166 code: IN-SK

Shipgyer is a village in Chungthang subdivision, North Sikkim district, Sikkim, India. The Ministry of Home Affairs has given it a geographical code of 260862.
