= Lingdong, North Sikkim =

Coordinates: 27°31′28.16″N 88°32′18.38″E

Lingdong
- Village
- Interactive map of Lingdong
- Country: India
- State: Sikkim
- District: North Sikkim
- Subdivision: Mangan

Population (2011)
  - Total: 667
- Time zone: UTC+5:30 (IST)
- ISO 3166 code: IN-SK
- Literacy: 87.35%

Lingdong is a village in Mangan subdivision, North Sikkim district, Sikkim, India. The Ministry of Home Affairs has given it a geographical code of 260886.
