= Lamo Angdang =

Mountain peak in Sikkim

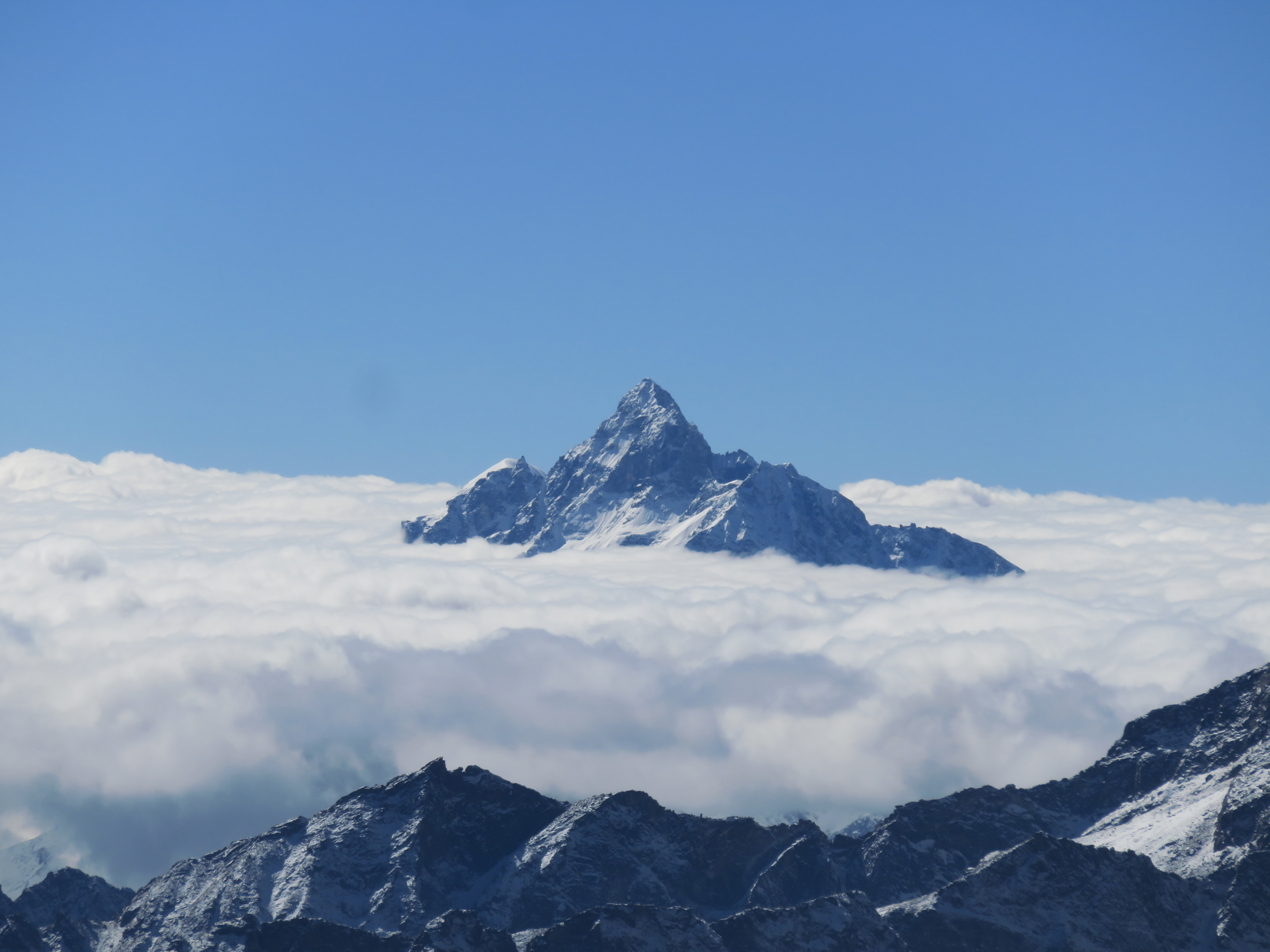
- Lamo Angdang from north

Highest point
- Elevation: 5,888 m (19,318 ft)
- Prominence: 1,223 m (4,012 ft)
- Coordinates: 27°44′01.84″N 88°29′38.82″E

Geography
- Location within Sikkim Location within India
- Location: Sikkim

Climbing
- First ascent: No records

Lamo Angdang (also known as Lamaanden and Lamo Anden) is a mountain in the Eastern Himalayas, located in the west of Sikkim. Its elevation above sea level is 5,888m.

== Location ==
It is the easternmost summit of the Kangchenjunga group and it is officially part of Khangchendzonga National Park. In 2007, it was opened for public as a new trekking route in the North Sikkim district.
