= Kabi, Sikkim =

Kabi
- Village
- Location in Sikkim, India Kabi (India)
- Coordinates: 27°25′26.33″N 88°39′08.57″E
- Country: India
- State: Sikkim
- District: North Sikkim
- Subdivision: Mangan

Population (2011)
  - Total: 1,590
- Time zone: UTC+5:30 (IST)
- ISO 3166 code: IN-SK
- Literacy: 80.65%

Kabi is a village in Mangan subdivision, North Sikkim district, Sikkim, India. The Ministry of Home Affairs has given it a geographical code of 260906.

== Demographics ==
As of the 2011 Census of India, Kabi had a population of 1,590, spread over 323 households.

== See also ==
- Kabi Longstok
