= Dzumsa =

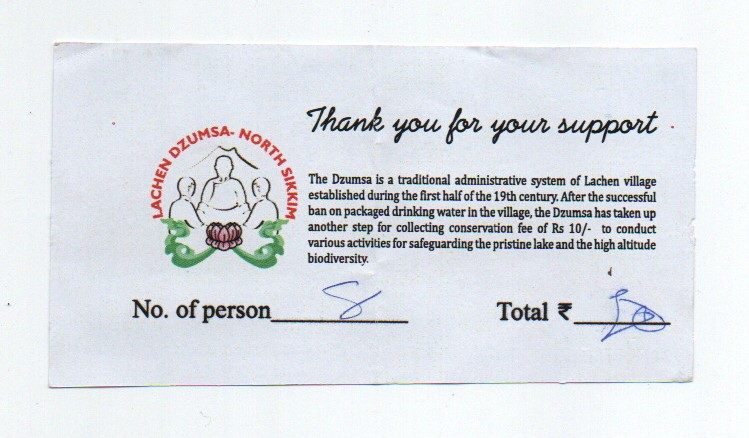
Lachen entry point ticket

Dzumsa (pronounced as zom-sa) is a traditional administrative institution of the villages of Lachen and Lachung in North Sikkim, India. It is a self-government system where a headman, known as the 'Pipon', is elected to chair the community where all the disputes are settled in a democratic manner. This system of self-governance was established during the first half of the 19th century in order to provide structure and cohesion for societies and their activities. The traditional system of Dzumsa is still prevalent in North Sikkim.
