= Chombu =

Mountain peak in Sikkim, India

- Location within Sikkim Location within India

Highest point
- Elevation: 6,362 m (20,873 ft)
- Coordinates: 27°53′58″N 88°38′41″E

Geography
- Location: Sikkim, India

Climbing
- First ascent: No records

Chombu is a mountain peak with elevation 6,362 m (20,873 ft) located in the north of Sikkim, India.

== Location ==
The peak is located in a relatively isolated part of North Sikkim, along the path that leads to the Thangu-Yumesandong pass. The prominence is 1,034 m (3,392 ft).

== Climbing history ==
There are no documented ascents of Chombu. Also, due to its proximity to the Tibetan border, climbing on it is strictly controlled.

=== Attempts ===
In 2019 and 2022, two mountaineers from London made three attempts to climb the summit, but they were unsuccessful. The peak is still unconquered.
