= Labi, Sikkim =

Labi
- Village
- Location in Sikkim, India Labi (India)
- Coordinates: 27°27′07.27″N 88°41′15.29″E
- Country: India
- State: Sikkim
- District: North Sikkim
- Subdivision: Mangan

Population (2011)
  - Total: 626
- Time zone: UTC+5:30 (IST)
- ISO 3166 code: IN-SK
- Literacy: 85.45%

Labi is a village in Mangan subdivision, North Sikkim district, Sikkim, India. The Ministry of Home Affairs has given it a geographical code of 260905.
