= Lingdong =

Lingdong may refer to:

== Places ==
=== China ===
- Lingdong District, in Shuangyashan, Heilongjiang
- Lingdong Subdistrict, Gongzhuling, in Gongzhuling, Changchun, Jilin
- Lingdong Subdistrict, Wafangdian, in Wafangdian, Dalian, Liaoning
- Lingdong Subdistrict, Yuhong District, in Yuhong District, Shenyang, Liaoning

=== India ===
- Lingdong, North Sikkim, Sikkim

== Other ==
- Elantra Lingdong PHEV, Beijing Hyundai automobile introduced in 2019
