= Kabi =

Kabi or KABI may refer to:

== Places ==
- Kabi Longstok, town in North Sikkim district, Sikkim, India
- Kabi, Sikkim, village in North Sikkim district, Sikkim, India
- Kabi River (Kafu River), river in Uganda

== People ==
- Boris Kabi (born 1984), Ivorian footballer
- Martinho Ndafa Kabi (born 1957), Bissau-Guinean politician
- Neeraj Kabi, Indian actor
- Yahya Kabi (born 1987), Saudi Arabian footballer
- Käbi Laretei (1922–2014), Swedish pianist

== Other ==
- Gubbi Gubbi people or Kabi Kabi people, an Aboriginal Australian people in Queensland
- KABI (AM), AM radio station in Abilene, Kansas
- KABI-LD, a low-power television station (channel 32, virtual 42) licensed to serve Snyder, Texas, United States
- KSAJ-FM, a radio station (98.5 FM) licensed to serve Burlingame, Kansas, United States, which held the call sign KABI-FM from 1968 to 1985
- The ICAO airport code for Abilene Regional Airport in Abilene, Texas
