= Lum, Sikkim =

Lum
- Village
- Location in Sikkim, India Lum (India)
- Coordinates: 27°30′35.64″N 88°31′4.69″E
- Country: India
- State: Sikkim
- District: North Sikkim
- Subdivision: Mangan

Population (2011)
  - Total: 331
- Time zone: UTC+5:30 (IST)
- ISO 3166 code: IN-SK
- Literacy: 74.82%

Lum is a village in Mangan subdivision, North Sikkim district, Sikkim, India. The Ministry of Home Affairs has given it a geographical code of 260880.
