= Labi =

Labi may refer to:

- Emmanuel Gyimah Labi (born 1950), Ghanaian composer, conductor, and music professor
- Labi, Sikkim, village in India
- Labi Siffre (born 1945), British poet, songwriter, musician and singer
- Labi language
- Mukim Labi, mukim of Brunei

== See also ==
- Ahmad ibn Muhammad al-Tha'labi, 11th century Islamic scholar
- It Must Be Love (Labi Siffre song)", song originally written and recorded in 1971 by Labi Siffre
- Labi Siffre (album), the 1970 debut release by Labi Siffre
- Labu dan Labi, 1962 Malaysian comedy film directed by and starring P. Ramlee
- Nasib Si Labu Labi, 1962 Malaysian comedy film directed by and starring P. Ramlee
- Louisiana Association of Business and Industry, an interest group established in 1976

Media related to Labi at Wikimedia Commons
