= Sidkeong Tulku Namgyal =

Chogyal of Sikkim in 1914

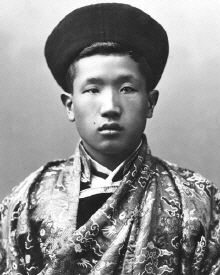
- Photograph of Sidkeong Tulku

Chogyal of Sikkim
- Reign: 11 February 1914 – 5 December 1914
- Predecessor: Thutob Namgyal
- Successor: Tashi Namgyal
- Born: 1879
- Died: 5 December 1914 (aged 34–35); Gangtok, Sikkim
- House: Namgyal dynasty
- Father: Thutob Namgyal
- Mother: Maharani Pending
- Religion: Buddhism

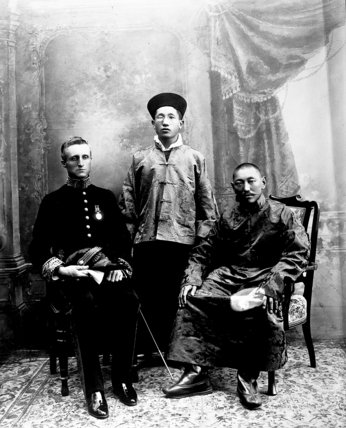
The 13th Dalai Lama, Sir Charles Bell (both seated) and Maharaj Kumar Sidkeong Tulku Namgyal (standing between the other two) pose for photograph, 1910, Calcutta.

Sidkeong Tulku Namgyal (Sikkimese: སྲིད་སཀྱོང་སྤྲུལ་སྐུ་རྣམ་རྒྱལ་; Wylie: srid skyong sprul sku rnam rgyal) (1879–5 December 1914) was the ruling Chogyal of Sikkim for a brief period in 1914, from 10 February to 5 December.

== Biography ==
He was the second son of Maharaja Sri Panch Sir Thutob Namgyal, and was educated at St. Paul's School, Darjeeling and at Pembroke College, Oxford. A polyglot, he was learned in Chinese, English, Hindi, Lepcha, Nepali and Tibetan.

He was recognised as the reincarnation (tulku) of his uncle, Sidkeong Namgyal, the abbot of Phodong Monastery. Sidkeong Tulku Namgyal reconstructed the monastery.

After his education in Oxford, he returned to Sikkim where he was closely associated with the administration of the country. He worked to dissolve the greed that occurs in vested interests and tried to unify Buddhists by renovating monasteries and their roles.

When Alexandra David-Néel was invited to the royal monastery of Sikkim, she met Sidkeong Tulku Namgyal, at that time Maharaj Kumar (crown prince). She became Sidkeong's "confidante and spiritual sister".

== Engaged to Burmese princess ==
Sidkeong and Princess Hteiktin Ma Lat of Limbin then began a regular correspondence. Prince Limbin (Ma Lat's father) and his family soon returned to Burma (to live in Rangoon) and Sidkeong visited them there in 1912. By then they had agreed to get married, the British having secured Limbin's approval. The wedding was initially set for 1913 but then delayed because of the king of Sikkim Thutob Namgyal (Sidkeong's father's) deteriorating health. In February 1914 the old king died, Sidkeong became king, and his wedding to Ma Lat was set for 10 February 1915. The two exchanged many letters expressing their love for one another and how much they looked forward to a life together.

== Death ==
In December 1914, Sidkeong was found dead in his bedroom, apparently of heart failure, aged 35, in what the British described as 'mysterious circumstances'. He was succeeded by his younger brother, Tashi Namgyal. And was subsequently recognised as the reincarnate leader of Phodong.

== Honours ==
British Empire

- Delhi Durbar Medal, 1 January 1903.
- Delhi Durbar Medal, 11 December 1911.
- CIE: Companion of the Order of the Indian Empire, 12 December 1911.

== Ancestry ==
Ancestors of Sidkeong Tulku Namgyal

16. Phuntsog Namgyal, 5th Maharaja of Sikkim
8. Tenzing Namgyal, 6th Maharaja of Sikkim
17. a daughter of Deba Shamsher Khiti Phukpa
4. Tsugphud Namgyal, 7th Maharaja of Sikkim
18. Chandzod Karwang
9. Anyo Karwang
2. Sir Thutob Namgyal, 9th Maharaja of Sikkim
5. Maharani Menchi
1. Sidkeong Tulku Namgyal, 10th Maharaja of Sikkim
3. Maharani Pending

== Notes ==
Sidkeong Tulku Namgyal Namgyal Dynasty Born: 1879 Died: 5 December 1914
Regnal titles
Preceded by Thutob Namgyal	Chogyal of Sikkim; 11 February 1914 – 5 December 1914	Succeeded by Tashi Namgyal
