= LUMS =

LUMS or lums may refer to:

- Lahore University of Management Sciences
- London Universities Mooting Shield
- Lancaster University Management School
- Lum's - A defunct U.S. family restaurant chain
- Plural of lum
- Lums: The Game of Light and Shadows - A video game by Hyperbolic Magnetism
