= Singhik =

Singhik Sentam
- Town
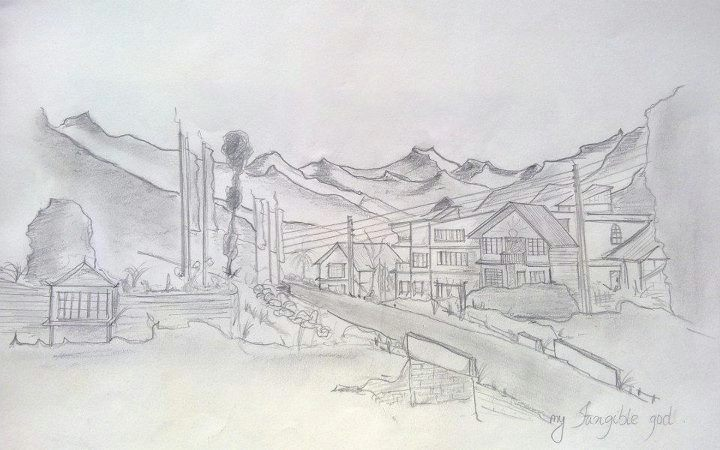

- Location in Sikkim, India Singhik (India)
- Coordinates: 27.52°N 88.57°E
- Country: India
- State: Sikkim
- District: Mangan
- Elevation: 1,560 m (5,120 ft)

Population (2011-12)
  - Total: 950 approx

Languages
  - Official: Sikkimese, Lepcha and Nepali
- Time zone: UTC+5:30 (IST)
- Postal code: 737116
- Vehicle registration: SK

Singhik is a town in Mangan district of the Indian state of Sikkim, it is situated four kilometres away from Mangan town, which serves as the district headquarters.

== Location ==
Singhik is about 70 km from the state capital, Gangtok, linked by a national highway passing the headquarters of North Sikkim District, Mangan, which is 4 km from the village.

== People ==
The people of Singhik represent three ethnic communities: the Lepcha, Nepali, and Bhutia. Lepcha comprise nearly 80% of the population.

== Geography ==
Singhik is located at 27.52°N 88.57°E. It has an average elevation of 1,560 metres (5,118 feet).
