= Scott Jennings (game designer) =

American MMORPG commentator

Scott Jennings (born c. 1966), also known as Lum the Mad, is an American commentator on MMORPG games. He is best known for creating a website, The Rantings of Lum The Mad, a pioneer blog, which existed from 1998 to 2001, when Jennings was hired by MMO developer Mythic Entertainment, where he remained until 2006.

== Biography ==
Jennings was born c. 1966, and began gaming at the age of 10, when he began playing Dungeons & Dragons. He created his first website to post tips and tricks about the 1996 game The Elder Scrolls II: Daggerfall. Around 1998/1999, his focus shifted to Ultima Online (UO), an early graphical MMO first released in 1997, and one of the first to become well known in popular culture. Jennings, whose primary career was as a database programmer, became a respected critic of UO, as he posted detailed critiques of the game. Jennings's strong views on "macroing" – the practice of automating aspects of the game, effectively making it easier – made him very popular with some UO players. As noted by game researcher Edward Castronova, this was an early example of a site where a game's designers had strong opposition from certain players, who would use their websites to actively critique a game's development. Jennings' writing was characterized by a mixture of humor and vitriolic anger, and his posts were known to readers as "rants". The site became frequented by both fans and haters of UO, along with some of UO's developers and personnel, as well as developers of competitor games.

With the 1999 release of a competitor to UO, EverQuest, Jennings expanded his writing to the new game. His early analysis of EQ focused on its differences to UO. However, he went on to criticize EverQuest directly. Jennings argued that the game forced players to spend long periods of time to gain very little, and that this was not fun. He also argued that the game consisted of fighting the same monsters repeatedly. He offered several examples of player greed, in his view, damaging the experience of the game for other players. Other issues he covered included "squatting" by large guilds, class balance, real-money trading, server lag, "raiding" as an end-game, and the later expansions' lack of finished and working content.

Jennings continued to write about a number of other MMORPGs as they were released, including Asheron's Call and Anarchy Online. His later works became even more elaborate, such as a mock-up event for Shadowbane created entirely with Warcraft II: Tides of Darkness sprites. Instead of the usual review article for World War II Online, he posted a long, profane and amusing chatlog of him testing the game offline, in which he proclaimed, "I WILL TAXI TO VICTORY!", a phrase which became a favorite among his fans.

Jennings' website attracted many well-known MMORPG staff and developers who took part in discussions on the forums. These included Richard Garriott, Raph Koster, and Mark Jacobs. Discussions often centered around the very virtual worlds they built, with much input from the community, both constructive and negative.

In 2001, when Jennings lost his job due to the dot-com crash, he was hired as a database programmer by Jacobs' company, Mythic Entertainment, makers of Dark Age of Camelot. He developed the Camelot Herald.

Once he began working for Mythic, Jennings decided he could not continue writing for his Lum the Mad site. It subsequently had its name changed to slownewsday.net and was maintained by volunteers for a time, but eventually closed.

Also in 2001, Jennings started a new blog, Broken Toys, which he infrequently updates about random subjects sometimes but not always relating to online gaming. Work from previous blogs is hosted in a separate archive.

In 2005, Jennings published the book Massively Multiplayer Games for Dummies.

On February 17, 2006, Jennings left Mythic and began working at another MMO company, NCsoft in Austin, Texas.

August 13, 2008 was Jennings' last day at NCsoft, having been let go as part of corporate refocusing. According to his blog, Jennings will begin working on a game called Webwars with John Galt Games.

In 2010 Jennings returned to NCsoft, first as a contract developer and then as a full-time employee. His employment with NCsoft ended in September, 2012.

He was employed at Portalarium until Jun 20, 2018.

== Personal life ==
Around 1995, Jennings married. He and his wife Pat have a son, Robert.

== Origin of name ==
Lum the Mad was the name of Jennings's Ultima Online characters. The original "Lum the Mad" was a character in the Greyhawk campaign setting for Dungeons & Dragons and was previously mentioned in the 2nd edition Advanced Dungeons and Dragons book "The Dungeon Master's Guide" in the artifact section referring to "The Machine of Lum the Mad".

In the game Baldur's Gate II: Throne of Bhaal, there is a machine built by one "Lum the Mad". This is an artifact originally described in the 1st Edition Advanced Dungeons & Dragons Dungeon Master's Guide. In the computer game this machine is found on the fourth level of the dungeon called "Watcher's Keep."

Lum the Mad is also referenced briefly at the finale of Planescape: Torment.

== Works ==
- "Lum the Mad" website, 1998–2001
- "Broken Toys" website, 2001–present
- Massively Multiplayer Games For Dummies, ISBN 0-471-75273-8, published December 5, 2005
