= Phodong =

- Town
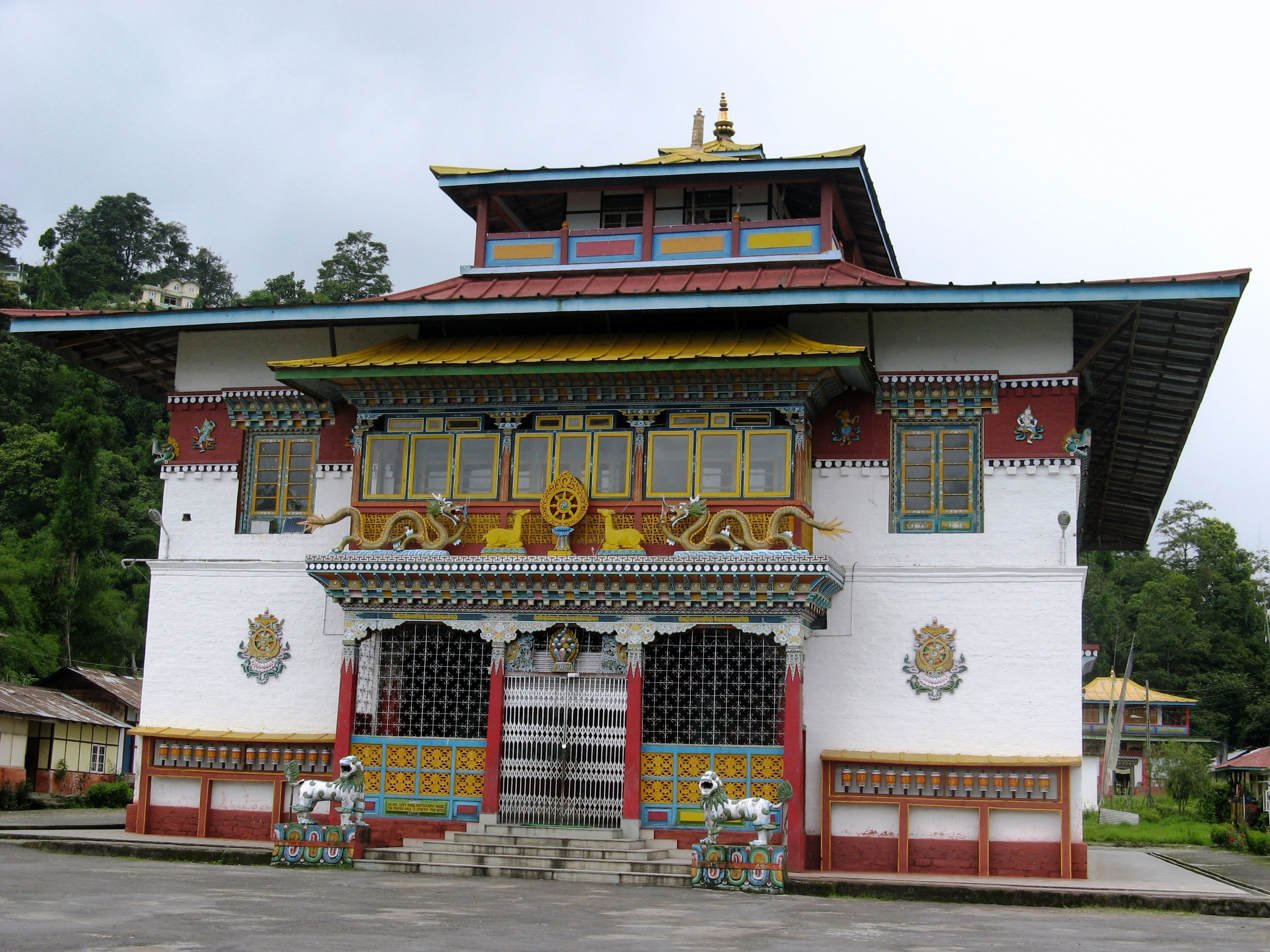
- Phodong Monastery

- Location in Sikkim, India Phodong (India)
- Coordinates: 27°24′30″N 88°34′14″E
- Country: India
- State: Sikkim
- District: North Sikkim

Languages
  - Official: Nepali, Bhutia, Lepcha, Limbu, Newari, Rai, Gurung, Mangar, Sherpa, Tamang and Sunwar
- Time zone: UTC+5:30 (IST)
- Vehicle registration: SK

Phodong is a town 38 kilometers north of Gangtok, the capital of the Indian state of Sikkim in North Sikkim district. Phodong is famous for the Phodong Monastery and the Labrang Monastery which is situated at a slightly higher altitude than the Phodong Monastery. The main occupation is farming on terraced slopes, though in recent years, tourism has contributed to the economy.

== Banking facilities in Phodong ==
State Bank of India is currently operating in one branch in Phodong town, North Sikkim District of Sikkim.

- State Bank Of India, Phodong
