= Lachen, Sikkim =

Lachen Lamten
- town
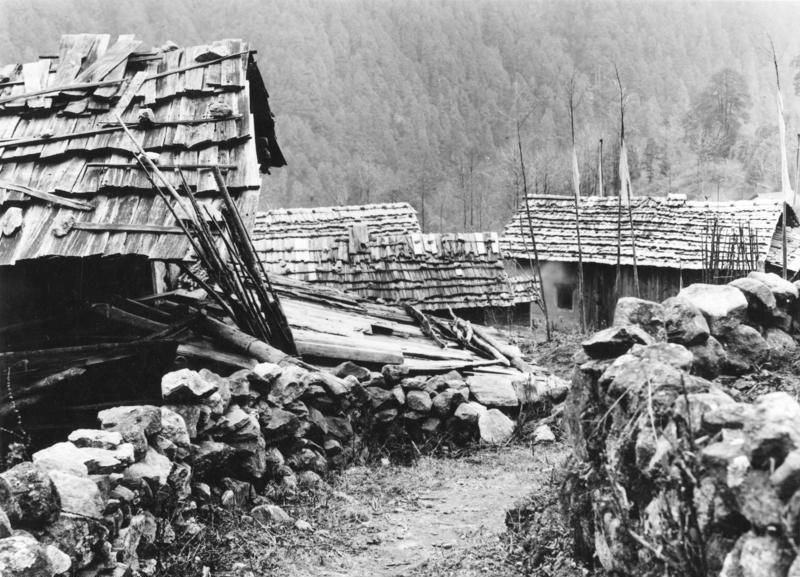
- Lachen village in 1938

- Location in Sikkim, India Lachen (India)
- Coordinates: 27.71668°N 88.557755°E
- Country: India
- State: Sikkim
- District: Mangan District
- Elevation: 2,600 m (8,500 ft)

Population (2011)
  - Total: 1,325

Languages
  - Official: Bhutia, Tibetan,
- Time zone: UTC+5:30 (IST)
- Vehicle registration: SK

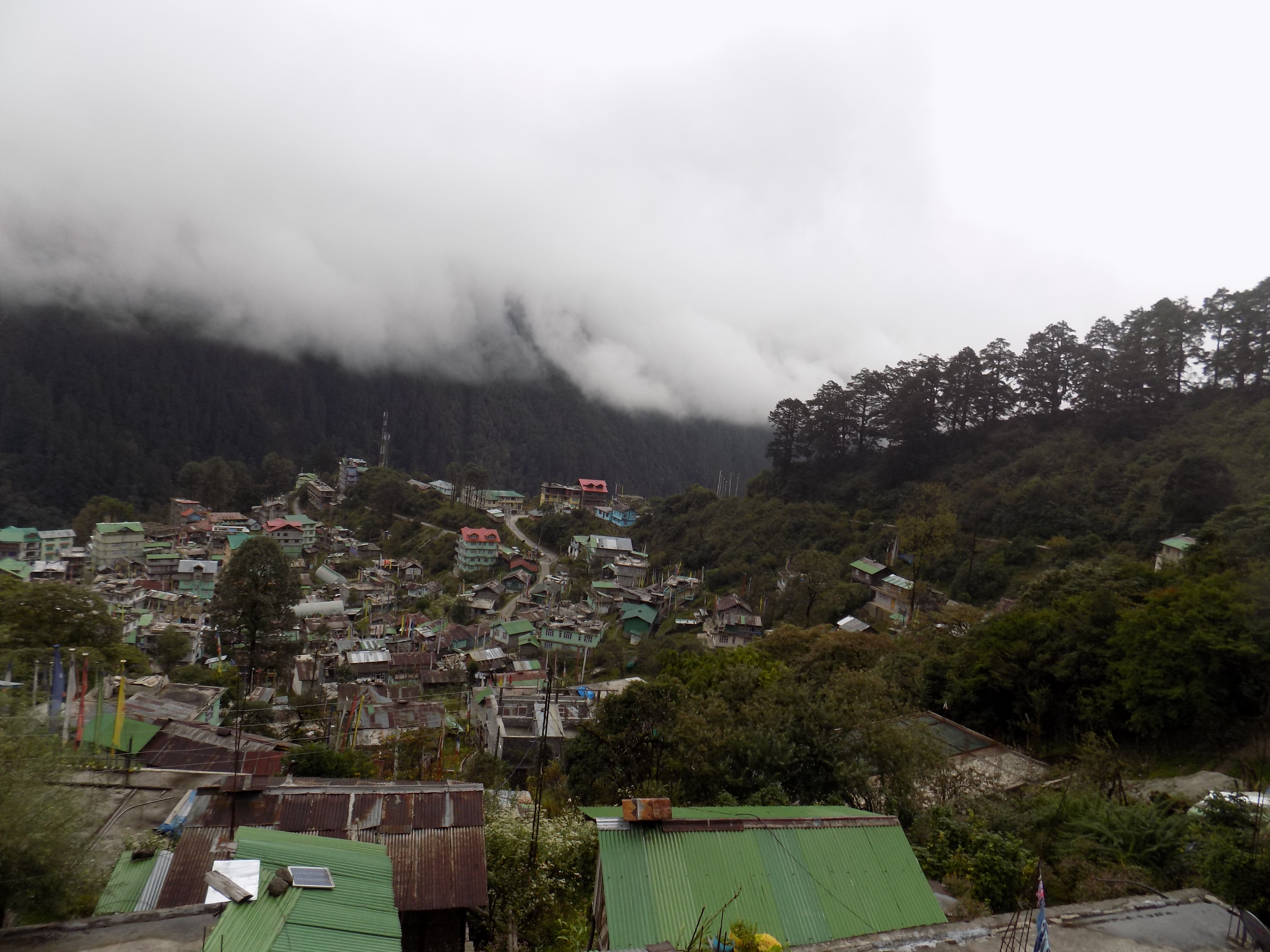
Lachen town

Lachen – The "Big Pass" of North Sikkim Lachen is a high-altitude town and hill station located in the Mangan district of Sikkim, India, near the Indo-Tibetan border. It serves as base for travel to Gurudongmar Lake. Approximately 50 km from Mangan and 129 km from Gangtok, Lachen sits at an elevation of about 9,600 feet (2,900 meters), near the confluence of the Lachen and Lachung Rivers—both tributaries of the Teesta. The name Lachen means "Big Pass."

== Unique Governance ==
Lachen is notable for its traditional self-governing system known as Dzumsa, a democratic village administration where every household has representation. This system manages local governance, resolves disputes, and organizes community activities, preserving age-old customs and social harmony.

== Tourism and Natural Attractions ==
Tourism has emerged as a key driver of the local economy, especially between October and May. Lachen is the base for visits to:

- Gurudongmar Lake – One of the world's highest lakes at 17,800 feet, surrounded by snow-capped mountains and considered sacred.
- Thangu Valley– Located 30 km north, it offers accommodation options and is adorned with wildflowers during the summer and monsoon.
- Chopta Valley – A relatively untouched region rich in alpine flora, rhododendrons, and pristine rivers. Known for its religious monuments and biodiversity, Chopta is ideal for trekking, birdwatching, and wildlife spotting.

== Culture and People ==
Lachen is primarily inhabited by Bhutia and Tibetan people'. Languages spoken include Nepali, Bhutia, and Tibetan. The town retains a peaceful, traditional charm with deep cultural roots. The nearby Lashar Valley is notable for the Dokpa community—the nomadic herdsmen of the high Himalayan passes who manage herds of Yak and celebrate the traditional Drukpa Tsechi festival, which features a local Yak race.

== Seasonal Beauty ==
- Autumn: Vibrant hues from maple and larch trees.
- Winter: Cold, dry, and snow-covered—ideal for snow lovers.
- Spring: Begins in late March with blooming flowers transforming the landscape into a colorful tapestry.

== Transport ==
Lachen is about 129 kilometres (80 mi) from the capital Gangtok, and can be reached via a six-hour road journey. A short two-day trekking route also connects the Yumthang Valley to Lachen. It has a population of around 1,000. Lachen has its own system of rules and regulations known as Dzumsa. The heads of the Dzumsa are known as Pipon and Gyenbos.

To the north, there is the old town of Thangu where the daytime temperature varies from 4 to 12 degrees Celsius (40 to 55 °F), even in the months of June and July.

Gurudongmar Lake can be reached from Lachen, a sacred lake in the Great Himalayas Region.

Lachen is connected with numerous routes in India. The most convenient ways to travel to Lachen are by air, rail, and road.

== Banking Facilities in Lachen ==
As per RBI records only Axis Bank and SBI Bank presently have a branch in Lachen:

- Axis Bank Lachen
- State Bank of India
