= Phodong Monastery =

Buddhist monastery in Sikkim, India

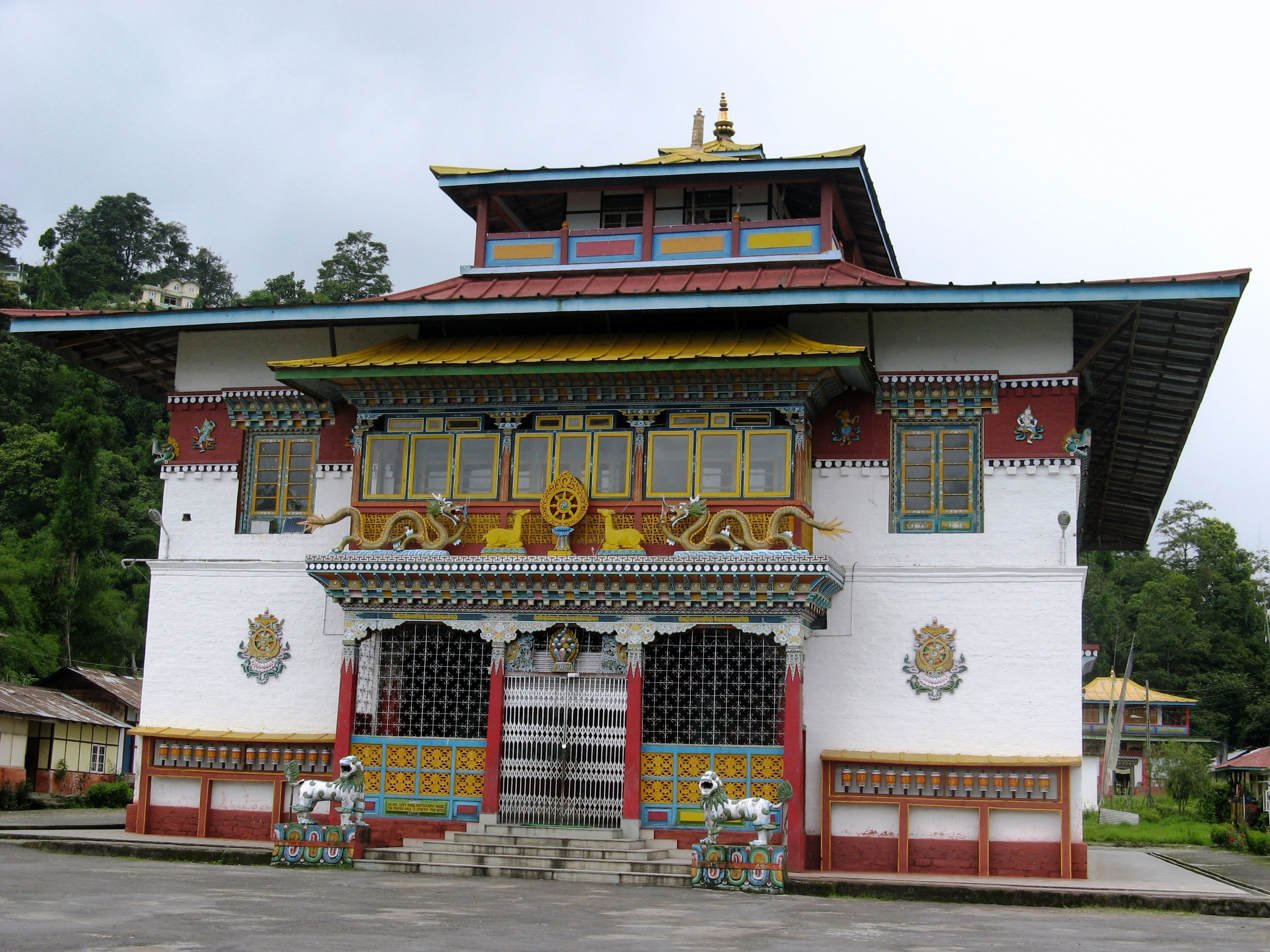
- Phodong Monastery

- Location within India

Religion
- Affiliation: Tibetan Buddhism
- Sect: Kagyupa
- Festivals: Chaam Dance (28 and 29th of the 10th month)

Location
- Location: Sikkim, India
- Interactive map of Phodong Monastery
- Coordinates: 27°24′46″N 88°35′02″E

Architecture
- Style: Current building early 18th century
- Founder: Chogyal Gyurmed Namgyal
- Established: 1740; 286 years ago

Phodong Monastery (or Phodang and Podong; Tibetan: ཕོ་གདོང, Wylie: pho gdong) is a Buddhist monastery in Sikkim, India. It is located 28 kilometres from Gangtok. It was built in the early 18th century but an older monastery had pre-existed the current one.

9th Karmapa was invited by the king of Sikkim, where he founded three monasteries : Rumtek, one of the most important monastery of the Karma Kagyu school of Tibetan Buddhism, Phodong and Ralang Monastery.

It was reconstructed by Sidkeong Tulku Namgyal, who was recognized as the reincarnation of his uncle, Sidkeong Namgyal, the abbot of the monastery. The line was to be continued by Palden Thondup Namgyal.

The monastery has a residence of approximately 260 monks and has a numerous collection of some ancient murals.
