= Mangan, India =

Mangan
- Town
- Location of Mangan in Sikkim Mangan (India)
- Coordinates: 27°30′1.149″N 88°32′3.598″E
- Country: India
- State: Sikkim
- District: Mangan

Government
  - Type: Nagar Panchayat
  - Body: Mangan Nagar Panchayat
- Elevation: 956 m (3,136 ft)

Population (2011)
  - Total: 4,644

Languages
  - Official: English; Nepali; Sikkimese; Lepcha
  - Additional official: Gurung; Limbu; Magar; Mukhia; Newari; Rai; Sherpa; Tamang
- Time zone: UTC+5:30 (IST)
- PIN: 737116
- Vehicle registration: SK-03

Mangan is a town and the headquarter of the district of Mangan District in the Indian state of Sikkim. The town lying near River Teesta is connected to the capital Gangtok by a metalled road. Mangan District is the largest district of Sikkim in terms of area. The town lies in the geographic south of the district. After the opening up of the district, Mangan has witnessed a spurt in its economy, mostly due to organic farming. The town opens up the Tibetan Plateau. Mangan also serves the towns of Lachung, Chungthang and Lachen in the far north. Owing to its elevation, the town enjoys a temperate climate.

== Geography ==
Mangan is located at 27.52°N 88.53°E. It has an average elevation of 956 metres (3136 feet).

== Demographics ==
As of the 2011 Census of India, Mangan had a population of 4644. Males constitute 55% of the population and females 45%. Mangan has an average literacy rate of 83.81%, higher than the state average of 81.42%: male literacy is 87.80%, and female literacy is 79.34% in Mangan.

=== Religion ===
Religious Demographic in Mangan Nagar Panchayat (2011)
1. Hinduism (44.9%)
2. Buddhism (37.9%)
3. Islam (9.52%)
4. Christianity (7.24%)
5. Others (0.33%)

=== Languages ===
Languages spoken in Mangan Nagar Panchayat (2011)
1. Nepali (40.1%)
2. Lepcha (15.3%)
3. Hindi (10.9%)
4. Bhutia (10.5%)
5. Bhojpuri (10.0%)
6. Bengali (3.18%)
7. Sherpa (2.95%)
8. Limbu (2.41%)
9. Urdu (2.34%)
10. Others (2.30%)

== Banking Facilities ==
The following Banks provide banking facilities in Mangan Town, Mangan district of Sikkim:

- Central Bank of India, Mangan
- Canara Bank, Mangan
- IDBI Bank, Mangan
- State Bank Of India, Mangan
- Union Bank of India, Mangan
- Uco Bank, Mangan
