= List of districts of Sikkim =

Districts of Sikkim
- Districts of Sikkim
- Category: Districts
- Location: Sikkim
- Number: 6 districts
- Populations: Highest: Gangtok (281,293), Lowest: Mangan (43,354).
- Areas: Largest: Mangan - 4,226 km^{2} (1,632 sq mi), Smallest: Soreng - 293 km^{2} (113 sq mi).
- Government: Government of Sikkim

There are 6 districts in Sikkim, an Indian state, each overseen by a Central Government appointee, the district collector, who is in charge of the administration of the civilian areas of the districts. The Indian army has control of a large territory, as the state is a sensitive border area. Many areas are restricted and permits are needed to visit them. There are a total of eight towns and nine subdivisions in Sikkim.

== History ==
Following the merger of Kingdom of Sikkim with India in 1975 when Sikkim became 22nd state of India, original four districts were formally established in at same time. On 21 December 2021, the Government of Sikkim announced the formation of 2 new districts as well as the renaming of the existing 4 districts - North Sikkim district to Mangan; West Sikkim district to Gyalshing, East Sikkim district to Gangtok district, and South Sikkim to Namchi district. The Pakyong subdivision of East Sikkim district was carved out to form Pakyong district and the Soreng subdivision was carved out from West Sikkim district to form Soreng district.

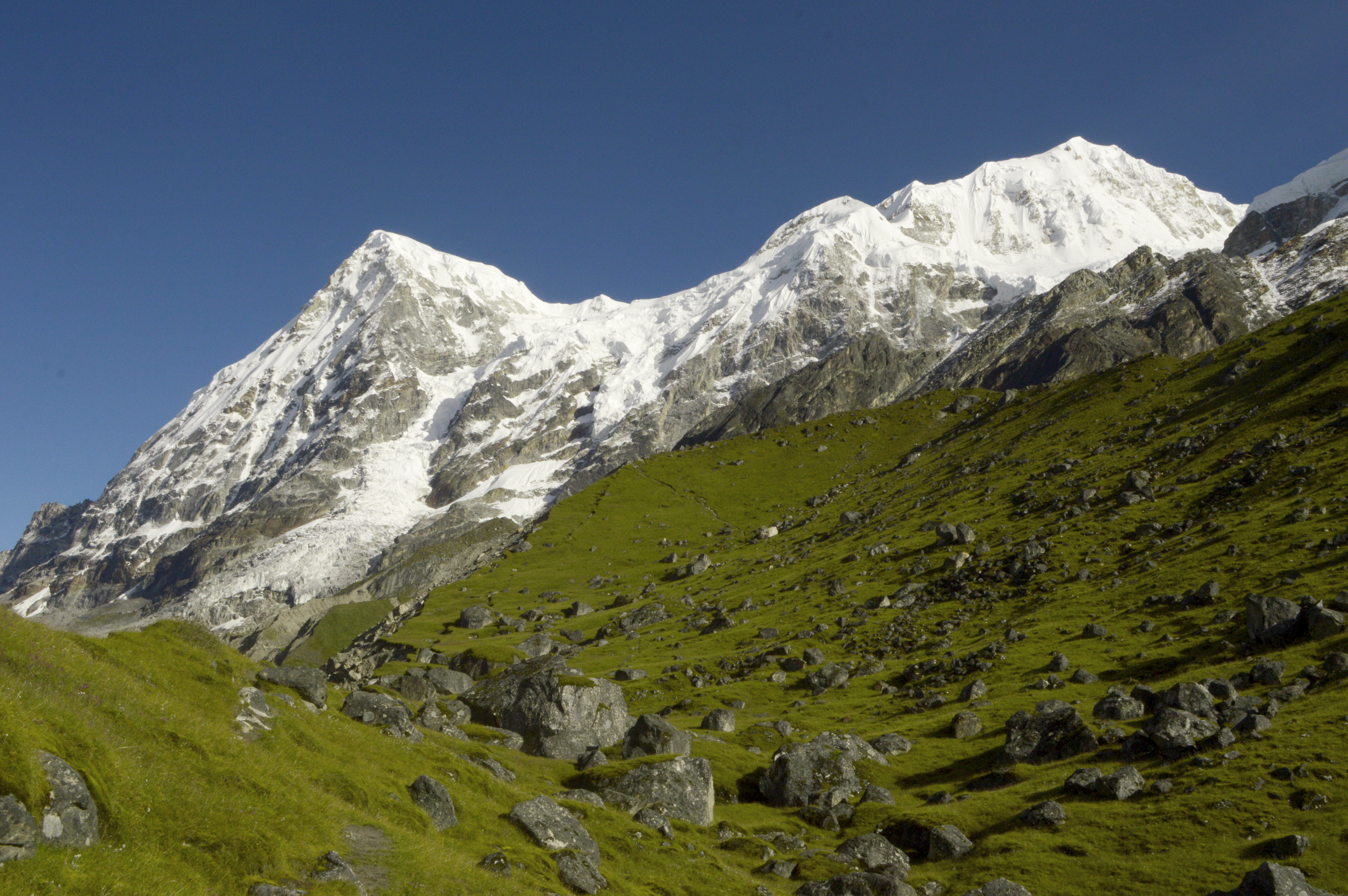
Khangchendzonga National Park is located in Mangan district.

== List of districts ==
Sl no.	Code	District	Headquarters	Established	Area	Population (2011)	Population density	Official website	Map
1	ES	Gangtok	Gangtok	1975	954 km²	281,293	295/km²	gangtokdistrict.nic.in	
2	WS	Gyalshing	Gyalshing	1975	1,166 km²	136,299	117/km²	gyalshing.nic.in	
3	NS	Mangan	Mangan	1975	4,226 km²	43,354	10/km²	mangan.nic.in	
4	SS	Namchi	Namchi	1975	750 km²	146,742	196/km²	namchi.nic.in	
5	PS	Pakyong	Pakyong	2021	404 km²	74,583	180/km²	pakyongdistrict.nic.in	
6	SGS	Soreng	Soreng	2021	293 km²	64,760	221/km²	soreng.nic.in	
—	Total	6	Gangtok	1975	7,096 km²	610,577	86/km²	sikkim.nic.in	

== Demands for new districts ==
Proposals for administrative reorganization in Sikkim are primarily based on factors such as geostrategic border management (including proximity to the Siliguri Corridor), disaster management requirements (such as following the 2023 Sikkim flash floods), and the need for decentralized administration in remote areas to improve public service delivery.

List of Proposed Districts in Sikkim Grouped by Current District
Proposed District	Expected Area of Jurisdiction	Rationale for Creation
Proposed from Gyalshing
Dentam	Western part of Gyalshing district, bordering Nepal. Expected to include the Dentam sub-division, the Maneybong-Dentam constituency, 3 revenue circles (Uttarey, Dentam, and Hee-Gaon), and approximately 15 to 18 revenue blocks.	Proposed by local representatives to reduce travel time to the Gyalshing headquarters and improve administrative capacity in the western border region.
Proposed from Mangan
Chungthang	Northern alpine region of Mangan district, bordering Tibet. Expected to include the Chungthang sub-division, the northern portion of the Lachen-Mangan constituency, 3 revenue circles (Chungthang, Lachen, and Lachung), and 12 to 14 revenue blocks.	Driven by the region's high-risk profile for natural disasters, such as the 2023 glacial floods. Proponents argue that district-level administration is necessary for rapid emergency response and border management.
Proposed from Pakyong
Rongli-Rhenock	East-southeast and southwest parts of Pakyong district, near the India-Tibet-Bhutan tri-junction. Expected to include the Rongli sub-division, Rhenock and Chujachen constituencies, 3 revenue circles (Rongli, Subaneydara, and Rhenock), and over 20 revenue blocks.	Demanded to provide focused economic and administrative governance for the eastern industrial belt.
Proposed from Gangtok
Sang-Rabdang	Western part of Gangtok district. Expected to include the Sang-Rabdang sub-division, serving the Singtam-Khamdong and Martam-Rumtek constituencies, encompassing 3 revenue circles (Rabdang, Khamdong, and Tumin) and 22 revenue blocks.	Elevated to sub-divisional status in 2024, further demands seek full district status to decentralize administration from the state capital region.

== See also ==
- History of Sikkim
