= Mangan district =

- District of Sikkim
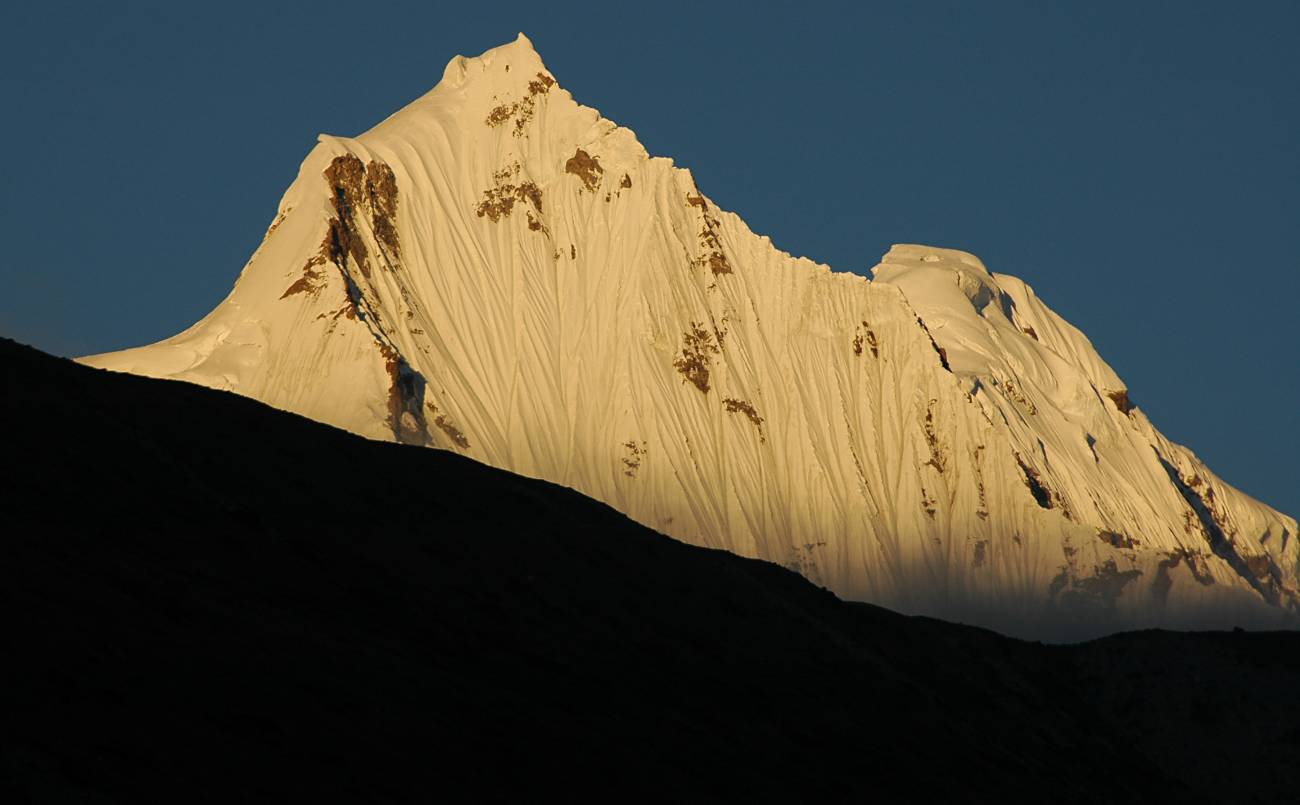
- Kangchengyao in Mangan district, Sikkim
- Interactive map of Mangan district
- Coordinates: 27°31′N 88°32′E
- Country: India
- State: Sikkim
- Headquarters: Mangan

Government
  - District Collector (DC): Mr. Anant Jain

Area
  - Total: 4,226 km^{2} (1,632 sq mi)
- Elevation: 610 m (2,000 ft)

Population (2011)
  - Total: 43,709
  - Density: 10.34/km^{2} (26.79/sq mi)
- Time zone: UTC+05:30 (IST)
- ISO 3166 code: IN-SK
- Vehicle registration: SK-03
- Website: mangan.nic.in

Mangan district, formerly known as North Sikkim district, is a district of the Indian state of Sikkim. Its district headquarters is Mangan. It is the seventh least populous district in the country (out of 640).

== Geography ==
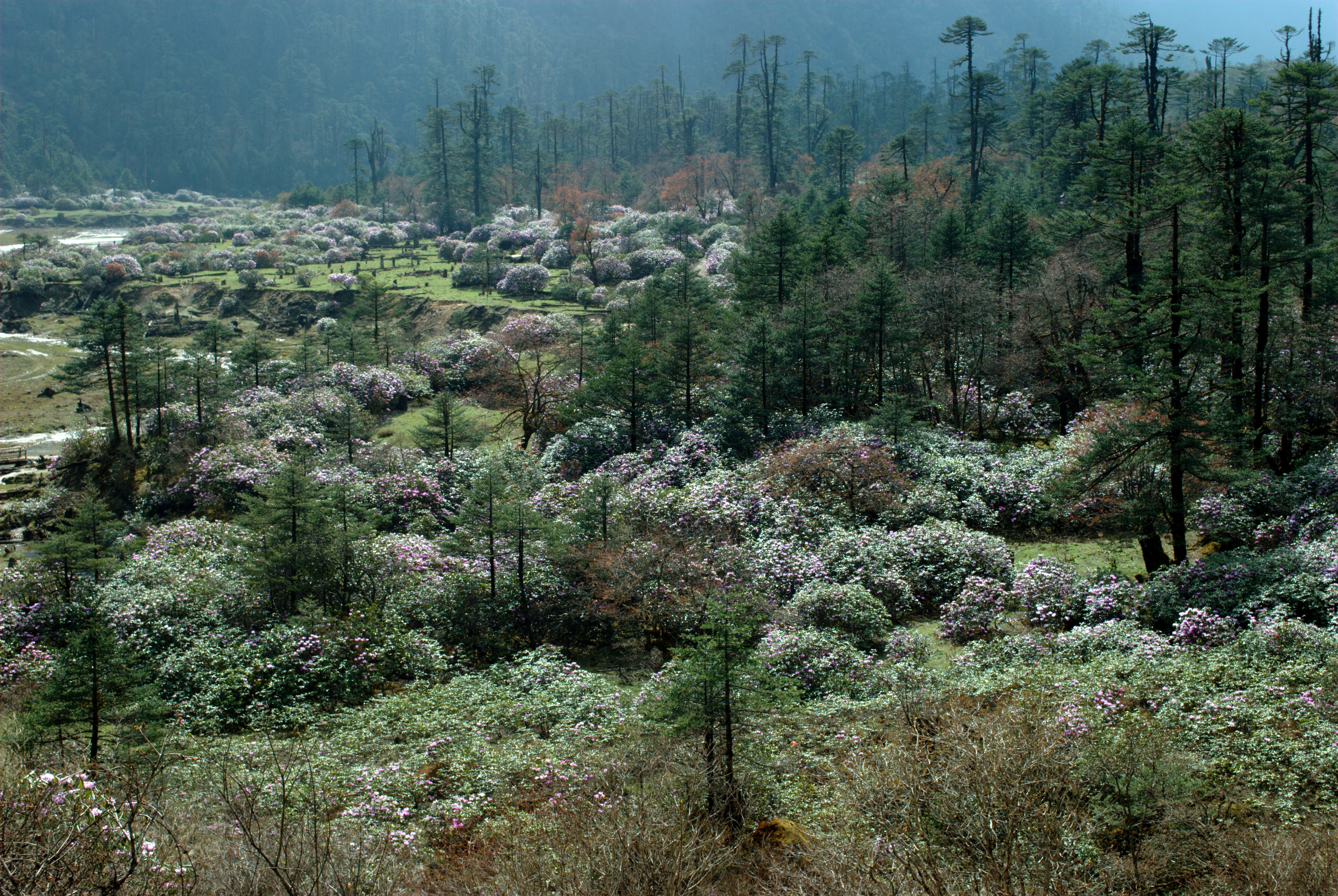
Wildflowers of North Sikkim

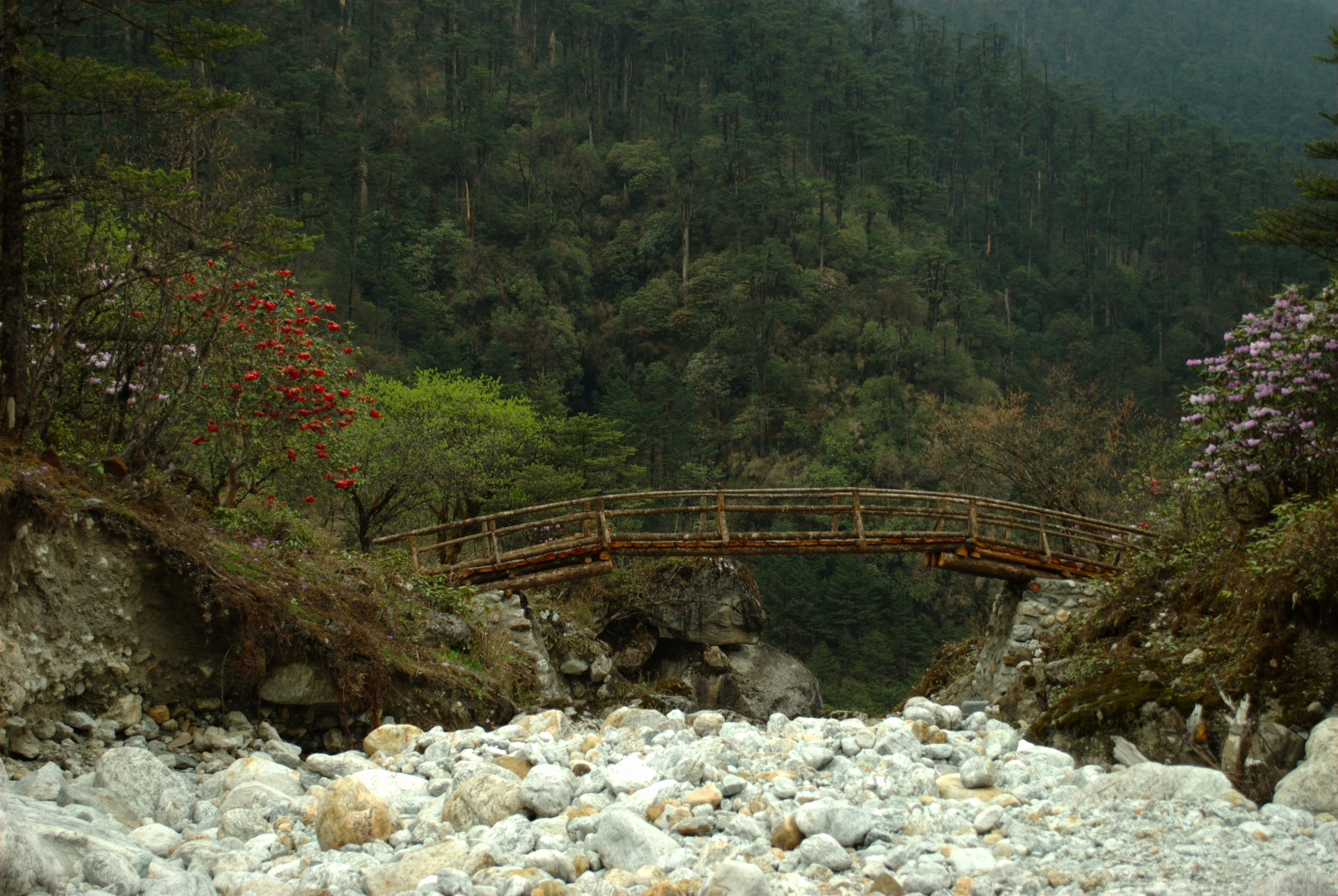
Flowering trees along stream valleys

Mangan is the largest of the six districts of Sikkim. The landscape is mountainous with dense vegetation all the way up to the alpine altitude before thinning out to desert scrub towards the northern tundra. Numerous waterfalls astride the main road make the trip to this district extremely picturesque.

The most prominent effect of the steepness of the valleys is the prevalence of landslides that at times drop debris anything between 3,000 and 5,000 ft (900 and 1,500 m) carrying devastation along their course. Most of them are caused either by melting snow beds on top of the mountains or by erosive action of monsoon rains.

Most of the people of the state reside near Mangan, the district headquarters which is about 3,000 feet (900 m) above sea level. Further north the elevation increases with the vegetation turning from temperate to alpine to tundra. Temperatures range from about 25 °C (77 °F) to below −40 °C (−40 °F) in the extreme high reaches where the altitude is in excess of 6,000 metres or 20,000 feet. Kanchenjunga is the highest peak at over 8,000 metres or 26,000 feet, straddling its western border with Nepal and can be seen clearly from the town of Singhik.

=== Assembly constituencies ===
Since 2002, the district has been divided into three assembly constituencies.

1. Kabi Lungchok (BL)
2. Djongu (BL)
3. Lachen-Mangan (BL)

== Economy ==
Mangan is known as the Large Cardamom Capital of the world. The climate and terrain best suit the cultivation of the larger variety of Cardamom here.

The region has many power projects and enjoys almost uninterrupted electricity. The steep gradient and the innumerable lakes on the higher reaches facilitate ideal conditions for generation of hydro electric power.

In 2006 the Ministry of Panchayati Raj named North Sikkim one of the country's 250 most backward districts (out of a total of 640). It is the only district in Sikkim currently receiving funds from the Backward Regions Grant Fund Programme (BRGF).

=== Tourism ===
Most of North Sikkim is restricted to travellers and permits are needed to visit these areas. The area, which shares a sensitive border with the People's Republic of China is heavily patrolled by the Indian army. However, owing to the natural environment and scenery, a large number of tourists have started visiting the region. Often unregulated tourism becomes a conservation issue in fragile ecosystem such as high mountains.

== Divisions ==
=== Administrative divisions ===
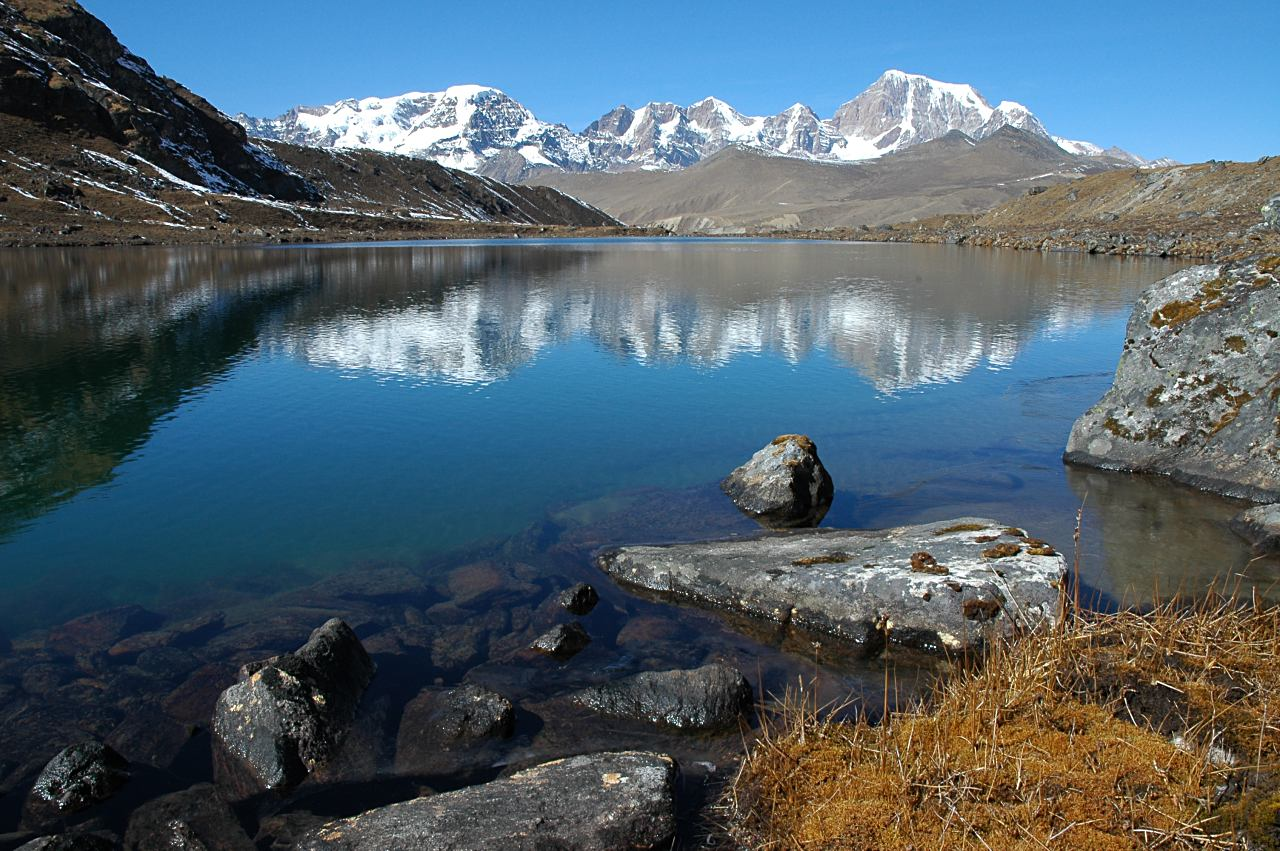
Crows Lake

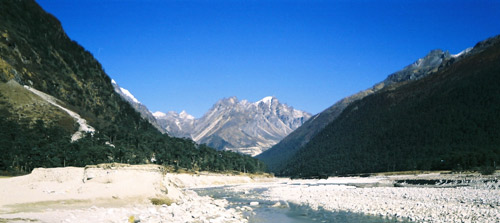
Yumthang Valley

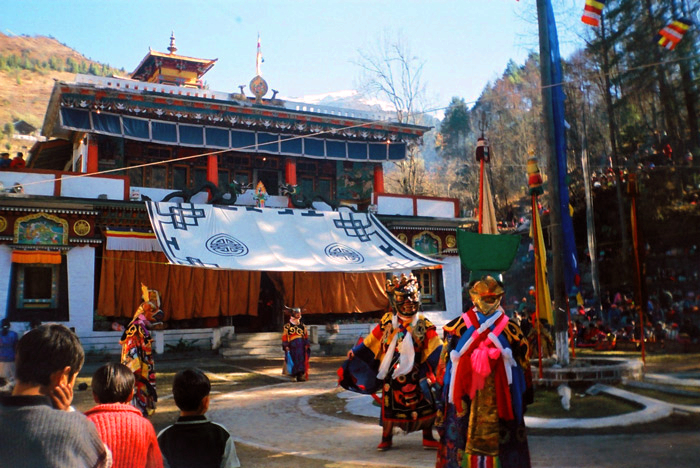
Gumpa dance at Lachung monastery

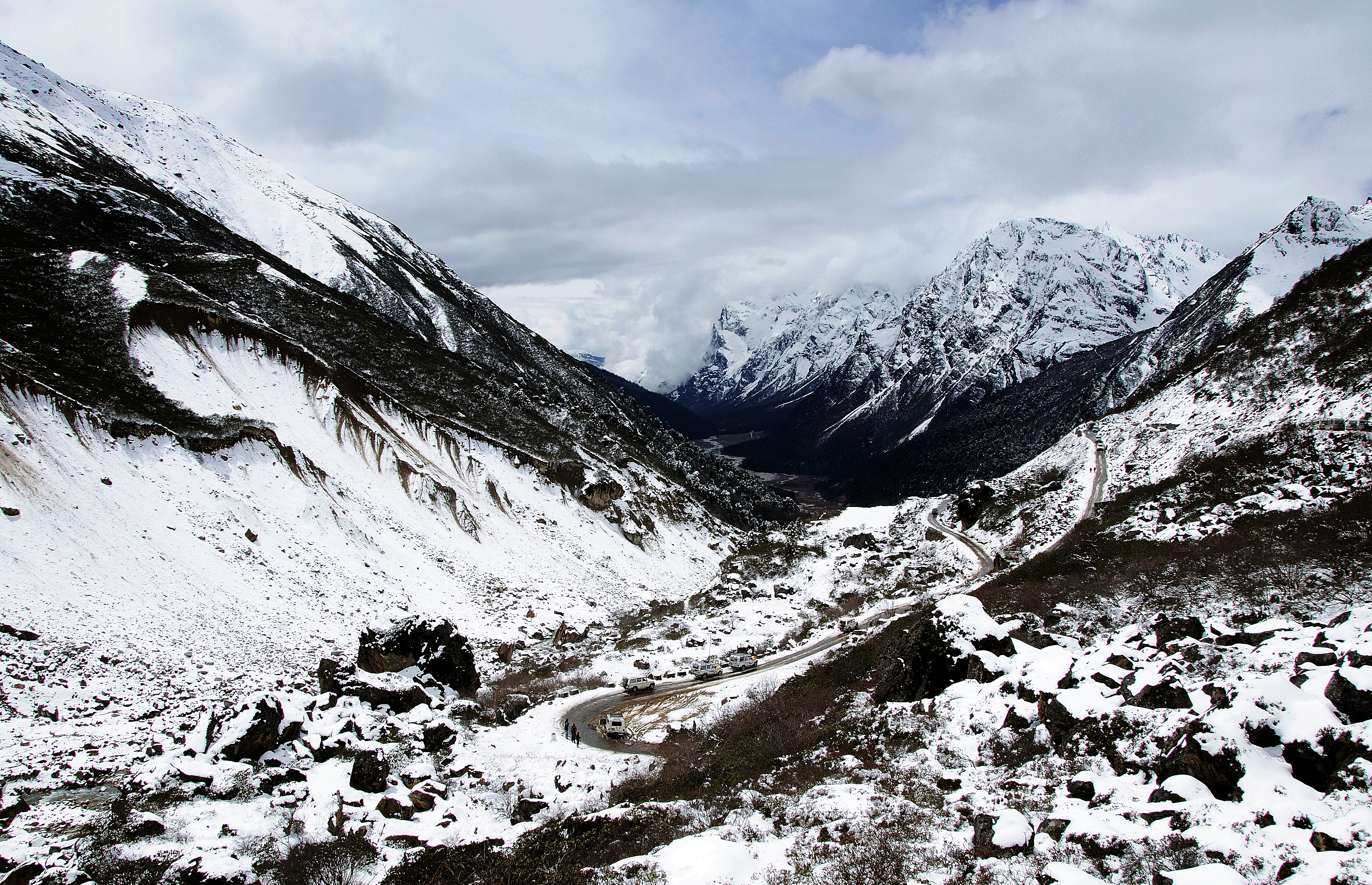
View from Zero Point, North Sikkim

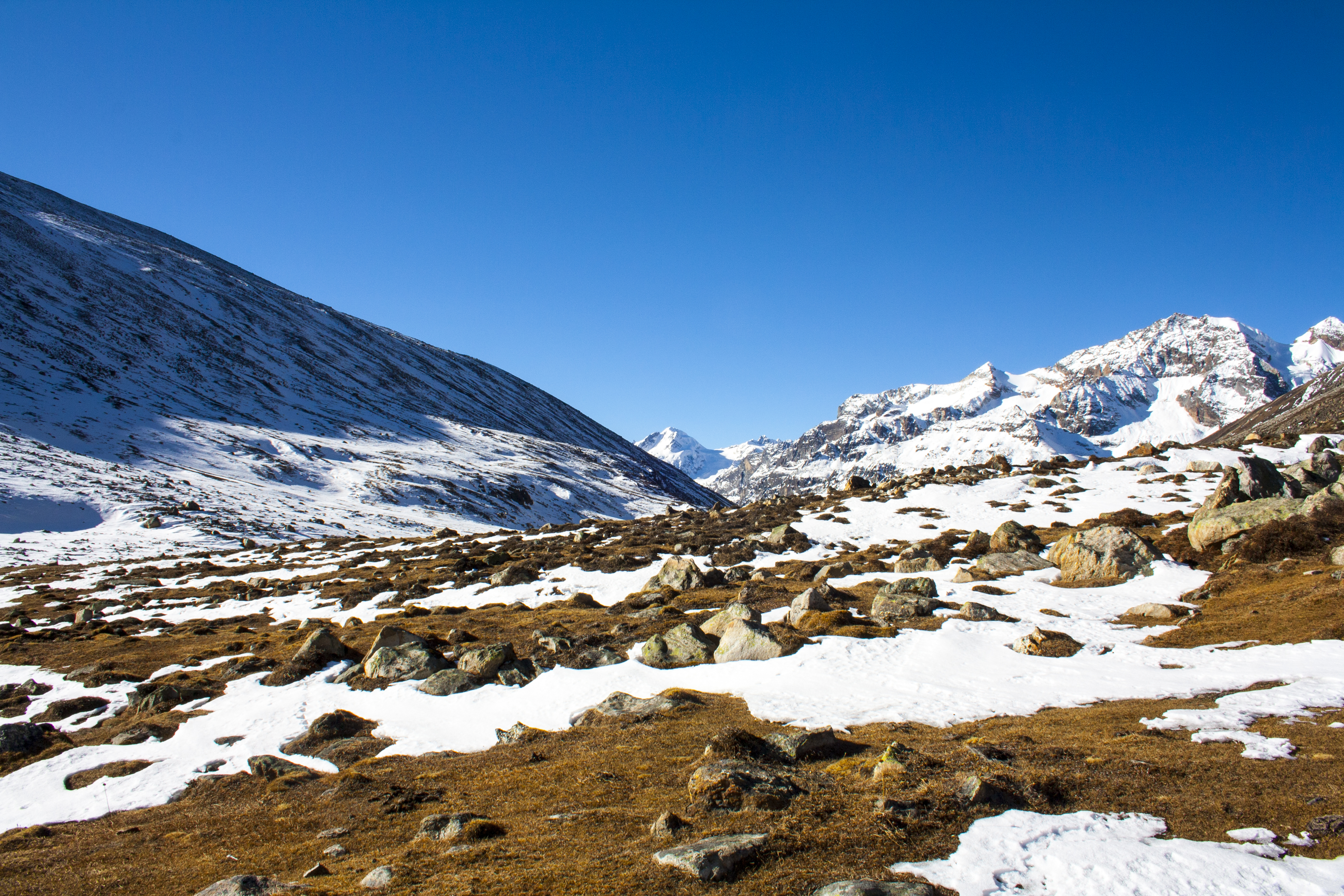
Zero Point Sikkim – After Earthquake, November 2011

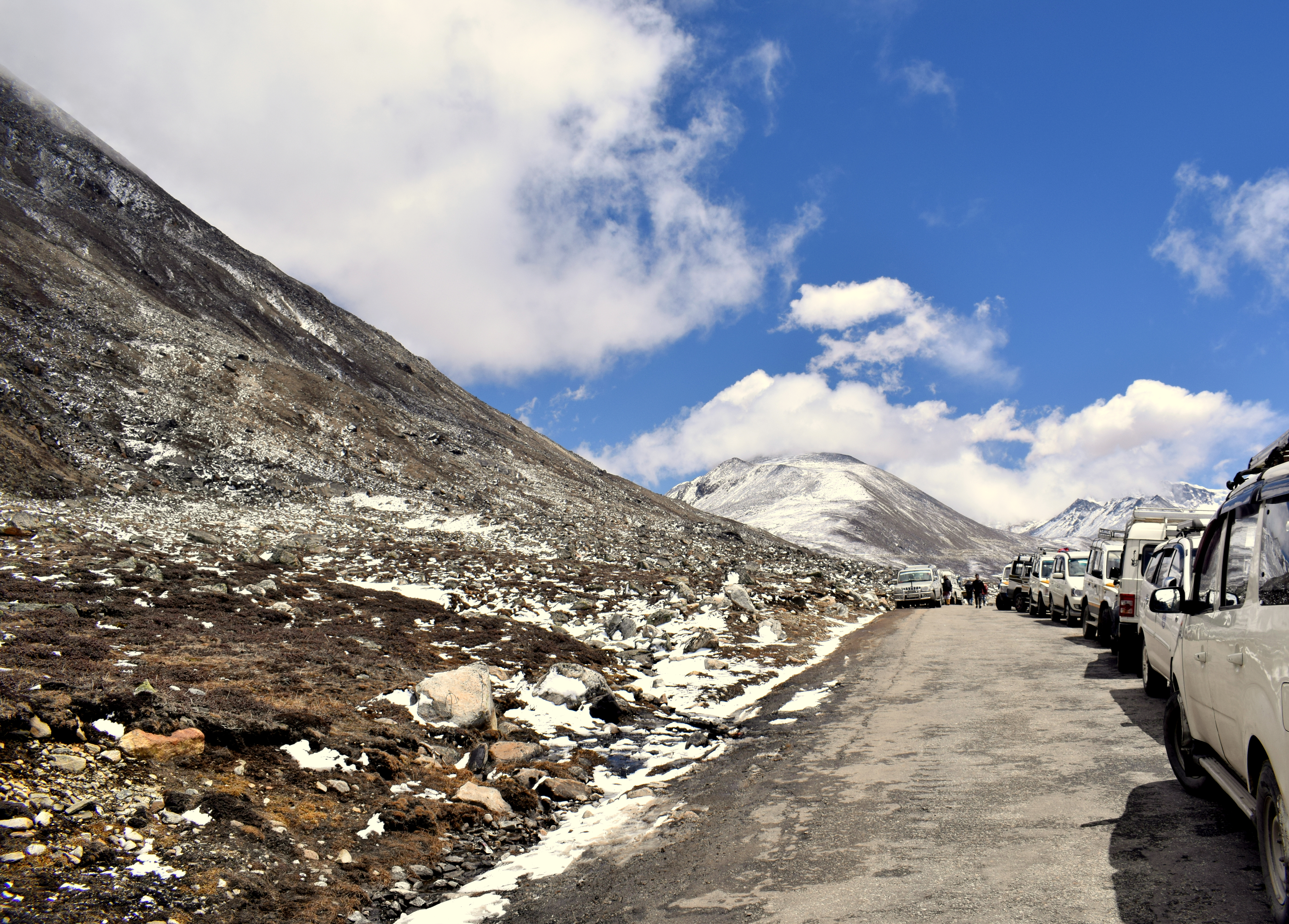
Yumesamdong, Zero Point, North Sikkim

Scenes from the district

North Sikkim is divided into two sub-divisions:

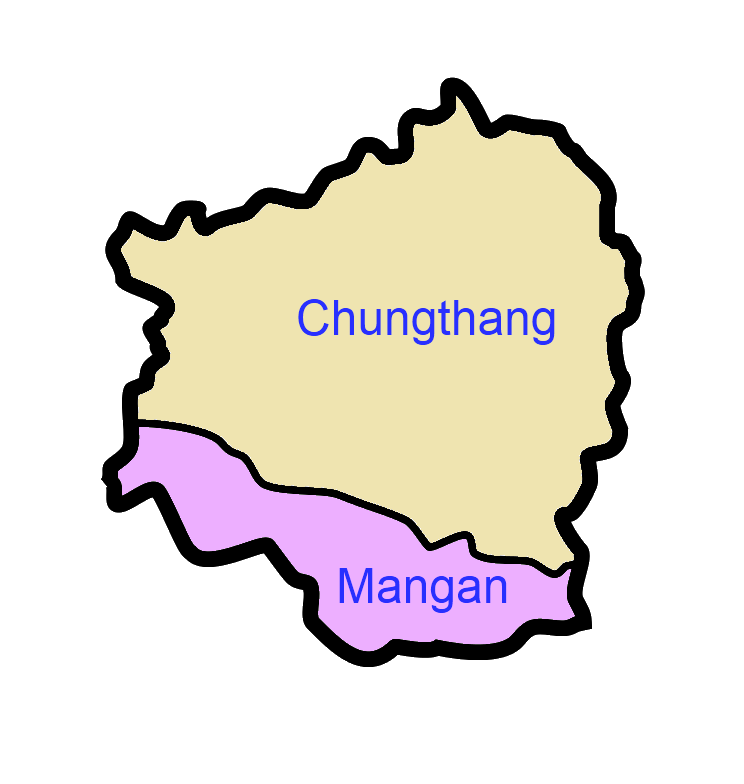
A clickable map of North Sikkim exhibiting its two subdivisions.

| Name | Headquarters | Number of villages | Population (2011) | Area | Location |
| Chungthang | Chungthang | 9 | 10,038 | 3,285 | |
| Mangan | Mangan | 46 | 33,671 | 941 | |

== Demographics ==
According to the 2011 census Mangan district has a population of 43,709, roughly equal to the nation of Liechtenstein. This gives it a ranking of 634th in India (out of a total of 640). The district has a population density of 10 inhabitants per square kilometre (26/sq mi). Its population growth rate over the decade 2001–2011 was 5.66%. North Sikkim has a sex ratio of 769 females for every 1000 males, and a literacy rate of 77.39%. 10.62% of the population lives in urban areas. Scheduled Castes and Scheduled Tribes make up 2.25% and 65.70% of the population respectively.

The people are mainly of Lepcha and Bhutia descent. Other groups include the Tibetan community. It also has one of the lowest populated regions of the state.

=== Religion ===
Religion in Mangan district (2011)
| Buddhism | 53.35% |
| Hinduism | 34.05% |
| Christianity | 6.09% |
| Kirat Mundhum | 2.11% |
| Sikhism | 1.87% |
| Islam | 1.86% |
| Other or not stated | 0.67% |

Buddhism is followed by majority of the people in Mangan district. Hinduism followed by a considerable population.

=== Languages ===
Languages of Mangan (2011)
1. Lepcha (31.7%)
2. Nepali (23.2%)
3. Sikkimese (14.4%)
4. Limbu (8.51%)
5. Hindi (6.40%)
6. Sherpa (3.63%)
7. Tamang (2.56%)
8. Punjabi (1.75%)
9. Bhojpuri (1.62%)
10. Rai (1.22%)
11. Bengali (1.08%)
12. Others (3.87%)

At the time of the 2011 Census of India, 31.71% of the population in the district spoke Lepcha, 23.24% Nepali, 14.41% Sikkimese, 8.51% Limbu, 6.40% Hindi, 3.63% Sherpa, 2.56% Tamang, 1.75% Punjabi, 1.62% Bhojpuri, 1.22% Rai and 1.08% Bengali as their first language.

== Transport ==
Roads are in a poor condition owing to the frequent landslides.

== Flora and fauna ==
North Sikkim is home to the red panda (Ailurus fulgens), a vulnerable species. This animal is the pride of Sikkim and is also the State Animal. It is generally found between heights of 2000 m to 4000 m. It is as big as a domestic Siamese cat (approximately 2 ft long), has a triangular shaped face with a stripe on its cheek, with red fur and black eyes. It has a sprinkling of white on its back and chest. The tail is bushy, black or brown in colour and long like that of a skunk. They generally live on treetops.

In 1977 North Sikkim district became home to Khangchendzonga National Park, which has an area of 1,784 km^{2} (688.8 mi^{2}). It shares the park with West Sikkim district. It is also home to the Shingba (rhododendron) Wildlife Sanctuary, which was established in 1984 and has an area of 43 km^{2} (16.6 mi^{2}).

== Important Towns and Cities ==
- Mangan
- Chungthang
- Lachen
- Lachung
- Phodong
- Dikchu
