= Birdang =

Kamling
- Village
- Location in Sikkim, India Kamling (India)
- Coordinates: 27.191°N 88.312°E
- Country: India
- State: Sikkim
- District: Soreng
- Elevation: 1,246 m (4,088 ft)

Languages
  - Official: Nepali, Bhutia, Lepcha, Limbu, Newari, Rai, Gurung, Mangar, Sherpa, Tamang and Sunwar
- Time zone: UTC+5:30 (IST)
- PIN: 737 121
- Vehicle registration: SK
- Nearest city: Naya Bazar
- Sex ratio: 989 ♂/♀
- Literacy: 84.78%
- Vidhan Sabha constituency: Rinchenpong
- Climate: sub tropical to alpine (Köppen)

Birdang is a small village located in between Legship and Jorethang, under Soreng sub division at the West district of Sikkim state in India. This village is about 50 m above sea level with a tropical climate. It is just 10 kilometer far away from Jorethang. In electoral roll of 2011, Birdang comes under the Assembly Constituency of Rinchenpong.

== Etymology ==
The meaning of "KAMLING SULDUNG" comes from two different languages. KAM in Bhutia language means "DRY" and "SULDUNG" in lepcha language means "JAMMUNA TREE" which is found in abundance in dry area. both the meaning signifies the dryness of the land.

== Population composition ==
Nepali-speaking people comprising Chettri, Rai, Mangar, Limboo-Subba, Lepcha, Darjee and Sunar constitutes the majority of the population at Lower Kamling.

== Economy ==
People are mainly engaged in primary sector like house farming, Agriculture, pitty business, Horticulture etc. Most of the youngsters are away from the village because of their job. Youngsters from the village are engaged in Private & Govt. sector in Capital city Gangtok and some other states as well as abroad for their studies & job. There is a Government school too in the middle of the village. People engaged in agriculture produce as their main crops every year is Pulses (Dal), Maize (Makkai), millet (Kodho), Ginger (Adhuwa), vegetables products & less quantity turmeric (Hardi).

== Demographics ==
As of 2011 India census, Birdang had a total 230 household and a population of 1247. Males population counts at 641 individuals and females 606 respectively. It has an average literacy rate of 71.51%, lower than the state average of 81.42%: male literacy is 72.76%, and female literacy is 70.22%. In Kamling village population of children with age 0-6 is 166 which makes up 13.31% of total population of village.

The Sex Ratio of Kamling village is 945 which is higher than Sikkim state average of 890. Child Sex Ratio for the Kamling as per census is 766, lower than Sikkim average of 957.

Schedule Tribe (ST) constitutes 21.41% while Schedule Caste (SC) were 9.30% of total population in Kamling village.

== Work Profile of the Village ==
In Kamling village out of total population, 578 were engaged in work activities. 98.96% of workers describe their work as Main Work (Employment or Earning more than 6 Months) while 1.04% were involved in Marginal activity providing livelihood for less than 6 months. Of 578 workers engaged in Main Work, 169 were cultivators (owner or co-owner) while 260 were Agricultural labourer.
