= Hinduism in Sikkim =

Hinduism is the dominant religion in the Indian state of Sikkim, followed by around 58% of its population. Its followed mostly by the Indian Gorkha ethnic people and Limboo people. The Kirateshwar Mahadev Temple is a major Hindu pilgrimage centre in Sikkim. In Hindu religious texts, Sikkim is known as Indrakil, the garden of Indra.

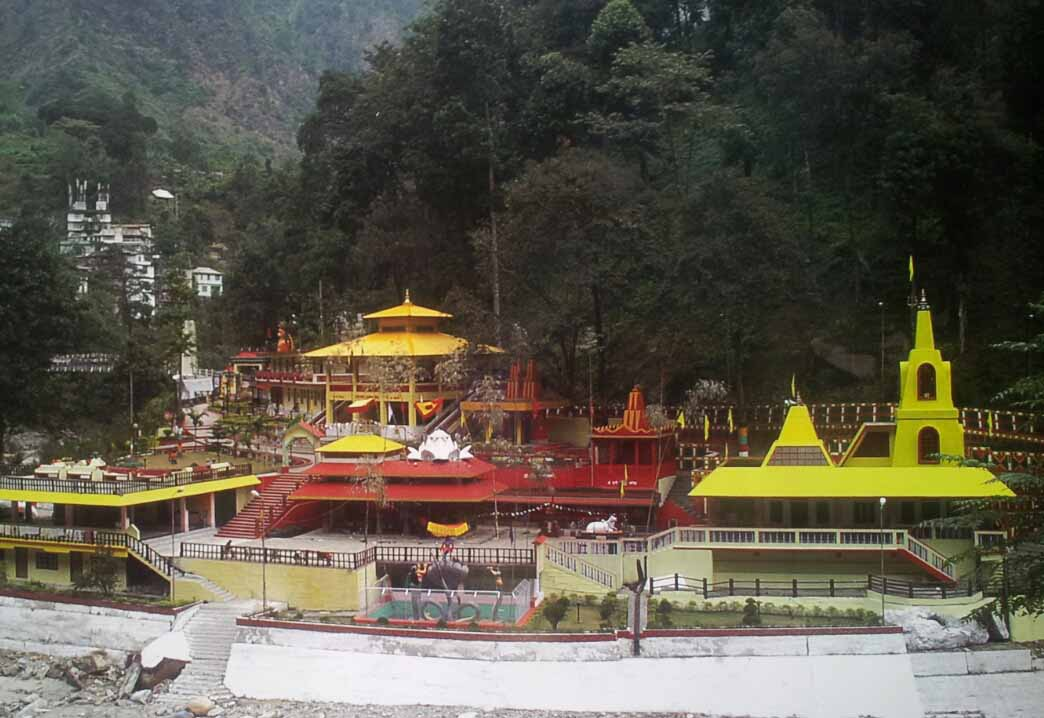
Kirateshwar Mahadev Temple in Legship is a major Hindu temple in Sikkim

== History ==
The Magars of Nepal were converted to Hinduism by Indian immigrants who migrated due to the rise of Muslim leaders. From there, Hinduism spread to the Sunuwar people by the 1760s. Nepalese Hindus migrated to Sikkim in the 18th and 19th-centuries, and became the majority. This migration was organised by the British Raj in order to increase the Nepalese population of Sikkim and create unrest between the Buddhists and the Hindus, thus giving the British Raj power over the region. Colonial officials frequently portrayed Sikkim's social divisions in terms of a Buddhist Bhutia-Lepcha population and a growing Hindu Nepali population. In the early 20th-century, the British decided to stop the migration from Nepal.

The Hindu Khasas heavily influenced the people of Sikkim, especially migrants to Sikkim after 1774. Within the state, Buddhists are perceived as indigenous, while Hindus are considered migrants from Nepal.

Sikkim Hindus are noted to practice a more liberal version of Hinduism, folk Hinduism. Hindus in Sikkim tend to reside in higher altitudes than their Buddhist counterparts.

Sikkim is a popular destination for Hindu pilgrims and tourists wishing to see Hindu architecture, and temples have been built to further tourism to the state. Samdruptse and Solophok are important Hindu sites in Sikkim. The state is also a stopover for Hindu pilgrims on the Kailash Mansarovar Yatra. There is generally little religious tension between Hindus and Buddhists in Sikkim as of 2021.

== Culture ==
Sikkimese Hindus do not marry between May and September (the Panchangam months of Jyestha, Asad, Sawan and Bhadau), as they coincide with months of heavy rainfall and agricultural harvest. Sikkimese Hindus visit mountain peaks during the Chaite Dashain festival.

== Demographics ==
Of the ethnic groups in Sikkim, the Gurungs, Rai, Limbus, Newars, Magars, Brahmins, Chhetris, Damais, Kamis, Lohars, Majis, and Sarkis are predominantly Hindu. In 1986, the three biggest groups were the Rai (14.6%), Chhetris (11.5%), and Limbus (9.4%).

Religious group	Population % 1991	Population % 2001	Population % 2011
Hinduism	68.36%	60.93%	57.76%
Buddhism	27.15%	28.11%	27.39%
Christianity	3.29%	6.67%	9.91%
Islam	0.94%	1.42%	1.62%
Sikhism	0.09%	0.21%	0.31%
Jainism	0.001%	0.03%	0.05%
Other religions	0.04%	2.38%	2.67%
No religion	–	–	0.3%

=== Hindu population by district (Note: The two subdivisions of the West Sikkim district- Gyalshing and Soreng were upgraded to districts in 2021) ===
District	Percent
East Sikkim	62.74%
South Sikkim	57.6%
Gyalshing district	60.07%
Soreng district	49.77%
North Sikkim	34.05%

== See also ==
- Hinduism in Arunachal Pradesh
