= Ram Bahadur Limboo =

Indian politician

Member of Sikkim Legislative Assembly
- In office 2014–2019
- Succeeded by: Aditya Tamang
- Constituency: Soreng-Chakung

Personal details
- Born: Ram Bahadur Limboo; 1953 or 1954 (age 72–73)
- Party: Sikkim Democratic Front
- Education: North Bengal University (BA, LLB)

Ram Bahadur Limboo is an Indian politician. He was elected to the Sikkim Legislative Assembly from Soreng-Chakung in the 2014 Sikkim Legislative Assembly election as a member of the Sikkim Democratic Front.

== Personal life ==
Limboo was born to Hema Karna Limboo and hails from Soreng in West Sikkim district of Sikkim. He obtained his Bachelor of Arts and LLB degrees from North Bengal University in 1983.

== Political career ==
Limbo won the 2014 Sikkim Legislative Assembly election from the Soreng-Chakung constituency as a member of the Sikkim Democratic Front with 6,596 votes, constituting 56.5% of the total vote share. He defeated Bharati Sharma of Sikkim Krantikari Morcha by a margin of 1,929 votes.
