= Rinchenpong Monastery =

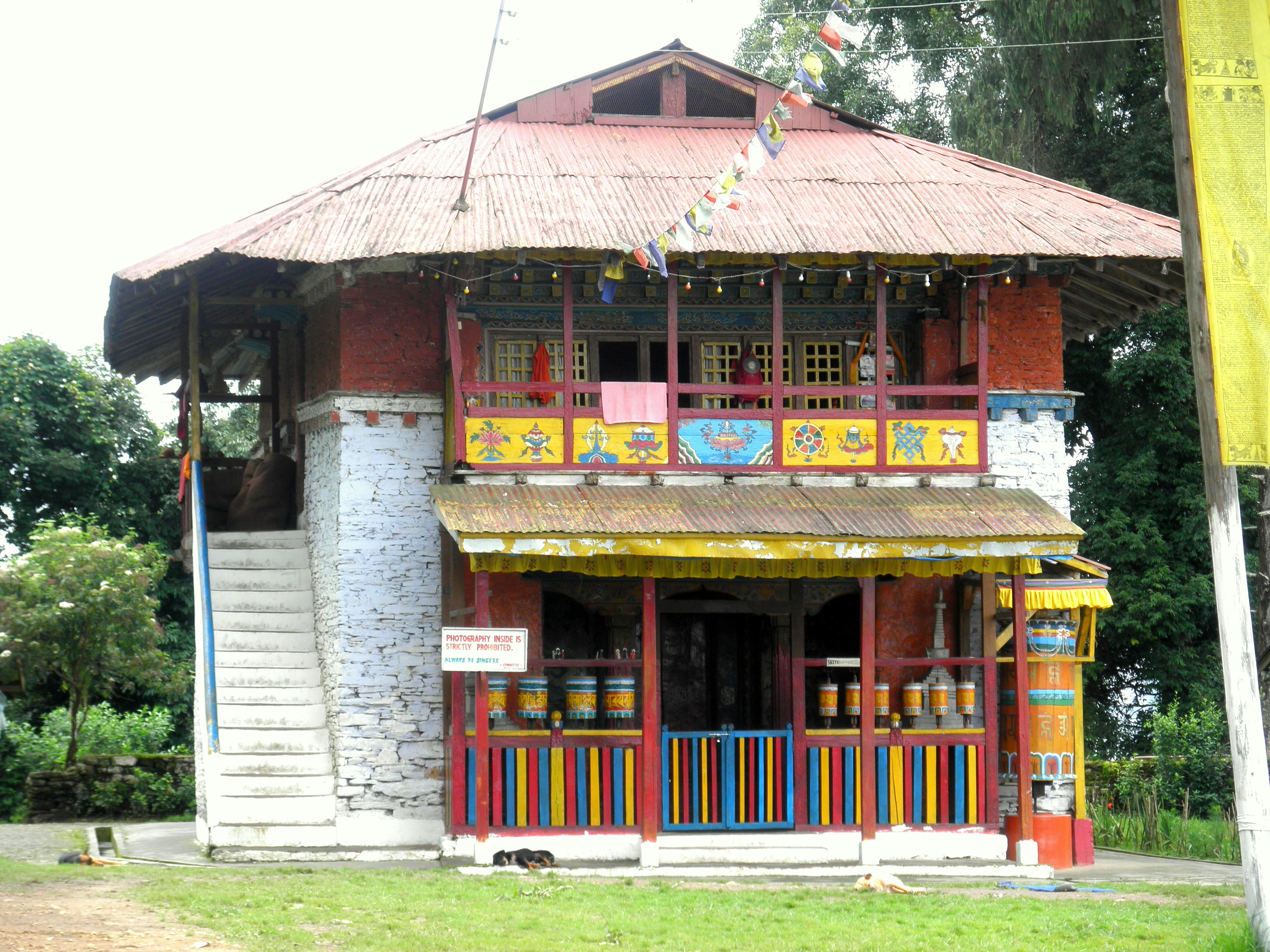
- Front of Rinchenpong Monastery
- Interactive map of Rinchenpong Monastery

Monastery information
- Order: Buddhist
- Established: 1730

People
- Founder: Ngadakpa Lama

Site
- Location: Near Richenpong, Sikkim, India
- Coordinates: 27.2353°N 88.2685°E
- Public access: Trail and stone steps from Richenpong

Rinchenpong Monastery is situated above the twin villages of Rinchenpong (Richenpong) and Kaluk in West Sikkim, at a height of over 1,700 metres (5,500 ft) in the northeastern state of Sikkim, India. This 18th century monastery is a popular tourist attraction in West Sikkim.

== History ==
Rinchenpong Monastery was established in 1730 by the Ngadakpa Lama in the village of Rinchenpong. It is the 3rd oldest monastery in Sikkim, starting with around 98 lamas. The monastery houses a rare Ati Buddha (Adi-Buddha) statue in the Yab-Yum position. Ati Buddha, also termed as The Primordial Buddha is said to be the true Buddha, symbolically represented as a naked Buddha in blue. In the Yab-Yum position, the Buddha is shown meditating while embracing a woman. In Buddhism it signifies the power of union of the male and female.

== Tourism ==
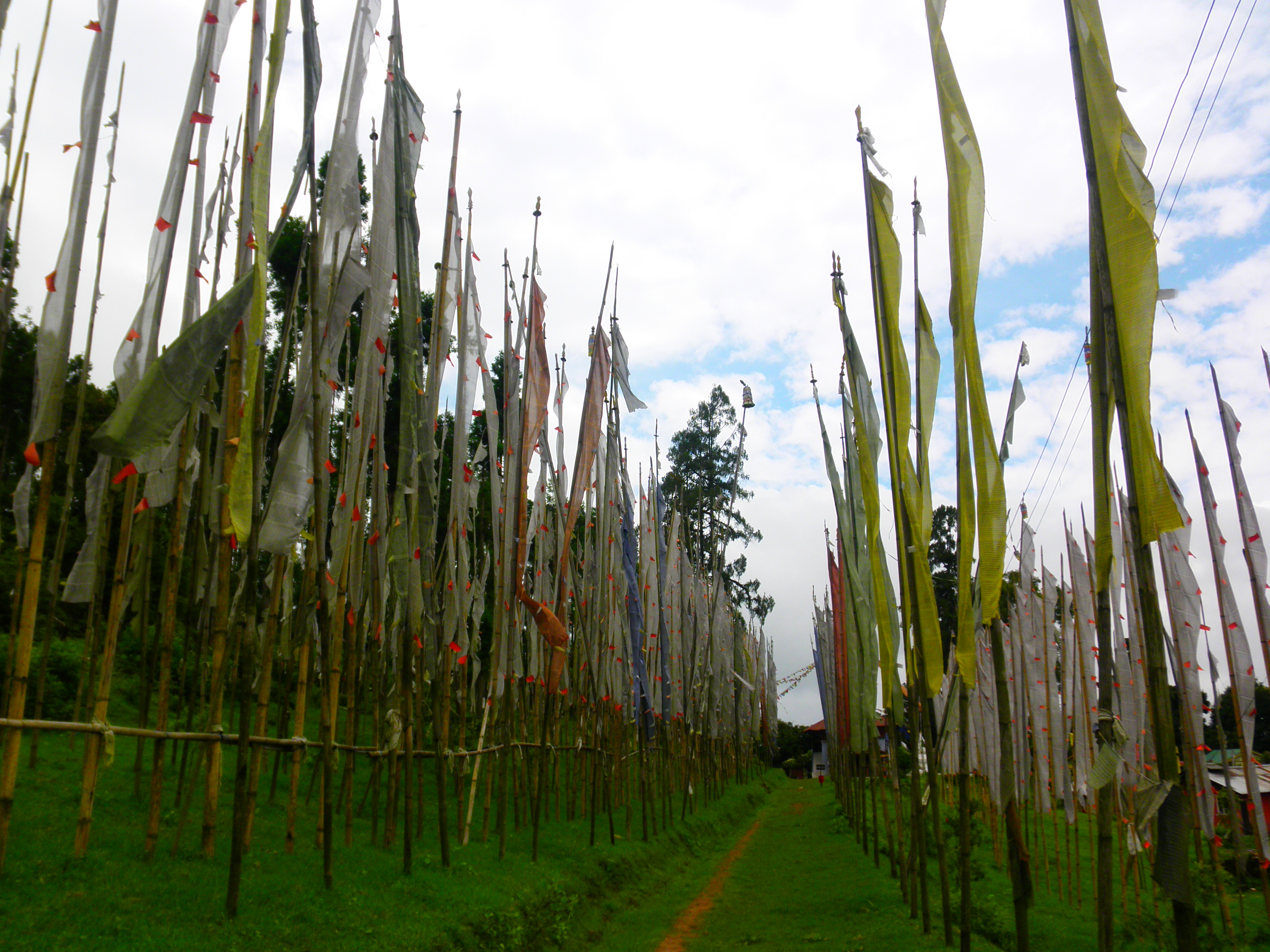
The mountainous path lined with traditional prayer flags at the entry to the Rinchenpong monastery

Rinchenpong Monastery is popular with tourists visiting West Sikkim for its scenery and Buddha statue. It is situated on a mountain trail above the village of Rinchenpong. The villages of Kaluk and Rinchenpong are at an altitude of 1,700 metres (5,500 ft) and about 5 hours by road from Siliguri. From the main Rinchenpong bazaar, a mountainous trail originates which leads to a bifurcated junction. Towards the left of this junction lies the Poison Pokhri, the poisoned lake, a symbol of resistance against foreign invasion. Further up from the Poison Pokhri, the trail continues amidst maize fields to a series of stony steps. The final climb of the stone staircase brings one to the Rinchenpong Monastery, situated amidst lush green mountains and floating clouds. A panoramic view is one of the attractions of the place.

The entrance to the monastery is lined with colorful prayer flags. Housed in a traditional hut, the outer periphery is decorated with prayer wheels. Child lamas can be seen in and around the monastery as the place also serves as a training center for lamas. The main door and windows have intricate detailing in a myriad of colors. Inside, the Buddha statue is placed on a platform. Visitor entry is allowed in the sanctum but photography has recently been prohibited.
