= Singling, Sikkim =

Community in Sikkim, India

Singling
- Community
- Location within Sikkim Location within India
- Coordinates: 27°10′56″N 88°11′58″E
- Country: India
- State: Sikkim
- District: Soreng
- Elevation: 2,088 m (6,850 ft)

Population (2011)
  - Total: 2,376
- Telephone code: 03592
- Assembly constituency: Soreong-Chakung
- Assembly MLA: Ram Bahadur Limboo (Subba)
- Lok Sabha constituency: Sikkim
- Member of Parliament: Indra Hang Subba

Singling (height: 6850 ft.) is a community in Sikkim, India. It has been on the trade routes between India and Bhutan since ancient times. A popular tourist activity is to trek between Barsey Rhododendron Sanctuary and Singling. There is an ancient monastery, a lake and amazing mountains. It is known for birding.

== Location ==
It is located 63 km to the south of the district headquarters in Geyzing and 3 km from Soreng.

== Demographics ==
According to the 2011 census: there are 518 houses, a population of 2,376 (male: 1,200, female: 1,176), children (0–6) 340 (male: 118, female: 122), there are 94 people who are members of Schedule Castes (male: 49, female: 45), 1,557 people who are members of Schedule Tribes (male: 787, female: 770), and the total literacy rate is 77.3% (male: 80.9%, female: 73.6%).

The languages spoken are Nepali, Rai, Tamang and Newari.

== Economy ==
The main sources of livelihood of the locals are cultivation of organic foods and vegetables. Almost every family is independent. In the step cultivation fields on hilly terrain, peas, cabbages, broccoli, onions, squash, mustard leaf (Brassica juncea) and lemons are cultivated. In this village the locals do not use any type of pesticides or artificial chemicals. There are piggeries and poultry farms in almost every house. Almost every house is decorated with orchids, primulas, geranium, along with white and red rhododendrons, locally known as guraus. Homestay is another source of their earnings.

== Transportation ==
The nearest railway station is New Jalpaiguri Junction railway station. From Siliguri S.N.T. bus stand, share cars and buses are available to Soreng. From Jorethang, cars are available to Soreng. From Soreng; Singling is about 3 km away. For this last 3 km road, the only option is to reserve a car to reach Singling.

== Avi fauna ==
Singling is a bird watcher's paradise. Numerous varieties of birds can be seen including: grey treepie, green-tailed sunbird, white-browed fulvetta, fire-breasted flowerpecker, Himalayan bulbul, red-billed leiothrix, great barbet, greater flameback and many species of sunbird. There is a short trekking route through the jungle trail within the forest, which leads to an open space; there one can see birds like the rufous sibia, grey bush chat, a few species of warbler, nuthatch, white-capped water redstart, scarlet minivet and crested serpent eagle.

== Flora ==
There are flowers of magnolias, blue poppies, primulas, geraniums, gladioli, azaleas, camellias, gentians, orchids and rhododendrons. Among trees, there are figs, shrubs, sal, ferns, a variety of bamboo, oak, juniper, cypresses, birch and silver fir.

== Tourism ==
Singling is situated in a vital spot to do number of treks in Sikkim, as Hiley-Barsey trek, Dzongri-Goecha La trek and so on. Likewise nearby there are a monastery, lake and a Sherpa town. Peling, Ringchenpong and Kaluk are nearby. Jorethang is the closest town, about 24 km away. At Singling numerous adventurous sports are organised like river rafting, hiking and paragliding.
