= Jorethang Loop Hydroelectric project =

Power project in Sikkim

- Location in Sikkim Jorethang Loop HEP
- Interactive map of Jorethang Loop Hydroelectric project
- Official name: Jorethang Loop Hydroelectric project
- Location: Sikkim, India
- Coordinates: 27°9′36″N 88°17′31″E
- Opening date: 26 September 2015
- Construction cost: Rs. 1,182 crore
- Owner: Government of India
- Operator: Sikkim Renewable Energy Development Agency

Dam and spillways
- Type of dam: Concrete Gravity
- Impounds: Rangit River
- Height: 17 metres (56 ft)
- Length: 108 metres (354 ft)
- Spillway capacity: m³/s

Reservoir
- Surface area: 14.489 hectares (35.80 acres)

Power Station
- Commission date: 29 October 2015
- Type: Run-of-the-river
- Turbines: 2×48 MW
- Installed capacity: 96 MW
- Annual generation: 444.03 GWh

Jorethang Loop Hydroelectric project is a 96 megawatts (129,000 hp), run-of-the-river hydroelectric power station on the Rangit river in South Sikkim district of Sikkim state in India. The dam is located near village Piple and the power station is located about 13 km downstream near village Majhitar. Dans Energy Private Limited was awarded contract for construction of the project. The project was officially inaugurated on 29 October 2015. The project was built at a cost of Rs 1,182 crores.

== Powerhouse ==
The dam is located about 5 km upstream from Jorethang and the powerhouse is located about 13 km downstream from dam site at 27°06′29″N 88°19′27″E. Water is diverted from the barrage through a 6.8 km−long head race tunnel, through a surge shaft of 25 m diameter and pressure shaft to the power house near the village of Majitar. The powerhouse has 2 x 48.75 MW vertical shaft type Francis turbines that generate 2x48 MW power. The water flow is discharged back into Rangit river through a 40m tall race channel. With installed capacity of 96 MW, the project is expected to generate approximately 444.03 GWh per annum.

== Power transmission ==
The electricity generated is connected to switchyard near the powerhouse and evacuated through double circuit 220 kV transmission line to the New Melli 220KV switching substation. New Melli sub station is located about 10 km away from the powerhouse and connected to Eastern Regional Grid.

== See also ==
- Rangit Hydroelectric Power Project Stage III – situated upstream
