= Prem Singh Tamang =

6th Chief Minister of Sikkim since 2019

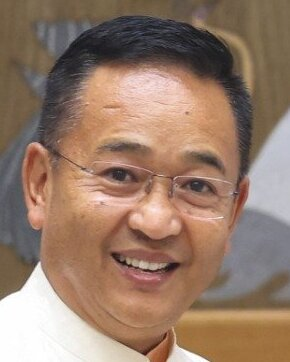
- Tamang, c. 2025

6th Chief Minister of Sikkim
- Incumbent
- Assumed office 27 May 2019
- Governor: Ganga Prasad; Lakshman Acharya; Om Prakash Mathur
- Preceded by: Pawan Kumar Chamling
Parliamentary offices
Member of Sikkim Legislative Assembly
Incumbent
Assumed office 1 June 2024
Preceded by	Bishnu Kumar Sharma
Constituency	Rhenock
In office 1 June 2024 – 14 June 2024
Preceded by	Aditya Tamang
Constituency	Soreng–Chakung
In office 21 October 2019 – 2 June 2024
Preceded by	Pawan Kumar Chamling
Succeeded by	Bhoj Raj Rai
Constituency	Poklok-Kamrang
In office 30 April 2009 – 11 April 2019
Preceded by	Constituency established
Succeeded by	Dilli Ram Thapa
Constituency	Upper Burtuk
In office 16 November 1994 – 2 March 2009
Preceded by	Tara Man Rai
Succeeded by	Constituency abolished
Constituency	Chakung

Chairperson of Sikkim Krantikari Morcha
- Incumbent
- Assumed office 4 February 2013

Personal details
- Born: 5 February 1968 (age 58) Soreng, Kingdom of Sikkim
- Party: Sikkim Krantikari Morcha (from 2013)
- Other political affiliations: Sikkim Democratic Front (till 2013)
- Spouse: Krishna Kumari Rai
- Children: 2 (including Aditya Tamang)
- Education: Darjeeling Government College (B.A, 1988)
- Occupation: Politician; teacher
- Nickname: P. S. Golay

Prem Singh Tamang (born 5 February 1968), better known as P. S. Golay, is an Indian politician and former teacher who is serving as the Chief Minister of Sikkim from 27 May 2019 and also as leader of the house in state assembly. He is also the founding leader of the Sikkim Krantikari Morcha since 2019. He represents the Poklok-Kamrang in the Sikkim Legislative Assembly since 2019, Upper Burtuk from 2009 to 2019 and Chakung from 1994 to 2009. Before forming the SKM party, he was a key member of the Sikkim Democratic Front (SDF) Party.

== Personal life ==
Tamang was born on 5 February 1968 to the Nepali-speaking Kalu Singh Tamang and Dhan Maya Tamang. He hails from Singling Busty, West Sikkim. He graduated with a degree in Bachelors of Arts from Darjeeling Government College in 1988. After graduation, he worked as a teacher in a state-run school. He is married to Krishna Rai. His son is politician Aditya Tamang, who is also a member of Sikkim Legislative Assembly from Soreng-Chakung.

In 2024, Tamang was conferred with the Gorkha Gaurav Samman 2024 award by the Nepali language daily Himalaya Darpan.

== Political career ==
In 1990, he was appointed a graduate teacher under the HRD Department in the Government of Sikkim and served until 1993.

Due to his active interest in social work and politics, he resigned from government service and started participating in the political activities of SDF. As the SDF candidate in the Soreng-Chakung constituency, West Sikkim, he was elected to the Sikkim Legislative Assembly in 1994. During his affiliations with the SDF party, he served as State Youth Convenor and Vice-President.

=== Sikkim government career ===
He served in ministerial roles in the Sikkim government for three consecutive terms. From 1994 to 1999 as the Minister for Animal Husbandry, Ecclesiastical and Industry Department. From 1999 to 2004 as the Minister for Industries and Animal Husbandry. From 2004 to 2009 as the Minister for Building and Housing Department.

In 2009, after winning an election in the Burtuk Constituency, he was nominated as the Chairperson of Industries Department. However, he did not serve as chairperson. After establishment of his party Sikkim Krantikari Morcha, during 2014 he was elected as MLA from Burtuk Constituency.

=== Sikkim Krantikari Morcha party ===
Golay became a dissident MLA of the SDF party after the Rolu Picnic event that was conducted by employees of Sikkim on 21 December 2009. The ruling party called a show-cause notice to the government workers who attended the Rolu Picnic.

Following this incident, Golay decided to found the Sikkim Krantikari Morcha, which opposed the SDF, on 4 February 2013 in Soreng, West Sikkim. On 6 September 2013 he officially resigned from all SDF party duties and became the president of the SKM party. During the election of 2014, the party gained ten of thirty-two seats in the Sikkim State Legislative Assembly under the leadership of Golay. Overall, in the 2014 election, Golay's party shared 42% of total votes in Sikkim.

On 13 January 2017, he was disqualified from the Sikkim Legislative Assembly after being convicted on 28 December 2016 for misappropriating government funds while with the SDF between 1994 and 1999. In 2017, he became the main opposition leader of Sikkim, serving as a president of Sikkim Krantikari Morcha. His release after conviction on 10 August 2018 witnessed massive gathering.

=== Chief Minister of Sikkim ===
Golay led the Sikkim Krantikari Morcha to victory in 2019 assembly elections winning 17 out of 32 seats in the legislative assembly which eventually ended the 24-year rule of the Pawan Kumar Chamling led Sikkim Democratic Front. On 24 May 2019, SKM spokesperson Jacob Khaling said Golay will head the government in the state however, according to constitutional experts, his conviction under the Prevention of Corruption Act might be a hindrance for him becoming the Chief Minister of Sikkim.

On 27 May 2019, Golay, who did not contest the legislative assembly polls, was sworn in the 6th Chief Minister of the state of Sikkim. Golay won from Poklok-Kamrang in the by-election with 10,811 votes, securing 84% of the total vote share. In August 2022, Tamang officially released Know Your India, a book on Indian wisdom authored by Shillong-based researcher Salil Gewali.

Golay led the Sikkim Krantikari Morcha to victory in 2024 Sikkim Legislative Assembly election winning 31 out of 32 seats with a vote percentage of 58.38%.

=== Electoral records ===
Sikkim Legislative Assembly election

Year	Constituency	Political Party	Result	Position	Votes	% Votes	% Margin	Deposit	Source
1994	Chakung	Sikkim Democratic Front	Won	1st/4	3,372	59.48	+28.33	refunded	
1999	Chakung	Sikkim Democratic Front	Won	1st/3	3,572	57.94	+18.69	refunded	
2004	Chakung	Sikkim Democratic Front	Won	1st/4	6,644	94.42	+91.59	refunded	
2009	Upper Burtuk	Sikkim Democratic Front	Won	1st/6	5,908	78.63	+60.73	refunded	
2014	Namthang-Rateypani	Sikkim Krantikari Morcha	Lost	2nd/4	4,643	43.38	-10.56	refunded	
2014	Upper Burtuk	Sikkim Krantikari Morcha	Won	1st/4	5,272	50.73	+5.59	refunded	
2019 (by-election)	Poklok-Kamrang	Sikkim Krantikari Morcha	Won	1st/3	10,811	84.00	+69.56	refunded	
2024	Soreng–Chakung	Sikkim Krantikari Morcha	Won	1st/5	10,480	72.18	+50.94	refunded	
2024	Rhenock	Sikkim Krantikari Morcha	Won	1st/7	10,094	64.54	+45.04	refunded	

== See also ==
- Prem Singh Tamang ministry

State Legislative Assembly
Preceded by Pawan Kumar Chamling	Member of the Sikkim Legislative Assembly from Poklok-Kamrang Assembly constituency 2019–	Incumbent
Political offices
Preceded by Pawan Kumar Chamling	Chief Minister of Sikkim; 2019 - Present	Succeeded by Incumbent
