= Varsey Rhododendron Sanctuary =

Wildlife protection area in India

Barsey Rhododendron Sanctuary
- Barsey Rhododendron Sanctuary
- IUCN category IV (habitat/species management area)
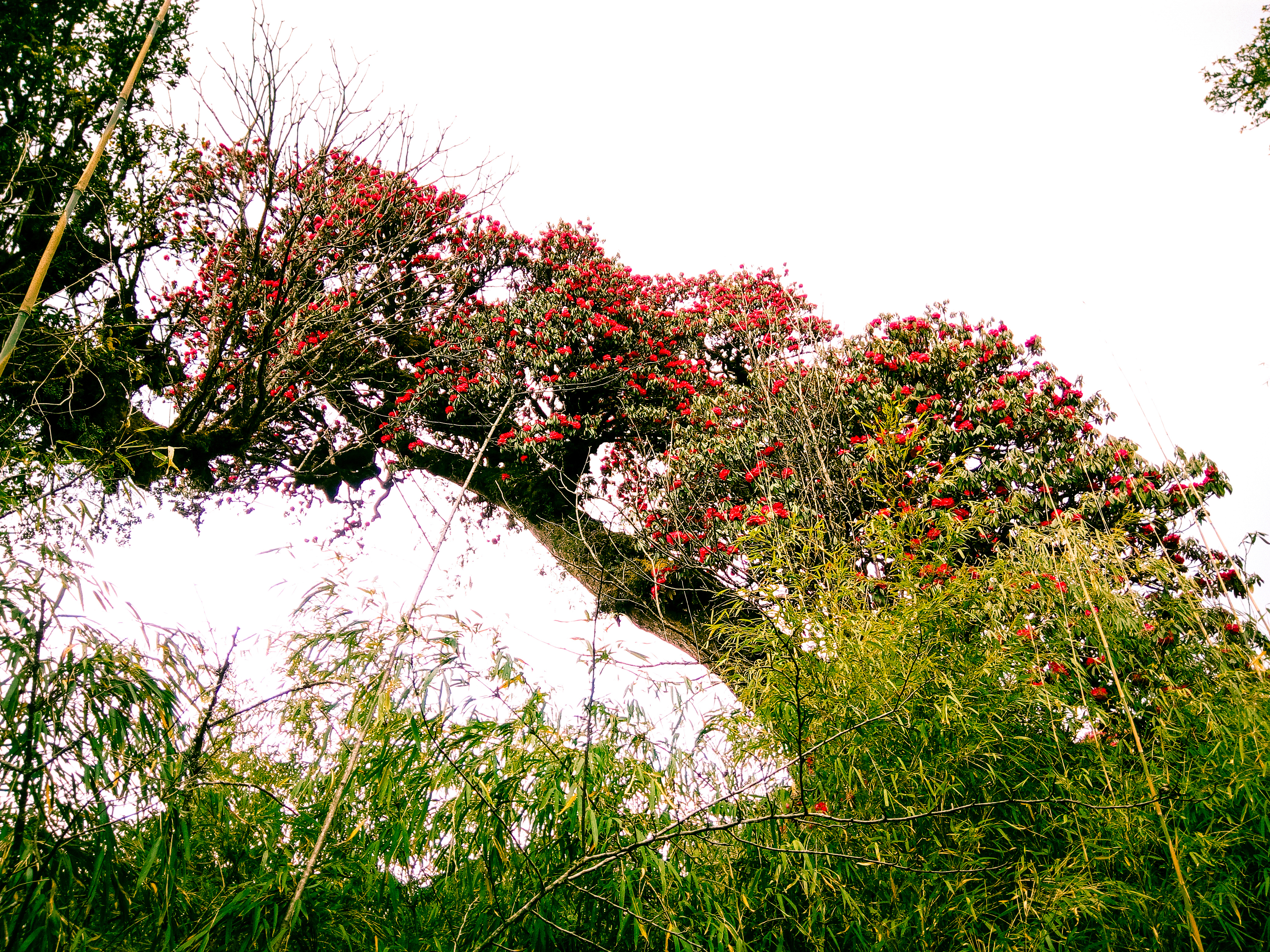
- Rhododendron at the sanctuary

- Location within Sikkim Location within India
- Interactive map of Barsey Rhododendron Sanctuary
- Location: West Sikkim District, Sikkim
- Nearest city: Soreng
- Coordinates: 27°11.65′N 88°7.10′E
- Area: 104 km^{2} (40 sq mi)
- Established: 2004
- Governing body: Government of India, Government of Sikkim

The Varsey Rhododendron Sanctuary or Barsey Rhododendron Sanctuary occupies 104 km^{2} in the Singalila Range in western Sikkim. It borders on Nepal to the west, and the state of West Bengal to the south across the Rambong Khola stream. The rhododendrons bloom from March till May.

== Fauna ==
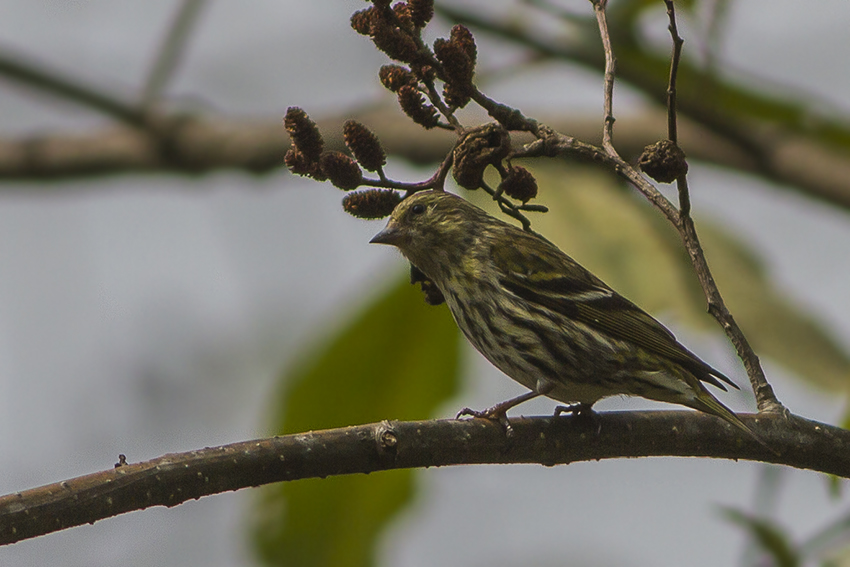
Tibetan serin

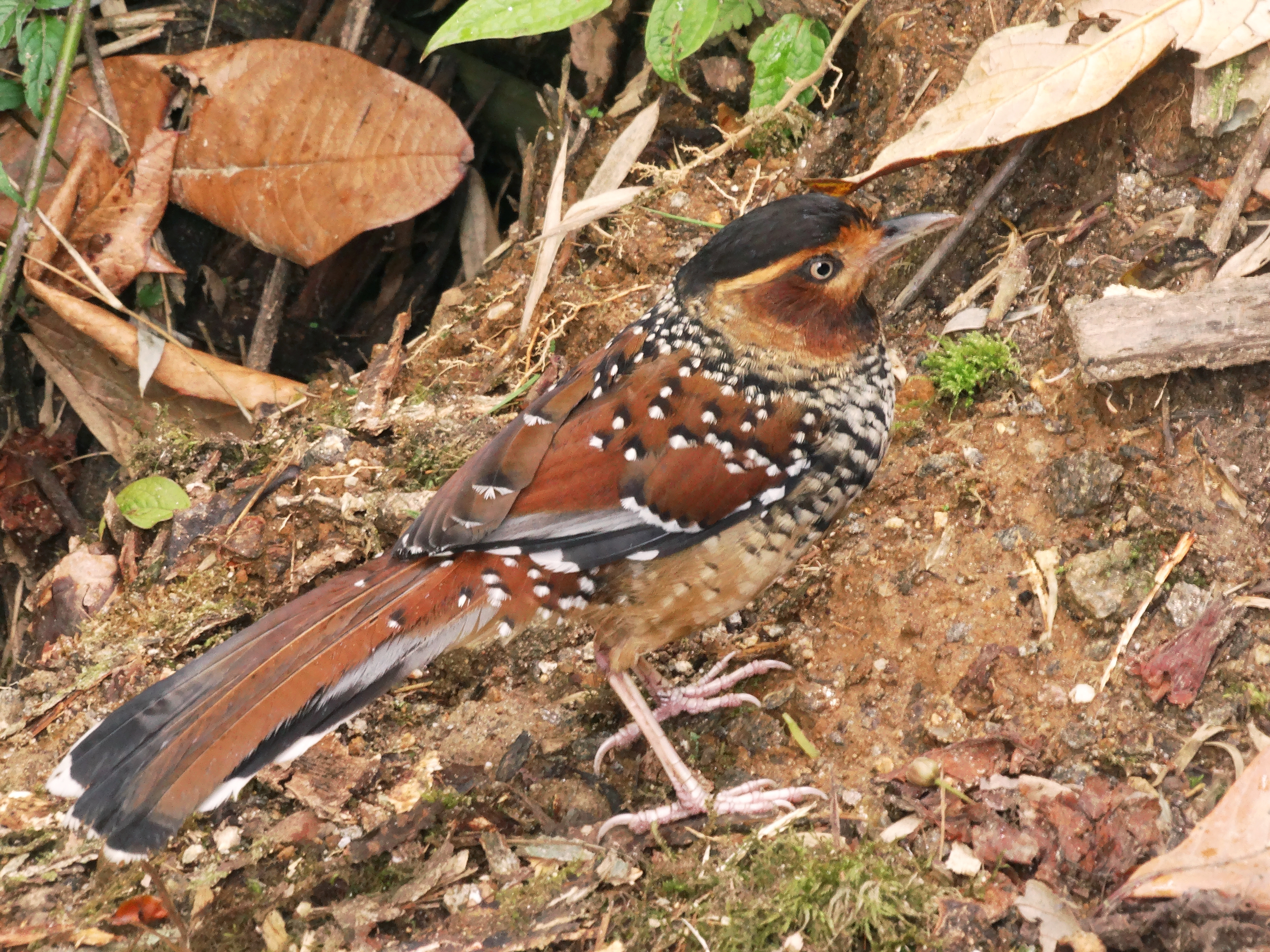
Spotted Laughingthrush

== Access ==
The Barsey Sanctuary can be reached from three points, Hilley, Dentam and Soreng. The most popular entry is Hilley since it is approachable by road and Varsey is only 4 km trek from this point along an undulating path shaded by different species of rhododendron.

== Tourism ==
Sikkim government has an arrangement for tourists to stay on top of the hill in a forest barrack. There are now several home-stays at the entrance of Versay Rhododendron Sanctuary as well as at Okhrey, which is a small village inhabited by mainly the Sherpa community.
