= Daramdin =

- Village
- Location in Sikkim, India Daramdin (India)
- Coordinates: 27.217°N 88.171°E
- Country: India
- State: Sikkim
- District: Soreng
- Elevation: 1,246 m (4,088 ft)

Languages
  - Official: Sikkimese, Nepali, Limboo, Bhutia, Lepcha, Limbu, Newari, Rai, Gurung, Mangar, Sherpa, Tamang and Sunwar
- Time zone: UTC+5:30 (IST)
- PIN: 737 121
- Vehicle registration: SK
- Nearest city: Soreng city
- Vidhan Sabha constituency: Daramdin
- Climate: sub tropical to alpine (Köppen)

Daramdin is a village located, near Soreng city in Soreng district, Sikkim, India. Daramdin is located, near Soreng, Dentam, Kaluk and Gyalshing. Daramdin was ruled by a feudal king Na Hang in the 1st century. This place mostly comprises Limbu and Lepchas. other communities like Pradhans, Chettris and Bhujels are also there in small numbers. The name Daramdin is derived from the local Lepcha language ‘Dalom’ meaning a place of rest or a flat land.

== Tourism ==
The main tourist attraction of Daramdin is Sri Sathya Sai Sarva Dharma Kendra Daramdin which is located in its centre. A foundation of a traditional spot, Swarga Janae Seeri (Stairway to heaven) was also laid in 1997. The construction was stopped but now it has been resumed and it is about to get completed.

== Education ==
Kripasalyan government secondary school is situated near Daramdin Bazar.

Mahatma Gandhi University, Daramdin, Sikkim established in September 2022.
