= Ambotey =

- Location within Sikkim
- Coordinates: 27.139°N 88.161°E
- Country: India
- State: Sikkim
- District: West Sikkim
- PIN: 737122

Ambotey is a village between Daramdin and Sombaria in Soreng district, Sikkim, India. Several schools are located in or near Ambotey.
