= Rangit Dam =

Dam in India

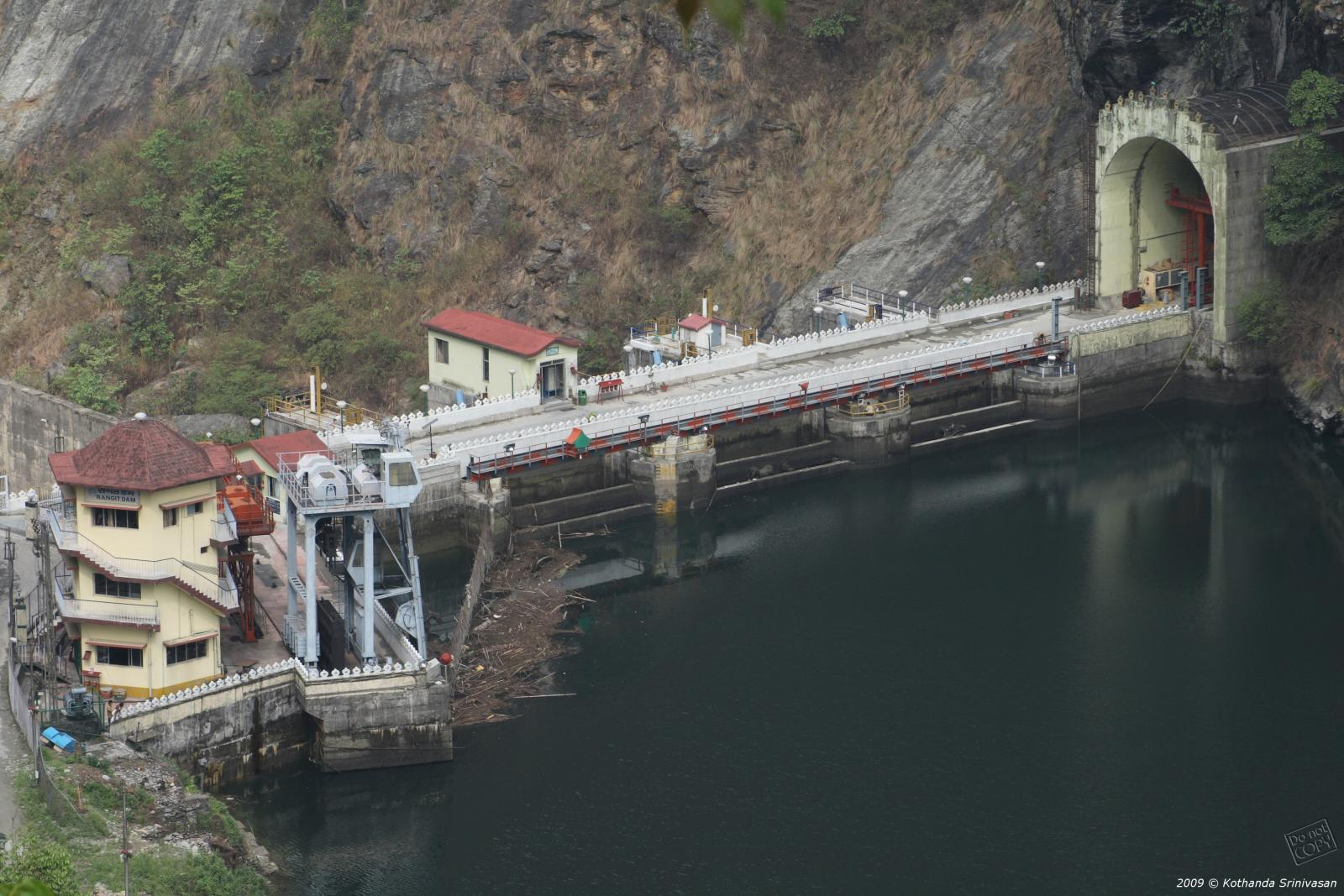
- Rangit Dam and Reservoir

- Location within Sikkim
- Official name: Rangit Hydropower Project, Stage III
- Coordinates: 27°17′41″N 88°17′32″E
- Opening date: January 2000
- Owner: NHPC
- Operator: National Hydroelectric Power Corporation

Dam and spillways
- Type of dam: Concrete Gravity
- Impounds: Ranjit River
- Height: 45 metres (148 ft)
- Length: 100 metres (330 ft)
- Spillway type: Gated Overflow
- Spillway capacity: 2725 m³/s

Reservoir
- Creates: Rangit Reservoir
- Total capacity: 1.175 million cubic metres
- Catchment area: 979 square kilometres (378 mi^{2})
- Surface area: 12.9 hectares (32 acres)

Power Station
- Operator: National Hydroelectric Power Corporation
- Commission date: January 2000
- Type: Run-of-the-river
- Turbines: 3×20 MW
- Installed capacity: 60 MW
- Annual generation: 340 GWh (Firm Power 39 MW)

Rangit Dam forms the headworks of the Rangit Hydroelectric Power Project Stage III, is a run-of-the-river hydroelectric power project on the Ranjit River, a major tributary of the Teesta River in the South Sikkim district of the Northeastern Indian state of Sikkim. The project's construction was completed in 1999. The project became functional in 2000. The project was built at a cost of Rs 4922.6 million (Rs 492.26 crores) (at US$1 = Rs 45, this is US$109.39 million). The average annual power generation from the 60 MW (3x20 MW) project is 340 GWh with firm power of 39 MW.

== Topography ==
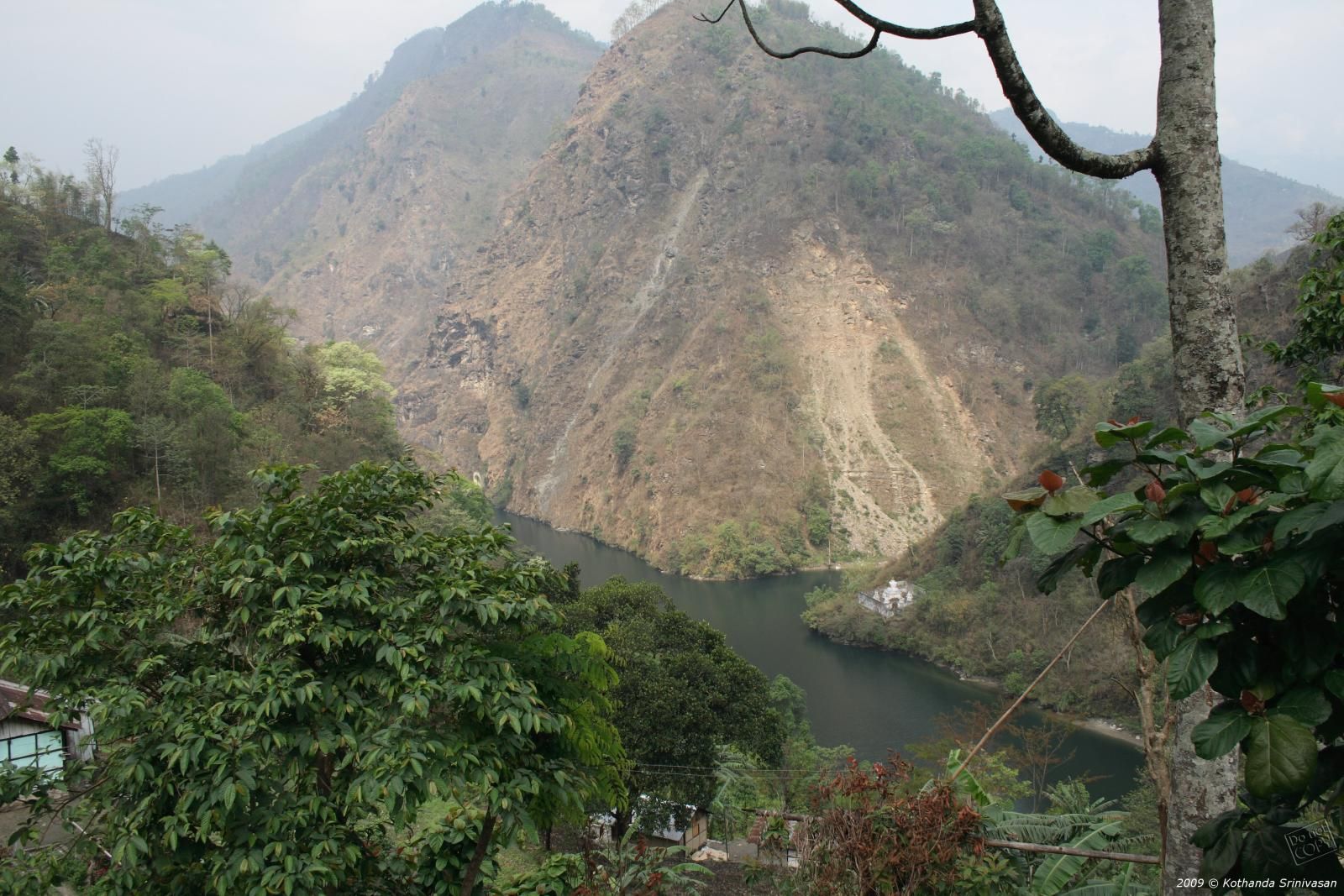
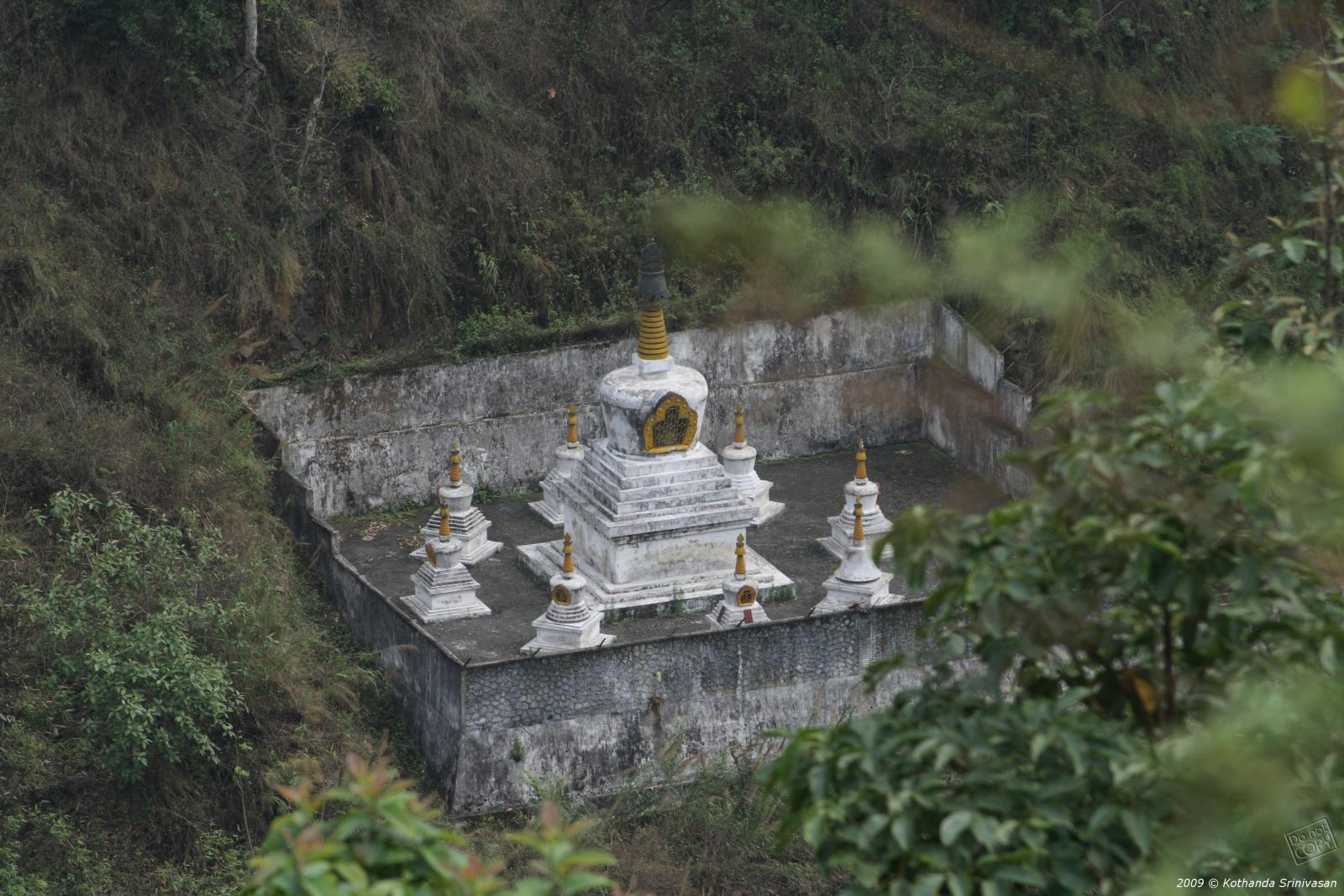
Left: Confluence of Rangeet River and Rathong chu rivers upstream of the Rangit Dam. Right: A chorten above the confluence of the two rivers

The Ranjit River, on which the Rangit Dam is located, is a major right-bank tributary of the Teesta River in Sikkim. The river arises from the Talung glacier, and it meets the Teesta river at Melli after a travel of 61 kilometres (38 mi) from its source. At the dam site, the catchment area drained is 979.02 square kilometres (378.00 mi^{2}) (rain-fed catchment is 712 square kilometres (275 mi^{2}) and the balance area is snow-fed, above 4,570 metres (14,990 ft)); the elevation of the catchment area varies from about 600 metres (2,000 ft) to about 7,338 metres (24,075 ft) at North Kabru Peak and is delimited between 27.275°N 88.0141°E and 27.6195°N 88.42°E. A number of perennial streams originate in glacial fields of the river basin; important snow-fed rivers which constitute the Rangit basin above the dam site are the Rathong Chu, Rimbi Chu, Prek Chu, Ralli Chu, Rongdon Chu, and Kayam Chu. The drainage pattern is sub-dendentric.

The dam is located at a distance of 130 kilometres (81 mi) from Siliguri and 70 kilometres (43 mi) from Gangtok. The dam is downstream of the confluence of Rathong Chu and Rangit Rivers near the Legship town, and the powerhouse of the project is near Sagbari village.

== Hydrology ==
The annual inflow in the river at the location of the dam has been estimated as 696000 m^{3}. The maximum flood discharge has been adopted as 3,395 m^{3}/s (119,900 cu ft/s), while the design flood discharge adopted for the spillway is 2,725 m^{3}/s (96,200 cu ft/s). The dependable discharge adopted for diversion from the reservoir for power generation is 1,717.8 m^{3}/s (60,660 cu ft/s) (without considering contribution from the upstream Stage II project, which is yet to be implemented).

== Climate ==
The climate of the Rangit River basin is cold and humid. The climatic seasons of the basin represented in the project area are: spring season–late February, summer season–March, premonsoon showers–April and May; monsoon season–May to September, sometimes extending to October. Snow, at higher elevations of the catchment, falls between December and February. Winters are very cold with mist and fog lasting from November to February.

== Geology ==
Precambrian formations of the Daling series of quartzites and phyllites dominate the area. This rock type is overlain by crystalline Darjeeling Gneiss comprising gneisses and granitoides. Recent alluvium of sandy loam, silty loam, and clayey material of varying thickness overlay the rock formations. The banks of the Rangit River have silty clay material with large rock blocks. Many landslides are observed in the catchment, which add to the siltation problems of the reservoir.

== Project features ==
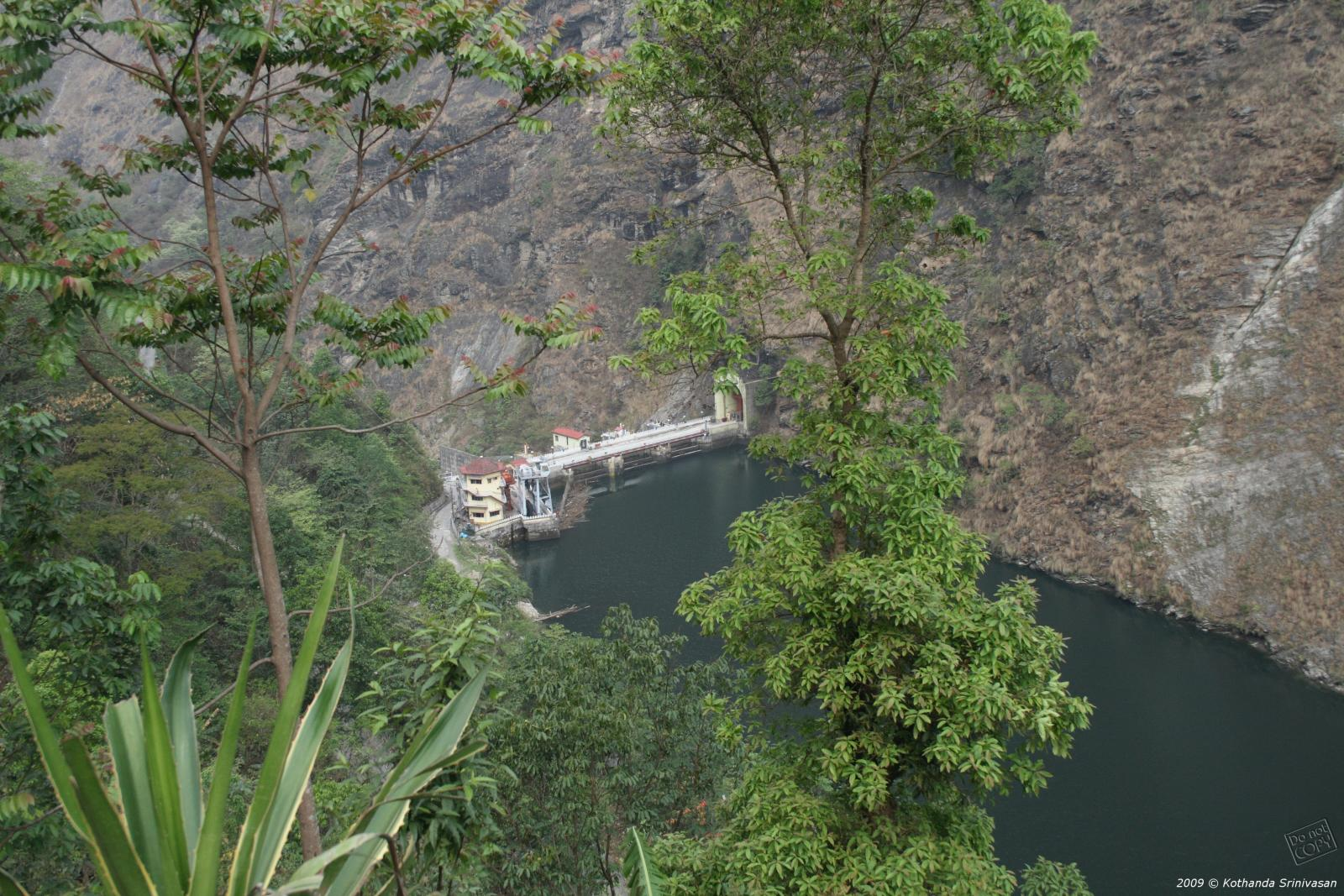
Aerial view of Ranjit Dam and related works

The Rangit Dam is a 45-metre-high (148 ft) concrete gravity structure, 100 metres (330 ft) long. The reservoir created behind the dam has a storage capacity of 1.175×10^{6} m^{3}. The storage created is used for hydropower generation at a surface powerhouse on the left bank of the Rangit River. The diversion of flow from the reservoir to the surface powerhouse is effected through an intake leading to a concrete-lined headrace tunnel (HRT) of 4.5 metres (15 ft) diameter (horseshoe-shaped and concrete-lined) of 3 kilometres (1.9 mi) length, a surge shaft (14 m × 60 m; 46 ft × 197 ft) at the end of the HRT with control arrangement followed by one main penstock pipe (3.5 m × 270 m; 11 ft × 886 ft) trifurcating into three lines of 2 metres (6.6 ft) diameter each to connect to the three Francis turbine generators of 20 MW capacity each, through the MIVs. The tailwaters from the turbines are fed back into the river through a combined short tailrace channel. The firm power generation is on the order of 39 MW, corresponding to annual energy generation of 340 GWh (in a 90% dependable year).

The ruling levels for power generation are:

- Full reservoir level (FRL): 639 metres (2,096 ft)
- Minimum draw-down level: 627 metres (2,057 ft)
- Normal tail-water level in the tailrace channel from the powerhouse: 512 metres (1,680 ft)
- Operating gross head: 127 metres (417 ft)

Since it is owned by Coastal Projects Ltd, the power generated is shared and Sikkim gets a share of 13.33%.

The project was funded by the Government of India and built by the National Hydroelectric Power Corporation (NHPC). The construction of the project was completed in December 1999, and operation started in January 2000. Operation and maintenance of the project is also with the NHPC.

This power project was the third stage of the five-stage cascade development conceived on the main stem of the Rangit River, and was the first to be built in the series of Rangit Stage I to IV initially conceived by the Central Water Commission. Three other projects on the Rangit River planned and under development are the Rangit Stage II (60 MW capacity), Rangit Stage IV (120 MW capacity), and Jorethong HEP (96 MW); the last two projects are now under construction.

== Environmental aspects ==
In river-valley reservoir projects, the gravity of the siltation problem induced by to catchment degradation is serious and needs to be suitably addressed. For this purpose, the Ministry of Environment and Forests of the Government of India have made it obligatory for the project authorities to implement physical engineering and biological measures in the catchment area of the project to be taken up concurrently with the implementation of the project. This activity involves several works defined under the Catchment Area Treatment (CAT) plan.

For evolving the CAT plan, the status of the reservoir catchment was analysed. The reservoir catchment consists of five types of forests namely, the East Himalayan Sub-Tropical wet hill forests (elevation range of 800–1,800 metres (2,600–5,900 ft)), East Himalayan wet temperate forests (elevation range of 1,800–2,700 metres (5,900–8,900 ft)), oak and rhododendron forests (elevated above 2,700 metres (8,900 ft)), mixed coniferous forests (in elevation range of 2,700–3,750 metres (8,860–12,300 ft)), and alpine scrubs/pastures (above 3,750 metres (12,300 ft)). There are 35 reserve forests in the catchment, out of which 29 are in West Sikkim district and six are in South Sikkim district. The entire catchment area was analysed in detail to assess the degraded areas to be treated under the CAT plan to reduce siltation problems. An area of 13,075 hectares (32,310 acres) was identified for implementing engineering and biological treatment measures. These measures were implemented, starting in 1995–96, by the Forest Department of the Government of Sikkim involving engineering treatment measures (included agricultural land, forest land and water land) and biological treatment measures. 15 nurseries were established covering an area of 18.5 hectares (46 acres) to provide saplings/seedlings for plantation in the sub-watersheds of the catchment identified for treatment.

== Recreation ==
The reservoir created by the Rangit Dam has been developed into a recreational water park named Rangit Water World. It is a popular venue for picnics, fishing, boating and rafting. The recreational centre was developed due to the initiative of the local people of Legship town.

== See also ==
- Jorethang Loop Hydroelectric project
