= Kirateshwar Mahadev Temple =

Hindu temple in Sikkim, India

- किराँतेश्वर महादेव मन्दिर
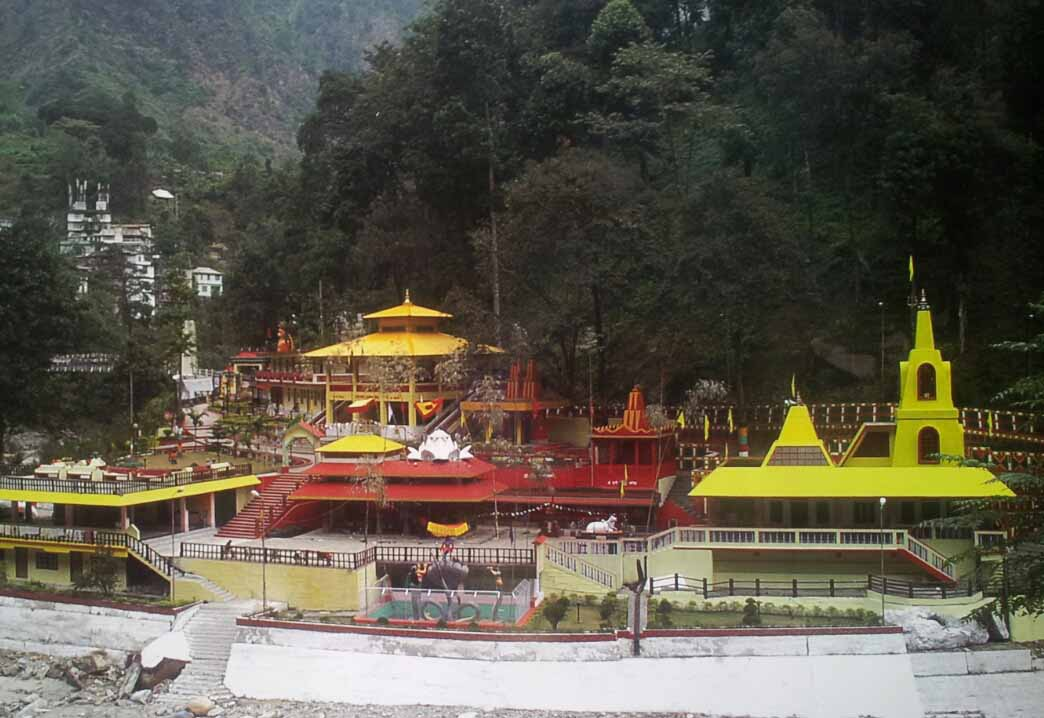
- Main Shrine of Kirateshwar Mahadev Temple

- Location in Sikkim Kirateshwar Mahadev Temple (India)

Religion
- Affiliation: Hinduism
- District: Gyalshing
- Deity: Shiva
- Festivals: Bala Chaturdasi and Maha Shivaratri

Location
- Location: Legship
- State: Sikkim
- Country: India
- Coordinates: 27°27′N 88°27′E

Kirateshwar Mahadev Temple (Nepali: किराँतेश्वर महादेव मन्दिर) is a Hindu temple, identified to be a Hindu pilgrimage site which is located at Legship, Gyalshing district, India along the banks of River Rangeet, which has many episodes of the Mahabharata attached to it. The temple is also known as Kirateshwar Mahadev Thaan by the Kirati people or simply known as Shiv Mandir.

== Main Attraction ==
The main attraction of the temple are the festival of the Bala Chaturdashi, which is observed in November–December every year and the Shiv Ratri also known as Maha Shivaratri which falls in the month of February or March every year. There are other temples dedicated to Lord Rama and Durga can be found here making it an important pilgrimage destination for Hindus.

== Historical background ==
According to Hindu beliefs, pleased with Arjuna's hard penance and devotion, Lord Shiva appeared before him in the very spot where the temple lies as hunter Kirateshwar or Lord of the Kiratas and blessed him with success in the Mahabharat War. Similarly, people found that a stone miraculously existed manifesting Shiva Ling. The said Shiv Ling is the main effigy of worship. It is believed by many that a mere visit with true devotion to this temple fulfills one's wishes, particularly a wish for son or daughter and also wishes for peace, harmony and good health.

== See also ==
- Kirata
- Kirata Kingdom
- Kirati people
- Kirat Mundhum
