= Rinchenpong =

Rinchenpong Rinchenpong
- Town
- Location in Sikkim, India Rinchenpong (India)
- Coordinates: 27.242192°N 88.270916°E
- Country: India
- State: Sikkim
- District: Gyalshing

Government
  - Type: Democratic
  - Body: SKM

Languages
  - Official: Nepali, Sikkimese, Lepcha, Limbu, Newari, Rai, Gurung, Mangar, Sherpa, Tamang and Sunwar
- Time zone: UTC+5:30 (IST)
- Postal code: 737111
- Vehicle registration: SK

Rinchenpong is a town in Soreng district, India. It is situated in West Sikkim, about 123 kilometres (76 mi) west of Gangtok and 47 kilometres (29 mi) south of Gyalshing, close to the village of Kaluk. It sits at an altitude of 5,576 feet (1,700 m). It is known for the Reesum Monastery and its trekking routes.

Near the town is the site of a historical battle between the forces of the then chogyal (king) of Sikkim and the invading British forces. The locals (Lepchas) and the rest of Gurkhas (especially the Gurungs) tribesmen used a concoction of unidentified herbs to poison the only water source, a lake (local term: pokhri). As a result, more than half of the British forces were killed, which stopped the British invasion and resulted in an accord. The lake remains poisoned even to this day and is known as bikh-pokhri locally (poisoned lake).

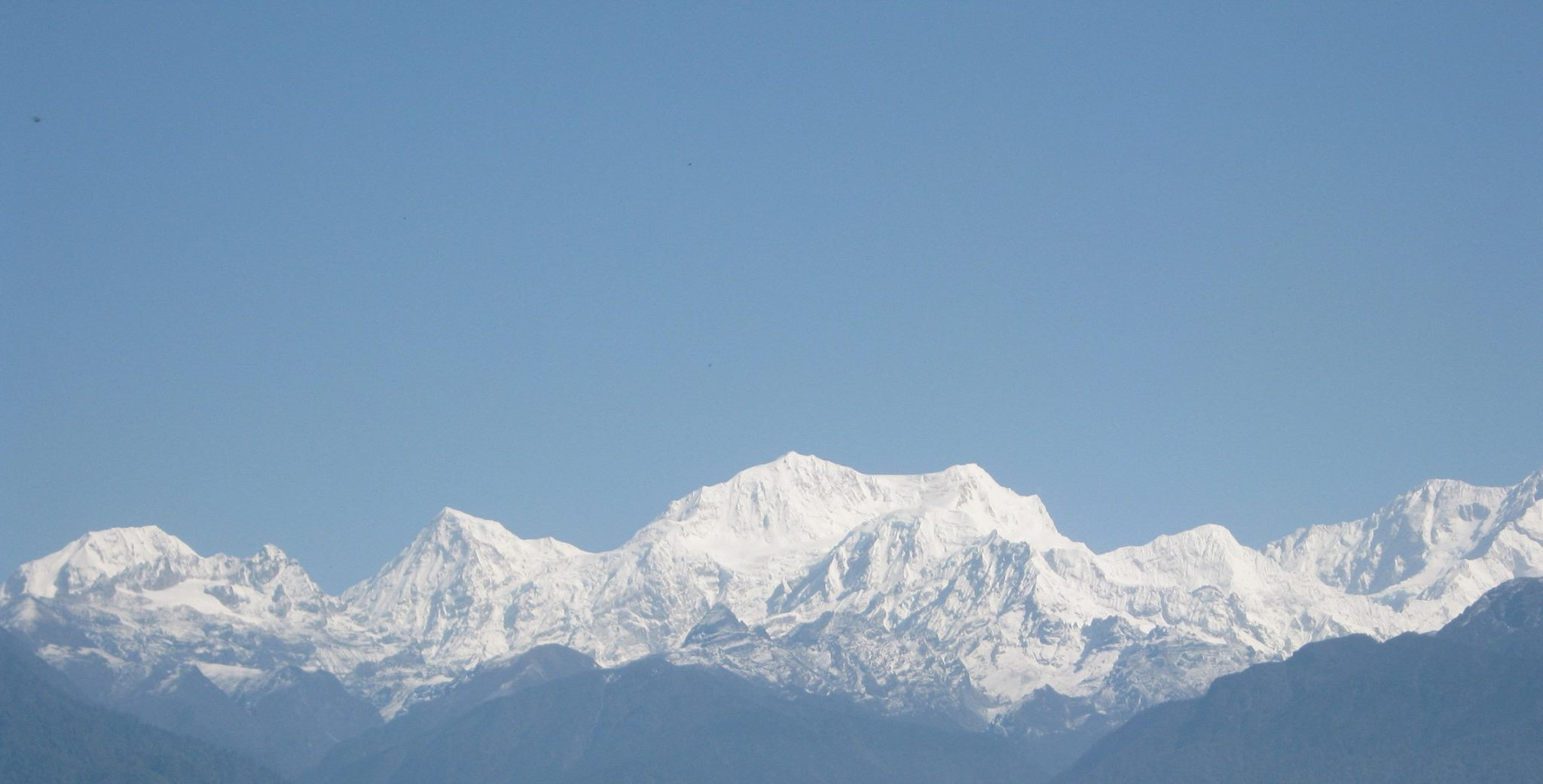
Mt. Kanchanjunga (Kangchendzonga), the third highest mountain peak of the world and the second highest mountain peak of India, as seen from Rinchenpong, Geyzing subdivision, West Sikkim district, Sikkim, East India on 7 May 2017.

The local languages of the region are Nepali, Lepcha, Bhutia, Hindi and English. The area has an average elevation of 5,576 feet (1,700 m).
