= Aditya Tamang =

Indian politician

Member of Sikkim Legislative Assembly
- Incumbent
- Assumed office 13 November 2024
- Preceded by: Prem Singh Tamang
- Constituency: Soreng-Chakung
- In office 23 May 2019 – 1 June 2024
- Preceded by: Ram Bahadur Limboo
- Succeeded by: Prem Singh Tamang
- Constituency: Soreng-Chakung

Personal details
- Born: Aditya Tamang; 15 August 1990 (age 36) Gangtok, Sikkim, India
- Party: Sikkim Krantikari Morcha
- Spouse: Namgyal Doma Bhutia
- Children: 1
- Parent: Prem Singh Tamang (father)
- Education: Hindu College (Bachelor of Arts)
- Profession: Social worker, politician

Aditya Tamang, also known as Aditya Golay, is an Indian politician. He was elected to the Sikkim Legislative Assembly from Soreng-Chakung in the 2019 Sikkim Legislative Assembly election as a member of the Sikkim Krantikari Morcha. He is the son of Prem Singh Tamang, the 6th Chief Minister of Sikkim.

== Personal life ==
Aditya was born to politician Prem Singh Tamang on 15 August 1990 in Gangtok, Sikkim. He is married to Namgyal Doma Bhutia, with whom he has a daughter.
