= Upper Burtuk Assembly constituency =

Constituency of the Sikkim legislative assembly in India

Coordinates: 27.350°N 88.619°E

Upper Burtuk
- Constituency No. 28 for the Sikkim Legislative Assembly

Constituency details
- Country: India
- Region: Northeast India
- State: Sikkim
- District: Gangtok
- Lok Sabha constituency: Sikkim
- Established: 2008
- Total electors: 15,231
- Reservation: None

Member of Legislative Assembly
- 11th Sikkim Legislative Assembly
- Incumbent Kala Rai
- Party: SKM
- Alliance: NDA
- Elected year: 2024

Upper Burtuk is one of the 32 Legislative Assembly constituencies of Sikkim state in India.

It is part of Gangtok district and consists of the following Revenue Blocks: Ranka, Sangtong, Upper Sicheygaon, Parbing, Sicheygaon, Gangtok Private Estate, Burtuk, Luing and Upper Burtuk, all of Gangtok Sub-Division.

== Members of the Legislative Assembly ==
Election	Member	Party
2009	Prem Singh Tamang	Sikkim Democratic Front
2014	Prem Singh Tamang	Sikkim Krantikari Morcha
2019	Dilli Ram Thapa	Sikkim Democratic Front
2024	Kala Rai	Sikkim Krantikari Morcha

== Election results ==
=== Assembly Election 2024 ===
2024 Sikkim Legislative Assembly election: Upper Burtuk
Party	Candidate	Votes	%	±%
SKM	Kala Rai	6,323	50.54%	▲5.18
BJP	Dilli Ram Thapa	3,755	30.01%	New
SDF	Dil Bahadur Thapa	1,623	12.97%	▼38.80
CAP–Sikkim	Bhim Kumar Tamang	581	4.64%	New
INC	Aita Tamang	123	0.98%	▼0.10
NOTA	None of the Above	107	0.86%	▲0.07
Margin of victory		2,568	20.52%	▲14.11
Turnout		12,512	77.06%	▼0.38
Registered electors		16,236		▲6.60
SKM gain from SDF		Swing	▼1.24	

=== Assembly election 2019 ===
2019 Sikkim Legislative Assembly election: Upper Burtuk
Party	Candidate	Votes	%	±%
SDF	Dilli Ram Thapa	6,107	51.77%	▲6.56
SKM	Nagendra Bikram Gurung	5,350	45.35%	▼5.37
INC	Aita Tamang	128	1.09%	▼0.11
NOTA	None of the Above	93	0.79%	▼0.55
SRP	Dal Bahadur Tamang	59	0.50%	New
HSP	Philip Lamichaney	59	0.50%	New
Margin of victory		757	6.42%	▲0.90
Turnout		11,796	77.45%	▼3.98
Registered electors		15,231		▲19.33
SDF gain from SKM		Swing	▲1.05	

=== Assembly election 2014 ===
2014 Sikkim Legislative Assembly election: Upper Burtuk
Party	Candidate	Votes	%	±%
SKM	Prem Singh Tamang	5,272	50.73%	New
SDF	D. R. Thapa	4,699	45.21%	▼33.41
BJP	Ugen Tamang	159	1.53%	▲0.53
NOTA	None of the Above	139	1.34%	New
INC	Santa Bir Gurung	124	1.19%	▼16.71
Margin of victory		573	5.51%	▼55.21
Turnout		10,393	81.42%	▼1.06
Registered electors		12,764		▲40.11
SKM gain from SDF		Swing	▼27.90	

=== Assembly election 2009 ===
2009 Sikkim Legislative Assembly election: Upper Burtuk
Party	Candidate	Votes	%	±%
SDF	Prem Singh Tamang	5,908	78.63%	New
INC	Arun Kumar Rai	1,345	17.90%	New
SHRP	Sumitra Rai	86	1.14%	New
BJP	Binod Kumar Adhikari	75	1.00%	New
Independent	Tikendra Sharma	74	0.98%	New
Margin of victory		4,563	60.73%	
Turnout		7,514	82.48%	
Registered electors		9,110		
SDF win (new seat)				

== See also ==
- List of constituencies of the Sikkim Legislative Assembly
- Gangtok district
