= Kala Rai =

Indian politician from Sikkim

Member of Sikkim Legislative Assembly
- Incumbent
- Assumed office 1 June 2024
- Preceded by: Dilli Ram Thapa
- Constituency: Upper Burtuk

Personal details
- Political party: Sikkim Krantikari Morcha

Kala Rai is an Indian politician from Sikkim belonging from the Sikkim Krantikari Morcha. She is a member of the Legislative Assembly in the 11th Sikkim Legislative Assembly. She won over BJP's candidate and state president Dilli Ram Thapa with a margin of 2968 votes.

== Education ==
She has a Diploma in Pharmacy from the Punjab State Board of Technical Education and Industrial Training in 1995.
