= Dilli Ram Thapa =

Indian politician

President of Bharatiya Janata Party, Sikkim
- Incumbent
- Assumed office 4 February 2023
- National President: JP Nadda; Nitin Nabin

Member of Sikkim Legislative Assembly
- In office 28 May 2019 – 1 June 2024
- Preceded by: Prem Singh Tamang
- Succeeded by: Kala Rai
- Constituency: Upper Burtuk

Personal details
- Party: Bharatiya Janata Party
- Other political affiliations: Sikkim Democratic Front

Dilli Ram Thapa is a Bharatiya Janata Party politician from Sikkim. He has been elected in Sikkim Legislative Assembly election in 2019 from Upper Burtuk constituency as candidate of Sikkim Democratic Front but later he joined Bharatiya Janata Party.
