= Sri Sathya Sai Sarva Dharma Kendra Daramdin =

Multi-faith centre in Daramdin, Sikkim, India

Coordinates: 27.136°N 88.171°E

Sri Sathya Sai Sarva Dharma Kendra Daramdin is a multi religion centre built by the followers of the Sathya Sai Baba movement, located in Daramdin, a village in Sikkim, India. It is a major tourist destination in Sikkim.

== History ==
The foundation stone for Sri Sathya Sai Sarva Dharma Kendra Daramdin was laid in December 2002 by chief minister of Sikkim Pawan Kumar Chamling. The land for the religious centre was donated by a number of people mostly by Rizal family, Pradhan family and some part of it was bought for the construction. It was inaugurated by Shri Pawan Kumar Chamling in 2007.

== Management ==
Hundreds of visitors come to visit the center and offer their prayers. Mr K.N Rizal is the caretaker of the center since 2007. Annual events are held at the center by different religious groups.

== Misconception ==
It is often referred to as a Hindu temple, but it is an interfaith centre, for all religions.
