= Soreng–Chakung Assembly constituency =

Vidhan Sabha constituency in Sikkim, India

Coordinates: 27.169°N 88.200°E

Soreng-Chakung
- Constituency No. 7 for the Sikkim Legislative Assembly

Constituency details
- Country: India
- Region: Northeast India
- State: Sikkim
- District: Gyalshing district
- Lok Sabha constituency: Sikkim
- Established: 2008
- Total electors: 15,589
- Reservation: None

Member of Legislative Assembly
- 11th Sikkim Legislative Assembly
- Incumbent Aditya Tamang
- Party: SKM
- Alliance: NDA
- Elected year: 2024 by-election

Soreng–Chakung Assembly constituency is one of the 32 assembly constituencies of Sikkim state of India. Soreng-Chakung is part of Sikkim Lok Sabha constituency.

== Members of the Legislative Assembly ==
Election	Member	Party
2009	Ram Bahadur Subba	Sikkim Democratic Front
2014	Ram Bahadur Subba	Sikkim Democratic Front
2019	Aditya Tamang	Sikkim Krantikari Morcha
2024	Prem Singh Tamang	Sikkim Krantikari Morcha
2024^	Aditya Tamang	Sikkim Krantikari Morcha

^By-election

== Election results ==
=== Assembly By-Election 2024 ===
2024 Sikkim Legislative Assembly election: Soreng–Chakung
Party	Candidate	Votes	%	±%
SKM	Aditya Tamang	Unopposed		
SKM hold		Swing		

=== Assembly Election 2024 ===
2024 Sikkim Legislative Assembly election: Soreng–Chakung
Party	Candidate	Votes	%	±%
SKM	Prem Singh Tamang	10,480	72.18%	▲22.10
SDF	Dr. A D Subba	3,084	21.24%	▼27.25
CAP–Sikkim	Pobin Hang Subba	498	3.43%	New
BJP	Purna Singh Subba	330	2.27%	New
NOTA	None of the Above	128	0.88%	▼0.55
Margin of victory		7,396	50.94%	▲49.35
Turnout		14,520	86.74%	▲2.45
Registered electors		16,740		▲7.38
SKM hold		Swing	▲22.10	

=== Assembly election 2019 ===
2019 Sikkim Legislative Assembly election: Soreng–Chakung
Party	Candidate	Votes	%	±%
SKM	Aditya Tamang	6,580	50.08%	▲10.88
SDF	Sancha Raj Subba	6,372	48.49%	▼6.91
NOTA	None of the Above	188	1.43%	▼0.53
Margin of victory		208	1.58%	▼14.62
Turnout		13,140	84.29%	▼1.18
Registered electors		15,589		▲11.91
SKM gain from SDF		Swing	▼5.32	

=== Assembly election 2014 ===
2014 Sikkim Legislative Assembly election: Soreng–Chakung
Party	Candidate	Votes	%	±%
SDF	Ram Bahadur Subba	6,596	55.40%	▼11.10
SKM	Bharati Sharma	4,667	39.20%	New
NOTA	None of the Above	234	1.97%	New
INC	Pushker Limbu	212	1.78%	▼22.56
BJP	Sher Bahadur Karki	197	1.65%	New
Margin of victory		1,929	16.20%	▼25.96
Turnout		11,906	85.47%	▲0.85
Registered electors		13,930		▲20.65
SDF hold		Swing	▼11.10	

=== Assembly election 2009 ===
2009 Sikkim Legislative Assembly election: Soreng–Chakung
Party	Candidate	Votes	%	±%
SDF	Ram Bahadur Subba	6,497	66.50%	New
INC	Nar Bahadur Bhandari	2,378	24.34%	New
SHRP	Akar Dhoj Limbu	503	5.15%	New
NCP	Iman Singh Limbu	217	2.22%	New
Sikkim Gorkha Party	Metra Lall Pandey	175	1.79%	New
Margin of victory		4,119	42.16%	
Turnout		9,770	84.62%	
Registered electors		11,546		
SDF win (new seat)				

== See also ==
- Soreng
- Chakung
- West Sikkim district
- List of constituencies of Sikkim Legislative Assembly
