= Ram Bahadur Subba =

Politician from Sikkim, India

Ram Bahadur Subba is a Sikkim Democratic Front politician from Sikkim. He was elected in Sikkim Legislative Assembly election in 2009 and 2014 from Soreng-Chakung constituency as candidate of Sikkim Democratic Front. He was minister of Human Resource Development, Sports & Youth Affairs, Law & Legislative, Parliamentary Affairs in Pawan Chamling fifth ministry from 2014 to 2019.
