= Okhrey =

Coordinates: 27.1428°N 88.1027°E

Okhrey is a village situated in West Sikkim district, India.
