= Legship =

- Town
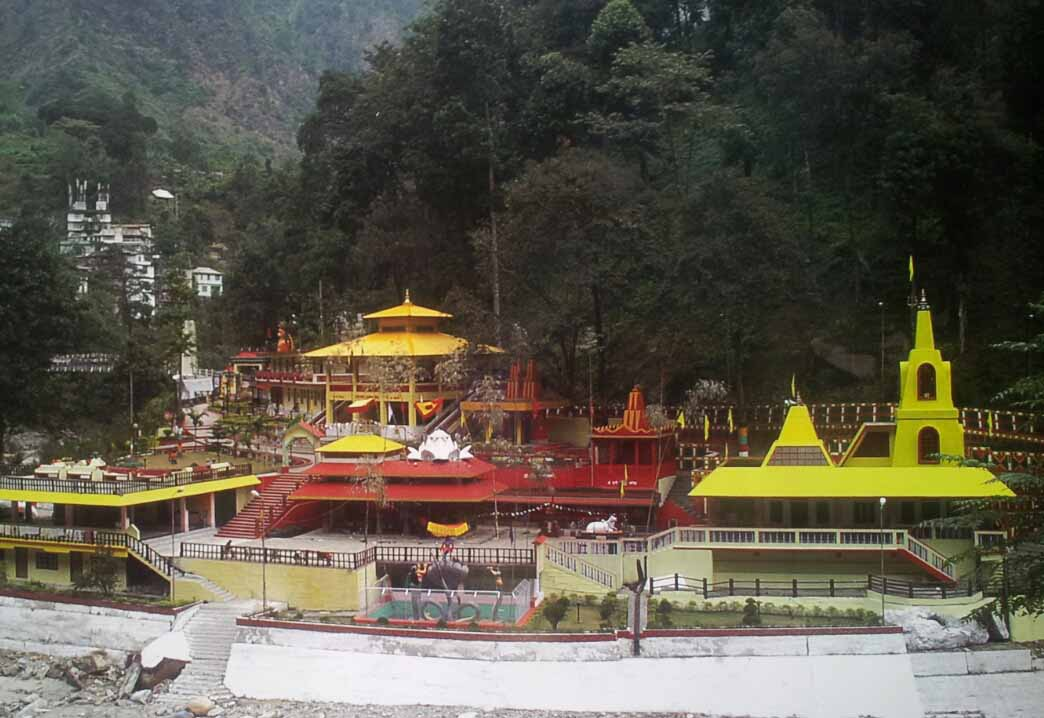
- View of shiva temple, Legship, Gyalshing district (Sikkim)
- Nickname: Gateway of Gyalshing
- Location in Sikkim, India Legship (India)
- Coordinates: 27.27°N 88.27°E
- Country: India
- State: Sikkim
- District: Gyalshing

Population (2009)
  - Total: 2,302

Languages
  - Official: English; Nepali; Sikkimese; Lepcha
  - Additional official: Gurung; Limbu; Magar; Mukhia; Newari; Rai; Sherpa; Tamang
- Time zone: UTC+5:30 (IST)
- PIN: 737 111
- STD: 03595
- Vehicle registration: SK

Legship is a small town in Gyalshing district of the Indian State of Sikkim. Legship is the gateway to Gyalshing City. It is located on the main road connecting Gyalshing with the rest of the state, on the banks of the river Rangit. The place is in fact a main crossing point of roads from Yuksam, Tashiding, Kewzing, Rabangla, Gangtok, Jorethang, Pelling, Gyalshing and other places.

Legship is also the spot for a large hydro-electric dam. The Rangit Dam lies up stream, a dam which the people of Legship were partly responsible for. The large lake formed by the Rangit Dam is also the spot where locals visit for day outing or picnic. The place is known as Rangit Water World and rafting facility is available here. A place of interest is the Kirateshwar Mahadev Temple which is believed to be one of the holiest and oldest Shiv temples in Sikkim. Another place of interest is Lho Khando Sang Pho is one of the four famous caves in Sikkim which is six kilometers away from Legship.

== Etymology ==
Legship is actually pronounced as "Lyuksyep" and mispronounced as Legship. It means a kind of fern, which tastes like a chilli — in the Lepcha language, as the area when sparsely inhabited was a dense jungle of these ferns and the Lepchas named the place in the name of this fern.

== District ==
Gyalshing or Gayzing (Nepali: गेजिंग) is the capital of the district of West Sikkim in the Indian state of Sikkim. All the Government Offices, District Headquarter are located here. The town is connected to the capital Gangtok by a metalled road. Geyzing is also connected to the West Bengal towns of Siliguri, Darjeeling and Kalimpong via Jorethang. A few kilometres north is the town of Pelling. The town has a large Nepali population, and the Nepali language is the predominant language of the region. The town is situated at an altitude of about 6,500 feet (2,000 m). The town enjoys a temperate climate for most of the year and snow sometimes falls in the vicinity.

== Place of Interest ==
=== Rangit Dam ===
The Ranjit River on which the Rangit Dam is located, is a major right bank tributary of the Teesta River in Sikkim. The river arises from the Talung glacier and it meets the Teesta river at Melli after a travel of 61 kilometres (38 miles) from its source. At the dam site, the catchment area drained is 979.02 square kilometres (378.00 mi^{2}) (rain-fed catchment is 712 square kilometres (275 mi^{2}) and the balance area is snow fed above snow line contour of 4,570 metres (14,990 feet)); elevation of the catchment area varies from about 600 metres (2,000 feet) to about 7,338 metres (24,075 feet) (North Kabru Peak) and is delimited between (27.275°N 88.0141°E) and (27.6195°N 88.42°E). A number of perennial streams originate in glacial fields of the river basin; important snow-fed rivers which constitute the Rangit basin above the dam site are the Rathong Chu, Rimbi Chu, Prek Chu, Ralli Chu, Rongdon Chu and Kayam Chu. The drainage pattern is sub-dendentric.

=== Kirateshwar Mahadev Temple ===
Kirateshwar Mahadev Temple is a Hindu temple, identified to be a Hindu pilgrimage site which is located in Legship, West Sikkim, India along the banks of River Rangeet, which has many mythological episodes of the Mahabharata attached to it. The main attraction of the temple are the festival of the Bala Chaturdesi, which is observed in November–December every year and the Shiv Ratri also known as Maha Shivaratri which falls in the month of February or March every year. There are other temples dedicated to Lord Rama and Durga can be found here making it an important pilgrimage destination for Hindus.

=== Lho Khando Sang Pho ===
Lho Khando Sang Pho is one of the four famous caves in Sikkim, where Guru Rempoche the 8th century great Indian Buddhist Tantric yogi meditated. The three other caves are Nub Dechenphu, Chyang Lhari Ngingphu and Sharcho Phephu which are in the other three directions. This is this cave where Guru Rempoche tamed a female demon.
