= Rangeet River =

River in Sikkim, India

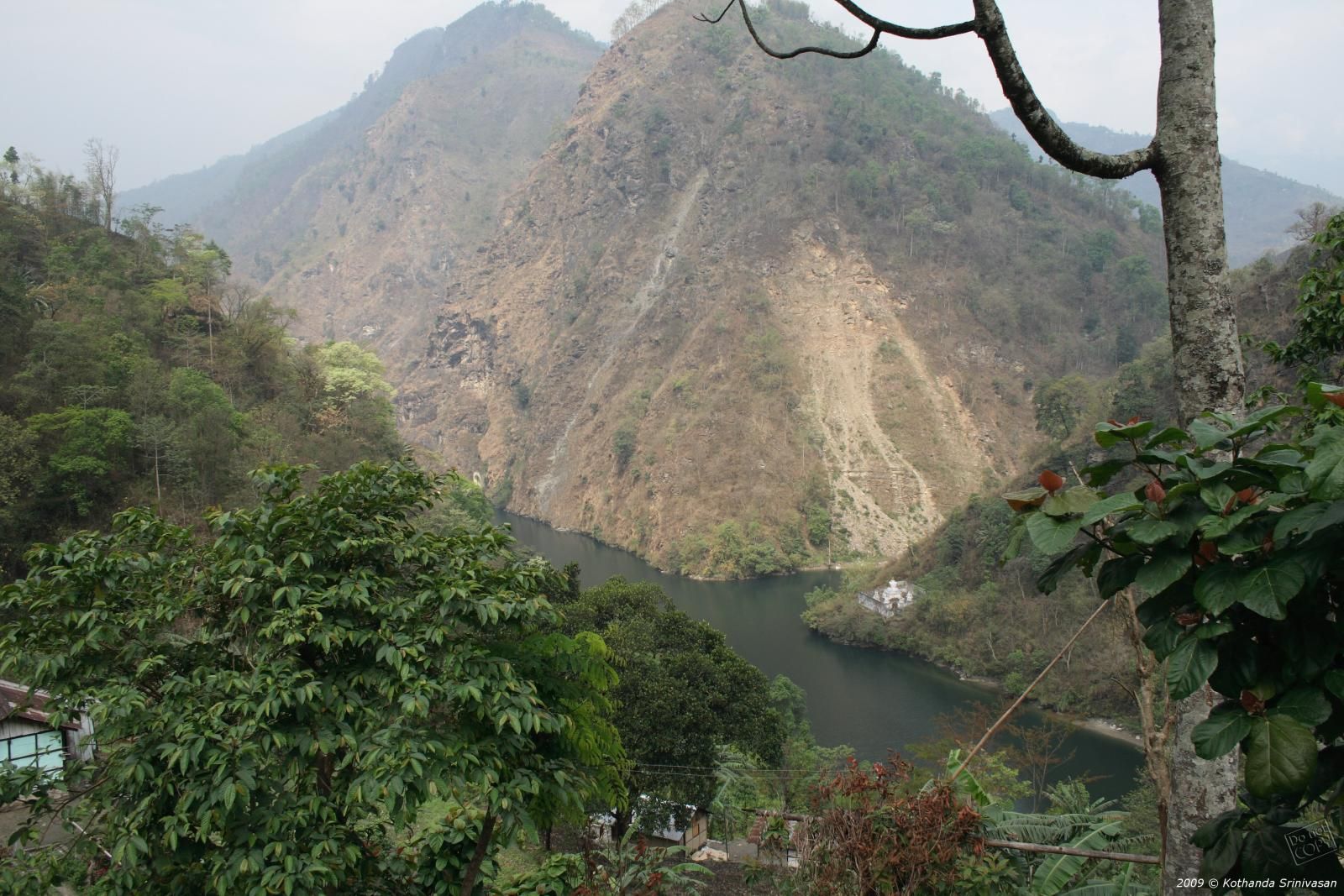

- Rangeet River in Sikkim Rangeet River (West Bengal) Rangeet River (India)

Location
- Country: India
- State: Sikkim

Physical characteristics
- Source: Himalayas
  - location: Himalayas, Sikkim, India
  - coordinates: 27.3639°N 88.3905°E
- Mouth: Teesta River
  - location: South Sikkim district, Sikkim, India
  - coordinates: 27.07952°N 88.4331°E

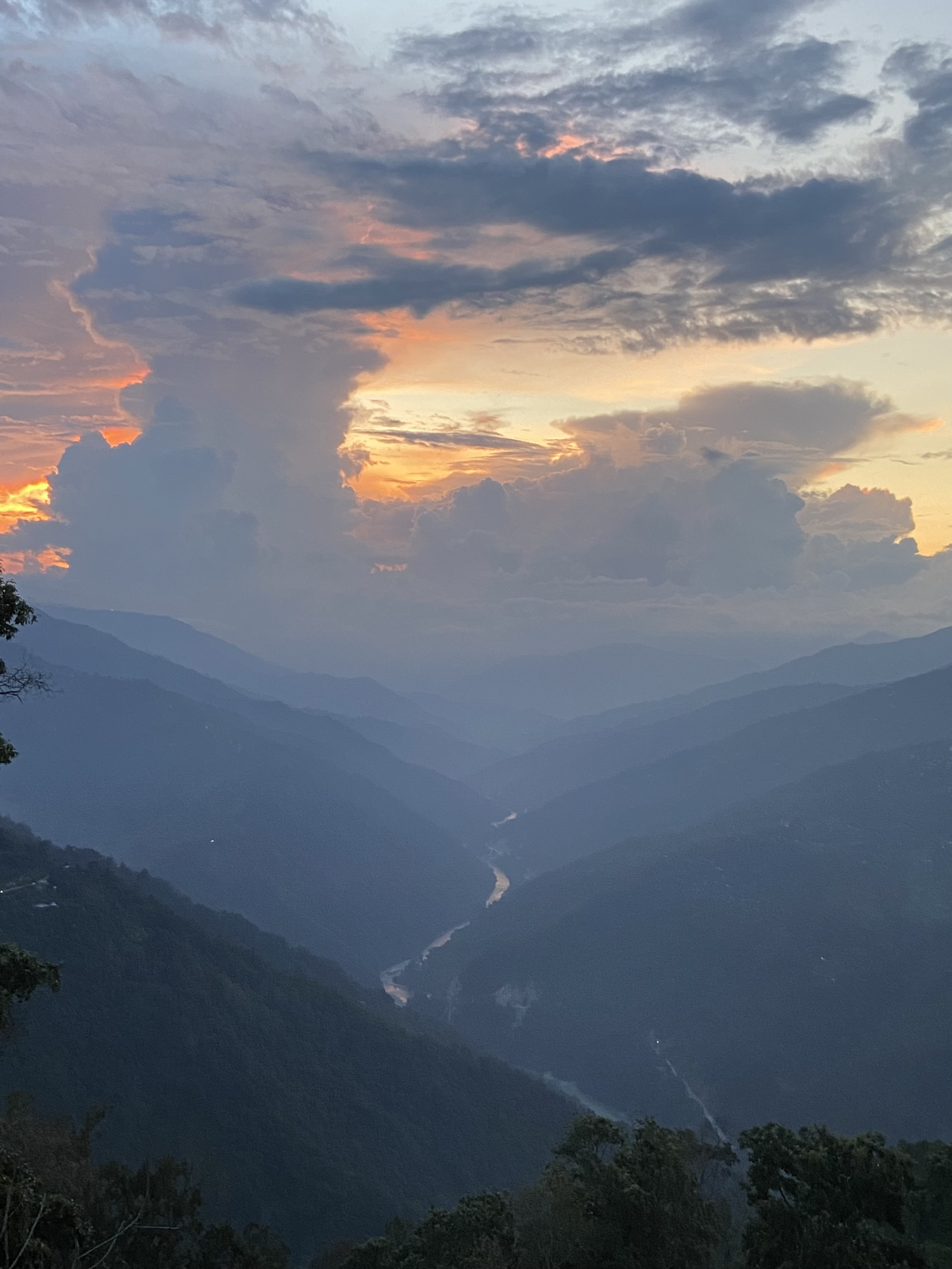
Rangeet river visible from Kalimpong as it snakes through mountain ridges.

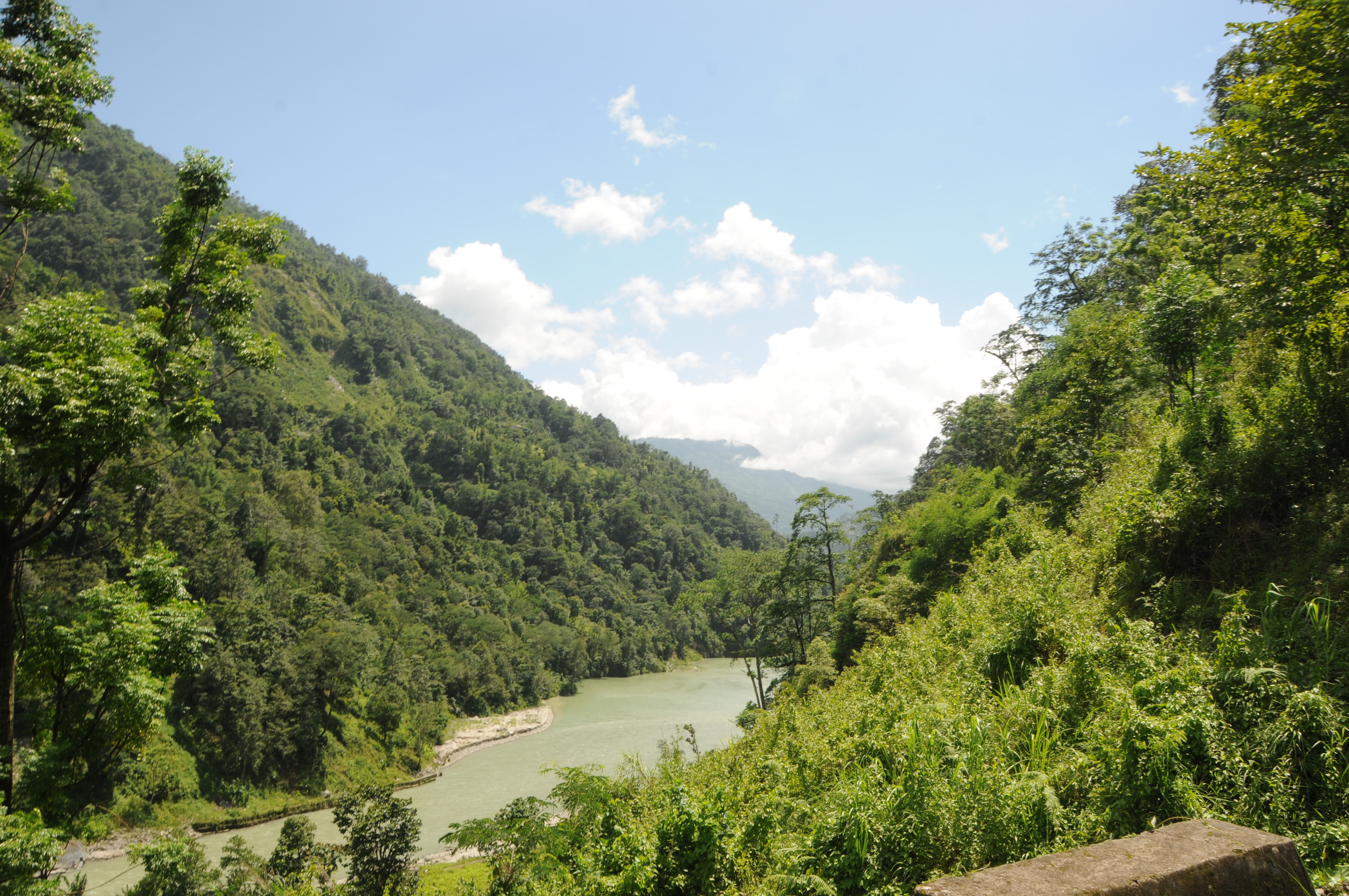
Rangeet River near Tashiding, South Sikkim

The Rangeet or Rangit is a tributary of the Teesta River, which is the largest river in the Indian state of Sikkim. The Rangeet originates in the Himalayan mountains in West Sikkim district. The river also forms the boundary between Sikkim and Darjeeling district. A perennial river, it is fed by the melting snow of the Himalayas in early summer and the monsoon rains in June–September. It is popular among rafting enthusiasts owing to its turbulent waters. The river flows past the towns of Jorethang, Pelling and Legship. During its final few kilometres, it joins the Teesta River at a confluence known as Tribeni, which is a popular picnic spot. The Rangeet River has an NHPC hydropower plant with a capacity of 60 megawatts (80,000 hp) in Sikkim.
