= Kaluk =

Coordinates: 27.2319°N 88.2516°E

Kaluk is a small village located in the Himalayan foothills of West Sikkim, near the West Sikkim capital of Gyalshing in East India. Kangchenjunga, the world's third highest peak, is visible from Kaluk. It is one of the windiest places in Sikkim and noted for destinations like the Durga Mandir, Rinchenpong Gumba, and Megi Dara. The people of this area are dependent on agriculture and horticulture for their livelihood. Tourism also plays an economic role in the region.

== Demographics ==
Kaluk is populated by a mix of Nepalis of Sikkimese Origin, Bhutias and Lepchas

== Infrastructure ==
Kaluk is served by the Kaluk Senior Secondary School as well as the private schools West Point Academy and Don Bosco School.
