= Jorethang =

- Nagar panchayat
- Jorethang Nagar Panchayat
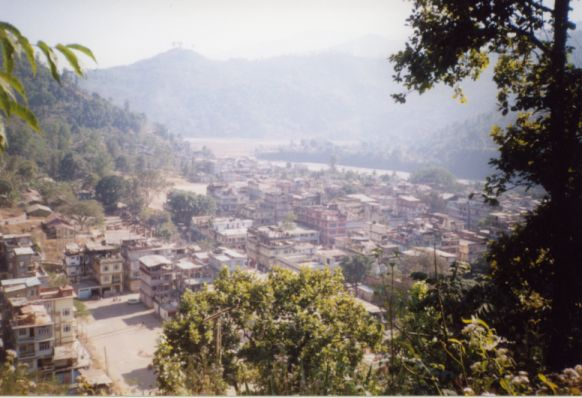
- Jorethang in 2006

- Location in Sikkim, India Jorethang (India)
- Coordinates: 27.131°N 88.283°E
- Country: India
- State: Sikkim
- District: Namchi

Government
  - Type: Nagar Panchayat
- Elevation: 322 m (1,056 ft)

Population (2011)
  - Total: 9,009

Languages
  - Official: Nepali, Bhutia, Lepcha
  - Other: Limbu, Newari, Rai, Gurung, Magar, Sherpa, Tamang and Sunwar
- Time zone: UTC+5:30 (IST)
- PIN: 737121
- Vehicle registration: SK-04

Jorethang is a major town in Namchi district in the Indian state of Sikkim. Jorethang lies on the bank of Rangeet River, which is a tributary of the Teesta River, on the way to Pelling from Darjeeling, Siliguri and Kalimpong. Jorethang is and has been a major connecting route towards the western part of Sikkim where people from various districts of West Sikkim visit here for consumption of various goods and services.

== Demographics ==
As of the 2011 Census of India, Jorethang had a population of 9,009. Males constitute 52% of the population and females 48%. Jorethang has an average literacy rate of 88.85%, higher than the state average of 81.42%: male literacy is 93.36%, and female literacy is 84.20%. In Jorethang, 10.63% of the population is under 6 years of age.

=== Religion ===
Hinduism is the most widely practiced religion followed by Christianity, Buddhism, Islam and others.

Religious Demographic in Jorethang Nagar Pachayat (2011)
1. Hinduism (68.7%)
2. Christianity (13.3%)
3. Buddhism (10.8%)
4. Islam (6.69%)
5. Others (0.46%)

=== Languages ===
Languages spoken in Jorethang Nagar Pachayat (2011)
1. Nepali (61.3%)
2. Hindi (17.9%)
3. Bhojpuri (6.33%)
4. Marwari (2.56%)
5. Limbu (2.19%)
6. Bengali (2.16%)
7. Tamang (1.52%)
8. Urdu (1.24%)
9. Bhutia (1.07%)
10. Marathi (0.69%)
11. Lepcha (0.66%)
12. Others (2.42%)

== Education ==
Schools in Jorethang offer primary, secondary and senior secondary education. There are various school like New Buds Academy, St. Francis' School, Little Angles Academy, Mt.Olive Academy, Govt. Sen. Sec. School.

== Maghe Sankranti Mela ==
This festival is held on the first of Magh in the Bikram Samwat Nepali calendar (about 14 January), marking the sun's entrance into Makara rashi (Capricorn). It is one of the main festivals celebrated by the Nepali community in Sikkim dating from 1961.
