= Soreng district =

- District of Sikkim
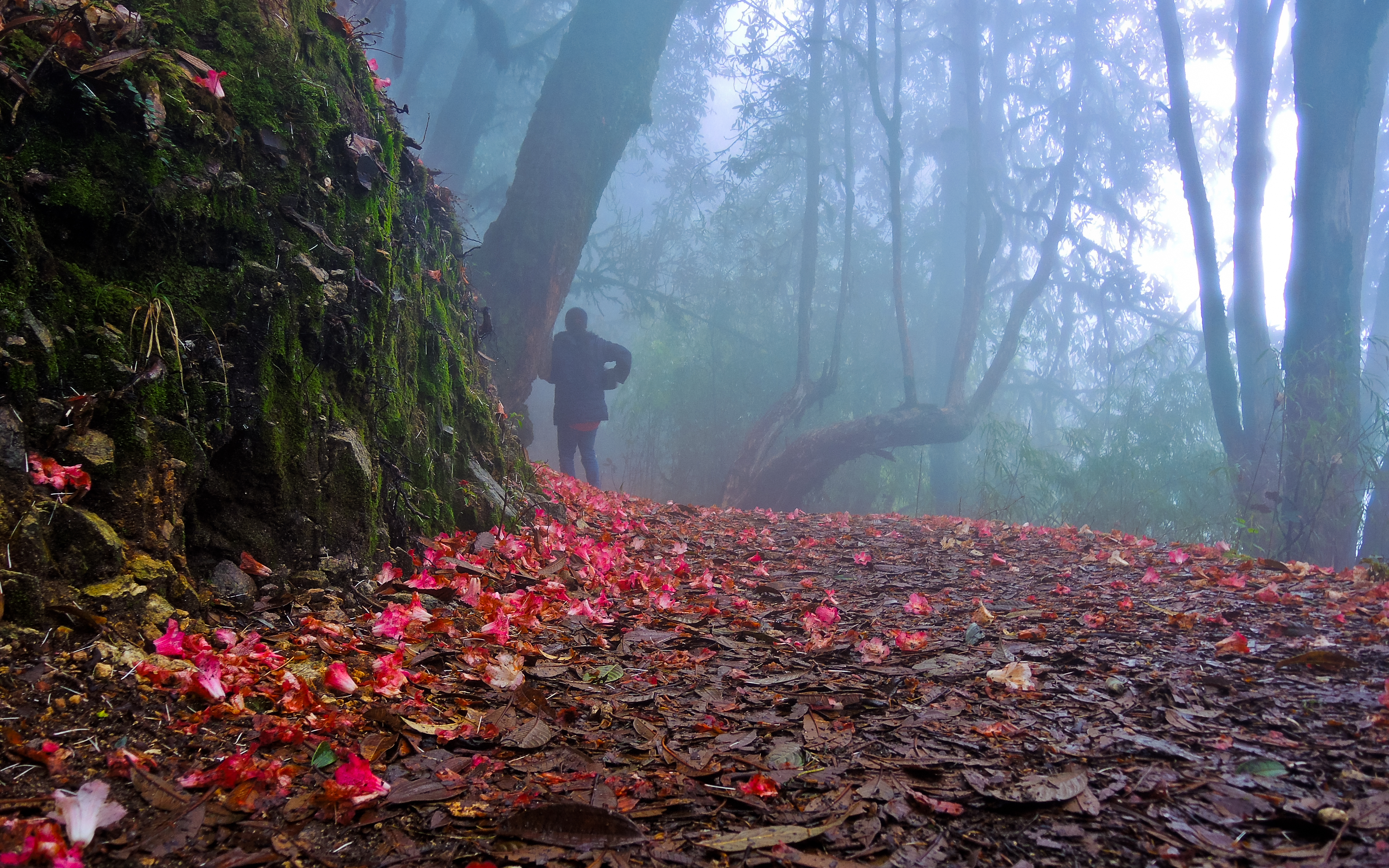
- Varsey Rhododendron Sanctuary in late April, with flowers in full bloom

- Location in Sikkim
- Coordinates: 27.2°N 88.2°E
- Country: India
- State: Sikkim
- Headquarters: Soreng
- Time zone: UTC+05:30 (IST)
- ISO 3166 code: IN-SK
- Website: soreng.nic.in

Soreng district is a district in the Indian state of Sikkim, administered from Soreng. Soreng District was officially created from Gyalshing District (then West Sikkim) in December 2021 by The Sikkim (re-Organization of District) Act, 2021, hence becoming the sixth district of Sikkim. Its shares borders with Nepal on its west, Gyalshing district to north, Namchi district to east and Darjeeling district of West Bengal to the south.

== Demographics ==
Religion in Soreng district (2011)
Hinduism	49.77%
Buddhism	27.42%
Christianity	13.37%
Other (mainly Kirat Mundhum)	8.72%
Islam	0.45%
Other or not stated	0.27%

At the time of the 2011 census, what is now Soreng District had a population of 64,760. Soreng District had a sex ratio of 959 females per 1000 males and a literacy rate of 77.68%. 1.91% of the population lived in urban areas. Scheduled Castes and Scheduled Tribes made up 2,544 (3.93%) and 25,970 (40.10%) respectively.

Languages of Soreng district (2011)
1. Nepali (65.1%)
2. Limbu (14.1%)
3. Lepcha (5.05%)
4. Sherpa (3.47%)
5. Tamang (3.39%)
6. Bhotia (2.62%)
7. Rai (1.97%)
8. Hindi (1.45%)
9. Others (2.81%)

At the time of the 2011 Census of India, 65.11% of the population in the district spoke Nepali, 14.13% Limbu, 5.05% Lepcha, 3.47% Sherpa, 3.39% Tamang, 2.62% Bhotia, 1.97% Rai and 1.45% Hindi as their first language.

== See also ==
- Ambotey
