= Soreng =

- Town
- Location in Sikkim, India Soreng (India)
- Coordinates: 27.17°N 88.20°E
- Country: India
- State: Sikkim
- District: Soreng

Government
  - Type: Municipal Council
  - Body: Soreng Municipal Council

Population (2011)
  - Total: 3,818

Languages
  - Official: English; Nepali; Sikkimese; Lepcha
  - Additional official: Gurung; Limbu; Magar; Mukhia; Newari; Rai; Sherpa; Tamang
- Time zone: UTC+5:30 (IST)
- Vehicle registration: SK 06

Soreng is a town and headquarters of the Soreng district in the Indian state of Sikkim. Soreng was carved as a new district from erstwhile West Sikkim on 21 Dec 2021. Soreng is known for its production of oranges, ginger, large cardamom, vegetables and flowers. The inhabitants are mostly dependent on agriculture, horticulture and tourism for their livelihood and are mostly Sikkimese, Nepali. The majority of the community follow Hinduism and Buddhism while the rest are Christians.

Soreng is about 45 kilometres (28 mi) by road from Darjeeling and 102 kilometres (63 mi) from the capital Gangtok. The region is an Ecotourism spot, and thousands of people visit every year. It is close to Daramdin.

The area's major attractions are its landscapes, fisheries, views of Mount Kangchenjunga, flora fauna, and white river rafting on the Teesta River.

In 2024 assembly elections, Prem Singh Tamang succeeded 2019 candidate Aditya Golay Tamang both from (Sikkim Krantikari Morcha) as present acting MLA of the region.
