= Lachung Monastery =

Buddhist monastery in Sikkim, India

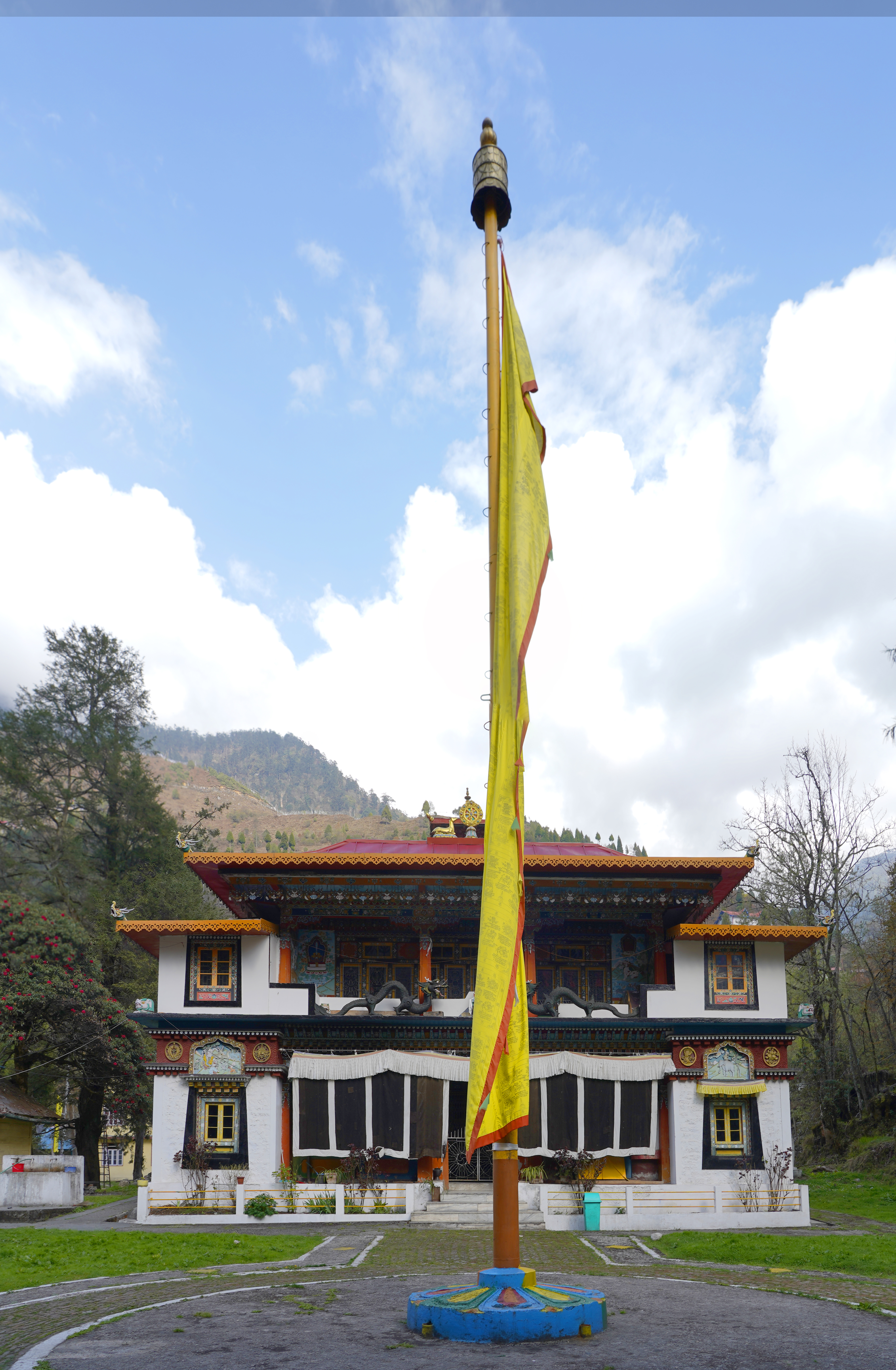
- Beautiful view of Lachung Monastery in Mangan district (Sikkim)

- Location with in Sikkim, India

Religion
- Affiliation: Tibetan Buddhism
- Sect: Nyingma

Location
- Location: Lachung, Mangan district, Sikkim, India
- Country: India
- Interactive map of Lachung Monastery
- Coordinates: 27.61667°N 88.65°E

Architecture
- Established: 1880; 146 years ago

Lachung Monastery is a Nyingma Buddhist gompa in the Lachung Valley in Mangan district in Northeastern Indian state of Sikkim. It is approx. 50 km from Mangan town, the district headquarters. It was established in 1880.

Lachung means a 'small mountain'. Lachung is at an elevation of about 3,000 m (9,600 ft) at the confluence of the Lachen River and Lachung River, tributaries of the Teesta River. The village is 118 km from Gangtok on the North Sikkim Highway and is the last one before the Indo-Chinese border. It was a trading post between India and Tibet before China forcefully annexed Tibet in 1950. Permits are required for visits to Mangan (Sikkim). The monastery hosts a famous mask dance each year.
