= Shingba Rhododendron Sanctuary =

Nature park in the Indian state of Sikkim

- IUCN category IV (habitat/species management area)
- Location within Sikkim Location within India
- Interactive map of Shingba Rhododendron Sanctuary
- Location: North Sikkim, Sikkim
- Nearest city: Lachung
- Coordinates: 27°50′28″N 88°44′21″E
- Area: 43 ha (110 acres)
- Established: 1984
- Visitors: NA (in NA)
- Governing body: Ministry of Environment and Forests, Government of India

Shingba Rhododendron Sanctuary is a nature park in the Indian state of Sikkim. It has forty species of rhododendron trees. It is located in the Yumthang Valley of Flowers north of Lachung in North Sikkim district. Bird species found in the park include Wood snipe and Hoary-throated barwing. The sanctuary is part of the Sacred Himalayan Landscape.
