= Chungthang =

Chungthang Tsunthang
- Town
- Chungthang
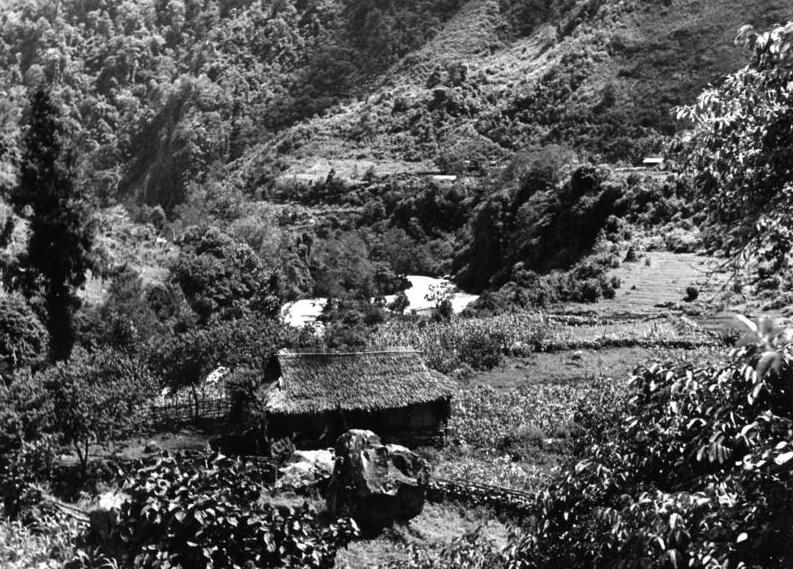
- View of Chungthang, 1938 in (Mangan district, Sikkim)

- Location in Sikkim, India Chungthang (India)
- Coordinates: 27.6045°N 88.645583°E
- Country: India
- State: Sikkim
- District: Mangan
- Elevation: 1,790 m (5,870 ft)

Population (2011)
  - Total: 3,970

Languages
  - Official: Sikkimese, Lepcha
- Time zone: UTC+5:30 (IST)
- Vehicle registration: SK

Chungthang is a town in Mangan district in the Indian state of Sikkim. It is located just 28 km from Mangan town, the district headquarters. It is situated at the confluence of the Lachen and Lachung rivers, which combine to form the Teesta River. Located at a distance of 95 kilometres (59 mi) from the state capital Gangtok, the Indian Army has a major forward base with a medical centre in Chungthang. The Sikhs has a very beautiful Gurdwara here and always came forward as a help in the need of time.

== Geography ==
Chungthang is located at 27.62°N 88.63°E. It has an average elevation of 1,790 metres (5,870 ft). It is located within the India Standard Time Zone (GMT+5:30)

Sikkim is a small landlocked state nestled in the Himalayas in northern India. It is situated at the confluence of two rivers: Lachen River and Lachung Chu, both tributaries of the 'most scenic' River Teesta. The thumb-shaped state borders Nepal in the west, the Chinese Tibet Autonomous Region to the north and east, Bhutan in the south-east and the Indian state of West Bengal to its south.

Chungthang is located in this state at a distance of 95 kilometres from the capital Gangtok, at an elevation of 1,700 metres (5,600 ft). Guru Dongmar is a lake at a height of 18,000 feet alongside a glacial peak known by the same name. The lake remains frozen most of the year due to heavy snowfall for almost six months each year.

== History ==
Chungthang Valley is believed to be a holy place which has been blessed by Guru Padmasambhava, the patron saint of Sikkim. There is a rock here which to this day bears the handprints and footprints of Saint Padmasambhava. From a small opening in the rock there is continuous flow of mineral water. There is a small patch of land here from which grows paddy every year. The nature defying miracle is believed to be the blessing of Guru Padmasambhava who sprinkled a handful of grain on the spot that has sprouted paddy ever since. Chungthang is a good place to halt before one takes off for the more alpine regions of Lachen, Lachung and the Yumthang Valley. Chungthang is mired in myths and legends, one such being that this is the place from where the word 'Demazong' first originated. It means 'the hidden valley of rice' as Sikkim is known.

As per Denjong Nye-Yig (The Pilgrim's Guide to The Hidden Land of Sikkim, by Jigme Pawo, reincarnation of Gyalwa Lhatsun Chenpo) the name of the north Sikkim located settlement of Chungthang or Tsunthang, as is the actual pronunciation, is derived from the word 'Tsemo Rinchen Thang' meaning 'top precious plain'.

This place is revered by Buddhists for its sacred rock, known as 'Lhedo' or 'Neydo', which was blessed and bears body imprints and footprints of Guru Padmasambhava/Guru Rinpoche. There is a perennial source of holy water at the site too.

During the eight century AD, Guru Rinpoche, who hailed from the Swat region in present-day northwest Pakistan or from the Indian state of Odisha, visited Tibet at the invitation of the Tibetan emperor, Trisong Deutsen and introduced the practice of Tantric Buddhism to the Tibetans. He is regarded as the founder of the ancient and old Nyingma tradition of Tibetan Buddhism and is also said to have established Samye Monastery, the oldest Buddhist monastery in Tibet.

On his way back from Tibet, Guru Rinpoche is believed to have halted at Tsunthang/Chungthang where he subjugated a mischievous demon called 'Deutsen' who had been reluctant to come under the Guru's spiritual domain. The paddy field located next to the Lhedo/Neydo is considered sacred, as according to Buddhist religious tradition, paddy started growing here after Guru Rinpoche, following a meal, threw some leftover rice at the very spot. This is considered a miracle as paddy normally does not grow in the area.

It is further believed that Guru Rinpoche personally consecrated the site, where later, Lepcha Buddhists built a monastery in 1788 AD and named it as Tsunthang Ridgzin Choeling Gonpa.

Chungthang Valley is believed to be a holy place of Sikhs also which has been blessed by Guru Nanak itself, and has many stories in connection to the visit of Guru Nanank during his Udassis.

== Population ==
Most of the residents of the town are the Lepchas and they follows Buddhist religion and Christianity. Chungthang is rich in biodiversity with a wide variety of orchids, plants and animals. As of the 2001 Census of India, the village had a population of 3,766 with a population density of approximately three persons per hectare.

== Political changes ==
With growing Chinese influences on local Sikkimese people and influx of number of Tibetans into many areas of Sikkim, many Buddhist monasteries have sprouted supported by local Self Government (Dzumsa) and some even by converting a Sikh Gurdwara at Dongmar at the bank of Gurudongmar Lake which was built at instance of Indian army recognising history of Guru Nanak's visit there and existed there since 2002. Even Gurdwara Nanak lama at Chungthang built by officers of Assam Rifles in 1970 is in danger of sacrilege.

== Banking facilities ==
Only SBI is currently opening a branch in Chungthang.

- State Bank of India, Chungthang

== See also ==
- 2023 Sikkim flash floods
