= Lachung River =

River in Sikkim, India

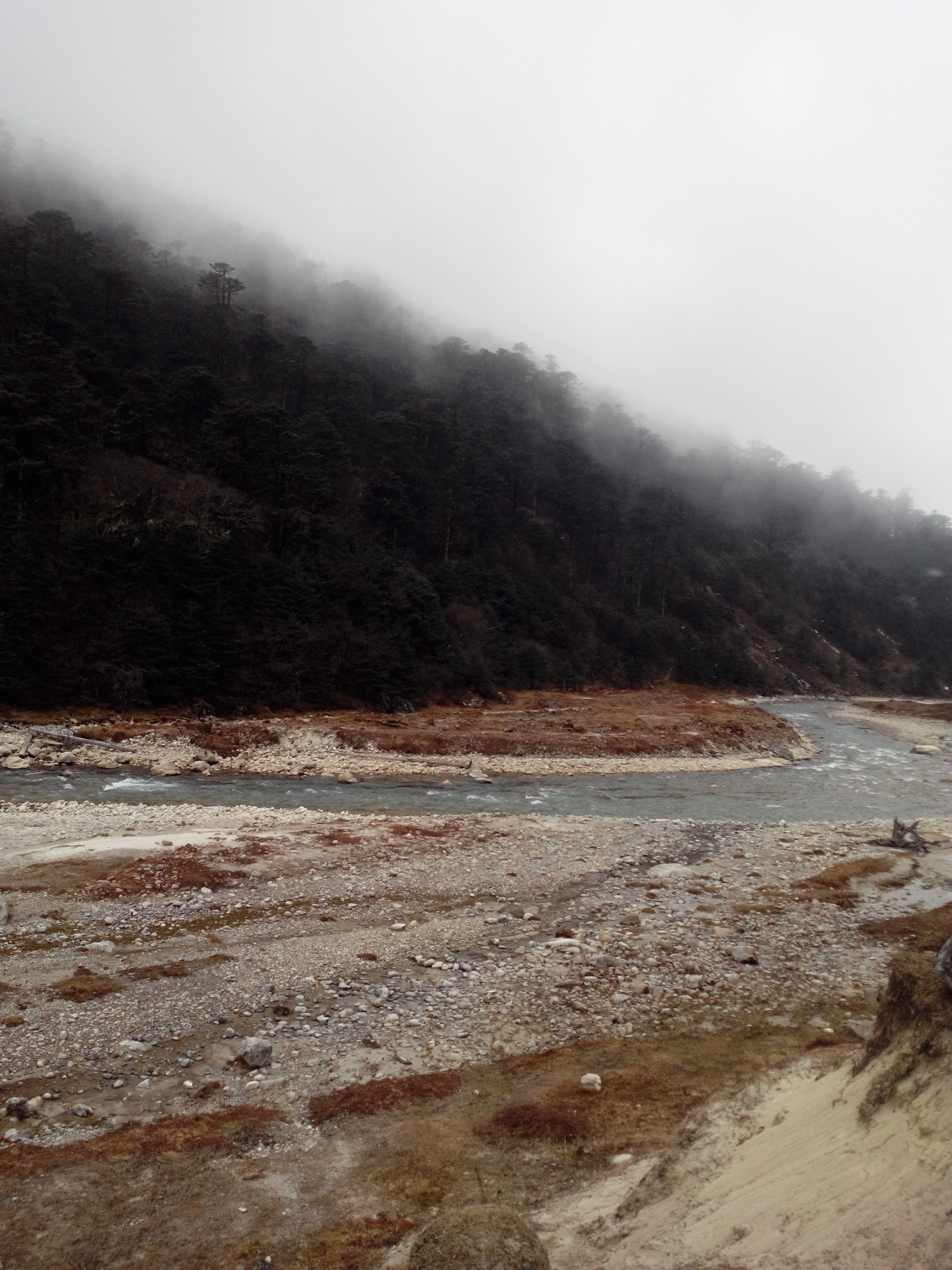
- Native name: Lachung Chu (Sherpa)

Location
- Country: India
- State: Sikkim

Physical characteristics
- Source: Himalayas
  - location: Himalayas, Sikkim, India
- Mouth: Teesta River
  - location: Gangtok district, Sikkim, India

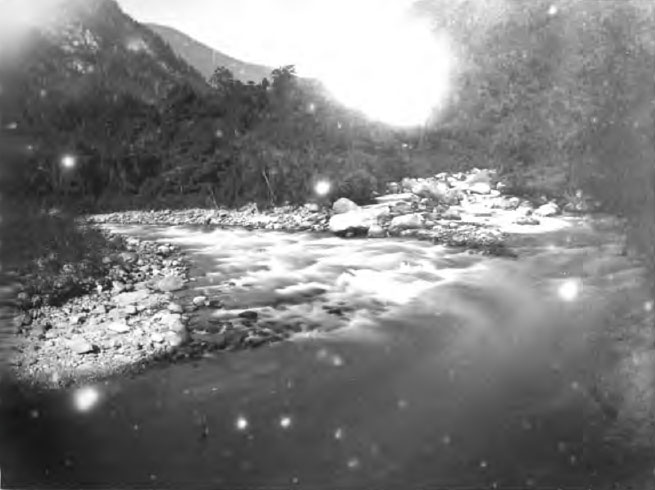
Confluence of the Lachen and Lachung Rivers c. 1885

The Lachung River is a tributary of the Teesta River located in the East Indian state of Sikkim. It is a chief tributary of the Teesta, which is an important river in Sikkim along with Rangeet River. The village of Lachung is perched on the craggy bank of the river approximately 23 kilometres (14 mi) from Chungthang. It is at Chungthang where the Lachung and Lachen rivers converge and give rise to the Teesta. The river is 2,500 metres (8,200 ft) above sea level.

== Course ==
The river has its source in a lake, deep in the Himalayas near the Indo-China border. The ragged reaches of the mountain make the place almost inaccessible. From here, the river flows down in a south-westerly direction and joins with another unknown river at a place just above Lachung village. The tributary river is also a slender one with little water in the winter. The river continues its course downwards through the Lachung valley till it meets River Lachen near Chungthang. After the confluence, it takes the name of River Teesta and flows further down. It becomes wider while travelling to Singhik and drops from altitude of 1,550 to 750 metres (5,090 to 2,460 ft). At Singhik another tributary river joins it, called the Talung Chug. After this point the river flows to Dikchu through a deep ravine and drops to a height of 550 metres (1,800 ft). Then it cambers and reaches Singtam, which is at a height of 200 metres (660 ft). After Rangpo, the Teesta widens and meets the River Rangeet at Melli Bazaar.

== Tributaries ==
The Lachung has one main tributary, with which it unites near Lachung village. The water of the river is crystal clear and pure. The sparkling waters are the major source of living in the surrounding villages. There are a number of waterfalls and subsidiary streams across this river. In lachung town, there's banned package drinking water and total restrictions for usage. The crystal clear lachung water is used for drinking

== Amitabh Bachchan Falls ==
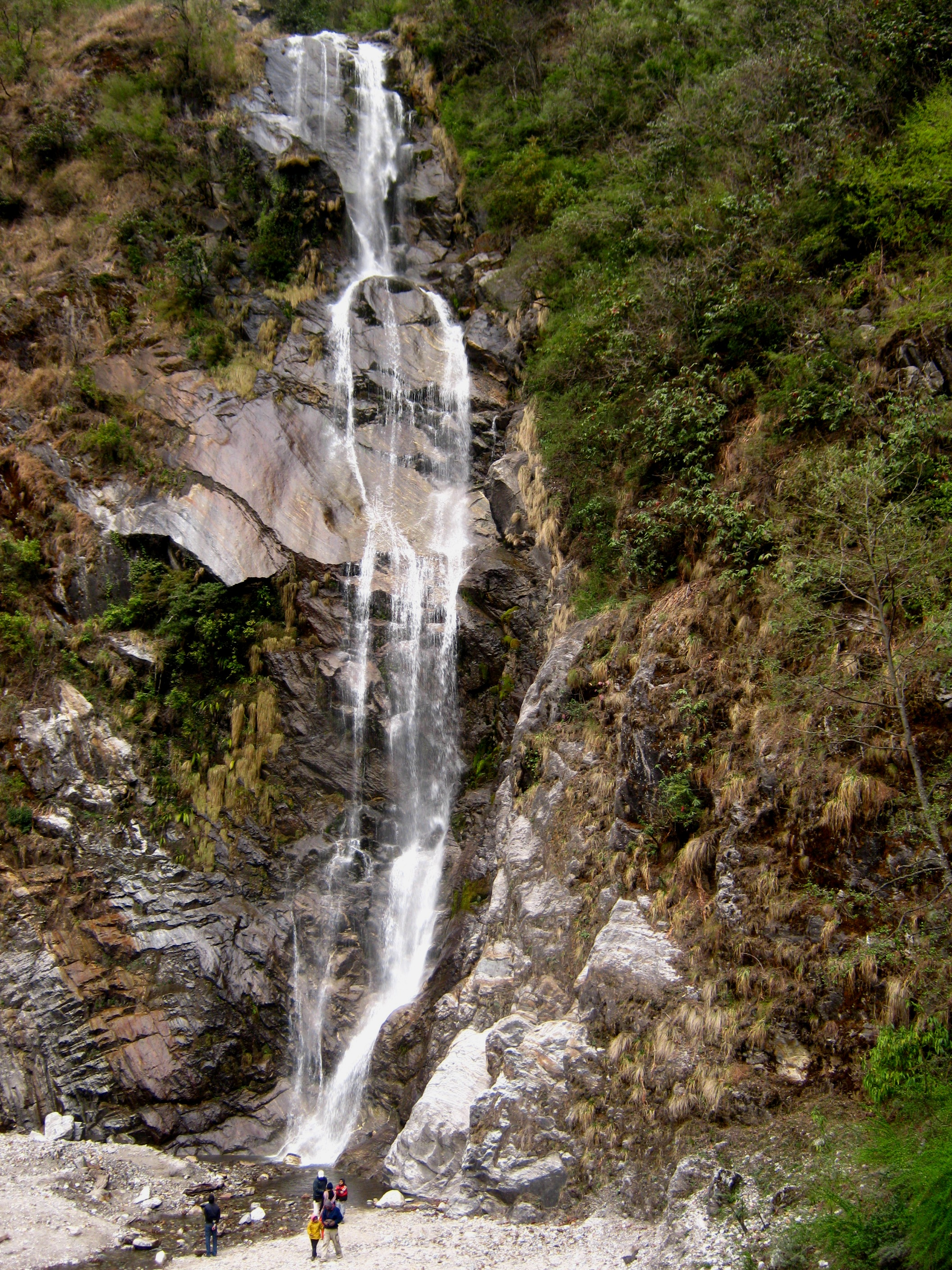
Amitabh Bachchan Falls

Amitabh Bachchan Falls (real name is Bhewma Falls; 27.63381°N 88.70406°E) lies on the road connecting Chungthang to Yumthang Valley in Lachung, North Sikkim district of Sikkim. It has believed to have gotten the name Amitabh Bachchan Falls from the Bollywood star Amitabh Bachchan, who is very tall.

== Images ==
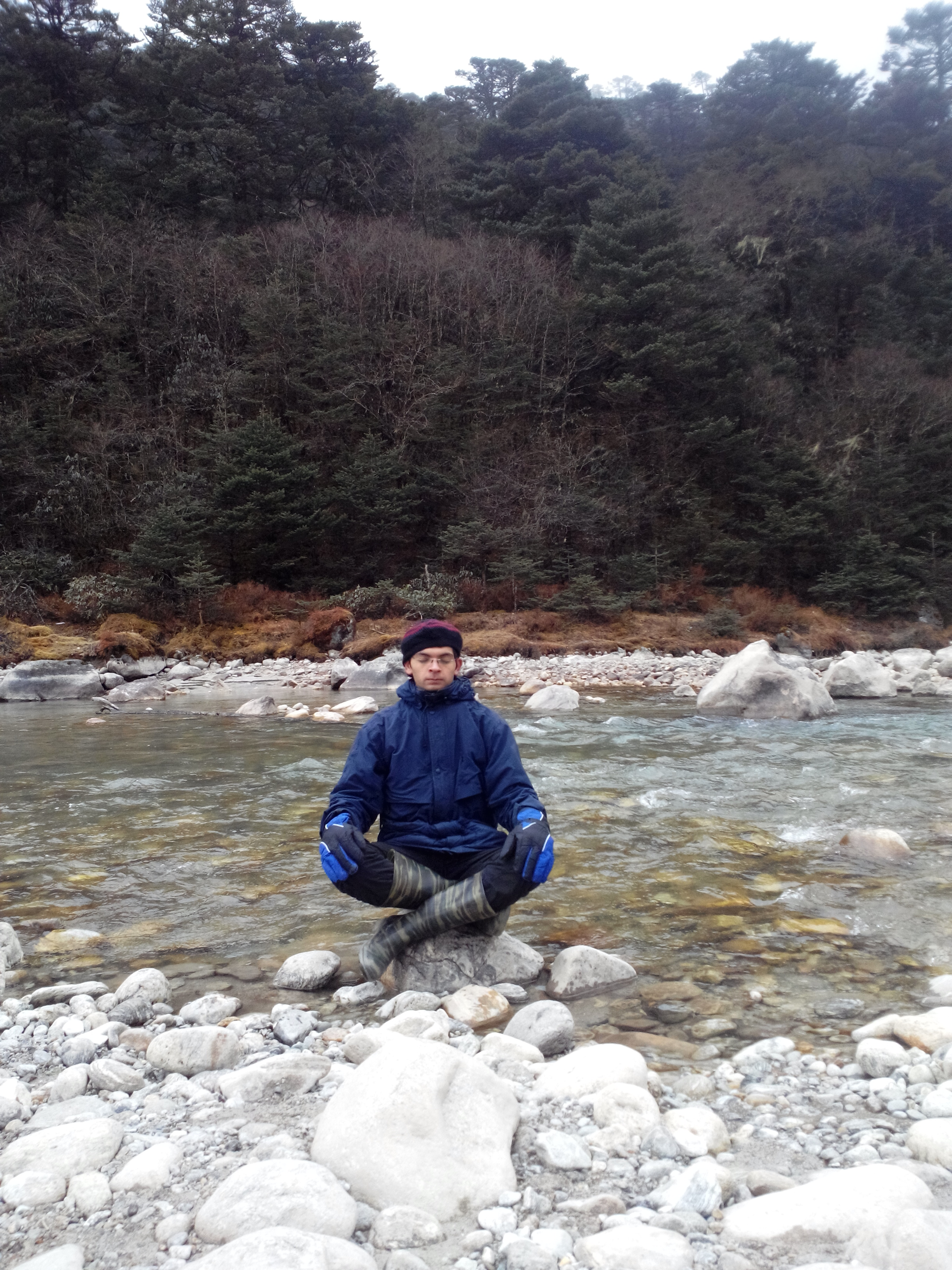
Meditation Lachung River North Sikkim

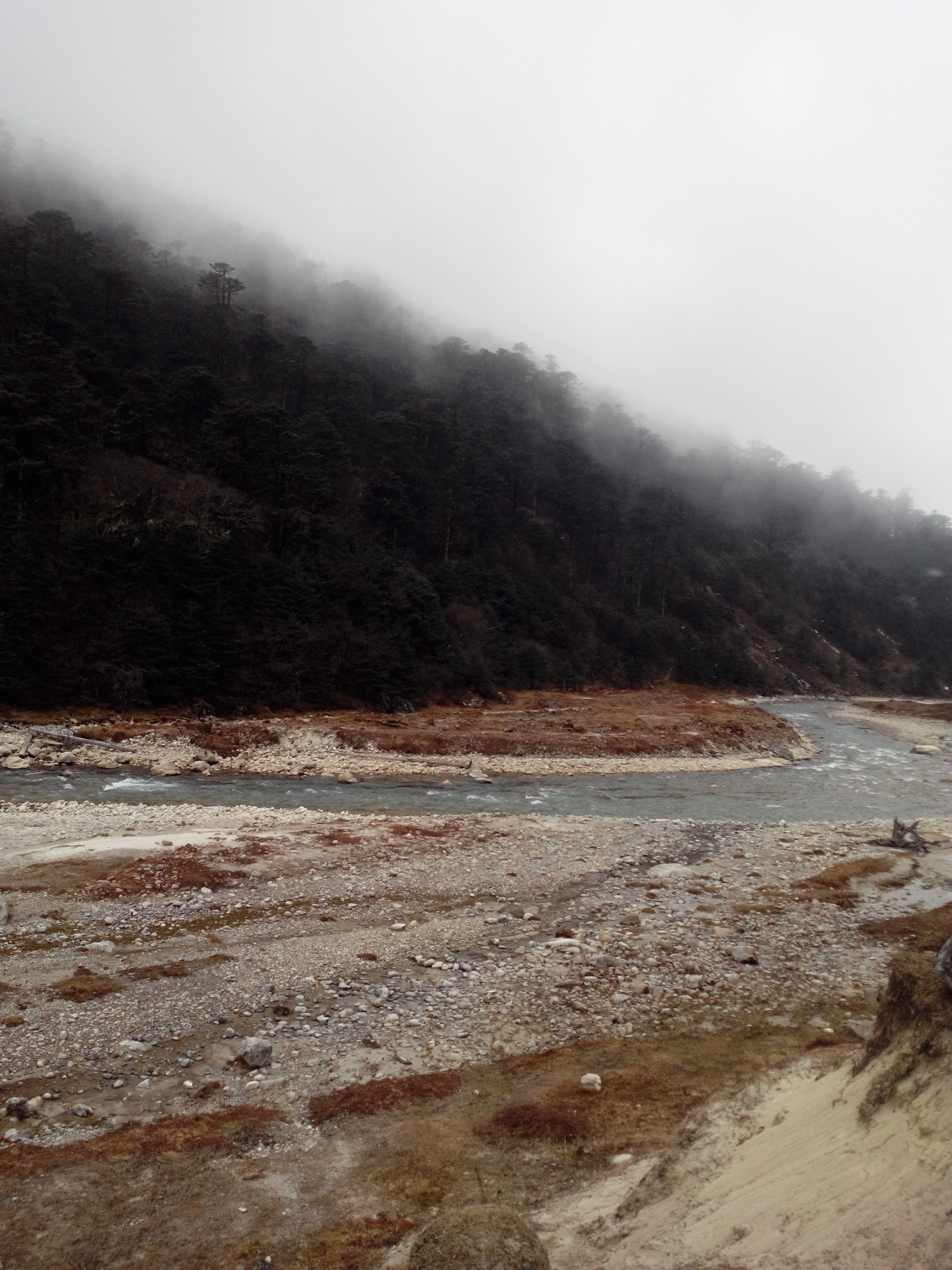
Lachung River North Sikkim

== Bhim Nala Waterfall links ==
- https://www.flickr.com/photos/d-40/5452492981/in/set-72157625947337063
