= Lachung =

- Town & Hill Station
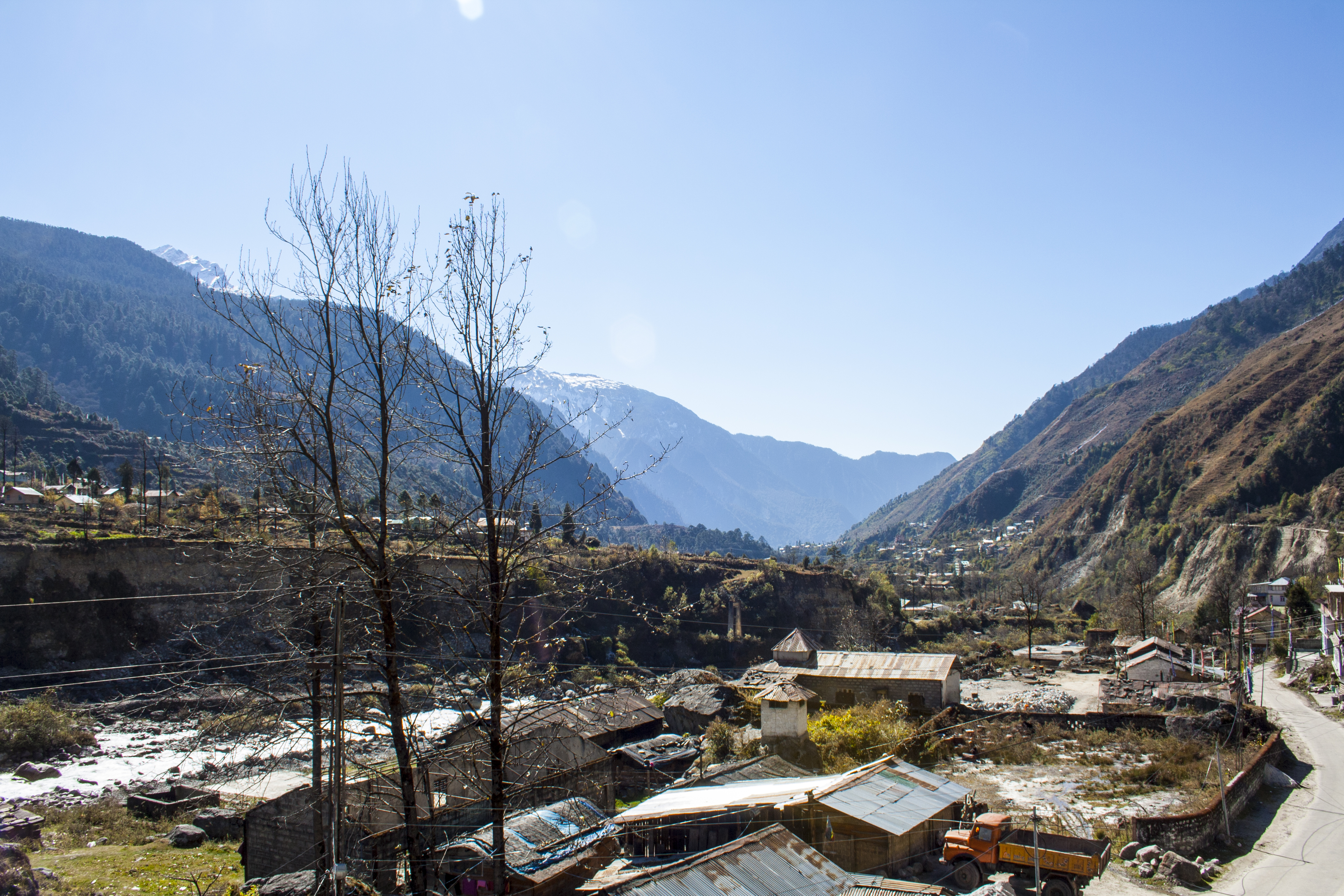
- Lachung town

- Location in Sikkim, India Lachung (India)
- Coordinates: 27.690°N 88.746°E
- Country: India
- State: Sikkim
- District: Mangan
- Elevation: 2,700 m (8,900 ft)

Languages
  - Official: Sikkimese, Nepali, Lepcha, Limbu, Newari, Rai, Gurung, Mangar, Sherpa, Tamang and Sunwar
- Time zone: UTC+5:30 (IST)
- Vehicle registration: SK-03

Lachung is a town and hill station in Mangan district in the Indian state of Sikkim. It is about 50 km from Mangan, the district headquarters. It is near the border with Tibet. Lachung is at an elevation of about 9,600 feet (2,900 m) and at the confluence of the Lachen and Lachung Rivers, both tributaries of the River Teesta. The word Lachung means "small pass". The town is about 125 kilometres (78 mi) from the capital, Gangtok.

The Indian Army has a forward base in the town. Before the Chinese invaded Tibet in 1950, Lachung was a trading post between Sikkim and Tibet. Its economy has been boosted by tourism as it has been opened up by the Indian government. Tourists come from all over the world between October and May, mostly on their way to the Yumthang Valley and the Lachung Monastery. Most of Lachung's inhabitants are of Lepcha and Tibetan descent. Languages spoken there are Nepali, Lepcha, and Bhutia. During winter the town is usually covered in snow. Lachung is also the base camp for the Rhododendron Valley Trek, which starts in Yumthang Valley and ends at Lachen Valley.

British explorer Joseph Dalton Hooker called Lachung the "most picturesque village of Sikkim" in The Himalayan Journal (1855). Skiing is conducted in Phuni nearby.

The valley's climate in autumn presents multicoloured maple and larch leaves. Winter is dry and snowy. Spring begins in late March, when the valley's flowers bloom.

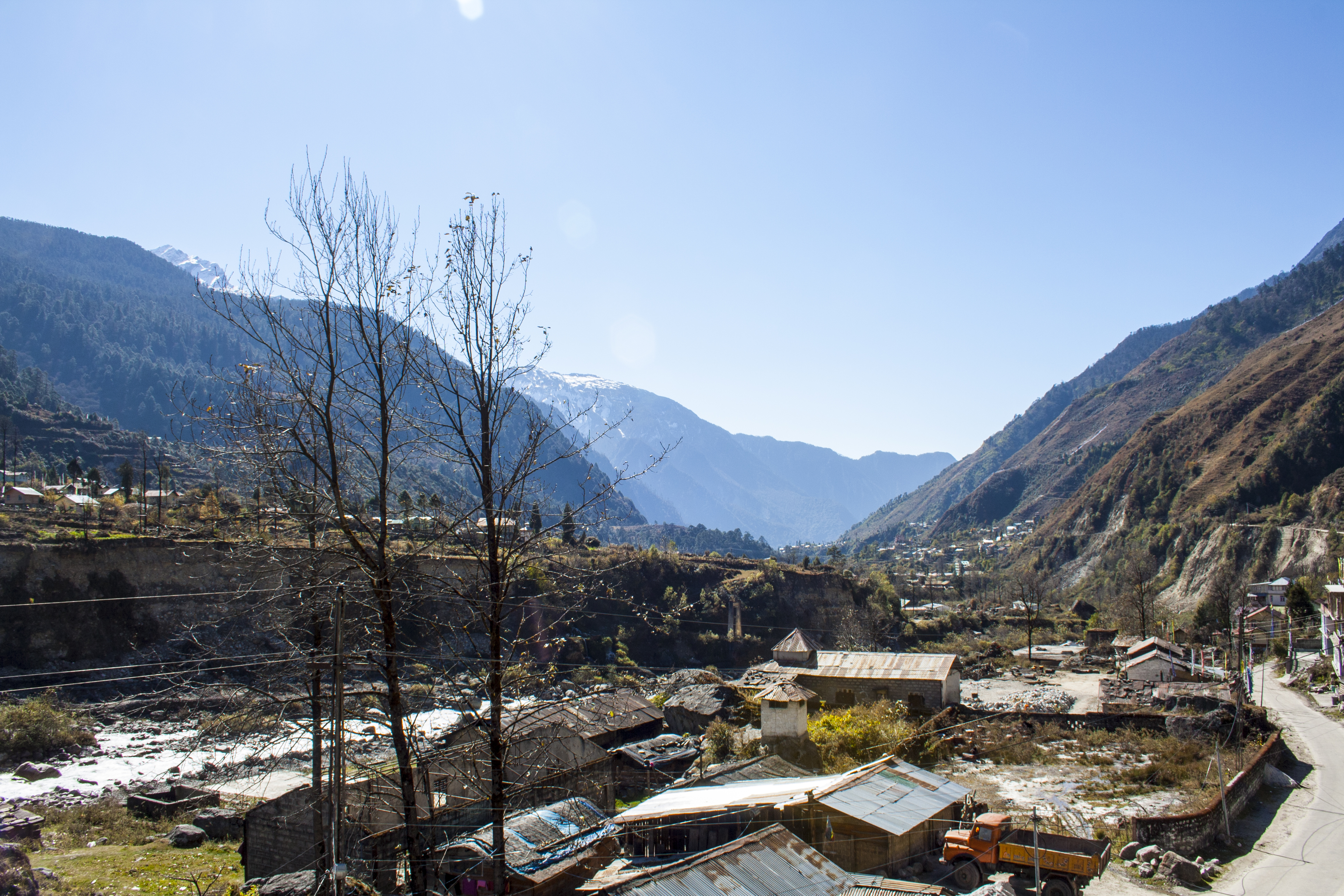
Lachung Town

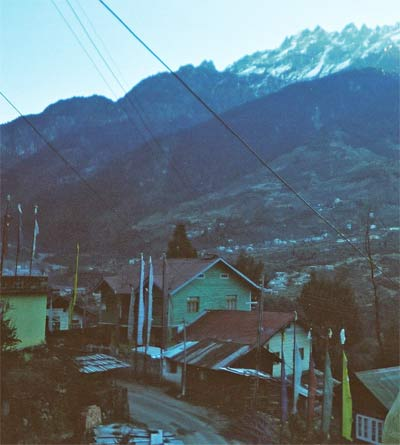
Part of the town

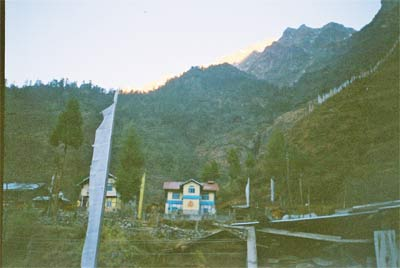
A house in Lachung

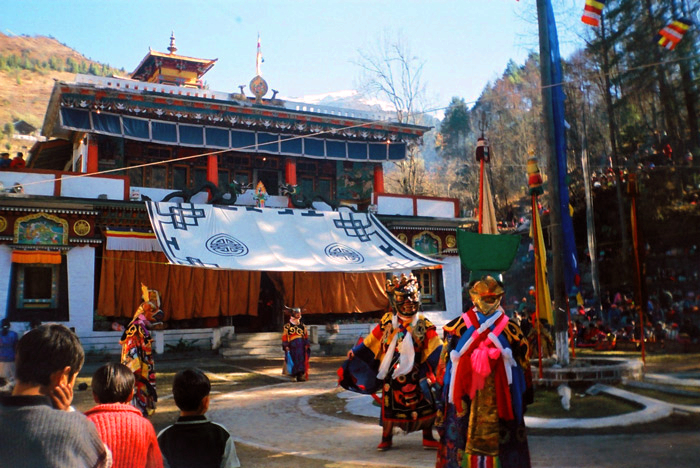
The Lachung Monastery

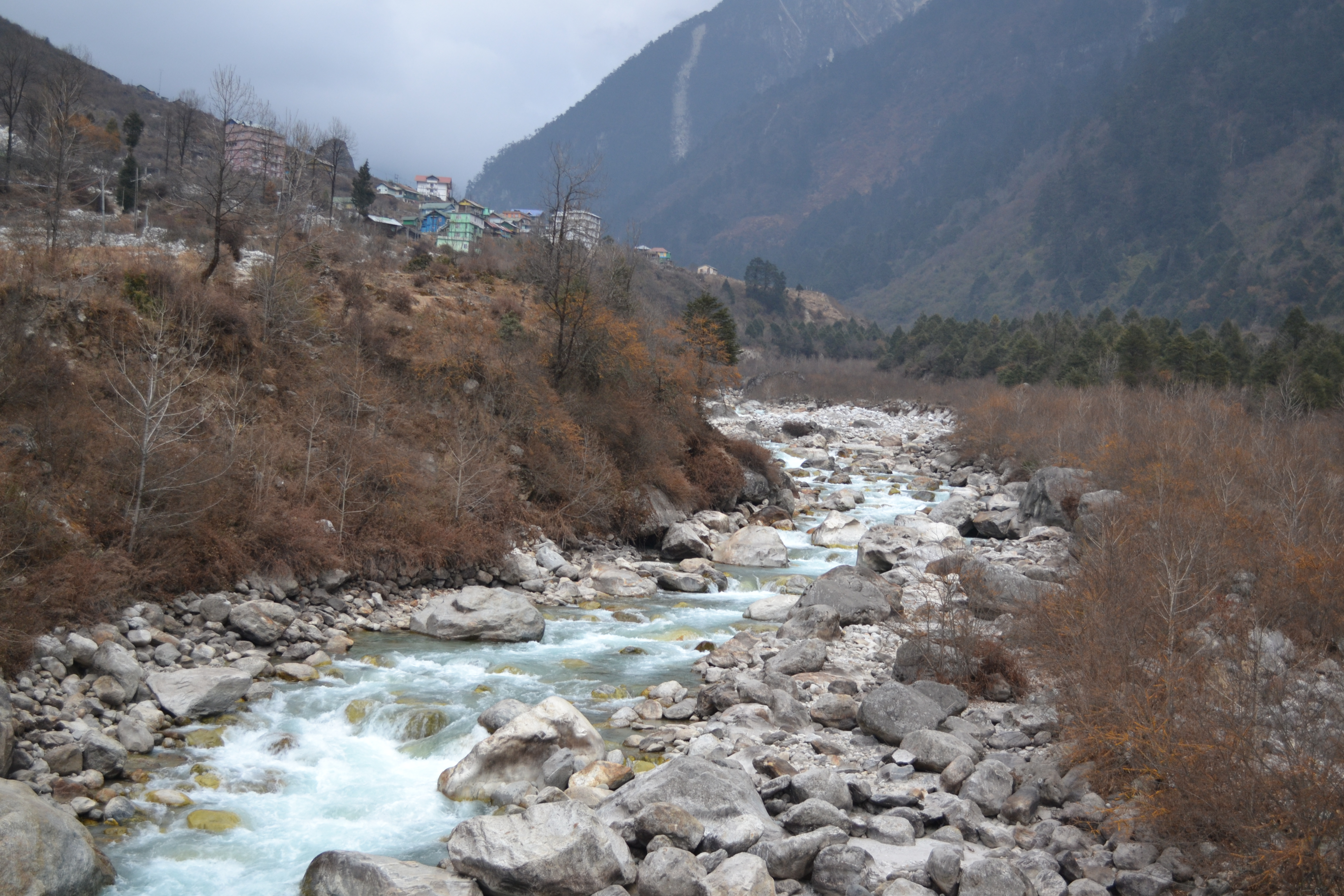
Lachung River

== Climate ==
Climate data for Lachung
Month	Jan	Feb	Mar	Apr	May	Jun	Jul	Aug	Sep	Oct	Nov	Dec	Year
Mean daily maximum °C (°F)	5 (41)	7 (45)	12 (54)	15 (59)	16.5 (61.7)	19.6 (67.3)	20.2 (68.4)	19.9 (67.8)	18.8 (65.8)	16.9 (62.4)	13 (55)	10 (50)	14.5 (58.1)
Mean daily minimum °C (°F)	−10.3 (13.5)	−9.7 (14.5)	−2 (28)	3.1 (37.6)	6.5 (43.7)	10.1 (50.2)	11.6 (52.9)	11.1 (52.0)	9.5 (49.1)	4 (39)	−1.1 (30.0)	−6 (21)	2.2 (36.0)
Average precipitation mm (inches)	15 (0.6)	34 (1.3)	57 (2.2)	83 (3.3)	104 (4.1)	168 (6.6)	219 (8.6)	185 (7.3)	146 (5.7)	61 (2.4)	17 (0.7)	6 (0.2)	1,095 (43)
Source: https://en.climate-data.org/asia/india/sikkim/lachung-633509/

== Banking Facilities in Lachung ==
The State Bank of India is operates a branch in Lachung.

- State Bank Of India, Lachung
