= Yumthang Valley of Flowers =

Nature sanctuary in North Sikkim, India

Yumthang Valley of Flowers sanctuary Sikkim Valley of Flowers Sanctuary
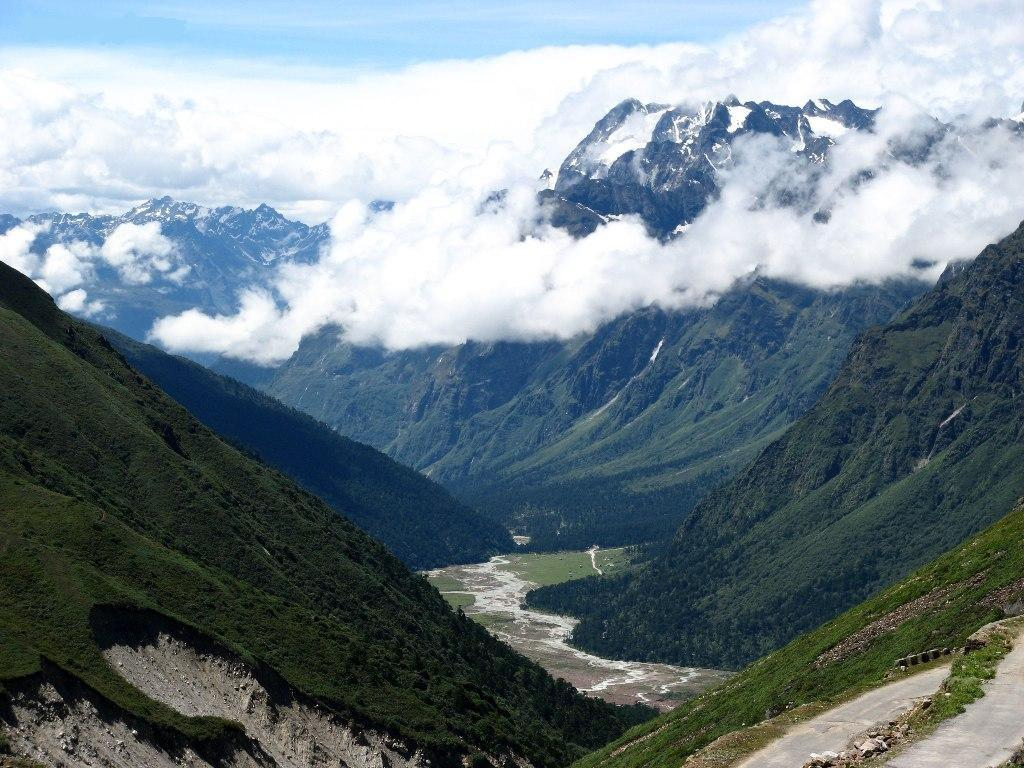
- View of Yumthang Valley of Flowers Sanctuary
- Nickname: Sikkim Valley of Flowers Sanctuary
- Location in Sikkim, India Yumthang Valley of Flowers sanctuary (India)
- Coordinates: 27.8268°N 88.6959°E
- Country: India
- State: Sikkim
- District: Mangan
- Elevation: 3,700 m (12,100 ft)

Languages
  - Official: Sikkimese, Hindi, English
- Time zone: UTC+5:30 (IST)
- Vehicle registration: SK

The Yumthang Valley or Sikkim Valley of Flowers sanctuary, is a nature sanctuary with river, hot springs, yaks and grazing pasture on rolling meadows surrounded by the Himalayan mountains in Yumthang in the Mangan district of Sikkim state in India. It is approx. 75 kilometres (47 mi) from Mangan town, the district headquarters. It is at an elevation of 3,564 metres (11,693 ft) above msl at a distance of 150 kilometres (93 mi) from the state capital Gangtok.

== Climate ==
Climate data for Yumthang
Month	Jan	Feb	Mar	Apr	May	Jun	Jul	Aug	Sep	Oct	Nov	Dec	Year
Mean daily maximum °C (°F)	−3 (27)	1 (34)	4 (39)	7 (45)	9 (48)	12 (54)	14 (57)	15 (59)	13 (55)	10 (50)	7 (45)	3 (37)	8 (46)
Mean daily minimum °C (°F)	−20.3 (−4.5)	−16 (3)	−10 (14)	−5 (23)	2 (36)	7 (45)	9 (48)	10 (50)	7 (45)	2 (36)	−2 (28)	−17 (1)	−2.8 (27.0)
Average precipitation mm (inches)	15 (0.6)	34 (1.3)	57 (2.2)	83 (3.3)	95 (3.7)	129 (5.1)	170 (6.7)	130 (5.1)	125 (4.9)	50 (2.0)	29 (1.1)	10 (0.4)	927 (36.4)
Source: https://en.climate-data.org/asia/india/sikkim/lachung-633509/

It is popularly known as 'Valley of Flowers' and is home to the Shingba Rhododendron Sanctuary, which has over twenty-four species of the rhododendron, the state flower. The flowering season is from late February and to mid June, when countless flowers bloom to carpet the valley in multicolored hues of rainbow. A tributary of the river Teesta flows past the valley and the town of Lachung, the nearest inhabited centre. Yumthang is closed between December and March due to heavy snowfall. There is also a hot spring in the valley.

A forest rest house is the only permanent residence in the valley. During the spring months, the area blooms with rhododendrons, primulas, poppies, iris and other flora. During the summer months, villagers take their cattle to these heights to graze (a practice known as yaylag pastoralism). In view of increasing number of tourists, there is possibility of environmental degradation in near future. Skiing is conducted in the valley.

== Transportation by road ==
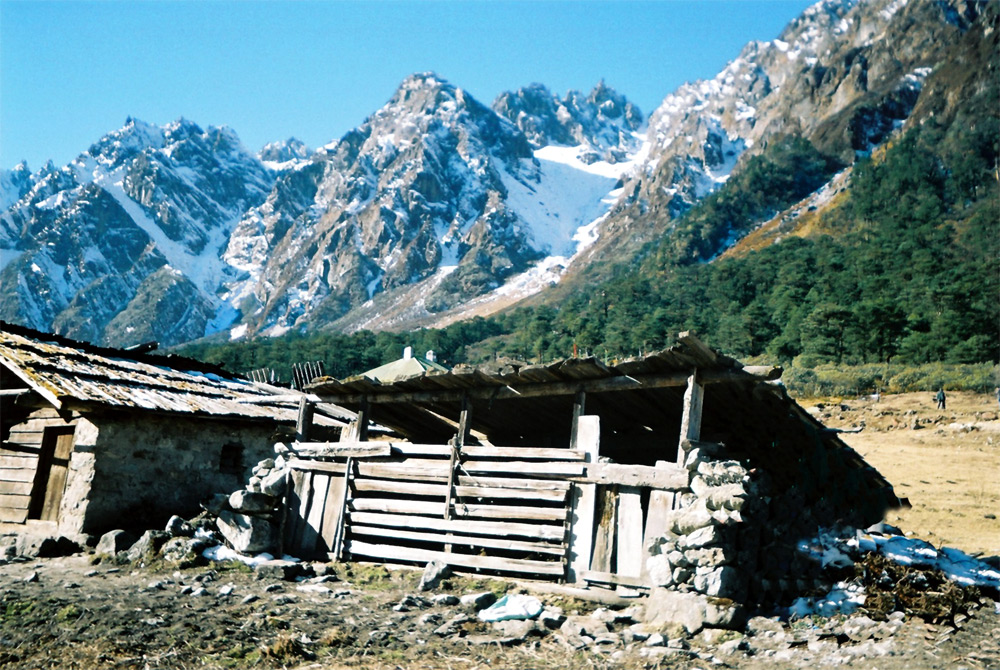
The rugged Himalayan range at Yumthang

Tourists may travel from Gangtok to Lachung (the nearest village where accommodation is available) by booking a full vehicle or shared one and stay over night. A direct journey to Yumthang is not feasible as roads are commonly foggy and it becomes dark very early around 5:30 pm. A trip to the Valley takes around two hours from Lachung, which is about 125 kilometres (78 mi) from Gangtok.

== Gallery ==
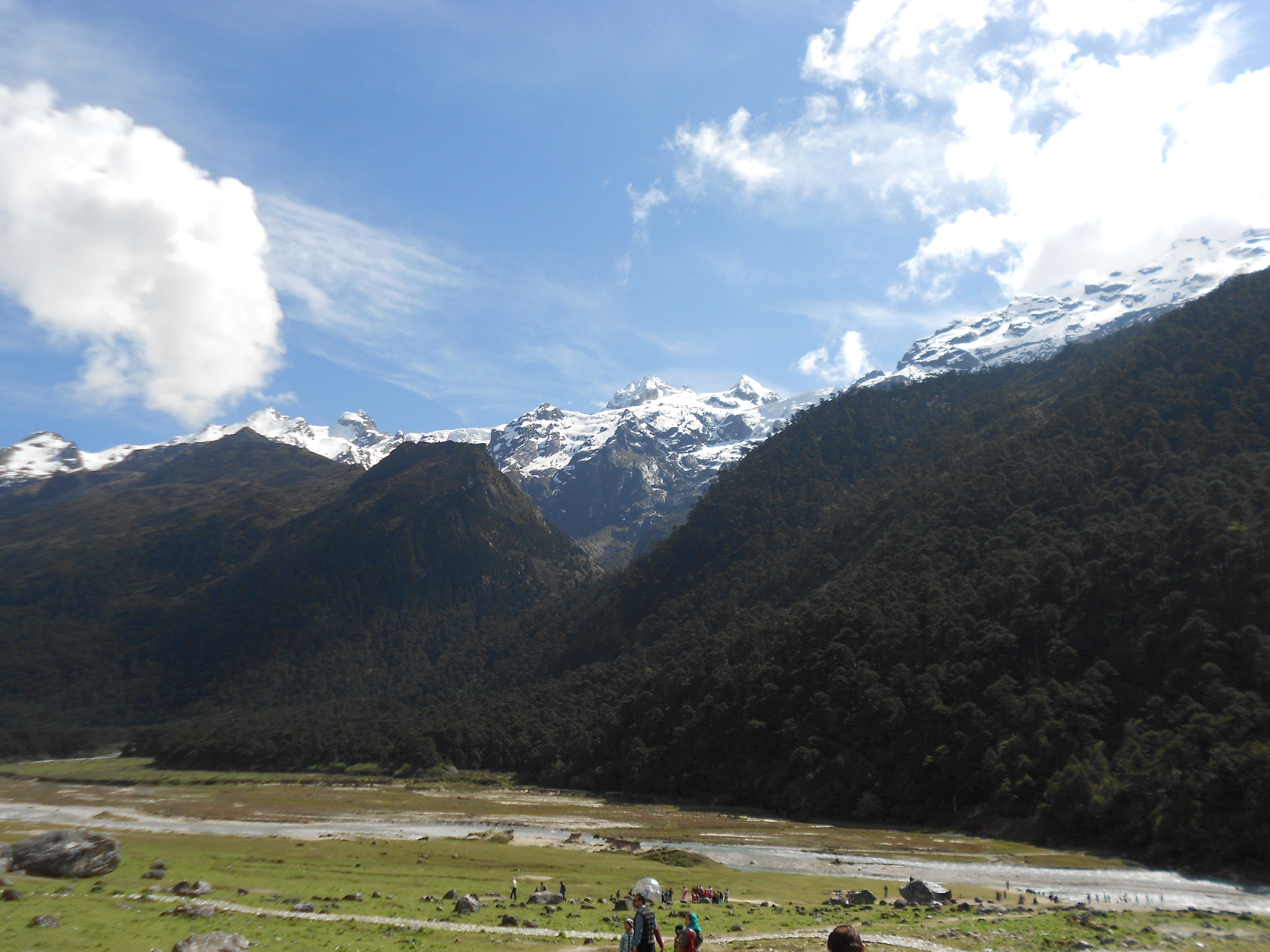
Yumthang valley, Lachung Sikkim

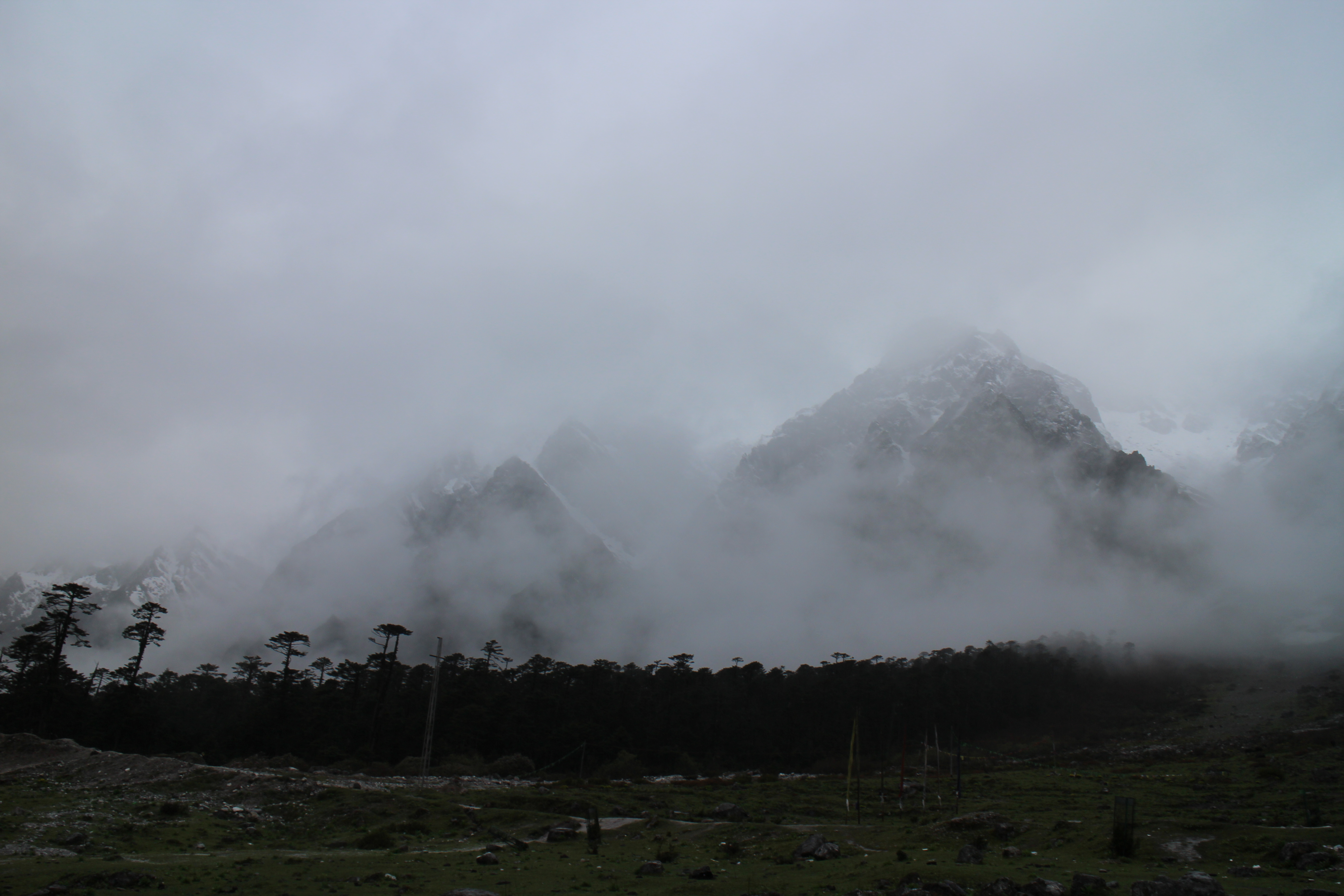
Yumthang valley

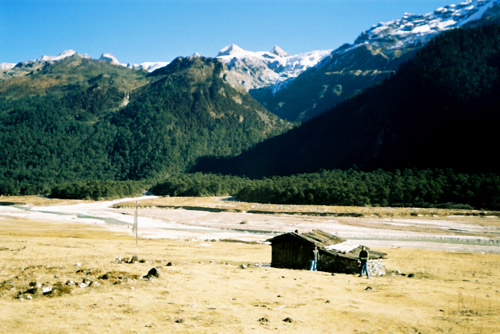
Yumthang

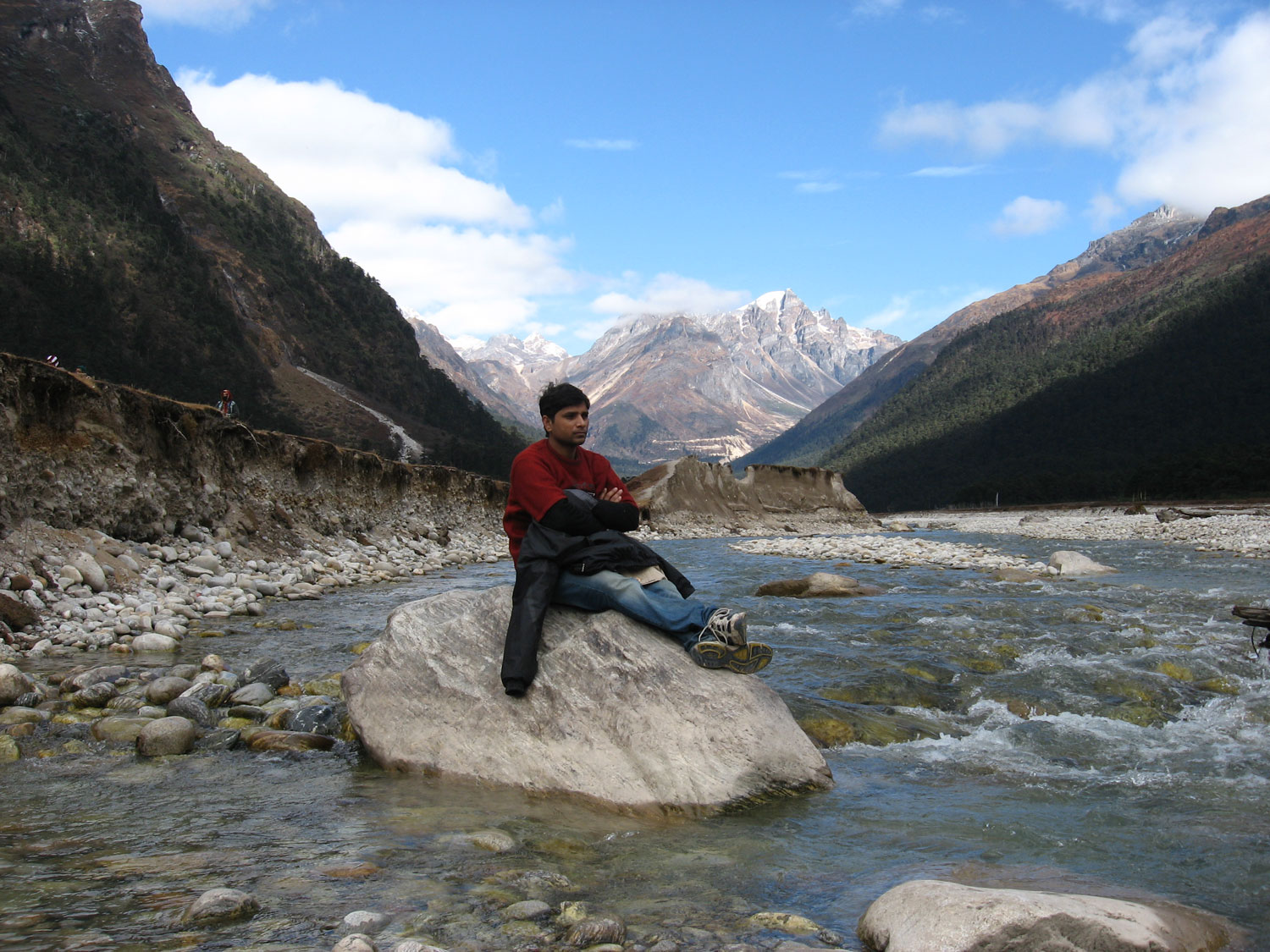
North of Yumthang and the river

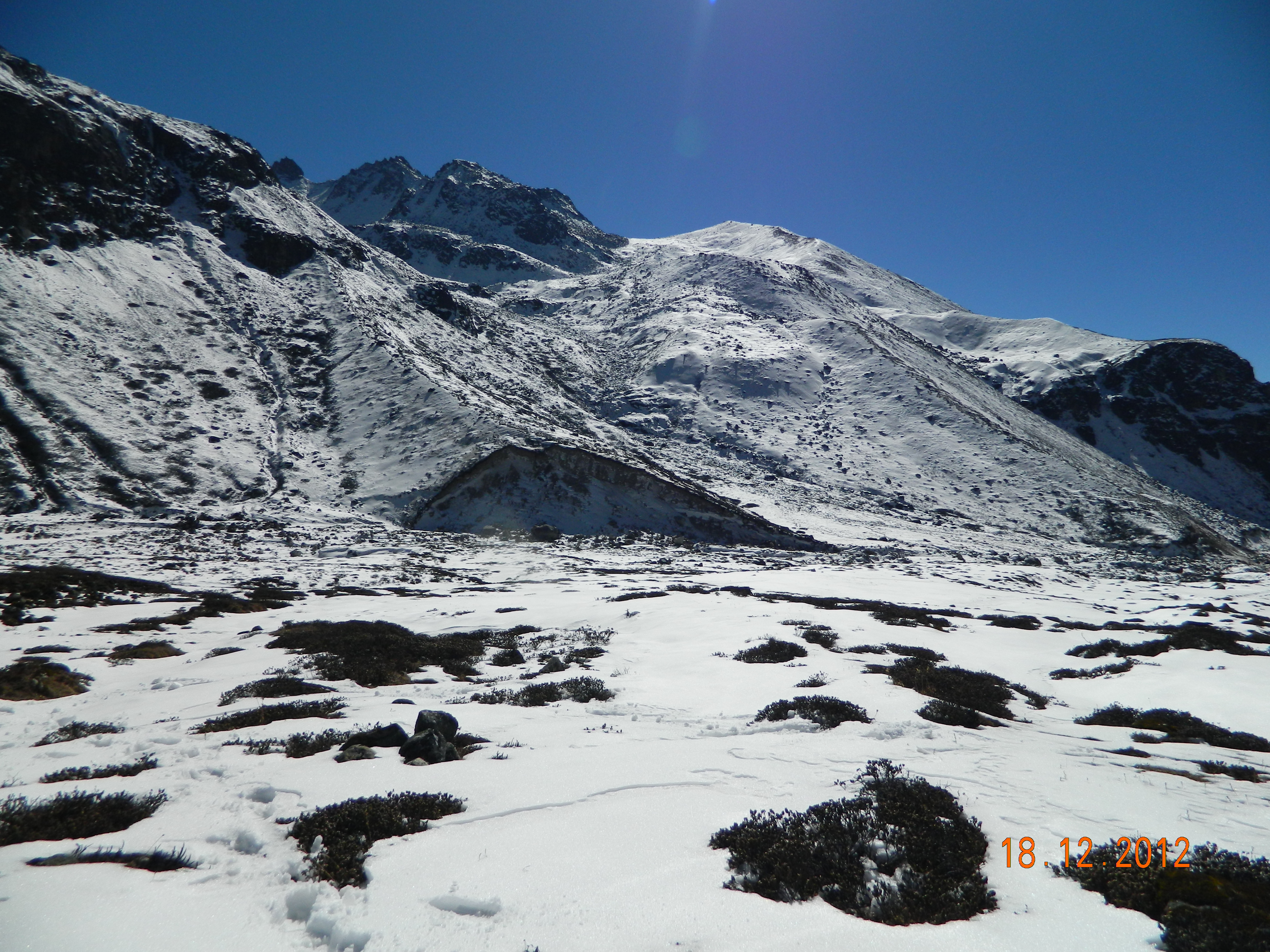
Yamthan valley covered with snow

== See also ==
- Valley of Flowers National Park in Uttarakhand
