= Lachen River =

Coordinates: 27°37′N 88°39′E

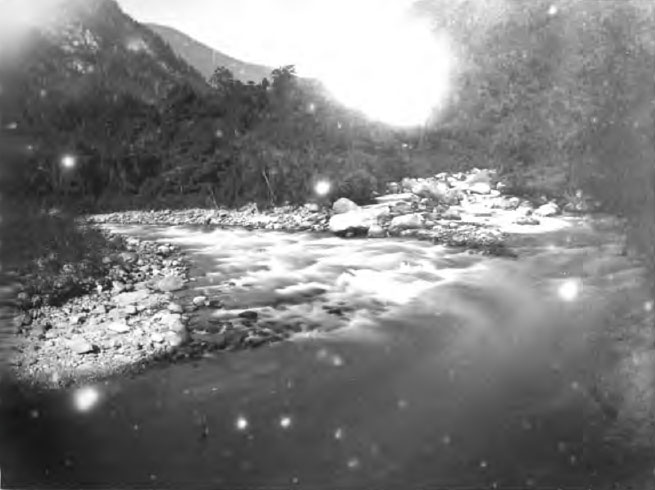

Location
- Country: India

Physical characteristics
- Source: Himalayas
  - location: Himalayas, Sikkim, India
- Mouth: Teesta River
  - location: Mangan district, Sikkim, India

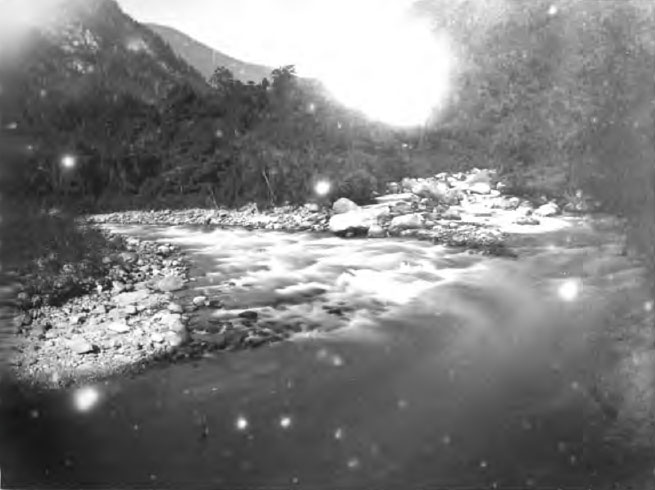
Confluence of the Lachen and Lachung Rivers c. 1885

The Lachen River is a tributary of the Teesta River in the state of Sikkim, India. It is one of the two main tributaries of the Teesta along with the Lachung River, which rise on opposite sides of the Donga Range in neighbouring Bhutan and converge in Chungthang in the North Sikkim district.
