= Jateswar =

- Census Town
- Location in West Bengal, India Jateswar (India)
- Coordinates: 26.6146°N 89.1435°E
- Country: India
- State: West Bengal
- District: Alipurduar

Area
  - Total: 4.2881 km^{2} (1.6556 sq mi)

Population (2011)
  - Total: 8,963
  - Density: 2,090/km^{2} (5,414/sq mi)
- Time zone: UTC+5:30 (IST)
- PIN: 735216
- Telephone/STD code: 03563
- Vehicle registration: WB
- Lok Sabha constituency: Alipurduars
- Vidhan Sabha constituency: Falakata
- Website: alipurduar.gov.in

Jateswar (also spelled Jateshwar) is a census town and a gram panchayat in the Falakata CD block in the Alipurduar subdivision of the Alipurduar district in the state of West Bengal, India.

== Geography ==
Places and tea estates in the western portion of Alipurdar subdivision (including Madarihat-Birpara, Falakata and Alipuduar I CD blocks) in Alipurduar district
CT: census town, R: rural/ urban centre, N: neighbourhood, NP: national park/ wildlife sanctuary, TE: tea estate
Abbreviations used in names – TG for Tea Garden (town/village), TE for Tea Estate
Owing to space constraints in the small map, the actual locations in a larger map may vary slightly

=== Location ===
Jateswar is located at 26.6146°N 89.1435°E.

=== Area overview ===
Alipurduar district is covered by two maps. It is an extensive area in the eastern end of the Dooars in West Bengal. It is undulating country, largely forested, with numerous rivers flowing down from the outer ranges of the Himalayas in Bhutan. It is a predominantly rural area with 79.38% of the population living in the rural areas. The district has 1 municipal town and 20 census towns and that means that 20.62% of the population lives in urban areas. The scheduled castes and scheduled tribes, taken together, form more than half the population in all the six community development blocks in the district. There is a high concentration of tribal people (scheduled tribes) in the three northern blocks of the district.

Note: The map alongside presents some of the notable locations in the subdivision. All places marked in the map are linked in the larger full screen map.

== Demographics ==
As per the 2011 Census of India, Jateshwar had a total population of 8,963. There were 4,633 (52%) males and 4,330 (48%) females. There were 929 persons in the age range of 0 to 6 years. The total number of literate people in Jateshwar was 6,742 (83.92% of the population over 6 years).

== Infrastructure ==
According to the District Census Handbook 2011, Jalpaiguri, Jateswar covered an area of 4.2881 km^{2}. Among the civic amenities, it had 10 km roads, with open drains, the protected water supply involved overhead tanks. It had 1,350 domestic electric connections, 150 road lighting points. Among the medical facilities it had 1 family welfare centre, 1 maternity and child welfare centre, 12 medicine shops. Among the educational facilities it had 5 primary schools, 2 middle schools, 2 secondary schools, 2 senior secondary schools, the nearest general degree college at Falakata 10 km away. It had 5 recognised shorthand, typewriting and vocational training centres. Among the social, recreational and cultural facilities, it had 1 cinema theatre, 1 auditorium/ community hall, 1 public library, 1 reading room. Three important commodities it produced were: wooden furniture, chira, flour.

== Education ==
Lilabati Mahavidyalaya was established at Jateshwar in 2013. Affiliated with the University of North Bengal, it offers courses in arts.

== Healthcare ==
There is a primary health centre, with 6 beds, at Jateswar
