= Sisha Jumrha =

Sishujhumra
- Census Town
- Location in West Bengal, India Sishujhumra (India)
- Coordinates: 26.7166°N 89.0775°E
- Country: India
- State: West Bengal
- District: Alipurduar

Area
  - Total: 4.2654 km^{2} (1.6469 sq mi)

Population (2011)
  - Total: 4,130
  - Density: 968/km^{2} (2,510/sq mi)
- Time zone: UTC+5:30 (IST)
- PIN: 735213
- Telephone/STD code: 03561
- Vehicle registration: WB
- Lok Sabha constituency: Alipurduars
- Vidhan Sabha constituency: Madarihat
- Website: alipurduar.gov.in

Sishujhumra is a census town in the Madarihat-Birpara CD block in the Alipurduar subdivision of the Alipurduar district in the state of West Bengal, India.

== Geography ==
Places and tea estates in the western portion of Alipurdar subdivision (including Madarihat-Birpara, Falakata and Alipuduar I CD blocks) in Alipurduar district
CT: census town, R: rural/ urban centre, N: neighbourhood, NP: national park/ wildlife sanctuary, TE: tea estate
Abbreviations used in names – TG for Tea Garden (town/village), TE for Tea Estate
Owing to space constraints in the small map, the actual locations in a larger map may vary slightly

=== Location ===
Sishujhumra is located at 26.7166°N 89.0775°E.

=== Area overview ===
Alipurduar district is covered by two maps. It is an extensive area in the eastern end of the Dooars in West Bengal. It is undulating country, largely forested, with numerous rivers flowing down from the outer ranges of the Himalayas in Bhutan. The area is predominantly rural, with 79.38% of the population living in the rural areas. The district has 1 municipal town and 20 census towns; 20.62% of the district population lives in urban areas. The scheduled castes and scheduled tribes, taken together, form more than half the population in all the six community development blocks in the district. There is a high concentration of tribal people (scheduled tribes) in the three northern blocks of the district.

Note: The map alongside presents some of the notable locations in the subdivision. All places marked in the map are linked in the larger full screen map.

== Demographics ==
As per the 2011 Census of India, Sishujhumra had a total population of 4,130. There were 2,116 (51%) males and 2,014 (49%) females. There were 537 persons in the age range of 0 to 6 years. The total number of literate people in Sisha Jumrha was 2,631 (73.23% of the population over 6 years).

== Infrastructure ==
According to the District Census Handbook 2011, Jalpaiguri, Sishujhumra covered an area of 4.2654 km^{2}. Among the civic amenities, the protected water supply involved tap water from treated sources, tube well, bore well. It had 400 domestic electric connections, 1 road lighting point. Among the medical facilities it had 1 dispensary/ health centre, 1 charitable hospital/ nursing home, 1 medicine shop. Among the educational facilities it had 1 primary school, 1 middle school, the nearest secondary school at Dim Dim, the nearest senior secondary school, the nearest general degree college at Birpara 8 km away. It had 2 recognised shorthand, typewriting and vocational training institutions, 3 non-formal education centres (Sarva Siksha Abhiyan), 1 special school for disabled. Two important commodities it manufactured were paddy, furniture. It had offices of 1 nationalised bank, 1 private commercial bank, 1 non-agricultural credit society.

== Healthcare ==
There is a primary health centre, with 6 beds, at Sishujhumra.
