= Jagijhora Barabak =

- Census Town
- Location in West Bengal, India Jagijhora Barabak (India)
- Coordinates: 26.6986°N 89.0825°E
- Country: India
- State: West Bengal
- District: Alipurduar

Area
  - Total: 5.1991 km^{2} (2.0074 sq mi)

Population (2011)
  - Total: 6,474
  - Density: 1,245/km^{2} (3,225/sq mi)
- Time zone: UTC+5:30 (IST)
- PIN: 735204
- Telephone/STD code: 03563
- Vehicle registration: WB
- Lok Sabha constituency: Alipurduars
- Vidhan Sabha constituency: Falakata
- Website: alipurduar.gov.in

Jugijhora Barobak is a census town in the Falakata CD block in the Alipurduar subdivision of the Alipurduar district in the state of West Bengal, India.

== Geography ==
Places and tea estates in the western portion of Alipurdar subdivision (including Madarihat-Birpara, Falakata and Alipuduar I CD blocks) in Alipurduar district
CT: census town, R: rural/ urban centre, N: neighbourhood, NP: national park/ wildlife sanctuary, TE: tea estate
Abbreviations used in names – TG for Tea Garden (town/village), TE for Tea Estate
Owing to space constraints in the small map, the actual locations in a larger map may vary slightly

=== Location ===
Jagijhora Barabak is located at 26.6986°N 89.0825°E.

=== Area overview ===
Alipurduar district is covered by two maps. It is an extensive area in the eastern end of the Dooars in West Bengal. It is undulating country, largely forested, with numerous rivers flowing down from the outer ranges of the Himalayas in Bhutan. It is a predominantly rural area with 79.38% of the population living in rural areas. The district has 1 municipal town and 20 census towns. The scheduled castes and scheduled tribes, taken together, form more than half the population in all the six community development blocks in the district. There is a high concentration of tribal people (scheduled tribes) in the three northern blocks of the district.

Note: The map alongside presents some of the notable locations in the subdivision. All places marked in the map are linked in the larger full screen map.

== Demographics ==
As per the 2011 Census of India, Jagijhora Barabak had a total population of 6,474. There were 3,350 (52%) males and 3,124 (48%) females. There were 908 persons in the age range of 0 to 6 years. The total number of literate people in Jagijhora Barabak was 3,954 (71.04% of the population over 6 years).

== Infrastructure ==
According to the District Census Handbook 2011, Jalpaiguri, Jagijhora Barabak covered an area of 5.1991 km^{2}. Among the civic amenities, it had 30 km roads, the protected water supply involved hand pumps. It had 456 domestic electric connections, 16 road lighting points. Among the medical facilities it had 6 medicine shops. Among the educational facilities it had 8 primary schools, 1 middle school, the nearest secondary school at Narsinpur 3 km away, the nearest senior secondary school at Birpara 8 km away. It had 1 non-formal education centre (Sarva Siksha Abhiyan). Three important commodities it produced were: bricks, crushed stone and dolomite. It had the branch of a nationalised bank.
