= Madarihat =

Madarihat Uttar Madarihat
- Census Town
- Location in West Bengal, India Madarihat (India)
- Coordinates: 26.7000°N 89.2833°E
- Country: India
- State: West Bengal
- District: Alipurduar district
- Talukas: Alipurduar subdivision

Area
  - Total: 4.2941 km^{2} (1.6580 sq mi)

Population
  - Total: 9,631
  - Density: 2,243/km^{2} (5,809/sq mi)
- Time zone: UTC+5:30 (IST)
- PIN: 735220
- Telephone/STD code: 03561
- ISO 3166 code: IN-WB
- Lok Sabha constituency: Alipurduars (ST)
- Vidhan Sabha constituency: Madarihat (ST)
- Website: alipurduar.gov.in

Madarihat (Bengali pronunciation: [mad̪aɾihaʈ]; also referred to as Uttar Madarihat) is a census town and a gram panchayat in the Madarihat-Birpara CD block in the Alipurduar subdivision of the Alipurduar district, West Bengal, India. This town is situated on the outskirts of Jaldapara National Park, which is famous for being home of Indian rhinoceros. This is one of the main tourist spots in North Bengal, surrounded by tea gardens, forests, hills, and small rivers, and also having highly diverse population. Madarihat is also world famous for the local wooden furniture.

== Geography ==
Places and tea estates in the western portion of Alipurdar subdivision (including Madarihat-Birpara, Falakata and Alipuduar I CD blocks) in Alipurduar district
CT: census town, R: rural/ urban centre, N: neighbourhood, NP: national park/ wildlife sanctuary, TE: tea estate
Abbreviations used in names – TG for Tea Garden (town/village), TE for Tea Estate
Owing to space constraints in the small map, the actual locations in a larger map may vary slightly

=== Locations ===
Madarihat is located at 26.7000°N 89.2833°E.

=== Area overview ===
Alipurduar district is covered by two maps. It is an extensive area in the eastern end of the Dooars in West Bengal. It is undulating country, largely forested, with numerous rivers flowing down from the outer ranges of the Himalayas in Bhutan. It is a predominantly rural area with 79.38% of the population living in the rural areas. The district has 1 municipal town and 20 census towns and that means that 20.62% of the population lives in urban areas. The scheduled castes and scheduled tribes, taken together, form more than half the population in all the six community development blocks in the district. There is a high concentration of tribal people (scheduled tribes) in the three northern blocks of the district.

Note: The map alongside presents some of the notable locations in the subdivision. All places marked in the map are linked in the larger full screen map.

== Civic administration ==
=== Police station ===
Madarihat police has jurisdiction over a part of Madarihat-Birpara CD block.

=== CD block HQ ===
Headquarters of Madarihat-Birpara CD block is at Madarihat.

== Demographics ==
As per the 2011 Census of India, Uttar Madarihat had a total population of 9,631. There were 4,889 (51%) males and 4,742 (49%) females. There were 1,025 persons in the age range of 0 to 6 years. The total number of literate people in Uttar Madarihat was 7,107 (82.58% of the population over 6 years).

== Infrastructure ==
According to the District Census Handbook 2011, Jalpaiguri, Uttar Madarihat covered an area of 4.2941 km^{2}. Among the civic amenities, the protected water supply involved tap water from treated sources, tube well, bore well. It had 1,100 domestic electric connections, 1 road lighting point. Among the medical facilities it had 1 dispensary/ health centre, 1 charitable hospital/ nursing home, 1 medicine shop. Among the educational facilities it had 1 primary school, 1 middle school, 1 secondary school, 1 senior secondary school, the nearest general degree college at Birpara 16 km away. It had 3 non-formal education centres (Sarva Siksha Abhiyan). Two important commodities it manufactured were paddy, furniture . It had offices of 1 nationalised bank, 1 private commercial bank, 1 non-agricultural credit society.

== Transport ==
The local train station, Madarihat Railway Station, is connected by the newly converted broad gauge New Jalpaiguri-Alipurduar-Samuktala Road Line. The train line leads through the forests and tea gardens of North Bengal. This train line is also connected to the major cities of India like Delhi, Kolkata, Ranchi and Patna. However, the important stations are Birpara and Hasimara, both of which are 20 km away, New Alipurduar (50 km away), New Cooch Behar (80 km), and New Jalpaiguri (140 km). Bagdogra Airport is the nearest airport.(140 km). It is located on the NH 31 (Siliguri-Hasimara) and is connected with Siliguri and other places in North Bengal. North Bengal State Transport Corporation buses, Bhutan Government buses, and minibuses are available from Siliguri to Alipurduar via Madarihat. Private cars can be hired at Siliguri.
