= Madarihat-Birpara (community development block) =

- Community development block
- Interactive map of Madarihat-Birpara
- Coordinates: 26.700°N 89.283°E
- Country: India
- State: West Bengal
- District: Alipurduar

Area
  - Total: 376.75 km^{2} (145.46 sq mi)

Population (2011)
  - Total: 202,026
  - Density: 536.23/km^{2} (1,388.8/sq mi)

Languages
  - Official: Bengali, English
- Time zone: UTC+5:30 (IST)
- Lok Sabha constituency: Alipurduars
- Vidhan Sabha constituency: Madarihat
- Website: alipurduar.gov.in

Madarihat-Birpara is a community development block (CD block) that forms an administrative division in the Alipurduar subdivision of the Alipurduar district in the Indian state of West Bengal.

== Geography ==
Madarihat is located at 26°42′00″N 89°16′59″E.

The Madarihat-Birpara CD block lies in the north-western part of the district. The Dadua River flows along the western boundary of the district. It has hilly terrain which is part of the sub-Himalayan ranges.

The Madarihat-Birpara CD block is bounded by the Samtse District of Bhutan on the north, Kalchini CD block on the east, Falakata CD block on the south and Banarhat CD block in Jalpaiguri district on the west.

The Madarihat-Birpara CD block has an area of 376.75 km^{2}. It has 1 panchayat samity, 10 gram panchayats, 139 gram sansads (village councils), 50 mouzas, 48 inhabited villages and 2 census towns. Madarihat and Birpara police stations serve this block. Headquarters of this CD block is at Madarihat.

Gram panchayats of Madarihat-Birpara block/ panchayat samiti are: Bandapani, Birpara I, Birpara II, Hantapara, Khayarbari, Lankapara, Madarihat, Rangali Bazna, Sishujhumra and Totopara Ballalguri.

== Demographics ==
=== Population ===
According to the 2011 Census of India, the Madarihat CD block had a total population of 202,026, of which 188,265 were rural, and 13,761 were urban. There were 101,536 (50%) males and 100,490 (50%) females. There were 24,382 persons in the age range of 0 to 6 years. The Scheduled Castes numbered 28,813 (14.26%) and the Scheduled Tribes numbered 78,314 (38.76%).

According to the 2001 census, Madarihat-Birpara block had a total population of 185,499, out of which 94,315 were males and 91,184 were females. Madarihat-Birpara block registered a population growth of 21.88 per cent during the 1991-2001 decade.

Census towns in the Madarihat-Birpara CD block are (2011 census figures in brackets): Sisha Jumrha (4,130), Uttar Madarihat (9,631) .

Large villages (with 4,000+ population) in the Madarihat-Birpara CD block are (2011 census figures in brackets): Dimdima Tea Garden (7,375), Birpara Tea Garden (42,080), Nangdala Tea Garden (4,929), Bandapani Tea Garden (5,390), Dalmore Tea Garden (8,551), Gopalpur Tea Garden (5,372), Ramjhora Tea Garden (4,612), Lankapara Tea Garden (12,401), Madhya Rangali Bazar (5,427), Dumchipara Tea Garden (7,062), Hantupara Tea Garden (7,336) and Garganda Tea Garden (4,633).

Other villages in the Madarihat-Birpara CD block include (2011 census figures in brackets): Totopara (2,960) and Dheklapara Tea Garden (2,643).

=== Literacy ===
According to the 2011 census, the total number of literate persons in the Madarihat CD block was 120,391 (67.77% of the population over 6 years) out of which males numbered 67,717 (75.92% of the male population over 6 years) and females numbered 52,674 (59.55% of the female population over 6 years). The gender disparity (the difference between female and male literacy rates) was 16.36%.

See also – List of West Bengal districts ranked by literacy rate

Literacy in CD blocks of
Jalpaiguri district
Jalpaiguri Sadar subdivision
Rajganj – 62.82%
Jalpaiguri – 73.81%
Maynaguri – 75.63%
Dhupguri – 60.57%
Malbazar subdivision
Mal – 66.31
Matiali – 66.98%
Nagrakata – 61.27%
Alipurduar subdivision
Madarihat-Birpara – 67.77%
Kalchini – 68.96%
Kumargram – 72.42%
Alipurduar I – 78.19%
Alipurduar II – 75.76%
Falakata – 72.64%
2011 Census: CD Block Wise

Primary Census Abstract Data

=== Language and religion ===
Religion in Madarihat-Birpara CD block (2011)
Hinduism	72.73%
Islam	10.91%
Christianity	7.83%
Buddhism	5.60%
Tribal religion	2.71%
Other or not stated	0.22%

In the 2011 Census of India, Hindus numbered 146,924 and formed 72.73% of the population of Madarihat-Birpara CD block. Muslims numbered 22,049 and formed 10.91% of the population. Christians numbered 15,811 and formed 7.83% of the population. Buddhists numbered 11,322 and formed 5.60% of the population. Others numbered 21,731 and formed 10.76% of the population. Others include Addi Bassi, Marang Boro, Santal, Saranath, Sari Dharma, Sarna, Alchchi, Bidin, Sant, Saevdharm, Seran, Saran, Sarin, Kheria, and other religious communities.

Languages of Madarihat-Birpara CD block (2011)
1. Sadri (31.1%)
2. Nepali (25.0%)
3. Bengali (23.2%)
4. Hindi (4.73%)
5. Kurukh (2.54%)
6. Bhojpuri (2.39%)
7. Rajbongshi (2.32%)
8. Boro (1.96%)
9. Mundari (1.12%)
10. 'Other' Bengali (0.95%)
11. Others (4.73%)

At the time of the 2011 census, 31.09% of the population spoke Sadri, 24.99% Nepali, 23.18% Bengali, 4.73% Hindi, 2.54% Kurukh, 2.39% Bhojpuri, 2.32% Rajbongshi, 1.96% Boro and 1.12% Mundari as their first language. 0.95% of the population were recorded as speaking 'Others' under Bengali.

== Poverty level ==
Based on a study of the per capita consumption in rural and urban areas, using central sample data of NSS 55th Round 1999–2000, Jalpaiguri district was found to have relatively high rates of poverty of 35.73% in rural areas and 61.53% in the urban areas. It was one of the few districts where urban poverty rate was higher than the rural poverty rate.

According to a World Bank report, as of 2012, 26-31% of the population of Jalpaiguri, Bankura and Paschim Medinipur districts were below poverty line, a relatively high level of poverty in West Bengal, which had an average 20% of the population below poverty line.

== Economy ==
=== Livelihood ===
Livelihood
in Madarihat-Birpara CD block
1. Cultivators (8.78%)
2. Agricultural labourers (11.9%)
3. Household industries (1.72%)
4. Other Workers (77.6%)

In the Madarihat-Birpara CD block in 2011, among the class of total workers, cultivators numbered 7,171 and formed 8.78%, agricultural labourers numbered 9,174 and formed 11.89%, household industry workers numbered 1,406 and formed 1.72% and other workers numbered 63,378 and formed 77.60%. Total workers numbered 81,669 and formed 40.42% of the total population, and non-workers numbered 120,357 and formed 59.58% of the population.

Note: In the census records a person is considered a cultivator, if the person is engaged in cultivation/ supervision of land owned by self/government/institution. When a person who works on another person's land for wages in cash or kind or share, is regarded as an agricultural labourer. Household industry is defined as an industry conducted by one or more members of the family within the household or village, and one that does not qualify for registration as a factory under the Factories Act. Other workers are persons engaged in some economic activity other than cultivators, agricultural labourers and household workers. It includes factory, mining, plantation, transport and office workers, those engaged in business and commerce, teachers, entertainment artistes and so on.

=== Infrastructure ===
There are 48 inhabited villages in the Madarihat Birpara CD block, as per the District Census Handbook, Jalpaiguri, 2011. 100% villages have power supply. 47 villages (97.92%) have drinking water supply. 21 villages (43.57%) have post offices. 38 villages (79.17%) have telephones (including landlines, public call offices and mobile phones). 13 villages (27.08%) have pucca (paved) approach roads and 25 villages (52.08%) have transport communication (includes bus service, rail facility and navigable waterways). 2 villages (4.17%) have agricultural credit societies and 7 villages (14.58%) have banks.

=== Agriculture ===
The economy of the Jalpaiguri district is mainly dependent on agriculture and plantations, and majority of the people are engaged in agriculture. Jalpaiguri is well known for tea and timber. Other important crops are paddy, jute, tobacco, mustard seeds, sugarcane and wheat. The annual average rainfall is 3,440 mm, around double of that of Kolkata and the surrounding areas. The area is flood prone and the rivers often change course causing immense damage to crops and cultivated lands.

In 2013–14, there were 14 fertiliser depots, 10 seed stores and 45 fair price shops in the Madarihat-Birpara CD block.

In 2013–14, the Madarihat-Birpara CD block produced 23,528 tonnes of Aman paddy, the main winter crop, from 5,663 hectares, 555 tonnes of Boro paddy (spring crop) from 262 hectares, 3,017 tonnes of Aus paddy (summer crop) from 1,267 hectares, 682 tonnes of wheat from 229 hectares, 1,843 tonnes of maize from 817 hectares, 10,224 tonnes of jute from 718 hectares and 26,130 tonnes of potatoes from 1,151 hectares. It also produced pulses and oilseeds.

In 2013–14, the total area irrigated in the Madarihat-Birpara CD block was 3,760 hectares, out of which 2,158 hectares were irrigated by canal water, 52 hectares by tank water, 840 hectares by river lift irrigation, 80 hectares by deep tube wells, 655 hectares by shallow tube wells, 55 hectares by open dug wells.

=== Dooars-Terai tea gardens ===
Tea gardens in the Dooars and Terai regions produce 226 million kg or over a quarter of India's total tea crop.. The Dooars-Terai tea is characterized by a bright, smooth and full-bodied liquor that's a wee bit lighter than Assam tea. Cultivation of tea in the Dooars was primarily pioneered and promoted by the British but there was significant contribution of Indian entrepreneurs.

=== Banking ===
In 2013–14, Madarihat-Birpara CD block had offices of 5 commercial banks and 4 gramin banks.

=== Backward Regions Grant Fund ===
The Jalpaiguri district is listed as a backward region and receives financial support from the Backward Regions Grant Fund. The fund, created by the Government of India, is designed to redress regional imbalances in development. As of 2012, 272 districts across the country were listed under this scheme. The list includes 11 districts of West Bengal.

== Transport ==
Madarihat-Birpara CD block has 7 originating/ terminating bus routes.

NH 317 passes through the block.

== Education ==
In 2013–14, Madarihat-Birpara CD block had 97 primary schools with 12,331 students, 5 middle schools with 1,031 students, 5 high school with 5,790 students and 14 higher secondary schools with 18,394 students. Madarihat-Birpara CD block had 1 general degree college with 2,683 students, 2 technical/ professional institutions with 229 students, 658 institutions for special and non-formal education with 26,752 students.

See also – Education in India

According to the 2011 census, in the Madarihat CD block, among the 48 inhabited villages, all villages had schools, 34 villages had two or more primary schools, 31 villages had at least 1 primary and 1 middle school and 13 villages had at least 1 middle and 1 secondary school.

Birpara College was established at Birpara in 1986. Affiliated with the University of North Bengal, it offers courses in arts and commerce.

== Healthcare ==
In 2014, Madarihat-Birpara CD block had 1 hospital, 1 rural hospital, 3 primary health centres and 3 NGO/ private nursing home with total 198 beds and 27 doctors (excluding private bodies). It had 37 family welfare subcentres. 34,749 patients were treated indoor and 272,906 patients were treated outdoor in the hospitals, health centres and subcentres of the CD block.

Madarihat Rural Hospital, with 30 beds at Madarihat, is the major government medical facility in the Madarihat-Birpara CD block. There are primary health centres at Madhyarangali Bazar (PO Gopal Bagan) (with 10 beds), Sisha Jumrha (PO Sishubarihat) (with 6 beds), Totopara (with 10 beds).
