= Falakata Municipality =

Civic body in West Bengal, India

Type
- Type: Municipality

History
- Founded: 2021; 5 years ago

Leadership
- Chairman: Pradip Kumar Muhuri, AITC
- Vice Chairman: Ruma Ray Sarkar, AITC

Structure
- Seats: 18
- Political groups: Government (18); AITC (18)

Elections
- Last election: 2022
- Next election: 2027

Website
- falakatamunicipality.in

Falakata Municipality is the civic body that governs Falakata town of Falakata CD Block in Alipurduar district, West Bengal, India.

== Current members ==
Falakata Municipality has a total of 18 members or councillors, who are directly elected after a term of 5 years. The council is led by the Chairperson. The latest elections were held on 12 February 2022. The current chairman of Falakata Municipality is Samir Bhandari of the Trinamool Congress. The current vice chairman is Ruma Ray Sarkar of the Trinamool Congress.

Chairperson: Pradip Kumar Muhuri
Deputy Chairperson: Ruma Ray Sarkar
Ward No.	Name of Councillor	Party	Remarks
1	Minu Barman Gope	Trinamool Congress	
2	Shyamali Pal	Trinamool Congress	
3	Rajesh Roy	Trinamool Congress	
4	Ashim Deb	Trinamool Congress	
5	Altaf Hossain	Trinamool Congress	
6	Jayanti Barman	Trinamool Congress	
7	Bhagirath Mandal	Trinamool Congress	
8	Ruma Ray Sarkar	Trinamool Congress	
9	Ratan Sarkar	Trinamool Congress	
10	Pradip Kumar Muhuri	Trinamool Congress	
11	Gita Dutta	Trinamool Congress	
12	Subhash Ghosh	Trinamool Congress	
13	Manoj Saha	Trinamool Congress	
14	Lakshmi Mishra	Trinamool Congress	
15	Abhijit Ray	Trinamool Congress	
16	Achinta Ray	Trinamool Congress	
17	Jayanta Adhikari	Trinamool Congress	
18	Tapas Kumar Guha	Trinamool Congress	

== Elections ==
=== 2022 ===
Falakata Municipality
Party	Won	+/−
Trinamool Congress	18	
Total	18	
