= Mejbil =

- Location in West Bengal, India Mejbil (India)
- Coordinates: 26.5150°N 89.2871°E
- Country: India
- State: West Bengal
- District: Alipurduar
- Named for: Mejbil Thakur

Government
  - Type: Village
  - Body: Purba Kathalbari Gram panchayet

Area
  - Total: 5.517 km^{2} (2.130 sq mi)

Population (2011)
  - Total: 4,169
  - Density: 755.7/km^{2} (1,957/sq mi)
- Demonym: Mejbili

Languages
  - Official: Bengali, English
- Time zone: UTC+5:30 (IST)
- Vehicle registration: WB
- Lok Sabha constituency: Alipurduars (ST)
- Vidhan Sabha constituency: Falakata (SC)
- Website: alipurduar.gov.in

Mejbil is a village located in the Alipurduar district of West Bengal in India. Politically, it is represented by the Alipurduar I constituency. It is situated between the Falakata-Sonapur NH31D highway. Falakata is the nearest town to Mejbil. The administrative works are done at Alipurduar.

== Education ==
There are no higher secondary schools in Mejbil. However, the village has five primary schools and two Shishu Shiksha Kendra (pre-schools).

== Culture ==
Mejbil is a culturally significant area. Bhawaiya in particular is a vibrant form of culture within Mejbil. Rashmela is the largest festival held in Mejbil. In 2019, the festival of Rashmela has completed its 50th anniversary. In addition, Mejbil has a wide variety of folk cultures such as Kushan Jatra, Bishahara, Jatra, et al.

== Sports ==
Football and cricket are the most popular sports in Mejbil. The main playground for these sports is called Mejbil Rashmela Maidan. The two major sports and cultural clubs in Mejbil are called Kranti Sangha and Pally Kalyan Sangha.
