= Alipurduar I =

- Community development block
- Interactive map of Alipurduar I
- Coordinates: 26.5224000°N 89.5435500°E
- Country: India
- State: West Bengal
- District: Alipurduar

Area
  - Total: 378.59 km^{2} (146.17 sq mi)

Population (2011)
  - Total: 216,931
  - Density: 573.00/km^{2} (1,484.1/sq mi)

Languages
  - Official: Bengali, English
- Time zone: UTC+5:30 (IST)
- Lok Sabha constituency: Alipurduars
- Vidhan Sabha constituency: Alipurduars, Falakata
- Website: www.alipurduar.gov.in

Alipurduar I is a community development block (CD block) that forms an administrative division in the Alipurduar subdivision of the Alipurduar district in the Indian state of West Bengal.

== Geography ==
Alipurduar Railway Junction is located at 26°31′21″N 89°32′37″E.

The Alipurduar I CD block lies in the south-central part of the district. The Torsha River flows along the Western boundary. It has hilly terrain which is part of the sub-Himalayan ranges.

Alipurduar I CD block is bounded by Kalchini CD block on the north, Alipurduar II CD block on the east, Cooch Behar II CD block in Cooch Behar district on the south, and Falakata CD block on the west.

The Alipurduar I CD block has an area of 378.59 km^{2}. It has 1 panchayat samity, 11 gram panchayats, 155 gram sansads (village councils), 48 mouzas, 47 inhabited villages and 5 census towns. Alipurduar police station serves this block. Headquarters of this CD block is at Pachkalguri.

Gram panchayats of Alipurduar I block/ panchayat samiti are: Banchukamari, Chakowakheti, Mathura, Parorpar, Patlakhowa, Purba Kathalbari, Shalkumar I, Shalkumar II, Tapsikhatha, Vivekananda I, Vivekananda II.

== Demographics ==
=== Population ===
According to the 2011 Census of India, the Alipurduar I CD block had a total population of 216,931, of which 160,760 were rural, and 56,171 were urban. There were 111,378 (51%) males and 105,553 (49%) females. There were 24,381 persons in the age range of 0 to 6 years. The Scheduled Castes numbered 105,017 (48.41%) and the Scheduled Tribes numbered 36,605 (16.87%).

According to the 2001 census, Alipurduar I block had a total population of 197,160, out of which 101,505 were males and 95,655 were females. Alipurdur I block registered a population growth of 12.59 per cent during the 1991-2001 decade.

Census towns in the Alipurduar I CD block are (2011 census figures in brackets): Paschim Jitpur (14, 334), Chechakhata (7,613), Alipurduar Railway Junction (10,733), Bholar Dabri (12,670), Birpara (10,821).

Large villages (with 4,000+ population) in the Alipurduar I CD block are (2011 census figures in brackets): Mejbil (4,169), Paschim Khatalbari (6,085), Salkumarhat (5,952), Munshipara (6,275), Prodhanpara (4,023), Nutanpara (4,661), Purba Kathlbari (6,830), Silbarihat (5,590), Dakshin Chakoakheti (6.462), Mathura Tea Garden (9,181), Uttar Sonapur (5,632), Pukuritola (5,163), Paitkapara Tea Garden (4,951), Parapar (4,384), Ghagra (5,765) and Bariguri (5,051).

Other villages in the Alipurduar I CD block include (2011 census figures in brackets): Pachkalguri (3,257), Banchukamari (3,724) and Taparikhata (3,803).

=== Literacy ===
According to the 2011 census, the total number of literate persons in the Alipurduar I CD block was 146,702 (76.19% of the population over 6 years) out of which males numbered 81,191 (82.09% of the male population over 6 years) and females numbered 65,511 (69.96% of the female population over 6 years). The gender disparity (the difference between female and male literacy rates) was 12.13%.

See also – List of West Bengal districts ranked by literacy rate

Literacy in CD blocks of
Jalpaiguri district
Jalpaiguri Sadar subdivision
Rajganj – 62.82%
Jalpaiguri – 73.81%
Maynaguri – 75.63%
Dhupguri – 60.57%
Malbazar subdivision
Mal – 66.31
Matiali – 66.98%
Nagrakata – 61.27%
Alipurduar subdivision
Madarihat-Birpara – 67.77%
Kalchini – 68.96%
Kumargram – 72.42%
Alipurduar I – 78.19%
Alipurduar II – 75.76%
Falakata – 72.64%
2011 Census: CD Block Wise

Primary Census Abstract Data

=== Language and religion ===
Religion in Alipurduar I CD block (2011)
Hinduism	90.55%
Islam	5.93%
Christianity	2.54%
Tribal religion	0.74%
Other or not stated	0.24%

In the 2011 Census of India, Hindus numbered 196,437 and formed 90.55% of the population of Alipurduar I CD block. Muslims numbered 12,869 and formed 5.93% of the population. Christians numbered 5,516 and formed 2.54% of the population. Others numbered 2,109 and formed 0.98% of the population. Others include Addi Bassi, Marang Boro, Santal, Saranath, Sari Dharma, Sarna, Alchchi, Bidin, Sant, Saevdharm, Seran, Saran, Sarin, Kheria, and other religious communities.

Languages of Alipurduar I CD block (2011)
1. Bengali (66.3%)
2. Sadri (9.95%)
3. 'Other' Bengali (7.53%)
4. Rajbongshi (4.64%)
5. Hindi (2.73%)
6. Kurukh (2.35%)
7. Boro (1.52%)
8. Nepali (1.15%)
9. Mundari (1.06%)
10. Others (2.75%)

At the time of the 2011 census, 66.32% of the population spoke Bengali, 9.95% Sadri, 4.64% Rajbongshi, 2.73% Hindi, 2.35% Kurukh, 1.52% Boro, 1.15% Nepali and 1.06% Mundari as their first language. 7.53% were recorded as speaking 'Other' under Bengali.

== Poverty level ==
Based on a study of the per capita consumption in rural and urban areas, using central sample data of NSS 55th Round 1999-2000, Jalpaiguri district was found to have relatively high rates of poverty of 35.73% in rural areas and 61.53% in the urban areas. It was one of the few districts where urban poverty rate was higher than the rural poverty rate.

According to a World Bank report, as of 2012, 26-31% of the population of Jalpaiguri, Bankura and Paschim Medinipur districts were below poverty line, a relatively high level of poverty in West Bengal, which had an average 20% of the population below poverty line.

== Economy ==
=== Livelihood ===
Livelihood
in Alipurduar I CD block
1. Cultivators (18.7%)
2. Agricultural labourers (34.4%)
3. Household industries (1.11%)
4. Other Workers (45.8%)

In the Alipurduar I CD block in 2011, among the class of total workers, cultivators numbered 16,670 and formed 18.68%, agricultural labourers numbered 30,686 and formed 34.39%, household industry workers numbered 992 and formed 1.11% and other workers numbered 40,876 and formed 45.81%. Total workers numbered 89,224 and formed 41.43% of the total population, and non-workers numbered 127,707 and formed 58.87% of the population.

Note: In the census records a person is considered a cultivator, if the person is engaged in cultivation/ supervision of land owned by self/government/institution. When a person who works on another person's land for wages in cash or kind or share, is regarded as an agricultural labourer. Household industry is defined as an industry conducted by one or more members of the family within the household or village, and one that does not qualify for registration as a factory under the Factories Act. Other workers are persons engaged in some economic activity other than cultivators, agricultural labourers and household workers. It includes factory, mining, plantation, transport and office workers, those engaged in business and commerce, teachers, entertainment artistes and so on.

=== Infrastructure ===
There are 47 inhabited villages in the Alipurduar I CD block, as per the District Census Handbook, Jalpaiguri, 2011. 100% villages have power supply. 100% villages have drinking water supply. 19 villages (40.43%) have post offices. 46 villages (97.87%) have telephones (including landlines, public call offices and mobile phones). 24 villages (51.06%) have pucca (paved) approach roads and 22 villages (46.81%) have transport communication (includes bus service, rail facility and navigable waterways). 4 villages (8.51%) have agricultural credit societies and 1 village (2.13%) has a bank.

=== Agriculture ===
The economy of the Jalpaiguri district is mainly dependent on agriculture and plantations, and majority of the people are engaged in agriculture. Jalpaiguri is well-known for tea and timber. Other important crops are paddy, jute, tobacco, mustard seeds, sugarcane and wheat. The annual average rainfall is 3,440 mm, around double of that of Kolkata and the surrounding areas. The area is flood prone and the rivers often change course causing immense damage to crops and cultivated lands.

In 2013-14, there were 97 fertiliser depots, 44 seed stores and 67 fair price shops in the Alipurduar I CD block.

In 2013–14, the Alipurduar I CD block produced 2,506 tonnes of Aman paddy, the main winter crop, from 1,297 hectares, 1,295 tonnes of Boro paddy (spring crop) from 482 hectares, 4,974 tonnes of Aus paddy (summer crop) from 2,850 hectares, 3,486 tonnes of wheat from 1,945 hectares, 610 tonnes of maize from 189 hectares, 15,390 tonnes of jute from 1,590 hectares and 127,427 tonnes of potatoes from 4,965 hectares. It also produced pulses and oilseeds.

In 2013-14, the total area irrigated in the Alipurduar I CD block was 5,605 hectares, out of which 2,465 hectares were irrigated by canal water, 226 hectares by tank water, 1,000 hectares by river lift irrigation, 150 hectares by deep tube wells, 1,675 hectares by shallow tube wells, 89 hectares by open dug wells.

=== Dooars-Terai tea gardens ===
Tea gardens in the Dooars and Terai regions produce 226 million kg or over a quarter of India's total tea crop.. The Dooars-Terai tea is characterized by a bright, smooth and full-bodied liquor that's a wee bit lighter than Assam tea. Cultivation of tea in the Dooars was primarily pioneered and promoted by the British but there was significant contribution of Indian entrepreneurs.

=== Banking ===
In 2013-14, Alipurduar I CD block had offices of 7 commercial banks and 2 gramin banks.

=== Backward Regions Grant Fund ===
The Jalpaiguri district is listed as a backward region and receives financial support from the Backward Regions Grant Fund. The fund, created by the Government of India, is designed to redress regional imbalances in development. As of 2012, 272 districts across the country were listed under this scheme. The list includes 11 districts of West Bengal.

== Transport ==
Alipurduar I CD block has 8 ferry services and 3 originating/ terminating bus routes.

NH 317 passes through the block.

== Education ==
In 2013-14, Alipurduar I CD block had 139 primary schools with 13,550 students, 7 middle schools with 1,494 students, 7 high school with 6,961 students and 14 higher secondary schools with 19,651 students. Alipurduar I CD block had 1 general degree college with 3,491 students, 454 institutions for special and non-formal education with 24,090 students.

See also – Education in India

According to the 2011 census, in the Alipurduar I CD block, among the 47 inhabited villages, 1 village did not have a school, 40 villages had two or more primary schools, 20 villages had at least 1 primary and 1 middle school and 13 villages had at least 1 middle and 1 secondary school.

Pijushkanti Mukherjee Mahavidyalaya was established at Sonapur in 2015. Affiliated with the University of North Bengal, it offers courses in arts.

== Healthcare ==
In 2014, Alipurduar I CD block had 1 rural hospital, 2 primary health centres and 3 NGO/ private nursing homes with total 44 beds and 4 doctors (excluding private bodies). It had 36 family welfare subcentres. 3,933 patients were treated indoor and 138,952 patients were treated outdoor in the hospitals, health centres and subcentres of the CD block.

Pachkalguri Rural Hospital, with 30 beds at Pachkalguri, is the major government medical facility in the Alipurduar I CD block. There are primary health centres at Munshipara (PO Salkumarhat) (with 4 beds), Silbarihat (with 10 beds).
