= Sonapur, Alipurduar =

Sonapur
- Village
- Location in West Bengal, India Sonapur (India)
- Coordinates: 26.49844°N 89.37565°E
- Country: India
- State: West Bengal
- District: Alipurduar

Population (2011)
  - Total: 5,632
- Time zone: UTC+5:30 (IST)
- PIN: 736204
- Telephone/STD code: 03564
- Vehicle registration: WB
- Lok Sabha constituency: Alipurduars
- Vidhan Sabha constituency: Alipurduars
- Website: alipurduar.gov.in

Sonapur is a village in the Alipurduar I CD block in the Alipurduar subdivision of the Alipurduar district in the state of West Bengal, India.

== Geography ==
Places and tea estates in the western portion of Alipurdar subdivision (including Madarihat-Birpara, Falakata and Alipuduar I CD blocks) in Alipurduar district
CT: census town, R: rural/ urban centre, N: neighbourhood, NP: national park/ wildlife sanctuary, TE: tea estate
Abbreviations used in names – TG for Tea Garden (town/village), TE for Tea Estate
Owing to space constraints in the small map, the actual locations in a larger map may vary slightly

=== Location ===
Sonapur is located at 26.49844°N 89.37565°E.

=== Area overview ===
Alipurduar district is covered by two maps. It is an extensive area in the eastern end of the Dooars in West Bengal. It is undulating country, largely forested, with numerous rivers flowing down from the outer ranges of the Himalayas in Bhutan. It is a predominantly rural area with 79.38% of the population living in the rural areas. The district has 1 municipal town and 20 census towns and that means that 20.62% of the population lives in urban areas. The scheduled castes and scheduled tribes, taken together, form more than half the population in all the six community development blocks in the district. There is a high concentration of tribal people (scheduled tribes) in the three northern blocks of the district.

Note: The map alongside presents some of the notable locations in the subdivision. All places marked in the map are linked in the larger full screen map.

== Demographics ==
As per the 2011 Census of India, Uttar Sonapur had a total population of 5,632. There were 2,938 (52%) males and 2,694 (48%) females. There were 646 persons in the age range of 0 to 6 years. The total number of literate people in Uttar Sonapur was 3,822 (76.65% of the population over 6 years).

== Education ==
Pijushkanti Mukherjee Mahavidyalaya was established at Sonapur in 2015. Affiliated with the University of North Bengal, it offers courses in arts.

== Healthcare ==
Pachkalguri Rural Hospital, with 30 beds, at Pachkalguri, is the major government medical facility in the Alipurduar I CD block.
