= Bholar Dabri =

- Census Town
- Location in West Bengal, India Bholar Dabri (India)
- Coordinates: 26.52°N 89.56°E
- Country: India
- State: West Bengal
- District: Alipurduar

Area
  - Total: 2.4 km^{2} (0.93 sq mi)

Population (2011)
  - Total: 12,670
  - Density: 5,300/km^{2} (14,000/sq mi)
- Time zone: UTC+5:30 (IST)
- Vehicle registration: WB
- Lok Sabha constituency: Alipurduars (ST)
- Vidhan Sabha constituency: Alipurduars (ST)
- Website: alipurduar.gov.in

Bholar Dabri is a census town in the Alipurduar I CD block in the Alipurduar subdivision of the Alipurduar district in the state of West Bengal, India.

== Geography ==
=== Location ===
Bholar Dabri is located at 26.52°N 89.56°E.

=== Area overview ===
It is an extensive area in the eastern end of the Dooars in West Bengal. It is undulating country, largely forested, with numerous rivers flowing down from the outer ranges of the Himalayas in Bhutan. It is a predominantly rural area with 79.38% of the population living in the rural areas and the rest in urban areas. The district has 1 municipal town and 20 census towns. The scheduled castes and scheduled tribes, taken together, form more than half the population in all the six community development blocks in the district. There is a high concentration of tribal people (scheduled tribes) in the three northern blocks of the district.

== Demographics ==
According to the 2011 Census of India, Bholar Dabri had a total population of 12,670 of which 6,461 (51%) were males and 6,209 (49%) were females. There were 1057 persons in the age range of 0 to 6 years. The total number of literate people in Bholar Dabri was 10,420 (89.73% of the population over 6 years).

As of 2001 India census, Bholar Dabri had a population of 10,010. Males constitute 52% of the population and females 48%. Bholar Dabri has an average literacy rate of 79%, higher than the national average of 59.5%; with male literacy of 84% and female literacy of 73%. 10% of the population is under 6 years of age.

== Infrastructure ==
According to the District Census Handbook 2011, Jalpaiguri, Bholar Dabri covered an area of 2.4 km^{2}. Among the civic amenities, it had 25 km roads, with open drains, the protected water supply involved tap water from treated sources, tubewell, borewell. It had 2,700 domestic electric connections. Among the medical facilities it had 2 dispensary/ health centres, 5 medicine shops. Among the educational facilities it had 6 primary schools, 1 middle school, 1 secondary school. It had 6 non-formal education centres (Sarva Shiksha Abhiyan). Among the social, recreational, cultural facilities it had 1 public library.
