= Uttar Satali =

- Census Town
- Location in West Bengal, India Uttar Satali (India)
- Coordinates: 26.7114°N 89.3631°E
- Country: India
- State: West Bengal
- District: Alipurduar

Area
  - Total: 4.9089 km^{2} (1.8953 sq mi)

Population (2011)
  - Total: 18,454
  - Density: 3,759.3/km^{2} (9,736.5/sq mi)
- Time zone: UTC+5:30 (IST)
- PIN: 734215
- Telephone/STD code: 03566
- Vehicle registration: WB
- Lok Sabha constituency: Alipurduars
- Vidhan Sabha constituency: Kalchini
- Website: alipurduar.gov.in

Uttar Satali is a census town in the Kalchini CD block in the Alipurduar subdivision of the Alipurduar district in the state of West Bengal, India.

== Geography ==
Places and tea estates in the eastern portion of Alipurdar subdivision (including Kalchini, Kumargram and Alipuduar II CD blocks) in Alipurduar district
CT: census town, R: rural/ urban centre, N: neighbourhood, A: Air Force Station, NP: national park/ wildlife sanctuary, TE: tea estate, H: historical site
Abbreviations used in names – TG for Tea Garden (town/village), TE for Tea Estate
Owing to space constraints in the small map, the actual locations in a larger map may vary slightly

=== Location ===
Uttar Satali is located at 26.7114°N 89.3631°E.

=== Area overview ===
Alipurduar district is covered by two maps. It is an extensive area in the eastern end of the Dooars in West Bengal. It is undulating country, largely forested, with numerous rivers flowing down from the outer ranges of the Himalayas in Bhutan. The area is predominantly rural, with 79.38% of the population living in rural areas. The district has 1 municipal town and 20 census towns. The scheduled castes and scheduled tribes, taken together, form more than half the population in all the six community development blocks in the district. There is a high concentration of tribal people (scheduled tribes) in the three northern blocks of the district.

Note: The map alongside presents some of the notable locations in the subdivision. All places marked in the map are linked in the larger full screen map.

== Demographics ==
As per the 2011 Census of India, Uttar Satali had a total population of 18,454. There were 14,405 (78%) males and 4,049 (22%) females. There were 1,594 persons in the age range of 0 to 6 years. The total number of literate people in Uttar Satali was 1,642 (97.40% of the population over 6 years).

== Infrastructure ==
According to the District Census Handbook 2011, Jalpaiguri, Uttar Satali covered an area of 4.9089 km^{2}. Among the civic amenities, the protected water supply involved overhead tank, tap water from untreated sources. It had 1,375 domestic electric connections, 200 road lighting point. Among the medical facilities it had 1 hospital, 1 maternity & child welfare centre. Among the educational facilities it had 1 primary school, 1 middle school, 1 secondary school, 1 senior secondary school, the nearest general degree college at Alipurduar 35 km away. It had office of 1 nationalised bank.

== Healthcare ==
There is a primary health centre, with 4 beds, at Satali (PO Satali Mondalpur).
