= Paschim Jitpur =

- Census Town
- Location in West Bengal, India Paschim Jitpur (India)
- Coordinates: 26.55601°N 89.53493°E
- Country: India
- State: West Bengal
- District: Alipurduar

Area
  - Total: 6.32 km^{2} (2.44 sq mi)

Population (2011)
  - Total: 14,334
  - Density: 2,270/km^{2} (5,870/sq mi)

Languages
  - Official: Bengali, English
- Time zone: UTC+5:30 (IST)
- Vehicle registration: WB
- Lok Sabha constituency: Alipurduars (ST)
- Vidhan Sabha constituency: Alipurduars (ST)
- Website: alipurduar.gov.in

Paschim Jitpur is a census town in the Alipurduar I CD block in the Alipurduar subdivision of the Alipurduar district in the Indian state of West Bengal.

== Geography ==
Places and tea estates in the western portion of Alipurdar subdivision (including Madarihat-Birpara, Falakata and Alipuduar I CD blocks) in Alipurduar district
CT: census town, R: rural/ urban centre, N: neighbourhood, NP: national park/ wildlife sanctuary, TE: tea estate
Abbreviations used in names – TG for Tea Garden (town/village), TE for Tea Estate
Owing to space constraints in the small map, the actual locations in a larger map may vary slightly

=== Location ===
Paschim Jitpur is located at 26.55601°N 89.53493°E.

=== Area overview ===
Alipurduar district is covered by two maps. It is an extensive area in the eastern end of the Dooars in West Bengal. It is undulating country, largely forested, with numerous rivers flowing down from the outer ranges of the Himalayas in Bhutan. It is a predominantly rural area with 79.38% of the population living in the urban areas. The district has 1 municipal town and 20 census towns and that means that 20.62% of the population lives in rural areas. The scheduled castes and scheduled tribes, taken together, form more than half the population in all the six community development blocks in the district. There is a high concentration of tribal people (scheduled tribes) in the three northern blocks of the district.

Note: The map alongside presents some of the notable locations in the subdivision. All places marked in the map are linked in the larger full screen map.

== Demographics ==
According to the 2011 Census of India, Paschim Jitpur had a total population of 14,334 of which 7,189 (50%) were males and 7,145 (50%) were females. There were 1,302 persons in the age range of 0 to 6 years. The total number of literate people in Paschim Jitpur was 11,146 (85.53% of the population over 6 years).

As of the 2001 India census, Paschim Jitpur had a population of 13,389. Males constitute 51% of the population and females 49%. Paschim Jitpur has an average literacy rate of 70%, higher than the national average of 59.5%: male literacy is 77%, and female literacy is 64%. In Paschim Jitpur, 11% of the population is under 6 years of age.

== Infrastructure ==
According to the District Census Handbook 2011, Jalpaiguri, Paschim Jitpur covered an area of 6.32 km^{2}. Among the civic amenities, it had 15 km roads, with both closed and open drains, the protected water supply involved overhead tank, hand pump. It had 1,900 domestic electric connections. Among the medical facilities it had 3 dispensaries/ health centres, 10 medicine shops. Among the educational facilities it had 8 primary schools, 1 middle school, 1 secondary school, 3 senior secondary schools, the nearest general degree college at Alipurduar 2.5 km away. It had 1 recognised shorthand, typewriting, vocational training institute, 1 non-formal education centre (Sarva Siksha Abhiyan). Among the social, cultural and recreational facilities it had 1 public library.
