= Kalchini =

- Community development block
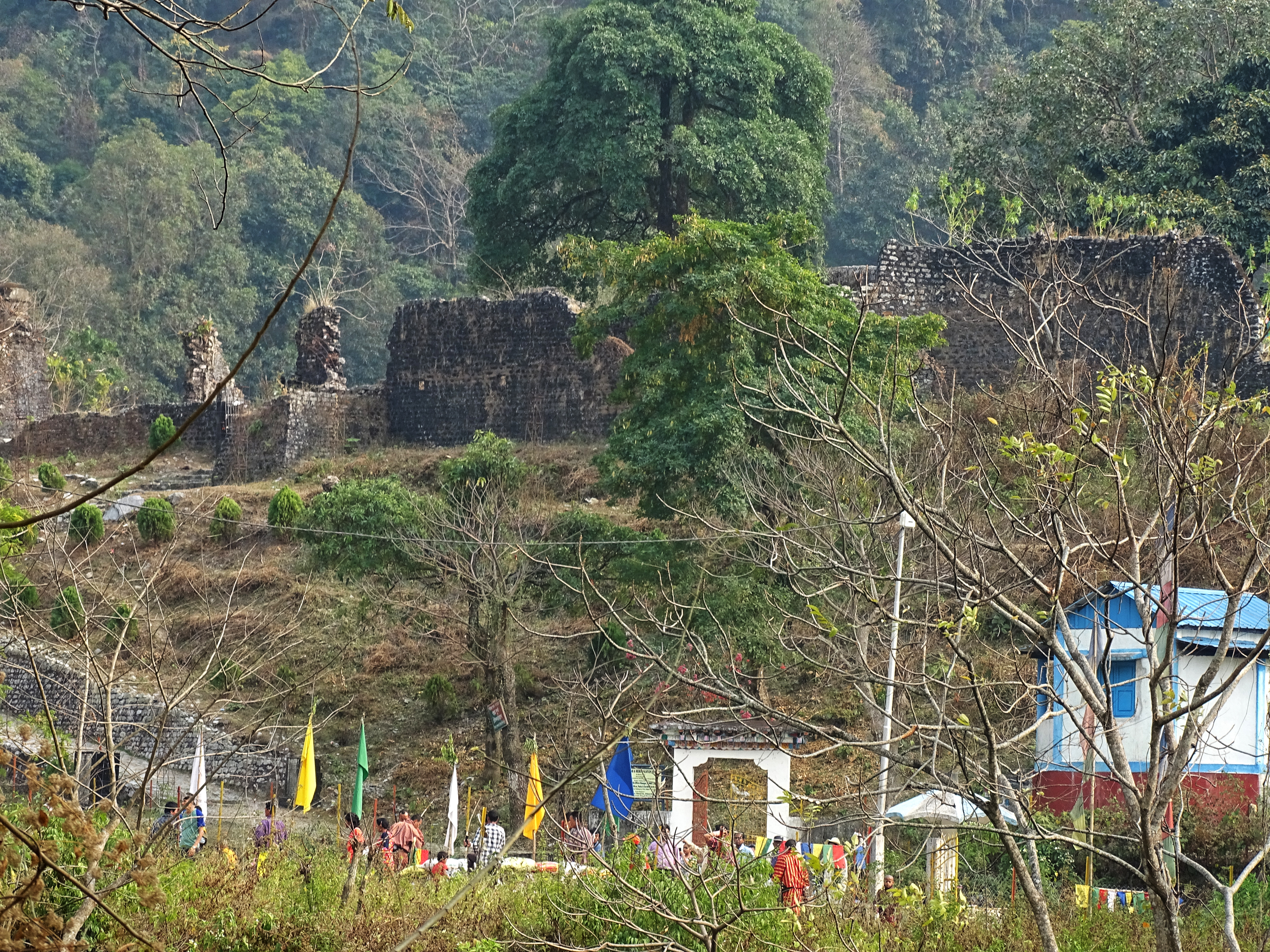
- Buxa Fort

- Location in West Bengal, India
- Coordinates: 26.692778°N 89.471667°E
- Country: India
- State: West Bengal
- District: Alipurduar

Area
  - Total: 711.61 km^{2} (274.75 sq mi)

Population (2011)
  - Total: 298,548
  - Density: 419.54/km^{2} (1,086.6/sq mi)

Languages
  - Official: Bengali, English
- Time zone: UTC+5:30 (IST)
- Lok Sabha constituency: Alipurduars
- Vidhan Sabha constituency: Kalchini
- Website: bdokalchini.in

Kalchini is a community development block (CD block) that forms an administrative division in the Alipurduar subdivision of the Alipurduar district in the Indian state of West Bengal.

== Geography ==
The Kalchini CD block lies in north-central part of the district. The Torsha River/ Holong River flows along the western boundary of the CD block and the Kaljani River flows through it. It has hilly terrain which is part of the sub-Himalayan ranges.

The Kalchini CD block is bounded by the Chukha District in Bhutan on the north, Kumargram and Alipurduar II CD blocks on the east, Alipurduar II CD block on the south and Madarihat-Birpara CD block on the west.

The Kalchini CD block has an area of 711.61 km^{2}. It has 1 panchayat samity, 11 gram panchayats, 193 gram sansads (village councils), 43 mouzas, 41 inhabited villages and 4 census towns. Kalchini and Jaigaon police stations serve this block. Headquarters of this CD block is at Kalchini.

Gram panchayats of Kalchini block/ panchayat samiti are: Chuapara, Dalsingpara, Garopara, Jaigaon I, Jaigaon II, Kalchini, Latabari, Malangi, Mendabari, Rajabhatkhawa and Satali.

== Demographics ==
=== Population ===
According to the 2011 Census of India, the Kalchini CD block had a total population of 298,458, of which 211,808 were rural, and 86,650 were urban. There were 154,829 (52%) males and 143,269 (48%) females. There were 34,627 persons in the age range of 0 to 6 years. The Scheduled Castes numbered 30,157 (10.10%) and the Scheduled Tribes numbered 120,282 (40.30%).

According to the 2001 census, Kalchini block had a total population of 252,322, out of which 128,622 were males and 123,700 were females. Kalchini block registered a population growth of 24.26 per cent during the 1991-2001 decade.

Census towns in the Kalchini CD block are (2011 census figures in brackets): Jaigaon (42,254), Mechiabasti (9,592), Uttar Satali (18,454), Uttar Latabari (16,354).

Large villages (with 4,000+ population) in the Kalchini CD block are (2011 census figures in brackets): Saudamini Tea Garden (4,225), Madhu Tea Garden (4,540), Satali Tea Garden (12,178), Malangi Tea Garden (9516), Beech Tea Garden (6,898), Bharnobari Tea Garden (7,057), Dalsingpara Tea Garden (17,167), Tosra Tea Garden (7,258), Gopimohan Tea Garden (8,290), Nimtijhora Tea Garden (4,120), Rangamati Tea Garden (9,987), Chuapara Tea Garden (7,229), Mechpara Tea Garden (6,112), Bhatpara Tea Garden (9,985), Kalchini Tea Garden (22,072), Gangutia Tea Garden (5,360), Dima Tea Garden (5,830), Bhatkhawa Tea Garden (6,680), Atiabari Tea Garden (7,504), Rajabhat Tea Garden (4,275) and Buxa Forest (Raja Bhatkhawa) (9,242).

Other villages in the Kalchini CD block include (2011 census figures in brackets): Uttar Mandabari (3,481), Buxa HillForest (2,889) and Buxa Forest (Panbari Khanda) (861).

=== Literacy ===
According to the 2011 census, the total number of literate persons in the Kalchini CD block was 181,946 (68.96% of the population over 6 years) out of which males numbered 106,237 (77.45% of the male population over 6 years) and females numbered 75,709 (59.77% of the female population over 6 years). The gender disparity (the difference between female and male literacy rates) was 17.67%.

See also – List of West Bengal districts ranked by literacy rate

Literacy in CD blocks of
Jalpaiguri district
Jalpaiguri Sadar subdivision
Rajganj – 62.82%
Jalpaiguri – 73.81%
Maynaguri – 75.63%
Dhupguri – 60.57%
Malbazar subdivision
Mal – 66.31
Matiali – 66.98%
Nagrakata – 61.27%
Alipurduar subdivision
Madarihat-Birpara – 67.77%
Kalchini – 68.96%
Kumargram – 72.42%
Alipurduar I – 78.19%
Alipurduar II – 75.76%
Falakata – 72.64%
2011 Census: CD Block Wise

Primary Census Abstract Data

=== Language and religion ===
Religion in Kalchini CD block (2011)
Hinduism	67.08%
Christianity	14.33%
Islam	8.57%
Buddhism	7.28%
Tribal religion	2.00%
Sikhism	0.50%
Other or not stated	0.24%

In the 2011 Census of India, Hindus numbered 200,214 and formed 67.08% of the population of Kalchini CD block. Christians numbered 42,780 and formed 14.33% of the population. Muslims numbered 25,591 and formed 8.57% of the population. Buddhists numbered 21,731 and formed 7.28% of the population. Others numbered 5,957 and formed 17.06% of the population. Others include Addi Bassi, Marang Boro, Santal, Saranath, Sari Dharma, Sarna, Alchchi, Bidin, Sant, Saevdharm, Seran, Saran, Sarin, Kheria, Kirat Mundhum, Mun, and other religious communities.

Languages of Kalchini CD block (2011)
1. Sadri (30.1%)
2. Nepali (26.3%)
3. Bengali (14.2%)
4. Hindi (8.17%)
5. Bhojpuri (3.93%)
6. Kurukh (2.99%)
7. Boro (2.85%)
8. Rabha (1.73%)
9. Others (9.73%)

At the time of the 2011 census, 30.05% of the population spoke Sadri, 26.34% Nepali, 14.21% Bengali, 8.17% Hindi, 3.93% Bhojpuri, 2.99% Kurukh, 2.85% Boro and 1.73% Rabha as their first language. Other languages spoken by small numbers in the district include Mundari, Urdu, Santali, and Tamang.

== Poverty level ==
Based on a study of the per capita consumption in rural and urban areas, using central sample data of NSS 55th Round 1999-2000, Jalpaiguri district was found to have relatively high rates of poverty of 35.73% in rural areas and 61.53% in the urban areas. It was one of the few districts where urban poverty rate was higher than the rural poverty rate.

According to a World Bank report, as of 2012, 26-31% of the population of Jalpaiguri, Bankura and Paschim Medinipur districts were below poverty line, a relatively high level of poverty in West Bengal, which had an average 20% of the population below poverty line.

== Economy ==
=== Livelihood ===
Livelihood
in Kalchini CD block
1. Cultivators (6.20%)
2. Agricultural labourers (7.06%)
3. Household industries (1.88%)
4. Other Workers (84.9%)

In the Kalchini CD block in 2011, among the class of total workers, cultivators numbered 7,459 and formed 6.20%, agricultural labourers numbered 8,487 and formed 7.06%, household industry workers numbered 2,256 and formed 1.88% and other workers numbered 102,036 and formed 84.86%. Total workers numbered 120,238 and formed 40.29% of the total population, and non-workers numbered 178,220 and formed 59.71% of the population.

Note: In the census records a person is considered a cultivator, if the person is engaged in cultivation/ supervision of land owned by self/government/institution. When a person who works on another person's land for wages in cash or kind or share, is regarded as an agricultural labourer. Household industry is defined as an industry conducted by one or more members of the family within the household or village, and one that does not qualify for registration as a factory under the Factories Act. Other workers are persons engaged in some economic activity other than cultivators, agricultural labourers and household workers. It includes factory, mining, plantation, transport and office workers, those engaged in business and commerce, teachers, entertainment artistes and so on.

=== Infrastructure ===
There are 41 inhabited villages in the Kalchini CD block, as per the District Census Handbook, Jalpaiguri, 2011. 100% villages have power supply. 100% villages have drinking water supply. 18 villages (43.90%) have post offices. 40 villages (97.56%) have telephones (including landlines, public call offices and mobile phones). 24 villages (58.54%) have pucca (paved) approach roads and 26 villages (63.41%) have transport communication (includes bus service, rail facility and navigable waterways). 4 villages (9.76%) have banks.

=== Agriculture ===
The economy of the Jalpaiguri district is mainly dependent on agriculture and plantations, and majority of the people are engaged in agriculture. Jalpaiguri is well-known for tea and timber. Other important crops are paddy, jute, tobacco, mustard seeds, sugarcane and wheat. The annual average rainfall is 3,440 mm, around double of that of Kolkata and the surrounding areas. The area is flood prone and the rivers often change course causing immense damage to crops and cultivated lands.

In 2013-14, there were 7 fertiliser depots, 7 seed stores and 76 fair price shops in the Kalchini CD block.

In 2013–14, the Kalchini CD block produced 80,464 tonnes of Aman paddy, the main winter crop, from 34,551 hectares, 328 tonnes of Boro paddy (spring crop) from 175 hectares, 724 tonnes of Aus paddy (summer crop) from 377 hectares, 265 tonnes of wheat from 106 hectares, 4,665 tonnes of maize from 471 hectares, 3,033 tonnes of jute from 199 hectares and 3,757 tonnes of potatoes from 185 hectares. It also produced pulses and oilseeds.

In 2013-14, the total area irrigated in the Kalchini CD block was 2,123 hectares, out of which 1,242 hectares were irrigated by canal water, 50 hectares by tank water, 450 hectares by river lift irrigation, 360 hectares by shallow tube wells, 21 hectares by open dug wells.

=== Dooars-Terai tea gardens ===
Tea gardens in the Dooars and Terai regions produce 226 million kg or over a quarter of India's total tea crop.. The Dooars-Terai tea is characterized by a bright, smooth and full-bodied liquor that's a wee bit lighter than Assam tea. Cultivation of tea in the Dooars was primarily pioneered and promoted by the British but there was significant contribution of Indian entrepreneurs.

=== Banking ===
In 2013-14, Kalchini CD block had offices of 7 commercial banks and 4 gramin banks.

=== Backward Regions Grant Fund ===
The Jalpaiguri district is listed as a backward region and receives financial support from the Backward Regions Grant Fund. The fund, created by the Government of India, is designed to redress regional imbalances in development. As of 2012, 272 districts across the country were listed under this scheme. The list includes 11 districts of West Bengal.

== Transport ==
Kalchini railway station has 9 originating/ terminating bus routes.

NH 317 passes through the block. Kalchini is on the New Jalpaiguri-Alipurduar-Samuktala Road Line.

== Education ==
In 2013-14, Kalchini CD block had 111 primary schools with 14,316 students, 11 middle schools with 2,976 students, 9 high school with 8,519 students and 13 higher secondary schools with 19,830 students. Kalchini CD block had 1 general degree college with 2,817 students, 2 technical/ professional institutions with 206 students, 868 institutions for special and non-formal education with 35,788 students.

See also – Education in India

According to the 2011 census, in the Kalchini CD block, among the 41 inhabited villages, 1 village did not have a school, 35 villages had two or more primary schools, 25 villages had at least 1 primary and 1 middle school and 12 villages had at least 1 middle and 1 secondary school.

Nani Bhattacharya Smarak Mahavidyalaya was established in 2000 at Mangalbari, PO Jaigaon. Affiliated with the University of North Bengal, it offers courses in arts.

== Healthcare ==
In 2014, Kalchini CD block had 1 rural hospital, 2 primary health centres 1 central government institution and 4 NGO/ private nursing homes with total 194 beds and 15 doctors (excluding private bodies). It had 48 family welfare subcentres. 7,294 patients were treated indoor and 104,492 patients were treated outdoor in the hospitals, health centres and subcentres of the CD block.

Uttarlatabari Rural Hospital, with 30 beds at Kalchini, is the major government medical facility in the Kalchini CD block. There are primary health centres at Satali (PO Satali Mandalpara) (with 4 beds), Jaigaon (?).
