= Mechiabasti =

- Census Town
- Location in West Bengal, India Mechiabasti (India)
- Coordinates: 26.8354°N 89.3723°E
- Country: India
- State: West Bengal
- District: Alipurduar

Area
  - Total: 1.983 km^{2} (0.766 sq mi)
- Elevation: 105 m (344 ft)

Population (2011)
  - Total: 9,592
  - Density: 4,837/km^{2} (12,530/sq mi)
- Time zone: UTC+5:30 (IST)
- PIN: 736182
- Telephone/STD code: 03566
- Vehicle registration: WB
- Lok Sabha constituency: Alipurduars
- Vidhan Sabha constituency: Kalchini
- Website: alipurduar.gov.in

Mechiabasti is a census town in the Kalchini CD block in the Alipurduar subdivision of the Alipurduar district in the Indian state of West Bengal.

== Geography ==
Places and tea estates in the eastern portion of Alipurdar subdivision (including Kalchini, Kumargram and Alipuduar II CD blocks) in Alipurduar district
CT: census town, R: rural/ urban centre, N: neighbourhood, A: Air Force Station, NP: national park/ wildlife sanctuary, TE: tea estate, H: historical site
Abbreviations used in names – TG for Tea Garden (town/village), TE for Tea Estate
Owing to space constraints in the small map, the actual locations in a larger map may vary slightly

=== Location ===
Mechiabasti is located at 26.8354°N 89.3723°E.

=== Area overview ===
Alipurduar district is covered by two maps. It is an extensive area in the eastern end of the Dooars in West Bengal. It is undulating country, largely forested, with numerous rivers flowing down from the outer ranges of the Himalayas in Bhutan. It is a predominantly rural area with 79.38% in rural areas. The district has 1 municipal town and 20 census towns. The scheduled castes and scheduled tribes, taken together, form more than half the population in all the six community development blocks in the district. There is a high concentration of tribal people (scheduled tribes) in the three northern blocks of the district.

Note: The map alongside presents some of the notable locations in the subdivision. All places marked in the map are linked in the larger full screen map.

== Demographics ==
As per the 2011 Census of India, Mechiabasti had a total population of 9,592. There were 4,898 (51%) males and 4,694 (49%) females. There were 1,315 persons in the age range of 0 to 6 years. The total number of literate people in Mechiabasti was 5,407 (65.33% of the population over 6 years).

== Infrastructure ==
According to the District Census Handbook 2011, Jalpaiguri, Mechiabasti covered an area of 1.983 km^{2}. Among the civic amenities, the protected water supply involved tube well, borewell, hand pump. It had 400 domestic electric connections. Among the medical facilities it had 1 dispensary/, 1 medicine shop. Among the educational facilities it had 2 primary schools, the nearest middle school at Torsa 3 km away, the nearest secondary school, the nearest senior secondary school at Dallingpara 5 km away.

== Education ==
Nani Bhattacharya Smarak Mahavidyalaya was established in 2000 at Mangalbari, PO Jaigaon. Affiliated with the University of North Bengal, it offers courses in arts.
