= Uttar Latabari =

- Census Town
- Location in West Bengal, India Uttar Latabari (India)
- Coordinates: 26.68°N 89.44°E
- Country: India
- State: West Bengal
- District: Alipurduar

Population (2011)
  - Total: 16,350

Languages
  - Official: Bengali, English
- Time zone: UTC+5:30 (IST)
- Vehicle registration: WB
- Lok Sabha constituency: Alipurduars (ST)
- Vidhan Sabha constituency: Kalchini (ST)
- Website: jalpaiguri.gov.in

Uttar Latabari is a census town in the Kalchini CD block in the Alipurduar subdivision of the Alipurduar district in the Indian state of West Bengal.

== Geography ==
Places and tea estates in the eastern portion of Alipurdar subdivision (including Kalchini, Kumargram and Alipuduar II CD blocks) in Alipurduar district
CT: census town, R: rural/ urban centre, N: neighbourhood, A: Air Force Station, NP: national park/ wildlife sanctuary, TE: tea estate, H: historical site
Abbreviations used in names – TG for Tea Garden (town/village), TE for Tea Estate
Owing to space constraints in the small map, the actual locations in a larger map may vary slightly

=== Location ===
Uttar Latabari is located at 26.68°N 89.44°E.

According to the map of the Kalchini CD block on page 217 of the District Census Handbook, Jalpaiguri, 2011 census, Kalchini (Hamiltonganj) police station and CD block headquarters are shown as being part of Uttar Latabari census town/ mouza.

=== Area overview ===
Alipurduar district is covered by two maps. It is an extensive area in the eastern end of the Dooars in West Bengal. It is undulating country, largely forested, with numerous rivers flowing down from the outer ranges of the Himalayas in Bhutan. It is a predominantly rural area with 79.38% of the population living in the rural areas. The district has 1 municipal town and 20 census towns. The scheduled castes and scheduled tribes, taken together, form more than half the population in all the six community development blocks in the district. There is a high concentration of tribal people (scheduled tribes) in the three northern blocks of the district.

Note: The map alongside presents some of the notable locations in the subdivision. All places marked in the map are linked in the larger full screen map.

== Demographics ==
According to the 2011 Census of India, Uttar Latabari had a total population of 16,350 of which 8,225 (50%) were males and 8,125 (50%) were females. There were 1,581 persons in the age range of 0 to 6 years. The total number of literate people in Uttar Latabari was 12,289 (83.21% of the population over 6 years).

As of 2001 India census, Uttar Latabari had a population of 14,447. Males constitute 51% of the population and females 49%. Uttar Latabari has an average literacy rate of 69%, higher than the national average of 59.5%: male literacy is 75%, and female literacy is 62%. In Uttar Latabari, 11% of the population is under 6 years of age.

== Healthcare ==
Uttarlatabari Rural Hospital, with 30 beds at Kalchini, is the major government medical facility in the Kalchini CD block.
