= Falakata (community development block) =

- Community development block
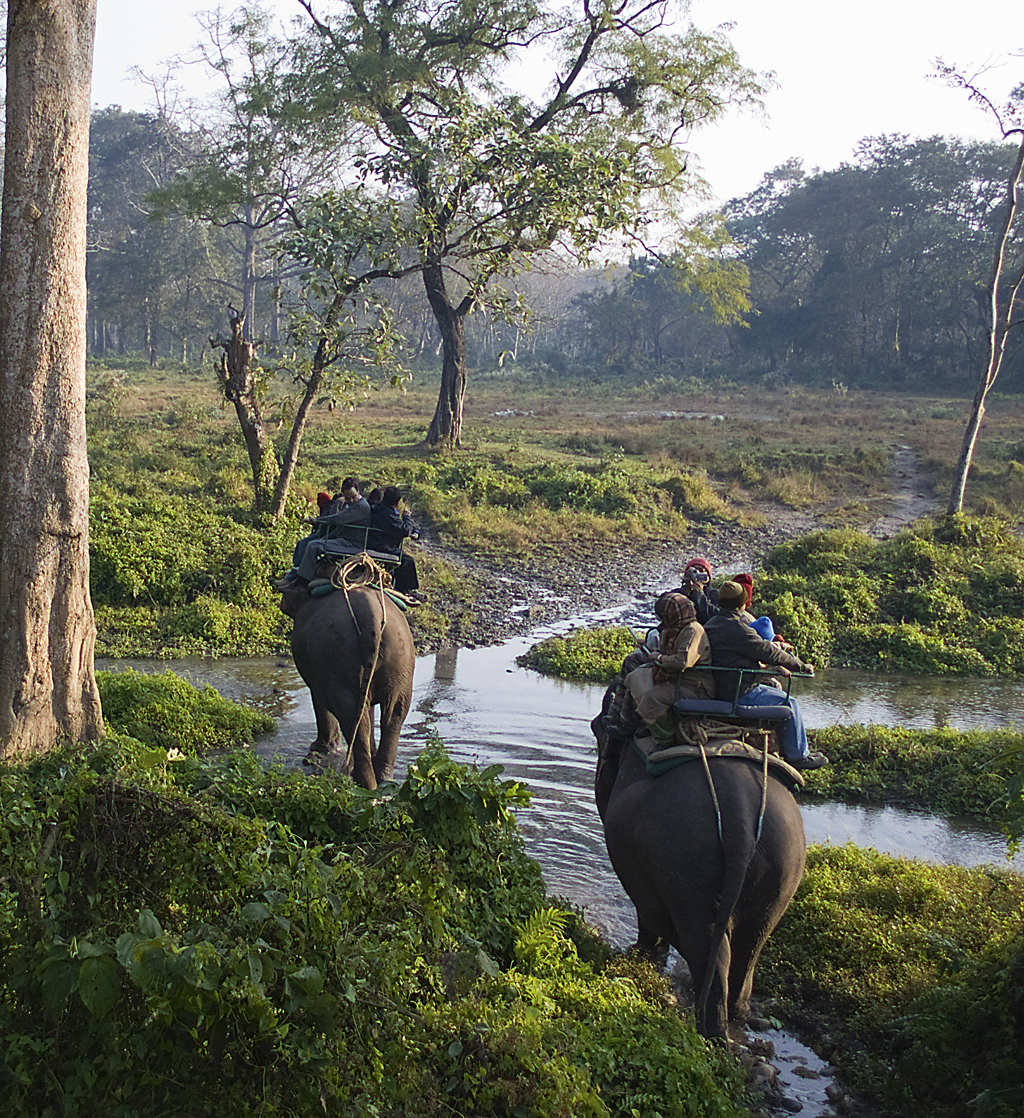
- Elephant safari in Jaldapara National Park

- Coordinates: 26.53°N 89.20°E
- Country: India
- State: West Bengal
- District: Alipurduar

Area
  - Total: 353.93 km^{2} (136.65 sq mi)

Population (2011)
  - Total: 290,722
  - Density: 821.41/km^{2} (2,127.4/sq mi)

Languages
  - Official: Bengali, English
- Time zone: UTC+5:30 (IST)
- Lok Sabha constituency: Alipurduars
- Vidhan Sabha constituency: Falakata
- Website: alipurduar.gov.in

Falakata is a community development block (CD block) that forms an administrative division in the Alipurduar subdivision of the Alipurduar district in the Indian state of West Bengal.

== Geography ==
Falakata is located at 26°32′N 89°12′E.

The Falakata CD block lies in the south-western part of the district. The Dadua River flows along the western boundary and the Torsha River flows along the eastern boundary of the district. It has hilly terrain which is part of the sub-Himalayan ranges.

The Falakata CD block is bounded by the Madarihat-Birpara CD block on the north, Alipurduar I CD block on the east, Mathabhanga II, Cooch Behar II CD blocks in Cooch Behar district on the south, Banarhat and Dhupguri CD block in Jalpaiguri district on the west.

The Falakata CD block has an area of 353.93 km^{2}. It has 1 panchayat samity, 12 gram panchayats, 206 gram sansads (village councils), 63 mouzas, 60 inhabited villages and 4 census towns. Falakata police station serves this block. Headquarters of this CD block is at Falakata.

Gram panchayats of Falakata block/ panchayat samiti are: Dalgaon, Deogaon, Dhanirampur I, Dhanirampur II, Jateswar I, Jateswar II, Mairadanga, Parangerpar and Salkumar. Gram panchayats of Falakata block Falakata I, Falakata II, Guabarnagar are now part of Falakata Municipality.

== Demographics ==
=== Population ===
According to the 2011 Census of India, the Falakata CD block had a total population of 290,722, of which 244,161 were rural, and 46,561 were urban. There were 149,626 (51%) males and 141,096 (49%) females. There were 34,843 persons in the age range of 0 to 6 years. The Scheduled Castes numbered 118,281 (40.69%) and the Scheduled Tribes numbered 46,293 (15.92%).

According to the 2001 census, Falakata block had a total population of 254,027, out of which 131,066 were males and 122,961 were females. Falakata block registered a population growth of 22.22 per cent during the 1991-2001 decade.

Census towns in the Falakata CD block are (2011 census figures in brackets): Jagijhora Barabak (6,474), Jateswar (8,963), Parangarpar (11,408) and Falakata (19,716).

Large villages (with 4,000+ population) in the Falakata CD block are (2011 census figures in brackets): Narsinghpur (4,101), Deomali (5,949), Khagenhat (5,185), Dhanirampur (5,380), Pramode Nagar (4,100), Jaychandpur (4,186), Baganbari (4,533), Dalimpur (4,841), Kathalbari (4,107), Hedayet Nagar(6,984), Tasti Tea Garden (5,568), Dalgaon Tea Garden (5,215), Dhulagaon (4,684), Purbba Jhar Beltali (4,144), Nabanagar (4,719), Jogendrapur (4,204), Satpukuria (4,732), Mairadanga (6,167), Talukertari (5,020), Chhota Salkumar (4,515), Umacharanpur (5,612), Khauchandpara (5,222), Sibnathpur (5,166), Lachmandabri (4,376), Kunjanagar (4,605), Chuakhola (8,149), Raichenga (12,894) and Kalipur (5,165).

Other villages in the Falakata CD block include (2011 census figures in brackets): Guabarnagar (2,981), Uttar Deogaon (3,625), Purba Deogaon (2,071), Dakshin Deogaon (3,242) and Madhya Deogaon (3,156).

=== Literacy ===
According to the 2011 census, the total number of literate persons in the Falakata CD block was 185,868 (72.74% of the population over 6 years) out of which males numbered 103,815 (78.83% of the male population over 6 years) and females numbered 82,053 (66.08% of the female population over 6 years). The gender disparity (the difference between female and male literacy rates) was 12.75%.

See also – List of West Bengal districts ranked by literacy rate

Literacy in CD blocks of
Jalpaiguri district
Jalpaiguri Sadar subdivision
Rajganj – 62.82%
Jalpaiguri – 73.81%
Maynaguri – 75.63%
Dhupguri – 60.57%
Malbazar subdivision
Mal – 66.31
Matiali – 66.98%
Nagrakata – 61.27%
Alipurduar subdivision
Madarihat-Birpara – 67.77%
Kalchini – 68.96%
Kumargram – 72.42%
Alipurduar I – 78.19%
Alipurduar II – 75.76%
Falakata – 72.64%
2011 Census: CD Block Wise

Primary Census Abstract Data

=== Language and religion ===
Religion in Falakata CD block (2011)
| Hinduism | 82.00% |
| Islam | 15.79% |
| Christianity | 1.75% |
| Other or not stated | 0.46% |

In the 2011 Census of India, Hindus numbered 238,406 and formed 82.00% of the population of Falakata CD block. Muslims numbered 45,894 and formed 15.79% of the population. Christians numbered 5,080 and formed 1.75% of the population. Buddhists numbered 130 and formed 0.04% of the population. Others numbered 6,292 and formed 2.16% of the population. Others include Addi Bassi, Marang Boro, Santal, Saranath, Sari Dharma, Sarna, Alchchi, Bidin, Sant, Saevdharm, Seran, Saran, Sarin, Kheria, and other religious communities.

Languages of Falakata CD block (2011)
1. Bengali (70.7%)
2. Sadri (11.2%)
3. 'Other' Bengali (7.53%)
4. Rajbongshi (2.92%)
5. Boro (1.60%)
6. Hindi (1.34%)
7. Santali (1.33%)
8. Mundari (1.05%)
9. Others (2.32%)

At the time of the 2011 census, 70.74% of the population spoke Bengali, 11.17% Sadri, 2.92% Rajbongshi, 1.60% Boro, 1.34% Hindi, 1.33% Santali and 1.05% Mundari as their first language. 7.53% were recorded as speaking 'Other' under Bengali.

== Poverty level ==
Based on a study of the per capita consumption in rural and urban areas, using central sample data of NSS 55th Round 1999-2000, Jalpaiguri district was found to have relatively high rates of poverty of 35.73% in rural areas and 61.53% in the urban areas. It was one of the few districts where urban poverty rate was higher than the rural poverty rate.

According to a World Bank report, as of 2012, 26-31% of the population of Jalpaiguri, Bankura and Paschim Medinipur districts were below poverty line, a relatively high level of poverty in West Bengal, which had an average 20% of the population below poverty line.

== Economy ==
=== Livelihood ===
Livelihood
in Falakata CD block
1. Cultivators (20.7%)
2. Agricultural labourers (38.8%)
3. Household industries (1.66%)
4. Other Workers (38.9%)

In the Falakata CD block in 2011, among the class of total workers, cultivators numbered 23,309 and formed 20.68%, agricultural labourers numbered 43,693 and formed 38.77%, household industry workers numbered 1,875 and formed 1.66% and other workers numbered 43,809 and formed 38.88%. Total workers numbered 112,686 and formed 38.76% of the total population, and non-workers numbered 178,036 and formed 61.24% of the population.

Note: In the census records a person is considered a cultivator, if the person is engaged in cultivation/ supervision of land owned by self/government/institution. When a person who works on another person's land for wages in cash or kind or share, is regarded as an agricultural labourer. Household industry is defined as an industry conducted by one or more members of the family within the household or village, and one that does not qualify for registration as a factory under the Factories Act. Other workers are persons engaged in some economic activity other than cultivators, agricultural labourers and household workers. It includes factory, mining, plantation, transport and office workers, those engaged in business and commerce, teachers, entertainment artistes and so on.

=== Infrastructure ===
There are 60 inhabited villages in the Falakata CD block, as per the District Census Handbook, Jalpaiguri, 2011. All the villages have power supply and drinking water supply. 28 villages (46.67%) have post offices. 57 villages (95.00%) have telephones (including landlines, public call offices and mobile phones). 37 villages (61.67%) have pucca (paved) approach roads and 35 villages (58.33%) have transport communication (includes bus service, rail facility and navigable waterways). 10 villages (16.67%) have agricultural credit societies and 5 villages (8.33%) have banks.

=== Agriculture ===
The economy of the Jalpaiguri district is mainly dependent on agriculture and plantations, and majority of the people are engaged in agriculture. Jalpaiguri is well-known for tea and timber. Other important crops are paddy, jute, tobacco, mustard seeds, sugarcane and wheat. The annual average rainfall is 3,440 mm, around double of that of Kolkata and the surrounding areas. The area is flood prone and the rivers often change course causing immense damage to crops and cultivated lands.

In 2013-14, there were 162 fertiliser depots, 60 seed stores and 48 fair price shops in the Falakata CD block.

In 2013–14, the Falakata CD block produced 3,036 tonnes of Aman paddy, the main winter crop, from 1,908 hectares, 4,622 tonnes of Boro paddy (spring crop) from 1,581 hectares, 15,024 tonnes of Aus paddy (summer crop) from 8,598 hectares, 4,456 tonnes of wheat from 1,965 hectares, 2,510 tonnes of maize from 322 hectares, 31,584 tonnes of jute from 2,343 hectares, 215,341 tonnes of potatoes from 8,459 hectares and 921 tonnes of sugarcane from 9 hectares. It also produced pulses and oilseeds.

In 2013-14, the total area irrigated in the Falakata CD block was 7,396 hectares, out of which 3,216 hectares were irrigated by canal water, 250 hectares by tank water, 1,140 hectares by river lift irrigation, 160 hectares by deep tube wells, 2,360 hectares by shallow tube wells.

=== Dooars-Terai tea gardens ===
Tea gardens in the Dooars and Terai regions produce 226 million kg or over a quarter of India's total tea crop.. The Dooars-Terai tea is characterized by a bright, smooth and full-bodied liquor that's a wee bit lighter than Assam tea. Cultivation of tea in the Dooars was primarily pioneered and promoted by the British but there was significant contribution of Indian entrepreneurs.

=== Banking ===
In 2013-14, Falakata CD block had offices of 9 commercial banks and 4 gramin banks.

=== Backward Regions Grant Fund ===
The Jalpaiguri district is listed as a backward region and receives financial support from the Backward Regions Grant Fund. The fund, created by the Government of India, is designed to redress regional imbalances in development. As of 2012, 272 districts across the country were listed under this scheme. The list includes 11 districts of West Bengal.

== Transport ==
Falakata CD block has 7 originating/ terminating bus routes.

NH 31 passes through the block.

== Education ==
In 2013-14, Falakata CD block had 159 primary schools with 18,755 students, 9 middle schools with 1,921 students, 3 high school with 4,488 students and 18 higher secondary schools with 21,274 students. Falakata CD block had 1 general degree college with 4,488 students, 3 technical/ professional institutions with 556 students, 585 institutions for special and non-formal education with 37,057 students.

According to the 2011 census, in the Falakata CD block, among the 60 inhabited villages, all villages had schools, 54 villages had two or more primary schools, 32 villages had at least 1 primary and 1 middle school and 15 villages had at least 1 middle and 1 secondary school.

Lilabati Mahavidyalaya was established at Jateswar in 2013. Affiliated with the University of North Bengal, it offers courses in arts.

Falakata College was established at Falakata in 1981. Affiliated with the University of North Bengal, it offers courses in arts.

== Healthcare ==
In 2014, Falakata CD block had 1 rural hospital and 1 super speciality hospital, 2 primary health centres and 2 NGO/ private nursing home with total 70 beds and 13 doctors (excluding private bodies). It had 44 family welfare subcentres. 10,532 patients were treated indoor and 183,424 patients were treated outdoor in the hospitals, health centres and subcentres of the CD block.

Falakata Rural Hospital, with 30 beds at Falakata, is the major government medical facility in the Falakata CD block. There are primary health centres at Chhoto Salkumar (with 4 beds), Jateswar (with 6 beds).

Falakata Superspeciality Hospital, with 100 beds, is functional.
