= Alipurduar subdivision =

Alipurduar subdivision <optional>
- only Subdivision
- Interactive map of Alipurduar subdivision
- Coordinates: 26.489°N 89.527°E
- Country: India
- State: West Bengal
- District: Alipurduar
- Headquarters: Alipurduar

Languages
  - Official: Bengali, English
- Time zone: UTC+5:30 (IST)
- Website: http://alipurduar.gov.in/

Alipurduar subdivision is the only administrative division of the Alipurduar district in the Indian state of West Bengal.

== Geography ==
=== Subdivisions ===
Alipurduar district is divided into the following administrative subdivisions:

Subdivision	Headquarters	Area km^{2}	Population (2011)	Rural Population % (2011)	Urban Population % (2011)
Alipurduar	Alipurduar	2,667.28	1,491,250	79.38	20.62
Alipurduar district	Alipurduar	2,667.28	1,491.250	79.38	20.62

Places and tea estates in the western portion of Alipurdar subdivision (including Madarihat-Birpara, Falakata and Alipuduar I CD blocks) in Alipurduar district
CT: census town, R: rural/ urban centre, N: neighbourhood, NP: national park/ wildlife sanctuary, TE: tea estate
Abbreviations used in names – TG for Tea Garden (town/village), TE for Tea Estate
Owing to space constraints in the small map, the actual locations in a larger map may vary slightly
Places and tea estates in the eastern portion of Alipurdar subdivision (including Kalchini, Kumargram and Alipuduar II CD blocks) in Alipurduar district
CT: census town, R: rural/ urban centre, N: neighbourhood, A: Air Force Station, NP: national park/ wildlife sanctuary, TE: tea estate, H: historical site
Abbreviations used in names – TG for Tea Garden (town/village), TE for Tea Estate
Owing to space constraints in the small map, the actual locations in a larger map may vary slightly

=== Administrative units ===
Alipurduar subdivision has 8 police stations, 6 community development blocks, 6 panchayat samitis, 66 gram panchayats, 338 mouzas, 337 inhabited villages, 1 municipality and 20 census towns. The municipality is: Alipurduar. The census towns are: Sisha Jumrha, Uttar Madarihat, Jaigaon, Mechiabasti, Uttar Satali, Uttar Latabari, Jagijhora Barabak, Jateswar, Parangarpar, Falakata, Paschim Jitpur, Chechakhata, Alipurduar Railway Junction, Bholar Dabri, Birpara, Samuktola, Sobhaganj, Laskarpara, Dakshin Rampur and Uttar Kamakhyaguri. The subdivision has its headquarters at the city of Alipurduar.

=== Police stations ===
Police stations in the Alipurduar subdivision have the following features and jurisdiction:

Police Station	Area covered km^{2}	Inter- national border	Inter-state border km	Municipal Town	CD block
Kumargram	n/a	n/a	n/a	-	Kumargram
Falakata	n/a	-	-	-	Falakata
Madarihat	n/a	n/a	-	-	Madarihat-Birpara
Birpara	n/a	-	-	-	Madarihat-Birpara
Kalchini	n/a	-	-	-	Kalchini
Jaigaon	n/a	n/a	-	-	Kalchini
Alipurduar	n/a	-	-	Alipurduar	Alipurduar I
Samuktala	n/a	-	-	-	Alipurduar II

== Gram panchayats ==
The subdivision contains 66 gram panchayats under 6 community development blocks:

- Madarihat Birpara block consists of ten gram panchayats, viz. Bandapani, Hantapara, Madarihat, Totopara Ballalguri, Birpara–I, Khayarbari, Rangalibajna, Birpara–II, Lankapara and Shishujhumra.
- Alipurduar I block consists of 11 gram panchayats, viz. Banchukamari, Parorpar, Shalkumar–I, Vivekananda–I, Chakowakheti, Patlakhawa, Shalkumar–II, Vivekananda–II, Mathura, Purba Kanthalbari and Tapsikhata.
- Alipurduar II block consists of 11 gram panchayats, viz. Chaporer Par–I, Mahakalguri, Samuktala, Turturi, Chaparerpar–II, Majherdabri, Tatpara–I, Bhatibari, Kohinoor, Parokata and Tatpara–II.
- Falakata block consists of 12 gram panchayats, viz. Dalgaon, Dhanirampur–II, Guabarnagar, Mairadanga, Deogaon, Falakata–I, Jateswar–I, Parangerpar, Dhanirampur–I, Falakata–II, Jateswar–II and Shalkumar.
- Kalchini block consists of 11 gram panchayats, viz. Jaigaon–I, Jaigaon–II, Dalshing Para, Malangi, Satali, Mendabari, Latabari, Chuapara, Kalchini, Garopara and Rajabhatkawa.
- Kumargram block consists of 11 gram panchayats, viz. Chengamari, Khoardanga–I, Newland Kumargram Sankos, Turturikhanda, Kamakhyaguri–I, Khoardanga–II, Valka Barabisa–I, Kamakhyaguri–II, Kumargram, Raidak and Valka Barabisa–II.

=== Blocks ===
Community development blocks in the Alipurduar subdivision are:

CD block	Headquarters	Area km^{2}	Population (2011)	SC %	ST %	Literacy rate %	Census Towns
Kumargram	Kumargram	517.68	199,609	35.78	30.00	72.48	3
Falakata	Falakata	353.93	290,722	40.69	15.92	72.74	4
Madarihat-Birpara	Madarihat	376.75	202,026	14.26	38.76	67.77	2
Kalchini	Kalchini	711.61	298,458	10.10	40.30	68.96	4
Alipurduar I	Pachkalguri	378.59	216,931	48.41	16.87	76.19	5
Alipurduar II	Jashodanga	318.92	218,272	41.81	18.44	75.76	2

== Education ==
Given in the table below is a comprehensive picture of the education scenario in Alipurduar subdivision/ Alipurduar district, with data for the year 2013-14.

Subdivision	Primary School		Middle School		High School		Higher Secondary School		General College, Univ		Technical / Professional Instt		Non-formal Education	
Subdivision	Institution	Student	Institution	Student	Institution	Student	Institution	Student	Institution	Student	Institution	Student	Institution	Student
Alipurduar	833	89,978	56	11,372	34	36,234	97	127,257	7	22,478	18	3,937	3,709	179,753

=== Educational institutions ===
The following institutions are located in the Alipuduar subdivision:

- Alipurduar University was established in 2018 at Alipurduar.
- Alipurduar College was established in 1957. Affiliated with the University of North Bengal, it offers courses in arts, science and commerce.
- Alipurduar Mahila Mahavidyalaya was established in 2007. Affiliated with the University of North Bengal, it offers courses in arts.
- Vivekanada College was established at Alipurduar in 1985. Affiliated with the University of North Bengal, it offers courses in arts and science.
- Lilabati Mahavidyalaya was established at Jateswar in 2013. Affiliated with the University of North Bengal, it offers courses in arts.
- Falakata College was established at Falakata in 1981. Affiliated with the University of North Bengal, it offers courses in arts.
- Saheed Kshudiram College was established at Kamakhyaguri in 1996. Affiliated with the University of North Bengal, it offers courses in arts and science.
- Nani Bhattacharya Smarak Mahavidyalaya was established in 2000 at Mangalbari, PO Jaigaon. Affiliated with the University of North Bengal, it offers courses in arts.
- Pijushkanti Mukherjee Mahavidyalaya was established at Sonapur in 2015. Affiliated with the University of North Bengal, it offers courses in arts.
- Birpara College was established at Birpara in 1986. Affiliated with the University of North Bengal, it offers courses in arts and commerce.
- Samuktala Sidhu Kanhu College was established at Samuktala in 2010. Affiliated with the University of North Bengal, it offers courses in arts.

== Healthcare ==
The table below (all data in numbers) presents an overview of the medical facilities available and patients treated in the hospitals, health centres and sub-centres in Alipurduar subdivision/ district, with data for the year 2012-13:

Subdivision	Health & Family Welfare Deptt, WB				Other State Govt Deptts	Local bodies	Central Govt Deptts / PSUs	NGO / Private Nursing Homes	Total	Total Number of Beds	Total Number of Doctors*	Indoor Patients	Outdoor Patients
Subdivision	Hospitals	Rural Hospitals	Block Primary Health Centres	Primary Health Centres	Other State Govt Deptts	Local bodies	Central Govt Deptts / PSUs	NGO / Private Nursing Homes	Total	Total Number of Beds	Total Number of Doctors*	Indoor Patients	Outdoor Patients
Alipurduar	2	7	-	13	1	-	2	15	40	1,090	133	118,881	1,269,285

.* Excluding nursing homes.

=== Medical facilities ===
Medical facilities in the Alipurduar subdivision are as follows:

Hospitals: (Name, location, beds)

- Alipurduar Subdivisional Hospital, Alipurduar M, 250 beds
- Alipurduar Jail Hospital, Alipurduar, 9 beds
- Alipurduar Railway Hospital, Alipurduar, 111 beds
- Birpara State General Hospital, Birpara, 100 beds
- Rajabhatkhawa Railway Hospital, Rajabhatkhawa, Kalchini CD block, 2 beds

Rural Hospitals: (Name, CD block, location, beds)

- Falakata Rural Hospital, Falakata CD block, Falakata, 30 beds
- Kamakhyaguri Rural Hospital, Kumargram CD block, Kamakhyaguri, 30 beds
- Madarihat Rural Hospital, Madarihat-Birpara CD block, Madarihat, 30 beds
- Uttarlatabari Rural Hospital, Kalchini CD block, Kalchini, 30 beds
- Pachkalguri Rural Hospital, Alipurduar I CD block, Pachkalguri, 30 beds
- Jasodanga Rural Hospital, Alipurduar II CD block, Jashodanga, 30 beds
- Bhatibari Rural Hospital, Alipurduar II CD block, Bhatibari, 20 beds

Primary Health Centres : (CD block-wise)(CD block, PHC location, beds)

- Kumargram CD block: Kumargram (6), Barabisa (PO Kumargram) (6).
- Falakata CD block: Chhoto Salkumar (4), Jateswar (6).
- Madarihat CD block: Madhyarangali Bazar (PO Gopal Bagan) (10), Sishujhuara (PO Sishubarihat) (6), Totopara (10).
- Kalchini CD block: Satali (PO Satali Mondalpur) (4), Jaigaon (?)
- Alipurduar I CD block: Munshipara (PO Salkumarhat) (4), Silbarihat (10).
- Alipurduar II CD block: Samuktala (10), Turturi (4).
