= Samuktala =

- Census Town
- Location in West Bengal, India Samuktala (India)
- Coordinates: 26.5436°N 89.6834°E
- Country: India
- State: West Bengal
- District: Alipurduar

Population (2011)
  - Total: 8,132
- Time zone: UTC+5:30 (IST)
- PIN: 736206
- Telephone/STD code: 03564
- Vehicle registration: WB
- Lok Sabha constituency: Alipurduars
- Vidhan Sabha constituency: Kumargram
- Website: alipurduar.gov.in

Samuktala (also spelled Samuktola, Shamuktala) is a census town and a gram panchayat in the Alipurduar II CD block in the Alipurduar subdivision of the Alipurduar district in the Indian state of West Bengal.

== Geography ==
Places and tea estates in the eastern portion of Alipurdar subdivision (including Kalchini, Kumargram and Alipuduar II CD blocks) in Alipurduar district
CT: census town, R: rural/ urban centre, N: neighbourhood, A: Air Force Station, NP: national park/ wildlife sanctuary, TE: tea estate, H: historical site
Abbreviations used in names – TG for Tea Garden (town/village), TE for Tea Estate
Owing to space constraints in the small map, the actual locations in a larger map may vary slightly

=== Location ===
Samuktala is located at 26.5436°N 89.6834°E.

=== Area overview ===
Alipurduar district is covered by two maps. It is an extensive area in the eastern end of the Dooars in West Bengal. It is undulating country, largely forested, with numerous rivers flowing down from the outer ranges of the Himalayas in Bhutan. It is a predominantly rural area with 79.38% of the population living in the rural areas. The district has 1 municipal town and 20 census towns and that means that 20.62% of the population lives in the urban areas. The scheduled castes and scheduled tribes, taken together, form more than half the population in all the six community development blocks in the district. There is a high concentration of tribal people (scheduled tribes) in the three northern blocks of the district.

Note: The map alongside presents some of the notable locations in the subdivision. All places marked in the map are linked in the larger full screen map.

== Civic administration ==
=== Police station ===
There is a police station at Samuktala. It has jurisdiction over Alipurduar II CD block.

== Demographics ==
According to the 2011 Census of India, Samuktola had a total population of 8,132 of which 4,169 (51%) were males and 3,963 (49%) were females. There were 876 persons in the age range of 0 to 6 years. The total number of literate people in Samuktola was 5,971 (82.29% of the population over 6 years).

== Infrastructure ==
According to the District Census Handbook 2011, Jalpaiguri, Samuktola covered an area of 3.6242 km^{2}. Among the civic amenities, the protected water supply involved hand pumps. It had 745 domestic electric connections. Among the medical facilities it had 5 medicine shops. Among the educational facilities it had 4 primary schools, 3 middle schools, 3 secondary schools, 3 senior secondary schools, the nearest general degree college at Alipurduar 2 km away. It had the offices of 1 nationalised bank, 1 cooperative bank.

== Education ==
Samuktala Sidhu Kanhu College was established in 2010. Affiliated with the University of North Bengal it offers a honours course in Bengali and a general course in arts.

== Healthcare ==
There is a primary health centre with 10 beds at Samuktala.
