= Chechakhata =

- Census Town
- Location in West Bengal, India Chechakhata (India)
- Coordinates: 26.54°N 89.54°E
- Country: India
- State: West Bengal
- District: Alipurduar

Area
  - Total: 1.44 km^{2} (0.56 sq mi)

Population (2011)
  - Total: 7,613
  - Density: 5,290/km^{2} (13,700/sq mi)
- Time zone: UTC+5:30 (IST)
- PIN: 736123
- Vehicle registration: WB
- Lok Sabha constituency: Alipurduars (ST)
- Vidhan Sabha constituency: Alipurduars (ST)
- Website: alipuduar.gov.in

Chechakhata is a census town in the Alipurduar I CD block in the Alipurduar subdivision of the Alipurduar district in the state of West Bengal, India.

== Geography ==
Places and tea estates in the western portion of Alipurdar subdivision (including Madarihat-Birpara, Falakata and Alipuduar I CD blocks) in Alipurduar district
CT: census town, R: rural/ urban centre, N: neighbourhood, NP: national park/ wildlife sanctuary, TE: tea estate
Abbreviations used in names – TG for Tea Garden (town/village), TE for Tea Estate
Owing to space constraints in the small map, the actual locations in a larger map may vary slightly

=== Location ===
Chechakhata is a census town of Alipurduar. Chechakhata is situated from Alipurduar main city about 3.5 km.

=== Area overview ===
Alipurduar district is covered by two maps. It is an extensive area in the eastern end of the Dooars in West Bengal. It is undulating country, largely forested, with numerous rivers flowing down from the outer ranges of the Himalayas in Bhutan. It is a predominantly rural area with 79.38% of the population living in the urban areas. The district has 1 municipal town and 20 census towns and that means that 20.62% of the population lives in rural areas. The scheduled castes and scheduled tribes, taken together, form more than half the population in all the six community development blocks in the district. There is a high concentration of tribal people (scheduled tribes) in the three northern blocks of the district.

Note: The map alongside presents some of the notable locations in the subdivision. All places marked in the map are linked in the larger full screen map.

== Demographics ==
According to the 2011 Census of India, Chechakata had a total population of 7,613 of which 3,870 (51%) were males and 3,743 (49%) were females. There were 586 persons in the age range of 0 to 6 years. The total number of literate people in Chechakata was 6,392 (90.54% of the population over 6 years).

As of 2001 India census, Chechakhata had a population of 6847. Males constitute 54% of the population and females 46%. Chechakhata has an average literacy rate of 84%, higher than the national average of 59.5%; with male literacy of 88% and female literacy of 79%. 8% of the population is under 6 years of age.

== Infrastructure ==
According to the District Census Handbook 2011, Jalpaiguri, Chechakhata covered an area of 1.44 km^{2}. Among the civic amenities, it had 35 km roads, with open drains, the protected water supply involved tap water from treated sources, borewell, tubewell. It had 2,256 domestic electric connections. Among the medical facilities it had 2 dispensaries/ health centres. Among the educational facilities it had 4 primary schools, 1 middle school, 1 secondary school.
