= Parangarpar =

- Census Town
- Location in West Bengal, India Parangarpar (India)
- Coordinates: 26.5437°N 89.1945°E
- Country: India
- State: West Bengal
- District: Alipurduar

Area
  - Total: 5.7041 km^{2} (2.2024 sq mi)

Population (2011)
  - Total: 11,408
  - Density: 2,000.0/km^{2} (5,179.9/sq mi)
- Time zone: UTC+5:30 (IST)
- PIN: 735211
- Telephone/STD code: 03563
- Vehicle registration: WB
- Lok Sabha constituency: Alipurduars
- Vidhan Sabha constituency: Falakata
- Website: alipurduar.gov.in

Parangarpar is a census town in the Falakata CD block in the Alipurduar subdivision of the Alipurduar district in the state of West Bengal, India.

== Geography ==
Places and tea estates in the western portion of Alipurdar subdivision (including Madarihat-Birpara, Falakata and Alipuduar I CD blocks) in Alipurduar district
CT: census town, R: rural/ urban centre, N: neighbourhood, NP: national park/ wildlife sanctuary, TE: tea estate
Abbreviations used in names – TG for Tea Garden (town/village), TE for Tea Estate
Owing to space constraints in the small map, the actual locations in a larger map may vary slightly

=== Location ===
Parangarpar is located at 26.5437°N 89.1945°E.

=== Area overview ===
Alipurduar district is covered by two maps. It is an extensive area in the eastern end of the Dooars in West Bengal. It is undulating country, largely forested, with numerous rivers flowing down from the outer ranges of the Himalayas in Bhutan. It is a predominantly rural area with 79.38% of the population living in the rural areas. The district has 1 municipal town and 20 census towns and that means that 20.62% of the population lives in urban areas. The scheduled castes and scheduled tribes, taken together, form more than half the population in all the six community development blocks in the district. There is a high concentration of tribal people (scheduled tribes) in the three northern blocks of the district.

Note: The map alongside presents some of the notable locations in the subdivision. All places marked in the map are linked in the larger full screen map.

== Demographics ==
As per the 2011 Census of India, Parangarpar had a total population of 11,408. There were 5,930 (52%) males and 5,478 (48%) females. There were 1,084 persons in the age range of 0 to 6 years. The total number of literate people in Parangarpar was 8.750 (84.75% of the population over 6 years).

== Infrastructure ==
According to the District Census Handbook 2011, Jalpaiguri, Parangarpar covered an area of 5.7041 km^{2}. Among the civic amenities, it had 23 km roads, with open drains, the protected water supply involved tap water from treated sources, uncovered wells. It had 1,661 domestic electric connections, 175 road lighting points. Among the medical facilities it had 1 dispensary/ health centre, 1 family welfare centre, 1 maternity and child welfare centre, 1 maternity home, 1 veterinary hospital, 10 medicine shops. Among the educational facilities it had 7 primary schools, 3 middle schools, 2 secondary schools, 2 senior secondary schools. It had 1 recognised shorthand, typewriting and vocational training centre, 5 non-formal education centres (Sarva Shiksha Abhiyan), 1 orphanage home. Three important commodities it produced were: ply wood, wooden furniture, jute choir. It had branches of 1 nationalised bank, 2 cooperative banks.
