= Kalchini, Alipurduar =

Kalchini
- Neighbourhood
- Location in West Bengal, India Kalchini (India)
- Coordinates: 26.700778°N 89.449667°E
- Country: India
- State: West Bengal
- District: Alipurduar
- Time zone: UTC+5:30 (IST)
- PIN: 735217
- Telephone/STD code: 03566
- Vehicle registration: WB
- Lok Sabha constituency: Alipurduars
- Vidhan Sabha constituency: Kalchini
- Website: alipurduar.gov.in

Kalchini is a neighbourhood in the Kalchini CD block in the Alipurduar subdivision of the Alipurduar district in the state of West Bengal, India.

== Geography ==
Places and tea estates in the eastern portion of Alipurdar subdivision (including Kalchini, Kumargram and Alipuduar II CD blocks) in Alipurduar district
CT: census town, R: rural/ urban centre, N: neighbourhood, A: Air Force Station, NP: national park/ wildlife sanctuary, TE: tea estate, H: historical site
Abbreviations used in names – TG for Tea Garden (town/village), TE for Tea Estate
Owing to space constraints in the small map, the actual locations in a larger map may vary slightly

=== Location ===
Kalchini is located at 26.700778°N 89.449667°E.

According to the map of the Kalchini CD block on page 217 in the District Census Handbook, Jalpaiguri, 2011 census, Kalchini (Hamiltonganj) police station and CD block headquarters are shown as being a part of Uttar Latabari census town/ mouza.

=== Area overview ===
Alipurduar district is covered by two maps. It is an extensive area in the eastern end of the Dooars in West Bengal. It is undulating country, largely forested, with numerous rivers flowing down from the outer ranges of the Himalayas in Bhutan. It is a predominantly rural area with 79.38% of the population living in the rural areas. The district has 1 municipal town and 20 census towns and that means that 20.62% of the population lives in the urban areas. The scheduled castes and scheduled tribes together form more than half the population in all the six community development blocks in the district. There is high concentration of tribal people (scheduled tribes) in the three northern blocks of the district.

Note: The map alongside presents some of the notable locations in the subdivision. All places marked in the map are linked in the larger full screen map.

== Civic administration ==
=== Police station ===
Kalchini police station has jurisdiction over part of the Kalchini CD block.

=== CD block HQ ===
Headquarters of Kalchini CD block is at Kalchini.

== Economy ==
According to the Study of Labour Condition in Tea Gardens of New Jalpaiguri carried out by the Indian Institute of Management, Calcutta, the plantations of North Bengal (Dooars area) produce just average tea and do not have the brand value of Darjeeling tea or Assam tea. Around 2002-2004 the industry faced a crisis and at least 22 plantations were closed down in Jalpaiguri district, affecting 21,000 permanent workers and impacting a much larger population. Kalchini block has 18 tea gardens, mostly in bad shape and some closed.

== Transport ==
There are stations at Kalchini and Hamiltonganj on the New Jalpaiguri-Alipurduar-Samuktala Road line.

== Healthcare ==
Uttarlatabari Rural Hospital, with 30 beds at Kalchini, is the major government medical facility in the Kalchini CD block.
