= Alipurduar Railway Junction =

Alipurduar Junction Railway Station
- Census Town
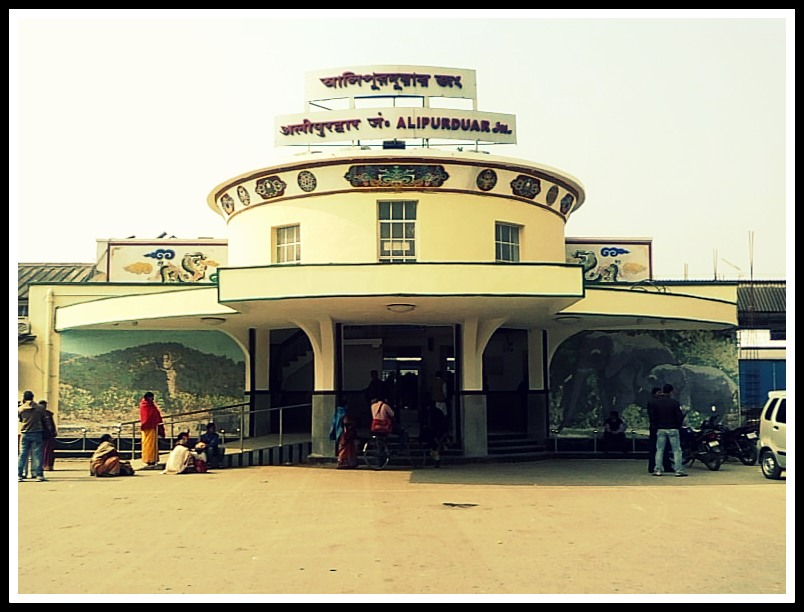

- Location in West Bengal, India Alipurduar Junction Railway Station (India)
- Coordinates: 26.525342°N 89.543589°E
- Country: India
- State: West Bengal
- District: Alipurduar

Area
  - Total: 7.2 km^{2} (2.8 sq mi)

Population (2011)
  - Total: 10,733
  - Density: 1,500/km^{2} (3,900/sq mi)
- Time zone: UTC+5:30 (IST)
- Vehicle registration: WB
- Lok Sabha constituency: Alipurduars (ST)
- Vidhan Sabha constituency: Alipurduars
- Website: www.alipurduar.org

Alipurduar Junction is a census town in the Alipurduar I CD block in the Alipurduar subdivision of the Alipurduar district in the state of West Bengal, India.

== Geography ==
Places and tea estates in the western portion of Alipurdar subdivision (including Madarihat-Birpara, Falakata and Alipuduar I CD blocks) in Alipurduar district
CT: census town, R: rural/ urban centre, N: neighbourhood, NP: national park/ wildlife sanctuary, TE: tea estate
Abbreviations used in names – TG for Tea Garden (town/village), TE for Tea Estate
Owing to space constraints in the small map, the actual locations in a larger map may vary slightly

=== Location ===
Alipuduar Railway Junction is located at 26.525342°N 89.543589°E.

=== Area overview ===
Alipurduar district is covered by two maps. It is an extensive area in the eastern end of the Dooars in West Bengal. It is undulating country, largely forested, with numerous rivers flowing down from the outer ranges of the Himalayas in Bhutan. It is a predominantly rural area with 79.38% of the population living in the urban areas. The district has 1 municipal town and 20 census towns; 20.62% of the population lives in rural areas. The scheduled castes and scheduled tribes, taken together, form more than half the population in all the six community development blocks in the district. There is a high concentration of tribal people (scheduled tribes) in the three northern blocks of the district.

Note: The map alongside presents some of the notable locations in the subdivision. All places marked in the map are linked in the larger full screen map.

== Demographics ==
According to the 2011 Census of India, Alipurduar Railway Junction had a total population of 10,733 of which 5,370 (50%) were males and 5,363 (50%) were females. There were 902 persons in the age range of 0 to 6 years. The total number of literate people in Alipurduar Railway Junction was 8,755 (89.06% of the population over 6 years).

As of 2001 India census, Alipurduar Jnc. had a population of 15,895. Males constitute 51% of the population and females 49%. Alipurduar Rly.Jnc. has an average literacy rate of 80%, higher than the national average of 59.5%; with 54% of the males and 46% of females literate. 8% of the population is under 6 years of age.

=== Languages ===
Languages spoken in Alipurduar Railway junction (2011)
1. Bengali (63.2%)
2. Hindi (24.8%)
3. Telugu (3.90%)
4. Bhojpuri (2.64%)
5. Nepali (1.50%)
6. Others (3.96%)

== Infrastructure ==
According to the District Census Handbook 2011, Jalpaiguri, Alipurduar Railway Junction covered an area of 7.2 km^{2}. Among the civic amenities, it had 18 km roads, with both closed and open drains, the protected water supply involved service reservoir, tank, pond, lake, tubewell, borewell. It had 2,000 domestic electric connections, 500 road lighting points. Among the medical facilities it had 1 hospital, 22 medicine shops. Among the educational facilities it had 4 primary schools, 1 middle school, 1 secondary school, the nearest general degree college at Alipurduar 2.5 km away. It had 1 special school for the disabled. Among the social, recreational, cultural facilities it had 2 stadiums, 1 auditorium/ community hall, 1 public library, 1 reading room. It has the branch office of 1 nationalised bank.
