= Alipurduar II =

- Community development block
- Interactive map of Alipurduar II
- Coordinates: 26.48°N 89.54°E
- Country: India
- State: West Bengal
- District: Alipurduar

Government
  - Type: Representative democracy

Area
  - Total: 318.92 km^{2} (123.14 sq mi)

Population (2011)
  - Total: 218,272
  - Density: 684.41/km^{2} (1,772.6/sq mi)

Languages
  - Official: Bengali, English
- Time zone: UTC+5:30 (IST)
- ISO 3166 code: IN-WB
- Lok Sabha constituency: Alipurduars
- Vidhan Sabha constituency: Alipurduars, Kumargram, Kalchini
- Website: www.alipurduar.gov.in

Alipurduar II is a community development block (CD block) that forms an administrative division in the Alipurduar subdivision of the Alipurduar district in the Indian state of West Bengal.

== Geography ==
Sobhaganj is located at 26°29′N 89°32′E.

The Alipurduar II CD block lies in the south-central part of the district. The Chiklajhord River flows along a portion of the eastern boundary of the CD block. It has hilly terrain which is part of the sub-Himalayan ranges.

The Alipurduar II is bounded by the Kalchini and Kumargram CD blocks on the north, Kumargram CD block on the east, Tufanganj I and Tufanganj II CD blocks in Cooch Behar district on the south and Alipurduar I CD block on the west.

The Alipurduar II CD block has an area of 318.92 km^{2}. It has 1 panchayat samity, 11 gram panchayats, 161 gram sansads (village councils), 79 mouzas, 78 inhabited villages and 2 census towns. Samuktala police station serves this block. Headquarters of this CD block is at Jashodanga.

Gram panchayats of Alipurduar II block/ panchayat samiti are: Bhatibari, Chaporerpar I, Chaporerpar II, Kohinoor, Mahakalguri, Majherdabri, Parokata, Shamuktala, Tatpara I, Tatpara II and Turturi.

== Demographics ==
=== Population ===
According to the 2011 Census of India, the Alipurduar II CD block had a population of 218,272, of which 204,652 were rural, and 13,620 were urban. There were 112,434 (52%) males and 105,838 (48%) females. There were 25,067 persons in the age range of 0 to 6 years. The Scheduled Castes numbered 91,253 (41.81%) and the Scheduled Tribes numbered 40,245 (18.44%).

According to the 2001 census, Alipurduar II block had a total population of 196,909, out of which 101,515 were males and 95,394 were females. Alipurduar II block registered a population growth of 15.80 per cent during the 1991-2001 decade.

Census towns in the Alipurduar II CD block are (2011 census figures in brackets): Samuktola (8,132) and Sobhaganj (5,488).

Large villages (with 4,000+ population) in the Alipurduar II CD block are (2011 census figures in brackets): Chaprapar (4,018), Dakshin Panialguri (4,677), Chandijhar (4,615), Paschim Barachouki (4,566), Salsabari (4,682), Jashodanga (4,068), Tatpara (4,409), Kumarijan (4,164), Purba Chikliguri (4,999), Kohinur Tea Garden (8,822), Uttar Parokata (5,799) and Dakshin Parokata (4,457).

Other villages in the Alipurduar II CD block include (2011 census figures in brackets): Bhatibari (2,642), Mahakalguri (1,917) and Turturi (2,057).

=== Literacy ===
According to the 2011 census, the total number of literate persons in the Alipurduar II CD block was 146,380 (75.76% of the population over 6 years) out of which males numbered 81,044 (81.48% of the male population over 6 years) and females numbered 65,511 (69.96% of the female population over 6 years). The gender disparity (the difference between female and male literacy rates) was 11.77%.

See also – List of West Bengal districts ranked by literacy rate

Literacy in CD blocks of
Jalpaiguri district
Jalpaiguri Sadar subdivision
Rajganj – 62.82%
Jalpaiguri – 73.81%
Maynaguri – 75.63%
Dhupguri – 60.57%
Malbazar subdivision
Mal – 66.31
Matiali – 66.98%
Nagrakata – 61.27%
Alipurduar subdivision
Madarihat-Birpara – 67.77%
Kalchini – 68.96%
Kumargram – 72.42%
Alipurduar I – 78.19%
Alipurduar II – 75.76%
Falakata – 72.64%
2011 Census: CD Block Wise

Primary Census Abstract Data

=== Language and religion ===
Religion in Alipurduar II CD block (2011)
Hinduism	84.40%
Christianity	8.64%
Islam	6.50%
Other or not stated	0.46%

In the 2011 Census of India, Hindus numbered 184,232 and formed 84.40% of the population of Alipurduar II CD block. Christians numbered 18.851 and formed 8.64% of the population. Muslims numbered 14,185 and formed 6.50% of the population. Others numbered 1,004 and formed 0.46% of the population. Others include Addi Bassi, Marang Boro, Santal, Saranath, Sari Dharma, Sarna, Alchchi, Bidin, Sant, Saevdharm, Seran, Saran, Sarin, Kheria, and other religious communities.

Languages of Alipurduar II CD block (2011)
1. Bengali (73.9%)
2. Sadri (6.72%)
3. Santali (5.20%)
4. Kurukh (3.33%)
5. Rajbongshi (2.95%)
6. Boro (2.68%)
7. Hindi (1.18%)
8. 'Other' Bengali (1.08%)
9. Others (2.99%)

At the time of the 2011 census, 73.87% of the population spoke Bengali, 6.72% Sadri, 5.20% Santali, 3.33% Kurukh, 2.95% Rajbongshi, 2.68% Boro and 1.18% Hindi as their first language. 1.08% were recorded as speaking 'Other' under Bengali.

== Poverty level ==
Based on a study of the per capita consumption in rural and urban areas, using central sample data of NSS 55th Round 1999-2000, Jalpaiguri district was found to have relatively high rates of poverty of 35.73% in rural areas and 61.53% in the urban areas. It was one of the few districts where urban poverty rate was higher than the rural poverty rate.

According to a World Bank report, as of 2012, 26-31% of the population of Jalpaiguri, Bankura and Paschim Medinipur districts were below poverty line, a relatively high level of poverty in West Bengal, which had an average 20% of the population below poverty line.

== Economy ==
=== Livelihood ===
Livelihood
in Alipurduar II CD block
1. Cultivators (21.8%)
2. Agricultural labourers (37.7%)
3. Household industries (3.08%)
4. Other Workers (37.4%)

In the Alipurduar II CD block in 2011, among the class of total workers, cultivators numbered 18,842 and formed 21.84%, agricultural labourers numbered 32,502 and formed 37.67%, household industry workers numbered 2,658 and formed 3.08% and other workers numbered 32,274 and formed 37.41%. Total workers numbered 89,224 and formed 41.43% of the total population, and non-workers numbered 127,707 and formed 58.87% of the population.

Note: In the census records a person is considered a cultivator, if the person is engaged in cultivation/ supervision of land owned by self/government/institution. When a person who works on another person's land for wages in cash or kind or share, is regarded as an agricultural labourer. Household industry is defined as an industry conducted by one or more members of the family within the household or village, and one that does not qualify for registration as a factory under the Factories Act. Other workers are persons engaged in some economic activity other than cultivators, agricultural labourers and household workers. It includes factory, mining, plantation, transport and office workers, those engaged in business and commerce, teachers, entertainment artistes and so on.

=== Infrastructure ===
There are 78 inhabited villages in the Alipurduar II CD block, as per the District Census Handbook, Jalpaiguri, 2011. 100% villages have power supply. 100% villages have drinking water supply. 36 villages (46.15%) have post offices. 70 villages (89.74%) have telephones (including landlines, public call offices and mobile phones). 42 villages (53.85%) have pucca (paved) approach roads and 43 villages (55.13%) have transport communication (includes bus service, rail facility and navigable waterways). 5 villages (6.41%) have agricultural credit societies and 9 villages (11.54%) have banks.

=== Agriculture ===
The economy of the Jalpaiguri district is mainly dependent on agriculture and plantations, and majority of the people are engaged in agriculture. Jalpaiguri is well-known for tea and timber. Other important crops are paddy, jute, tobacco, mustard seeds, sugarcane and wheat. The annual average rainfall is 3,440 mm, around double of that of Kolkata and the surrounding areas. The area is flood prone and the rivers often change course causing immense damage to crops and cultivated lands.

In 2013-14, there were 104 fertiliser depots, 49 seed stores and 69 fair price shops in the Alipurduar II CD block.

In 2013–14, the Alipurduar II CD block produced 4,192 tonnes of Aman paddy, the main winter crop, from 2,151 hectares, 1,986 tonnes of Boro paddy (spring crop) from 982 hectares, 6,405 tonnes of Aus paddy (summer crop) from 3,938 hectares, 5,414 tonnes of wheat from 2,095 hectares, 2,338 tonnes of maize from 300 hectares, 37,740 tonnes of jute from 2,788 hectares and 32,562 tonnes of potatoes from 1,409 hectares. It also produced pulses and oilseeds.

In 2013-14, the total area irrigated in the Alipurduar II CD block was 4,960 hectares, out of which 1,590 hectares were irrigated by canal water, 176 hectares by tank water, 1,340 hectares by river lift irrigation, 40 hectares by deep tube wells, 1,730 hectares by shallow tube wells, 84 hectares by open dug wells.

=== Dooars-Terai tea gardens ===
Tea gardens in the Dooars and Terai regions produce 226 million kg or over a quarter of India's total tea crop.. The Dooars-Terai tea is characterized by a bright, smooth and full-bodied liquor that's a wee bit lighter than Assam tea. Cultivation of tea in the Dooars was primarily pioneered and promoted by the British but there was significant contribution of Indian entrepreneurs.

=== Banking ===
In 2013-14, Alipurduar II CD block had offices of 9 commercial banks and 1 gramin bank.

=== Backward Regions Grant Fund ===
The Jalpaiguri district is listed as a backward region and receives financial support from the Backward Regions Grant Fund. The fund, created by the Government of India, is designed to redress regional imbalances in development. As of 2012, 272 districts across the country were listed under this scheme. The list includes 11 districts of West Bengal.

== Transport ==
Alipurduar II CD block has 3 ferry services and 3 originating/ terminating bus routes.

NH 317 passes through the block.

== Education ==
In 2013-14, Alipurduar II CD block had 165 primary schools with 15,572 students, 8 middle schools with 1,229 students, 6 high school with 6,441 students and 15 higher secondary schools with 18,997 students. Alipurduar II CD block had 1 technical/ professional institution with 196 students, 458 institutions for special and non-formal education with 25,689 students. Alipurduar municipal area (located outside the CD block area) had 2 general degree colleges with 4,862 students.

See also – Education in India

According to the 2011 census, in the Alipurduar II CD block, among the 78 inhabited villages, 1 village did not have a school, 62 villages had two or more primary schools, 36 villages had at least 1 primary and 1 middle school and 20 villages had at least 1 middle and 1 secondary school.

Samuktala Sidhu Kanhu College was established at Samuktala in 2010. Affiliated with the University of North Bengal, it offers courses in arts.

== Healthcare ==
In 2014, Alipurduar II CD block had 2 rural hospitals, 2 primary health centres and 2 NGO/ private nursing homes with total 105 beds and 13 doctors (excluding private bodies). It had 36 family welfare subcentres. 5,657 patients were treated indoor and 183,027 patients were treated outdoor in the hospitals, health centres and subcentres of the CD block.

Jasodanga Rural Hospital, with 30 beds at Jashodanga, is the major government medical facility in the Alipurduar II CD block. Bhatibari Rural Hospital functions with 20 beds. There are primary health centres at Samuktala (with 10 beds), Turturi (with 4 beds).
