= Falakata =

- Municipality
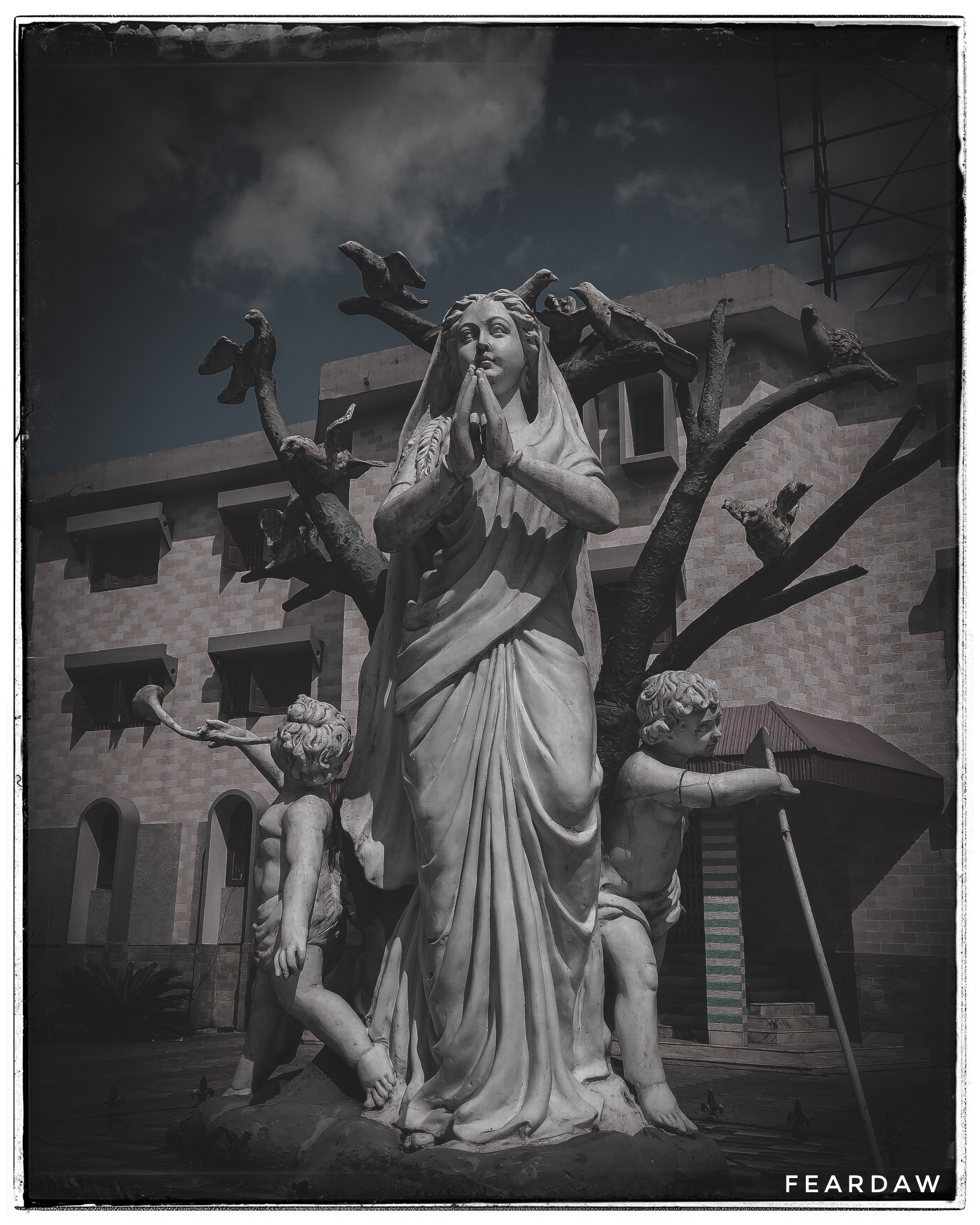
- Statue in Falakata Community Hall

- Location in West Bengal, India Falakata (India)
- Coordinates: 26.53°N 89.2°E
- Country: India
- State: West Bengal
- District: Alipurduar

Government
  - Type: Municipality
  - Body: Falakata Municipality
  - Chairman: Pradip Muhuri (AITC)
  - Vice-Chairman: Ruma Ray Sarkar (AITC)
  - Lok Sabha MP: Manoj Tigga (BJP)
  - MLA: Dipak Barman (BJP)

Area
  - Total: 67.73 km^{2} (26.15 sq mi)
- Elevation: 88 m (289 ft)

Population (2011)
  - Total: 55,039
  - Density: 812/km^{2} (2,100/sq mi)

Languages
  - Official: Bengali, English
- Time zone: UTC+5:30 (IST)
- Lok Sabha: Alipurduars
- Vidhan Sabha: Falakata
- Website: falakatamunicipality.in

Falakata is a city and a municipality near Jaldhaka River in the Alipurduar subdivision of the Alipurduar district in the Indian state of West Bengal.

== Civic administration ==
Falakata is governed mainly by Falakata municipality. Falakata Municipality covers Falakata-I & II panchayats and parts of Parengerpar and Guabarnagar panchayats of Falakata block.

=== Police station ===
Falakata police has jurisdiction over Falakata CD block.

=== CD block HQ ===
Headquarters of Falakata CD block is at Falakata.

== Demographics ==
As per 2011 Census of India, Falakata had a population of 19716 of which 10,022 are males while 9,694 are females. Males constitute 51% of the population and females 49%. Falakata has an average literacy rate of 86.01%, higher than the national average of 59.5%: male literacy is 89.48%, and female literacy is 82.42%. In Falakata, 12% of the population is under 6 years of age.

In 2021, Falakata municipality was formed covering Falakata-I & II panchayats and parts of Parengerpar and Guabarnagar panchayats of Falakata block. The population of the newly formed municipality was 55,039.

=== Languages ===
Languages spoken in Falakata Town (2011)
1. Bengali (93.9%)
2. Hindi (4.86%)
3. Bhojpuri (0.29%)
4. Others (0.58%)

== Geography ==
Places and tea estates in the western portion of Alipurdar subdivision (including Madarihat-Birpara, Falakata and Alipuduar I CD blocks) in Alipurduar district
CT: census town, R: rural/ urban centre, N: neighbourhood, NP: national park/ wildlife sanctuary, TE: tea estate
Abbreviations used in names – TG for Tea Garden (town/village), TE for Tea Estate
Owing to space constraints in the small map, the actual locations in a larger map may vary slightly

=== Location ===
Falakata is located at 26.53°N 89.2°E It has an average elevation of 88 metres (288 feet). Mujnai is the main river. Falakata is surrounded by rich forests, corn fields and the nearby Kunjanagar Eco-Park.

=== Area overview ===
Alipurduar district is covered by two maps. It is an extensive area in the eastern end of the Dooars in West Bengal. It is undulating country, largely forested, with numerous rivers flowing down from the outer ranges of the Himalayas in Bhutan. It is a predominantly rural area with 79.38% of the population living in the rural areas. The district has 1 municipal town and 20 census towns and that means that 20.62% of the population lives in urban areas. The scheduled castes and scheduled tribes, taken together, form more than half the population in all the six community development blocks in the district. There is a high concentration of tribal people (scheduled tribes) in the three northern blocks of the district.

Note: The map alongside presents some of the notable locations in the subdivision. All places marked in the map are linked in the larger full screen map.

== Education ==
Falakata College is an arts college. There is a government Polytechnic College at Baganbari, Falakata. Falakata High School is the oldest school of Falakata, nearly 2500 students studies every year, offering science, commerce, and arts streams at 10+2 levels. Falakata Girls' High School, Parangerpar Shishu Kalyan High School, Falakata Subhash Girls' High School, Jadav Pally High School are the other school in Falakata Town. All schools are recognised by West Bengal State Board (WBBSE/WBCHSE). Raymond Memorial Higher Secondary School is an English medium, Christian minority school, with almost 2,200 students, run by the Seventh-day Adventist Church since 1949. It is a co-educational day-boarding school with classes from nursery to 12th grade, offering science, commerce and arts streams at the +2 levels. The school is recognised by The Council for the Indian School Certificate Examinations, New Delhi (ICSE/ISC). Falakata has two more co-ed English medium schools, one being Techno India and the other being Morning Star. There are many government primary schools provides free education for poor children. On another hand, private primary schools are growing day by day. Usha Academy, Kidzee and Little Laurates are the kindergarten schools at Falakata.

== Healthcare ==
Falakata Rural Hospital, with 30 beds at Falakata, is the major government medical facility in the Falakata CD block.

Falakata Super Specialty Hospital, with 100 beds, is the major Government medical facility in the Falakata CD block now.

== Transport ==
Falakata Railway Station serves the town. Trains available for Kolkata, Delhi, Guwahati, Siliguri, Agartala etc. Buses and Public Transportation available for Alipurduar, Cooch Behar, Siliguri, Jalpaiguri, Tufanganj, Dinhata, Jorai, Barobisa, Jaigaon, Mathabhanga, Jaldapara, Maynaguri, Birpara, Banarhat, Malbazar, Sevoke. NBSTC bus depot is one of the popular bus stations in this area. Buses for Kolkata, Malda, Berhampore, Farakka, Assam are available from here. Falakata Taxi Stand is also available for private journeys.
