= Birpara =

Census Town in West Bengal, India

- Census Town
- Location in West Bengal, India Birpara (India) Birpara (Asia)
- Coordinates: 26.711583°N 89.140395°E
- Country: India
- State: West Bengal
- District: Alipurduar

Area
  - Total: 6.1247 km^{2} (2.3648 sq mi)

Population (2011)
  - Total: 42,080
  - Density: 6,871/km^{2} (17,790/sq mi)

Languages
  - Official: Bengali
  - Additional official: Nepali
- Time zone: UTC+5:30 (IST)
- PIN: 735204
- Telephone code: 03561
- Vehicle registration: WB-70
- Nearest city: Siliguri
- Lok Sabha constituency: Alipurduars
- Vidhan Sabha constituency: Madarihat
- Climate: cool with adequate rainfall (Köppen)
- Website: alipurduar.gov.in

Birpara is a census town in the Alipurduar subdivision of the Alipurduar district in the Indian state of West Bengal. It is an important location in the Dooars region and is surrounded by scenic landscapes and various tea gardens. Birpara lies about 60 km from Jalpaiguri and about 101 km from Siliguri. The town is located close to the Bhutan border town of Gomtu.

== Geography ==
Places and tea estates in the western portion of Alipurduar subdivision (including Madarihat-Birpara, Falakata and Alipurduar I CD blocks) in Alipurduar district
CT: census town, R: rural/ urban centre, N: neighbourhood, NP: national park/ wildlife sanctuary, TE: tea estate
Abbreviations used in names – TG for Tea Garden (town/village), TE for Tea Estate
Owing to space constraints in the small map, the actual locations in a larger map may vary slightly

=== Location ===
Birpara is located at 26.7113°N 89.1366°E.

According to the map of the Madarihat CD block on page 193 in the District Census Handbook, Jalpaiguri, 2011 census, Birpara Police station is shown as being a part of the Birpara town.

Birpara Tea Garden spared a portion of their cultivable land for the establishment of Birpara town, many years ago. Over the years, it has developed as an important town in the area.

=== Area overview ===
Alipurduar district is covered by two maps. It is an extensive area in the eastern end of the Dooars in West Bengal. It is undulating country, largely forested, with numerous rivers flowing down from the outer ranges of the Himalayas in Bhutan. It is a predominantly rural area with 79.38% of the population living in the rural areas. The district has 1 municipal town and 20 census towns and that means 20.62% of the population lives in urban areas. The scheduled castes and scheduled tribes, taken together, form more than half the population in all the six community development blocks in the district. There is a high concentration of tribal people (scheduled tribes) in the three northern blocks of the district.

Note: The map alongside presents some of the notable locations in the subdivision. All places marked in the map are linked in the larger full screen map.

The Dooars: A World

After we arrived at New Jalpaiguri Railway Station, he (my husband) drove me out into the hot and humid plains to Birpara Tea Garden... The Dooars is a world that abounds in natural beauty, with its forests, rivers and mountains. There are more than two hundred tea gardens here… The early British planters brought with them thousands of migrant Adivasi labourers from the neighbouring Chhotta Nagpur region. They also brought Nepali workers from the hills. The original inhabitants of the area were gradually outnumbered. North Bengal began to grow into the multi-ethnic region it has become today.

Where I now live, the nearest town is just two kilometers away. National Highway 31, as well as the second broad gauge line from Guwahati to Delhi, runs less than one kilometere away from my house. There are gardens in the interior too, from where a ride to the nearest town could take an hour's drive over riverbeds or through dark and frightening forests full of wild animals. We even have wild elephants, snakes and leopards that very often make their way into our bungalow compound!

Since 1992, we’ve had satellite television, and since 1999 we’ve had Internet connections. We didn’t have a phone line that could connect us to family in Delhi until 1996, though! We wrote letters and waited for weeks for replies to reach us.

Life is an amazing and curious mix of old and new, civilization and wilderness, natural beauty and cultivated plantations.

— Gowri Mohanakrishnan

== Civic administration ==
=== Police station ===
Birpara police station has jurisdiction over a part of the Madarihat-Birpara CD block.

== Demographics ==
According to the 2011 Census of India, Birpara Tea Garden had a total population of 42,080 of which 21,226 (50%) were males and 20,854 (50%) were females. There were 4,788 persons in the age range of 0 to 6 years. The total number of literate people in Birpara Tea Garden was 28,020 (75.14% of the population over 6 years).

== Economy ==
In 1859, Walter Duncan, a young Scottish merchant, began his business ventures in India. Initially established as Playfair Duncan & Co., the firm grew into Duncan Brothers, with its earliest enterprises including the Birpara Tea Company and Anglo-India Jute Mills.

The Goenka family took over Duncan Brothers in 1951. Under the leadership of G.P. Goenka, the company diversified substantially, emerging as one of the top business houses in the country. The Tea Division of Duncans currently operates nine tea gardens in the Dooars—Birpara, Hantapara, Dumchipara, Lankapara, Tulsipara, Garganda, Killot, Nagaisuri, and Bagracote—as well as one garden in the Terai region at Gungram (often spelled Gangaram), Phansidewa block of the Darjeeling district, West Bengal.

The company regularly carries out the uprooting, replanting, and rejuvenation of tea areas. It maintains high-quality clonal gardens and has expanded significantly over the years. For instance, the Birpara Tea Estate consists of 798.78 hectares of mature tea and 128.65 hectares of young tea; in 1998–99, it produced 1.817 million kg of tea. Notably, yields in Duncan gardens are double the national average.

Recently, the Tea Division of the Duncan Goenka Group has been facing "rough weather" on the labor front and has frequently appeared in the news. According to newspaper reports, there is a likelihood of an ownership change.

== Services ==
Birpara lies on NH17 and frequent buses, jeeps and taxis are available from Birpara to Siliguri, Malbazar, Alipurduar, Jaigaon, Hasimara etc. Since, it lies on the Siliguri-Jaigaon route so taxis and jeeps are also available towards Gangtok, Kalimpong, Rangpo etc. Bagdogra Airport is the nearest airport from the town. There is a station at Dalgaon, nearby, on the New Jalpaiguri-Alipurduar-Samuktala line.

According to the District Census Handbook 2011, Jalpaiguri, Birpara covered an area of 6.1247 km^{2}. Among the civic amenities, the protected water supply involved hand pumps. It had 1,075 domestic electric connections. Among the medical facilities it had 1 hospital, 8 medicine shops. Among the educational facilities it had 10 primary schools, 7 middle schools, 5 secondary schools. It had 1 recognised shorthand, typewriting and vocational training institution, 1 special school for the disabled.

== Education ==
Birpara College was established in 1986. Affiliated with the University of North Bengal, it offers honours courses in Bengali, Nepali, geography, history, sociology, a general course in arts, and honours and general courses in commerce.
