= Dooars-Terai tea gardens =

Tea gardens in West Bengal, India

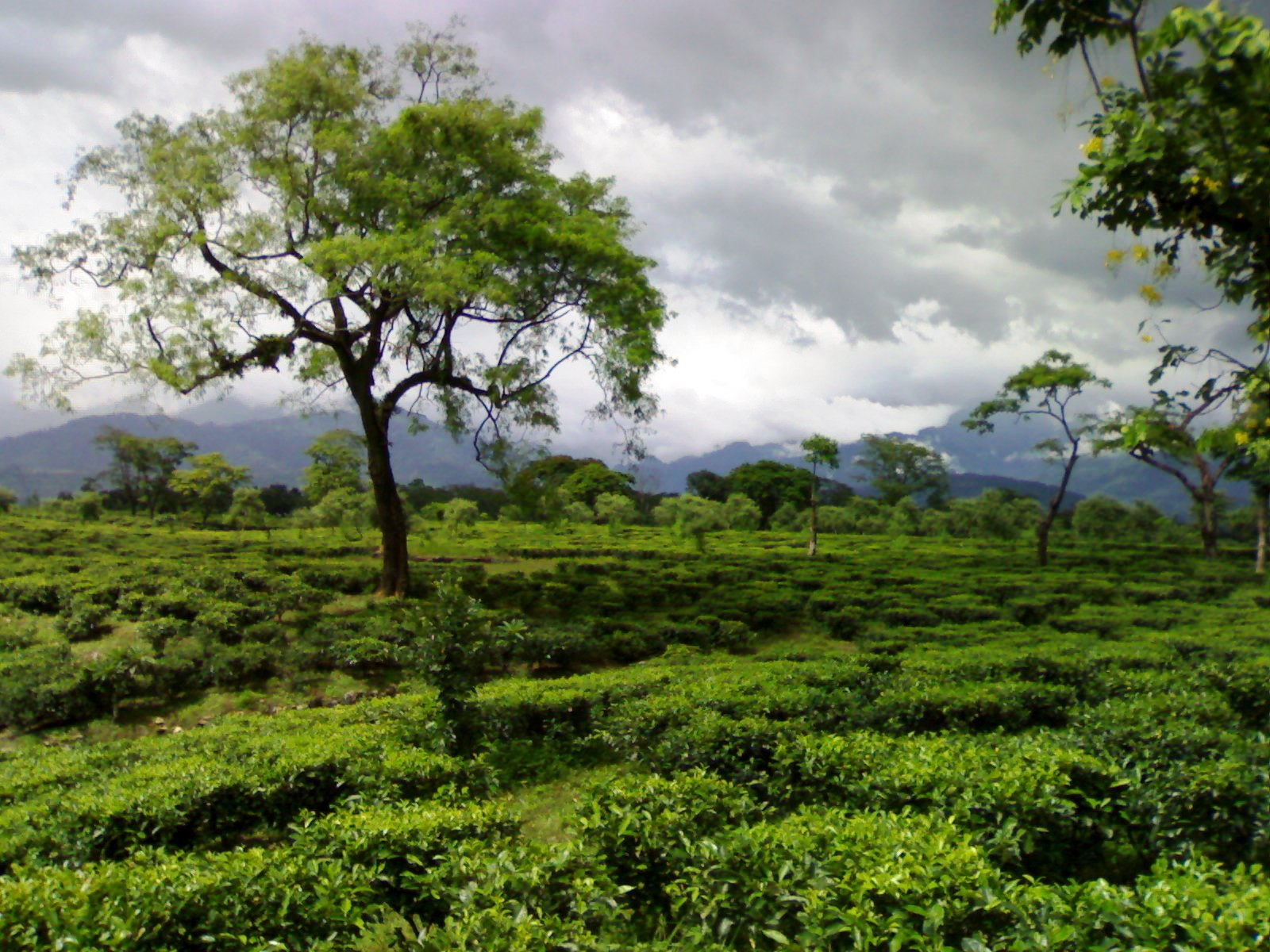
- Hila Tea Garden in Nagrakata CD block
- Location: Jalpaiguri division, West Bengal, India
- Area: 97,280 hectares (240,400 acres)
- Elevation: 90 to 1,750 metres (300 to 5,740 ft)
- Open: 1862

Dooars-Terai tea gardens refers to the tea gardens in the Dooars and Terai regions in the Jalpaiguri Division of West Bengal, India

== History ==
When the British were exploring for prospective areas to grow tea in India, the Darjeeling Himalayan hill region appeared to be one of the possible sites. Located at altitudes ranging from 600 to 2,000 metres (2,000 to 6,600 ft) and having an annual average rainfall of around 309 centimetres (122 in), it had the advantage of locational climate and soil conditions. There were experiments from the early 1800s, followed by commercial cultivation around 1853. By 1874, there were 113 gardens in Darjeeling district. The rapid growth of the tea industry from the earliest days inspired planters to try out tea cultivation in the adjoining Terai region and James White set up the first Terai plantation in 1862 at Champta, the first Dooars garden came up at Gazalduba and by 1876, the area had 13 plantations. The altitude in the tea-growing areas of the Dooars-Terai region range from 90 to 1,750 metres (300 to 5,740 ft) and receives an annual rainfall of around 350 centimetres (140 in). The tea grown in the Dooars-Terai region has the distinction of having "a bright, smooth and full-bodied liquor that’s a wee bit lighter than Assam tea". The region produces CTC tea. The tea-estate landscape of the Dooars also includes surviving planter bungalows from the colonial period. Some of these buildings have been restored and adapted for heritage stays, including bungalows at Sylee and Nya Sylee tea estates in Jalpaiguri district.

== Tea gardens ==
Tea plantations in the region are spread over 97,280 hectares (240,400 acres). The region produces 226 million kg of tea, accounting for about a quarter of India's total tea crop. There are 154 gardens in the Dooars out of 283 tea gardens in north Bengal that employ 3.5 lakh workers. Cultivation of tea in the Dooars was primarily pioneered and promoted by the British but there was significant contribution of Indian entrepreneurs. (#The figure can vary, as per source.)

In 1859, a young Scottish merchant, Walter Duncan, started business ventures in India. Initiated as Playfair Duncan company, it grew as Duncan Brothers. The Goenka family took over Duncan Brothers in 1951, and under the leadership of G.P. Goenka, diversified substantially and emerged as one of the top business houses in the country. The Tea Division of Duncans has nine tea gardens in the Dooars – Birpara, Hantapara, Dumchipara, Lankapara, Tulsipara, Garganda, Killot, Nagaisuri, Bagracote – and one garden in the Terai region at Gungram. The company has been regularly carrying out uprooting, replanting and rejuvenation of tea areas. It has high quality clonal gardens and has expanded substantially over the years.

Established in 1977, Goodricke owns 18 tea estates in India, all inherited from sterling tea companies, who operated from the late 1800s. Goodricke has 12 gardens in the Dooars. Goodricke's tea gardens in the Dooars are: Danguajhar, Leesh River, Meenglas, Hope, Aibheel, Chulsa, Chalouni, Jiti, Sankos, Gandrapara, Lakhipara and Kumargram. Eight sterling tea companies viz., The Assam-Doors Tea Co. Ltd., Hope Tea Co. Ltd., The Lebong Chulsa Tea Co. Ltd., The British Darjeeling Tea Co. Ltd., The Chulsa Tea Co. Ltd., The Leesh River Tea Co. Ltd., The Danguajhar Tea Co. Ltd., and The Meenglas Tea Co. Ltd., were amalgamated with Goodricke in 1977.

Incorporated in 1945, Jay Shree Tea and Manufacturing Ltd., owned by the B.K.Birla group, is the third-largest tea producer in the world with 22 tea estates spread across India and East Africa. It owns Aryaman Tea Estate. The other tea gardens of the Jay Shree Tea & Industries Ltd. in the Dooars-Terai region are: Kumarika, Marionbarie and Jayantika.

Gurjangjhora Tea Garden belongs to the Kalyani group. Other tea estates of the Kalyani group in the Dooars region are Saraswatipur Tea Estate and Choulbari Tea Estate. The Luxmi Group, founded in 1912, owns 25 tea estates spread across India and Africa. It has a garden at Fulbari, Naxalbari, in the Terai region. Gillanders Arbuthnot & Co. Ltd., owned by the Kothari Group, has two gardens in the Dooars-Terai region: Gairkhata, Nagrakata and Taipoo, Bagdogra. The Palchoudhuri family owns the Mohurgong & Gulma Tea Estates and Washarabarie Tea Estate. Andrew Yule & Co. Ltd., established in 1863, has tea gardens in Dooars at Karbala, Banarhat, Choonabhutti and New Dooars.

== Export potential ==
In 2016, India accounted for a fourth of the global tea production but secured only a little over a tenth of the tea exports. 60% of India's tea exports are CTC tea. India is losing out in the international market to other countries, such as Kenya, Sri Lanka, Indonesia and even Bangladesh, who have lower cost of production. Within the country tea prices have been stagnant, while costs have risen by 60 per cent in five years prior to 2015.

== Unviable operations ==
As of 2019, the minimum daily wage of tea garden workers is Rs. 176 per day, as compared with Rs. 297 earned by bidi workers. This too has come as an interim measure, after the Dooars tea workers have been agitating for higher wages, as well as better facilities for education and healthcare.

As per industry sources, labour cost is about 60 per cent of the cost of production of tea. As cost of labour rises, tea garden operations are becoming increasingly unviable. Between 2002 and 2007, 17 tea gardens shut down in the Dooars and the renowned Goenka Duncans group recently shut down 7 tea gardens. The latter alone lead to the loss of employment for around 25,000 workers. At least 1,200 deaths have been reported in the area. Under the Financial Assistance to Workers of Locked Out Industries (FAWLOI) scheme, the West Bengal government provides a monthly assistance of Rs 1,500 to each permanent worker of the locked out gardens. This at least takes care of bare meals and helps in mitigating the threats of starvation deaths.

Among the closed tea gardens are: Kathalguri, Ramjhora, Redbank, Surendranagar, Chamurchi, Raipur, Bamandanga-Tondu, Samsing, Chinchula, Shikarpur-Bhandarpur, Bharnobary, Malnady, Kalchini & Roymatang and Dheklapara. An official release of the Press Information Bureau, Government of India, notified the following gardens as closed: Madhu Tea Garden, Dheklapara, Bundapani, Dharanipur, Redbank, Surendranagar, Panighata and Manabarrie.

== Improving brand value ==
According to a study carried out by the Indian Institute of Management, Calcutta, the tea produced by the plantations of North Bengal (Dooars area) do not have the brand value of Darjeeling tea or Assam tea. Around 2002-2004 the industry faced a crisis and at least 22 plantations were closed down in Jalpaiguri district, affecting 21,000 permanent workers and impacting a much larger population. The Indian Tea Association has floated an idea whereby 10 gardens, of the total 290 in the Dooars region, have been identified and they will brand their produce under the brand name Dooars Robusta. It is felt that this would enhance their brand value.

== Workers ==
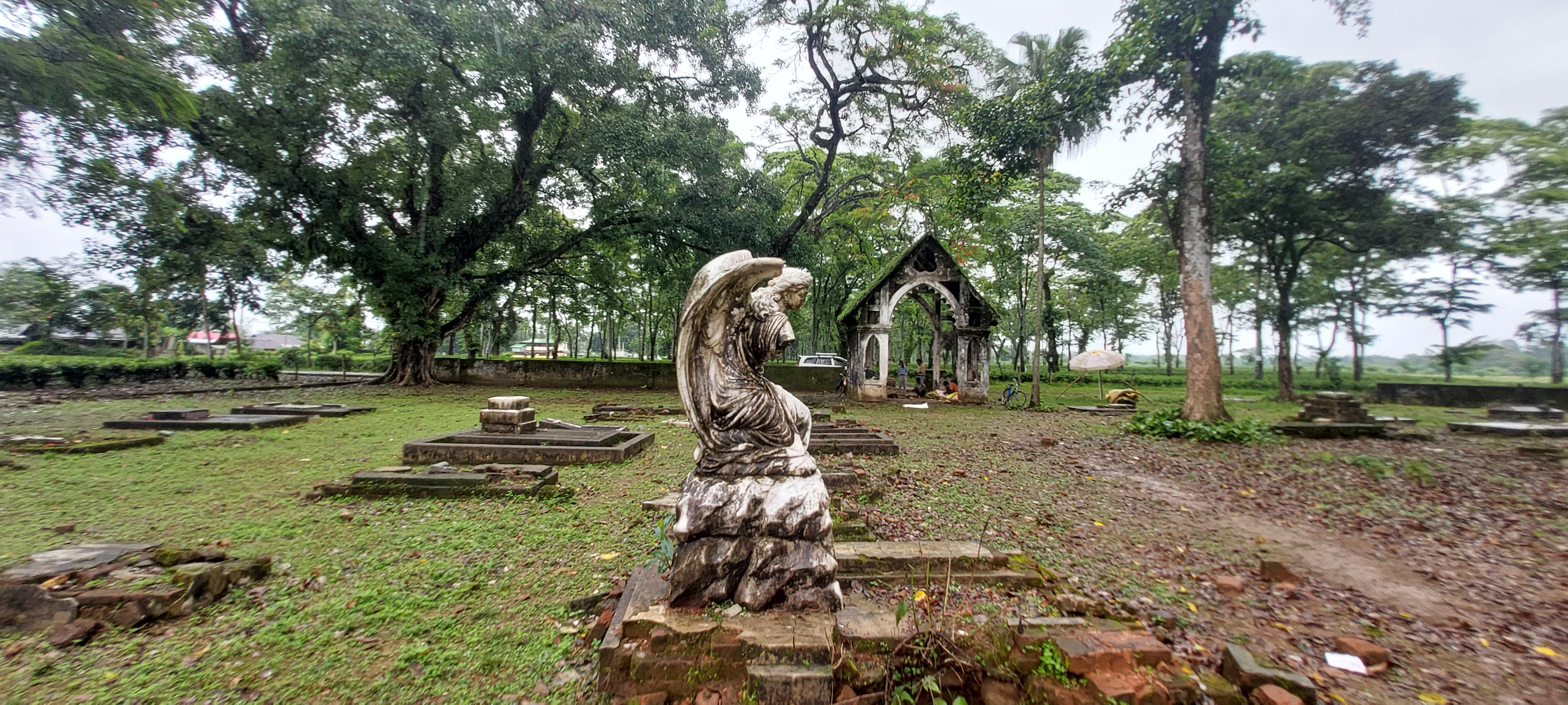
Rangamati Tea Estate European Cemetery

Adivasis from Chotanagpur form a sizeable section of the workers in the tea gardens in the area. Dumka, Hazaribagh, Ranchi and Chaibasa formed one of the biggest catchment areas for tea garden labour in the twilight years of the 19th century. “The notorious coolie trade under colonial rule exploited the dispossession, indebtedness and despair of Adivasis to transport them, often by force or deception, as far as Assam or the Dooars – or even further afield to plantations in Trinidad, Guyana, South Africa and Malaya. A century and a half later, these communities are on the move again. The moribund economy of the Dooars region has rendered these communities vulnerable yet again.” Apart from the Adivasis, many tea garden workers are Nepali and Rajbanshi. Nepalis comprise 10% of the workers. Several European Tea estate owner and manager were died there due to black fever and malaria, they were buried in Rangamati Tea Estate Cemetery.
