= Mandelli =

Mandelli is an Italian surname. Notable people with the surname include:

- Davide Mandelli (born 1977), Italian footballer
- Louis Mandelli (1833–1880), Italian zoologist and ornithologist
- Mariuccia Mandelli (1925–2015), Italian fashion designer and businesswoman
- Paolo Mandelli (born 1967), Italian footballer and manager

== See also ==
- Mandelli Sistemi
- Mandelli's mouse-eared bat, species of vesper bat
