= Rangamati Tea Estate Cemetery =

Cemetery in West Bengal

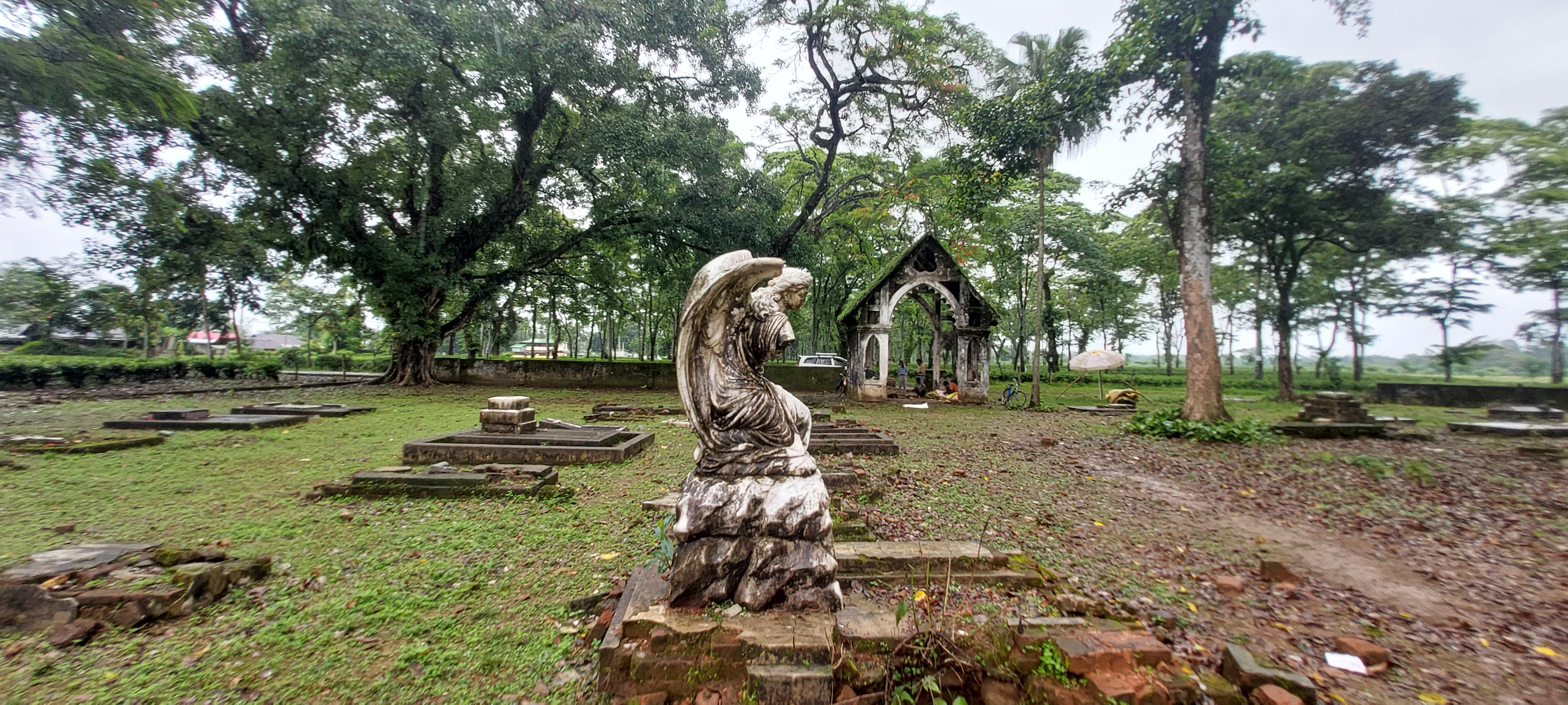
- Graves in Rangamati Tea Estate Cemetery
- Interactive map of Rangamati Tea Estate Cemetery

Details
- Established: 1854; 172 years ago
- Abandoned: 1968
- Location: Chaibasa, Rangamati tea garden, Jalpaiguri district
- Country: India
- Coordinates: 26°53′32″N 88°41′01″E
- Type: Historic

Rangamati Tea Estate Cemetery is a European cemetery situated at Chaibasa village, Rangamati tea garden, under Malbazar subdivision of Jalpaiguri district in West Bengal, India.

== History ==
The cemetery area is spread over more than five bighas, having around 100 graves. British, Scottish, Irish and Australian people attached with tea plantation estates of Dooars were buried in the cemetery. It was started in 1854. The grave of Edward Francis Greenway, who died on 28 November 1860, is the oldest one, and Swinton Thomas Agacy of Baradighi tea estate was the last person buried, on 6 March 1968, in this cemetery. Presently, most of the graves are in dilapidated condition, without maintenance.

== Gallery ==
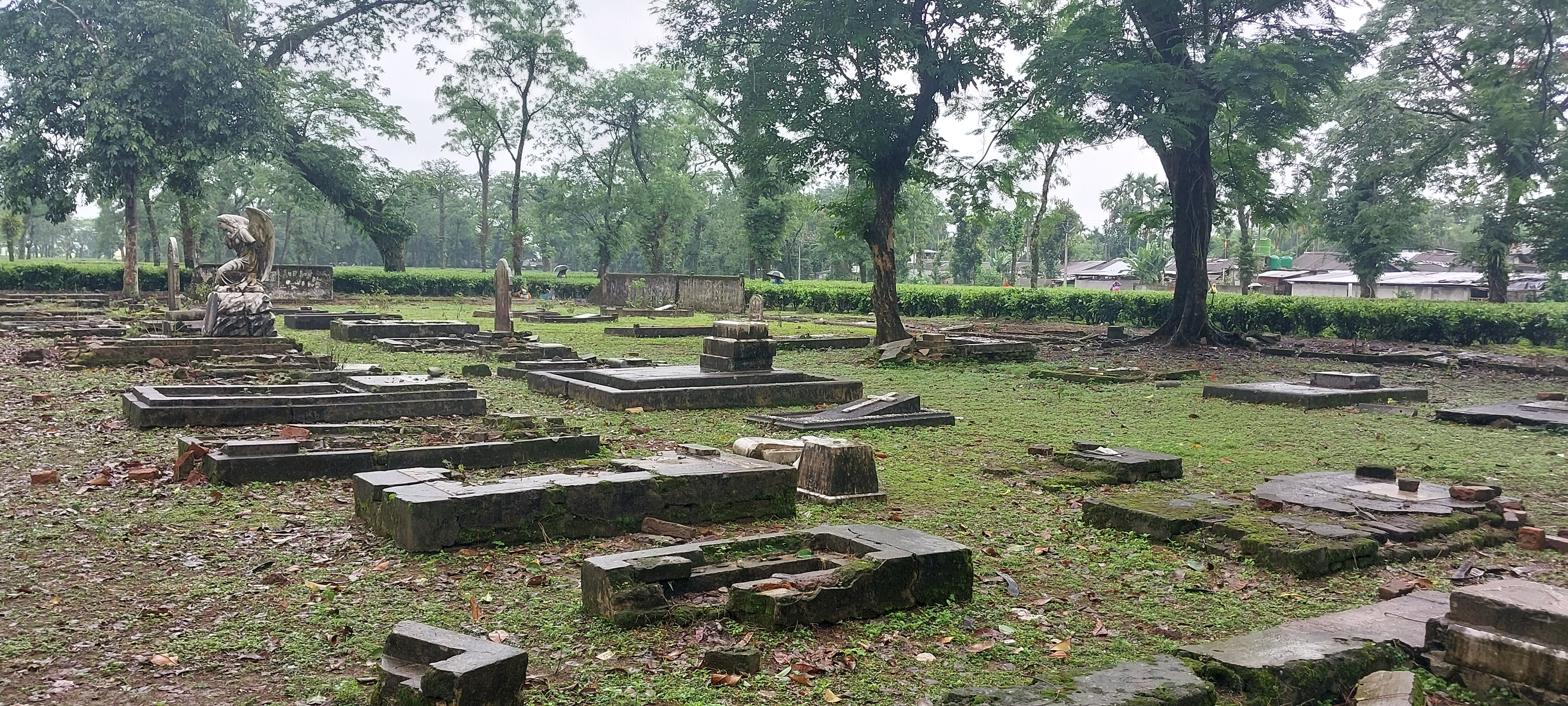

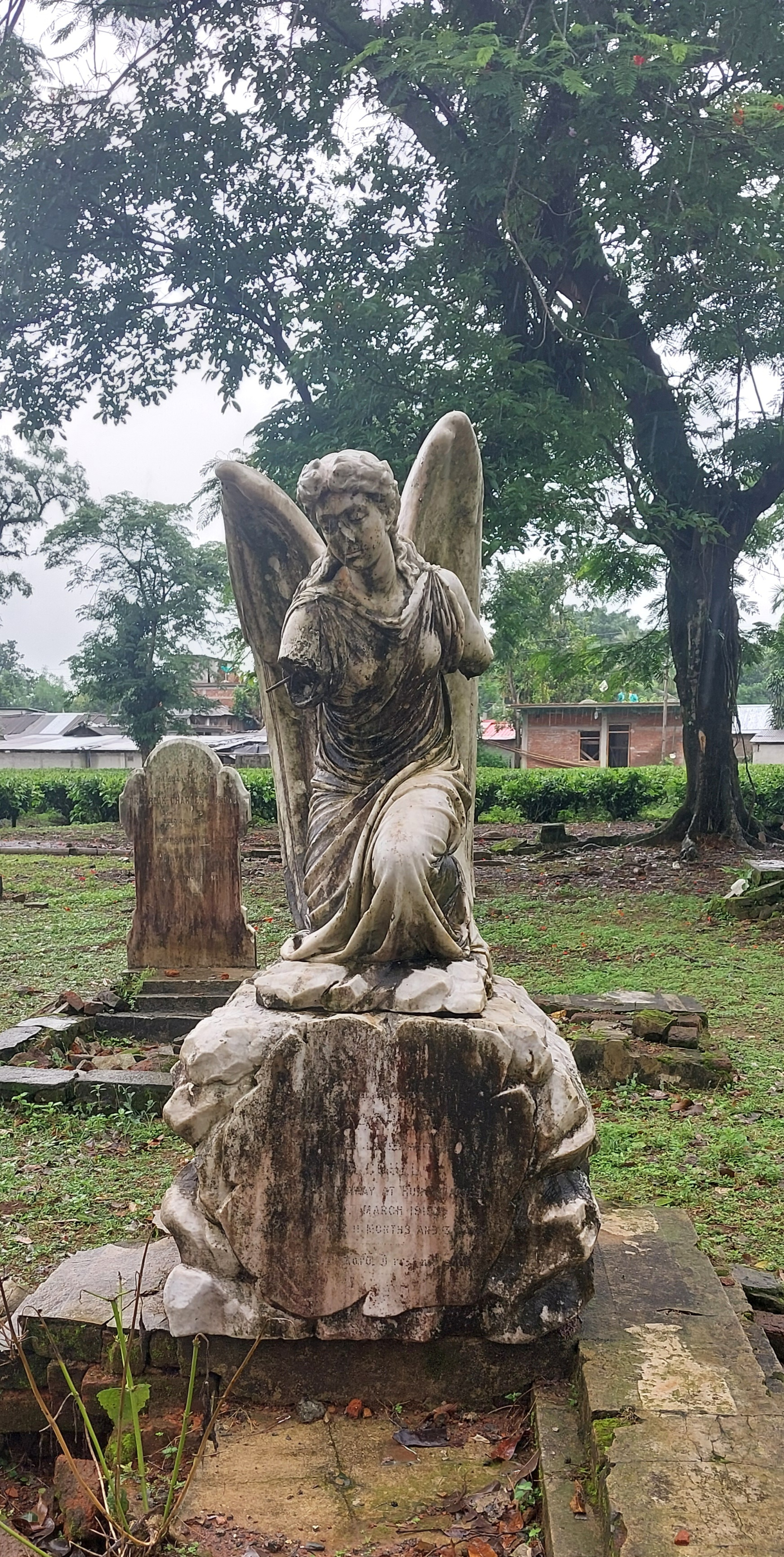

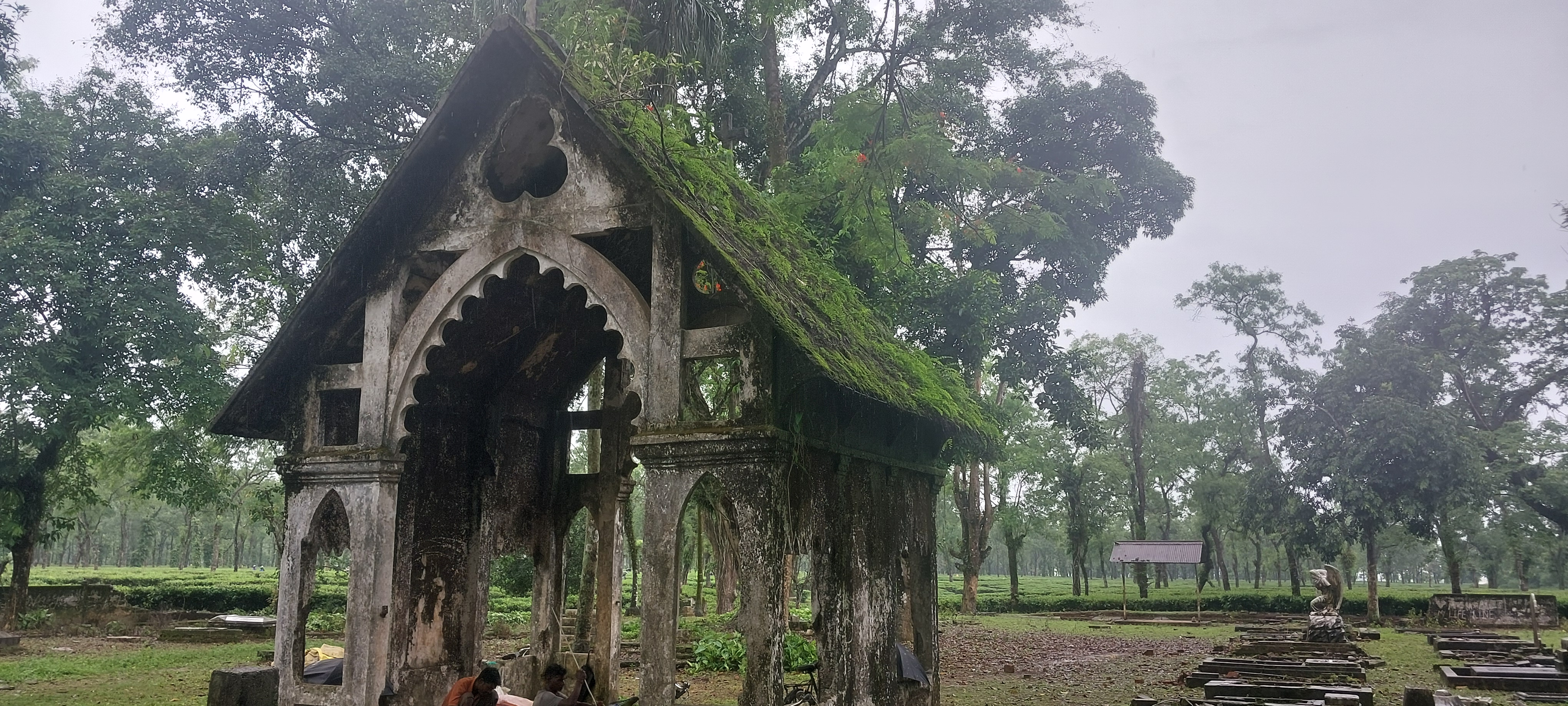

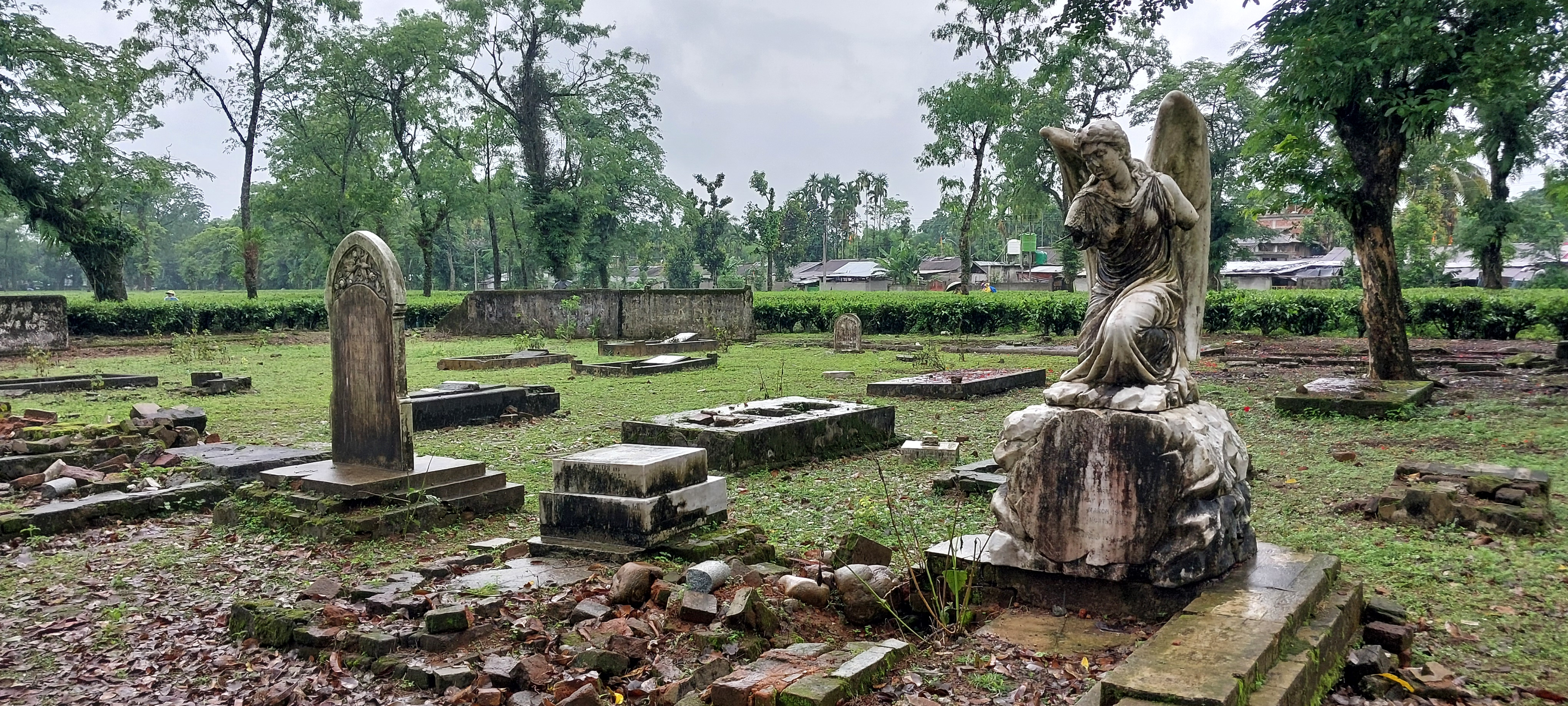

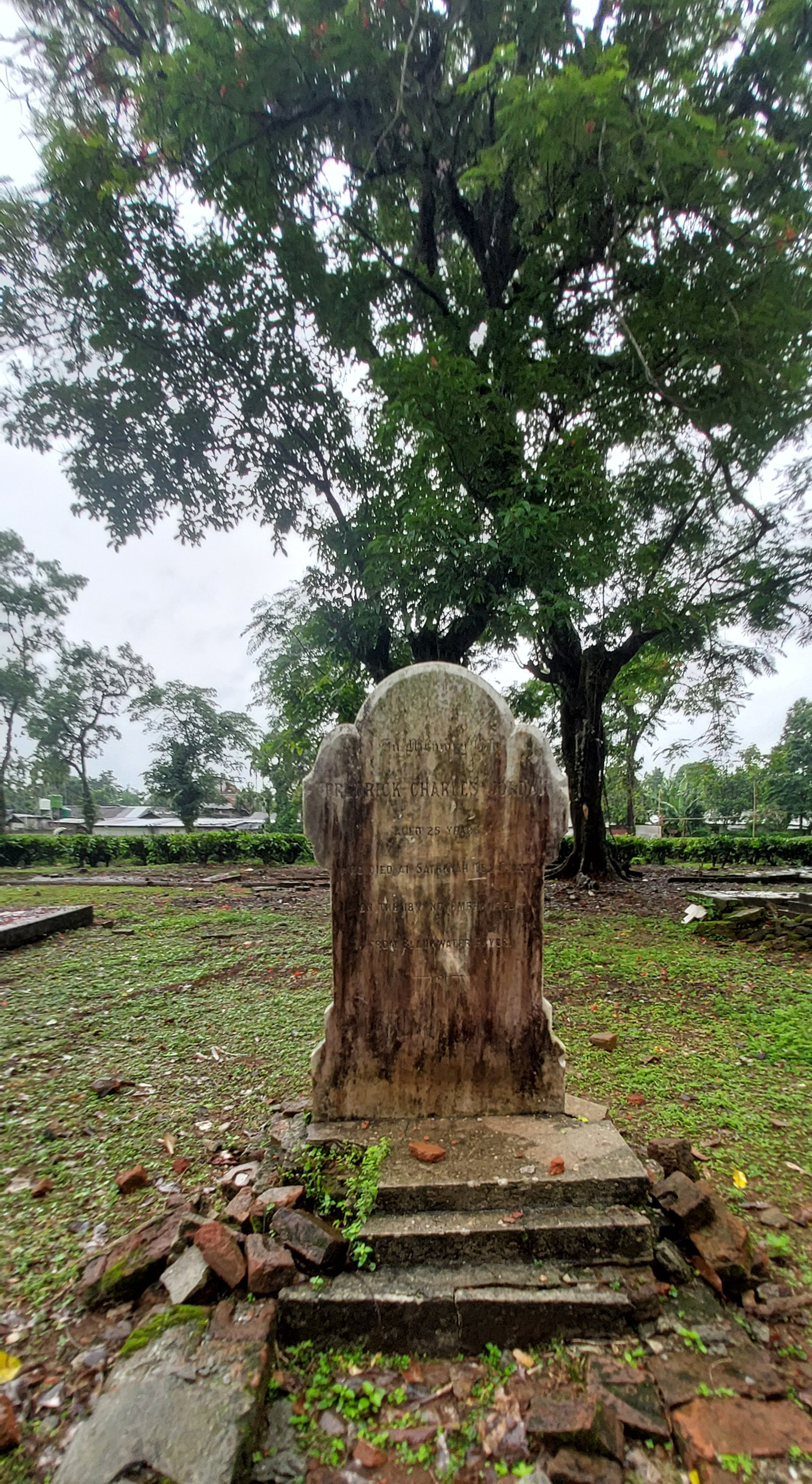

== See also ==
- Darjeeling Old Cemetery
- St. Andrew's Church, Darjeeling
- Kurseong Cemetery
