= Madhu Tea Garden =

- Village
- Location in West Bengal, India Madhu Tea Garden (India)
- Coordinates: 26.7184°N 89.4021°E
- Country: India
- State: West Bengal
- District: Alipurduar

Population (2011)
  - Total: 4,540
- Time zone: UTC+5:30 (IST)
- PIN: 735217
- Telephone/STD code: 03566
- Vehicle registration: WB
- Lok Sabha constituency: Alipurduars
- Vidhan Sabha constituency: Kalchini
- Website: alipurduar.gov.in

Madhu Tea Garden is a village in the Kalchini CD block in the Alipurduar subdivision of the Alipurduar district in West Bengal, India

== History ==
The Madhu Tea Estate in the Dooars was planted by the Roy family of Jalpaiguri, who had more than twelve tea estates in Dooars and Darjeeling districts. Madhu Tea Estate was named after Madhusudan Guha. Before that the place was known as Patabari.

=== Closed ===
As of 2019, as per an official release of the Press Information Bureau, Government of India, Madhu Tea Estate, with 947 affected workers, was closed. The release said, "11 tea gardens are closed in the country. The main reasons for closure of these gardens are attributed to poor yield of the estates, ageing bush profile and high vacancy percentage in tea area, negligible uprooting / replanting of age old tea bushes for years, poor garden management practices, falling quality and price realizations, overall lack of development perspective, highly debt oriented funding strategy and ownership disputes." Other tea estates in West Bengal listed as closed were: Dheklapara, Bundapani, Dharanipur, Redbank, Surendranagar, Panighata and Manabarrie.

=== Geography ===
Places and tea estates in the eastern portion of Alipurdar subdivision (including Kalchini, Kumargram and Alipuduar II CD blocks) in Alipurduar district
CT: census town, R: rural/ urban centre, N: neighbourhood, A: Air Force Station, NP: national park/ wildlife sanctuary, TE: tea estate, H: historical site
Abbreviations used in names – TG for Tea Garden (town/village), TE for Tea Estate
Owing to space constraints in the small map, the actual locations in a larger map may vary slightly

=== Area overview ===
Alipurduar district is covered by two maps. It is an extensive area in the eastern end of the Dooars in West Bengal. It is undulating country, largely forested, with numerous rivers flowing down from the outer ranges of the Himalayas in Bhutan. It is a predominantly rural area with 79.38% of the population living in the rural areas. The district has 1 municipal town and 20 census towns and that means that 20.62% of the population lives in the urban areas. The scheduled castes and scheduled tribes, taken together, form more than half the population in all the six community development blocks in the district. There is a high concentration of tribal people (scheduled tribes) in the three northern blocks of the district.

Note: The map alongside presents some of the notable locations in the subdivision. All places marked in the map are linked in the larger full screen map.

=== Location ===
Madhu Tea Garden is located at 26.7184°N 89.4021°E.

It is 17 km away from Phuntsholing, the border town of Bhutan and hardly 1.5 km from Air Force Station Hasimara. It is 8 km from Kalchini B.D.O. Office. A broad gauge rail line and Pucca road crossed along the side of Madhu Tea Estate. The nearest railway station, Hasimara, is 3 km. There is a medium-sized tea factory, a Dakbungalow, a small hospital, a post office, and a Bengali medium higher secondary school at Madhu Tea Estate. There is a big football playground. Buses and taxis are available at Madhu Choupathi.

There is a small stream between Madhu Forest and Madhu Tea Estate called Pataijhora or Madhu River. Though it is small it has flooded the entire area many times. A forest basty, named Dalbadal basty is situated between the estate and forest.

== Demographics ==
As per the 2011 Census of India, Madhu Tea Garden had a total population of 4,540. There were 2,233 (49%) males and 2,307 (51%) females. There were 476 persons in the age range of 0 to 6 years. The total number of literate people in Madhu Tea Garden was 2,735 (67.30% of the population over 6 years).
