= Kurseong Cemetery =

Cemetery in West Bengal

Coordinates: 26.8720°N 88.2677°E

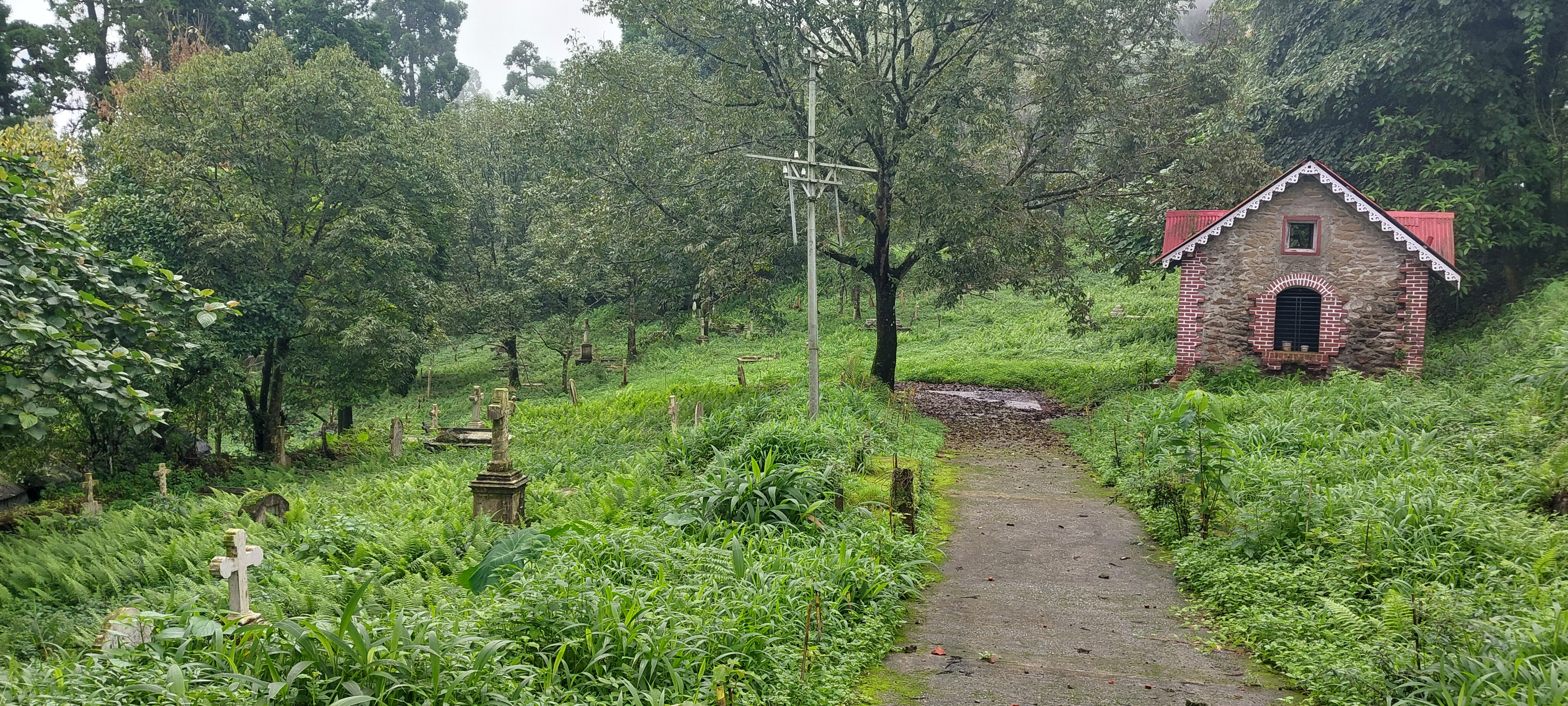
- Photograph taken August 2025
- Interactive map of Kurseong Cemetery

Kurseong Cemetery or St. Paul Cemetery is a colonial heritage cemetery situated beside Pankhabari road at Kurseong, in Darjeeling district in the Indian state of West Bengal.

== History ==
Kurseong town was developed after the construction of the Darjeeling Himalayan Railway and expansion of tea plantations in the Darjeeling hills area. This cemetery was set up for European missionaries, tea planters, government officials and their families.

== See also ==
- Darjeeling Old Cemetery
- St. Andrew's Church, Darjeeling
- Rangamati Tea Estate Cemetery
