= Meenglas and Leesh River Tea Estates =

Tea gardens in West Bengal, India

- Location: Jalpaiguri district, West Bengal, India
- Nearest city: Oodlabari
- Elevation: 784 feet (239 m)
- Owner: Goodricke
- Open: late 1800s

Meenglas Tea Estate and Leesh River Tea Estate are tea gardens, located near each other in the Mal CD block in the Malbazar subdivision of the Jalpaiguri district in the Indian state of West Bengal. Both the tea estates are located in the western end of the Dooars.

== Geography ==
Places and tea estates in Malbabazar subdivision (including Mal, Nagrakata and Matiali CD blocks) in Jalpaiguri district
CT: census town, R: rural/ urban centre, N: neighbourhood, NP: national park/ wildlife sanctuary, TE: tea estate
Abbreviations used in names – TG for Tea Garden (town/village), TE for Tea Estate, JRS: junction railway station
Owing to space constraints in the small map, the actual locations in a larger map may vary slightly

=== Location ===
Meenglas Tea Estate is located at 26.9204°N 88.6844°E.

Meenglas Tea Estate is flanked by the Chel River on the west and Malnudy on the east. The Newra range of Gorubathan forest is on the north.

Leesh River Tea Estate is located at 26.8596°N 88.5894°E

Leesh River Tea Estate is surrounded by rivers on three sides - Geesh River on the east, Leesh River on the west and Teesta River on the south.

=== Area overview ===
Gorumara National Park has overtaken traditionally popular Jaldapara National Park in footfall and Malbazar has emerged as one of the most important towns in the Dooars. Malbazar subdivision is presented in the map alongside. It is a predominantly rural area with 88.62% of the population living in rural areas and 11.32% living in the urban areas. Tea gardens in the Dooars and Terai regions produce 226 million kg or over a quarter of India's total tea crop. Some tea gardens were identified in the 2011 census as census towns or villages. Such places are marked in the map as CT (census town) or R (rural/ urban centre). Specific tea estate pages are marked TE.

Note: The map alongside presents some of the notable locations in the subdivision. All places marked in the map are linked in the larger full screen map.

== The gardens ==
At Meenglas Tea Estate the old garden was uprooted and replanted afresh. The old factory equipment was dismantled and a new processing unit was installed in 2007. It is one of the best modernized tea processing units in the region, HACCP certified since 2008. It produces high quality CTC tea.

At Leesh River Tea Estate there are three divisions - Leesh, Hope and Patibari. In the Leesh Division, earlier named Phoolbarie, there are records that state that it had a planted area of 600 acres. It was among the first gardens to be planted in North Bengal. been The garden has recently been modified and has a HACCP-certified modern factory.

== Goodricke ==
Established in 1977, Goodricke owns 18 tea estates in India, all inherited from sterling tea companies, who operated from the late 1800s. Goodricke has 12 gardens in the Dooars. With its rich agro climate the area produces CTC tea. Goodricke's tea gardens in the Dooars are: Danguajhar, Leesh River, Meenglas, Hope, Aibheel, Chulsa, Chalouni, Jiti, Sankos, Gandrapara, Lakhipara and Kumargram.

Eight sterling tea companies viz., The Assam-Doors Tea Co. Ltd., Hope Tea Co. Ltd., The Lebong Chulsa Tea Co. Ltd., The British Darjeeling Tea Co. Ltd., The Chulsa Tea Co. Ltd., The Leesh River Tea Co. Ltd., The Danguajhar Tea Co. Ltd., and The Meenglas Tea Co. Ltd., were amalgamated with Goodricke in 1977.

== Tourism ==
Odlabari is an upcoming tourist attraction in the area. It offers some of the most spectacular sights in the Dooars region.
