= Aryaman Tea Estate =

Tea gardens in West Bengal, India

- Interactive map of Aryaman Tea Estate
- Location: Alipurduar district, West Bengal, India
- Nearest city: Madarihat
- Coordinates: 26.6599°N 89.2576°E
- Area: 222 hectares (550 acres)
- Owner: Jay Shree Tea
- Open: 1994

Aryaman Tea Estate is a tea garden, located in the Madarihat-Birpara CD block in the Alipurduar subdivision of the Alipurduar district in the Indian state of West Bengal.

== Etymology ==
It is named after the great grandson of the eminent businessman, B.K.Birla.

== Geography ==
Places and tea estates in the western portion of Alipurdar subdivision (including Madarihat-Birpara, Falakata and Alipuduar I CD blocks) in Alipurduar district
CT: census town, R: rural/ urban centre, N: neighbourhood, NP: national park/ wildlife sanctuary, TE: tea estate
Abbreviations used in names – TG for Tea Garden (town/village), TE for Tea Estate
Owing to space constraints in the small map, the actual locations in a larger map may vary slightly

=== Location ===
Aryaman Tea Estate is located in the Jaldapara National Park and Leopard Rehabilitation Centre, Kherbari. The nearest railway station is at Madarihat. Bagdogra Airport is 155 km away.

=== Area overview ===
Alipurduar district is covered by two maps. It is an extensive area in the eastern end of the Dooars in West Bengal. It is undulating country, largely forested, with numerous rivers flowing down from the outer ranges of the Himalayas in Bhutan. It is a predominantly rural area with 79.38% of the population living in the rural areas. The district has 1 municipal town and 20 census towns and that means that 20.62% of the population lives in the urban areas. The scheduled castes and scheduled tribes, taken together, form more than half the population in all the six community development blocks in the district. There is a high concentration of tribal people (scheduled tribes) in the three northern blocks of the district.

Note: The map alongside presents some of the notable locations in the subdivision. All places marked in the map are linked in the larger full screen map.

== Dooars-Terai tea ==
Tea gardens in the Dooars and Terai regions produce 226 million kg or over a quarter of India's total tea crop. The Dooars region contains wild-life rich tropical forests, undulating plains and low hills. Innumerable streams and rivers descend from the mountains of Bhutan and flow through the fertile plains in the Dooars region. The elevation of the Dooars area ranges from 90 m to 1750 m and it receives around 350 cm of rain. The Dooars-Terai tea is characterized by a bright, smooth and full-bodied liquor that's a wee bit lighter than Assam tea. Cultivation of tea in the Dooars was primarily pioneered and promoted by the British but there was significant contribution of Indian entrepreneurs.

== The garden ==
Aryaman Tea Estate was acquired by Jayshree Tea and Industries in 1994. It made huge investments in creating a tea plantation on a land laid waste by wild animals. A factory to produce quality CTC tea was set up in 1999. The estate has received a Certificate for Excellence from M/s J. Thomas & Company Private Limited for the highest CTC tea sold in Siliguri auction for a number of years. Tea cultivation area is 222 hectares, all of which is irrigated.

== Jay Shree Tea ==
The other tea gardens of the Jay Shree Tea & Industries Ltd., owned by the B.K.Birla group, in the Dooars-Terai region are: Kumarika, Marionbarie and Jayantika.
