= Danguajhar Tea Estate =

Tea plantation in India

- Interactive map of Danguajhar Tea Estate
- Location: Jalpaiguri district, West Bengal, India
- Nearest city: Jalpaiguri
- Coordinates: 26.5586°N 88.6994°E
- Owner: Goodricke
- Open: early 1900s

Danguajhar Tea Estate is a tea garden, located near Jalpaiguri in the Jalpaiguri Sadar subdivision of the Jalpaiguri district in the Indian state of West Bengal.

== Geography ==
Places and tea estates in Jalpaiguri Sadar subdivision (including Rajganj, Jalpaiguri, Maynaguri and Dhupguri CD blocks) in Jalpaiguri district
CT: census town, R: rural/ urban centre, N: neighbourhood, C: cantonment, NP: national park/ wildlife sanctuary, TE: tea estate
Abbreviations used in names – TG for Tea Garden (town/village), TE for Tea Estate, JRS: junction railway station
Owing to space constraints in the small map, the actual locations in a larger map may vary slightly

=== Location ===
The Teesta River flows on the eastern side of Danguajhar Tea Estate, and on the western side are the Karla Valley Tea Garden and Karla River. 10-12 'jhoras' or small streams pass through the flat landscape and fall into the Rukruka and Chukchuka rivulets.

=== Area overview ===
The map alongside shows the alluvial floodplains south of the outer foothills of the Himalayas. The area is mostly flat, except for low hills in the northern portions. It is a primarily rural area with 62.01% of the population living in rural areas and a moderate 37.99% living in the urban areas. Tea gardens in the Dooars and Terai regions produce 226 million kg or over a quarter of India's total tea crop. Some tea gardens were identified in the 2011 census as census towns or villages. Such places are marked in the map as CT (census town) or R (rural/ urban centre). Specific tea estate pages are marked TE.

Note: The map alongside presents some of the notable locations in the subdivision. All places marked in the map are linked in the larger full screen map.

== Etymology ==
The tea garden was initially planted as Rungamali Tea Estate, and later renamed as Danguajhar Tea Estate. ‘Danguajhar’ means bachelors’ den. The place was infested with malaria and black fever.‘Dengu’ is a disease and ‘Jar’ is fever.

== Dooars-Terai tea ==
Tea gardens in the Dooars and Terai regions produce 226 million kg or over a quarter of India's total tea crop. The Dooars region contains wild-life rich tropical forests, undulating plains and low hills. Innumerable streams and rivers descend from the mountains of Bhutan and flow through the fertile plains in the Dooars region. The elevation of the Dooars area ranges from 90 m to 1750 m and it receives around 350 cm of rain. The Dooars-Terai tea is characterized by a bright, smooth and full-bodied liquor that's a wee bit lighter than Assam tea. Cultivation of tea in the Dooars was primarily pioneered and promoted by the British but there was significant contribution of Indian entrepreneurs.

== The gardens ==
Denguajhar Tea Estate was established in the early 1900s. It is one of the largest producers of fine CTC tea and one of the few gardens to use machines for picking the leaves.

== Goodricke ==
Established in 1977, Goodricke owns 18 tea estates in India, all inherited from sterling tea companies, who operated from the late 1800s. Goodricke has 12 gardens in the Dooars. With its rich agro climate the area produces CTC tea. Goodricke’s tea gardens in the Dooars are: Danguajhar, Leesh River, Meenglas, Hope, Aibheel, Chulsa, Chalouni, Jiti, Sankos, Gandrapara, Lakhipara and Kumargram.

Eight sterling tea companies viz., The Assam-Doors Tea Co. Ltd., Hope Tea Co. Ltd., The Lebong Chulsa Tea Co. Ltd., The British Darjeeling Tea Co. Ltd., The Chulsa Tea Co. Ltd., The Leesh River Tea Co. Ltd., The Danguajhar Tea Co. Ltd., and The Meenglas Tea Co. Ltd., were amalgamated with Goodricke in 1977.
