= Gandrapara and Lakhipara Tea Estates =

Tea gardens in West Bengal, India

- Location: Jalpaiguri district, West Bengal, India
- Nearest city: Banarhat
- Owner: Goodricke
- Open: late 1800s/ early 1900s

Gandrapara Tea Estate and Lakhipara Tea Estate are tea gardens, located near each other in the Dhupguri CD block in the Jalpaiguri Sadar subdivision of the Jalpaiguri district in the Indian state of West Bengal. Both the tea estates are located in the north-central portion of the Dooars.

== Geography ==
Places and tea estates in Jalpaiguri Sadar subdivision (including Rajganj, Jalpaiguri, Maynaguri and Dhupguri CD blocks) in Jalpaiguri district
CT: census town, R: rural/ urban centre, N: neighbourhood, C: cantonment, NP: national park/ wildlife sanctuary, TE: tea estate
Abbreviations used in names – TG for Tea Garden (town/village), TE for Tea Estate, JRS: junction railway station
Owing to space constraints in the small map, the actual locations in a larger map may vary slightly

=== Location ===
Gandrapara Tea Estate is located at 26.80214°N 89.0036°E.

Gandrapara Tea Estate is located the hilly northern part of the district close to the Bhutan border.

Lakhipara Tea Estate is located at 26.82614°N 89.0148°E

Lakhipara Tea Estate is located in the misty hills close to the Bhutan border.

=== Area overview ===
The map alongside shows the alluvial floodplains south of the outer foothills of the Himalayas. The area is mostly flat, except for low hills in the northern portions. It is a primarily rural area with 62.01% of the population living in rural areas and a moderate 37.99% living in the urban areas. Tea gardens in the Dooars and Terai regions produce 226 million kg or over a quarter of India's total tea crop. Some tea gardens were identified in the 2011 census as census towns or villages. Such places are marked in the map as CT (census town) or R (rural/ urban centre). Specific tea estate pages are marked TE.

Note: The map alongside presents some of the notable locations in the subdivision. All places marked in the map are linked in the larger full screen map.

== Etymology ==
Gandrapara Tea Estate got its name from an illustrious Machia tribesman, Gandra Machia. the name Lakhipara means ‘the abode of Goddess Lakshmi’ in local languages.

== The gardens ==
Gandrapara Tea Garden was established in 1894. Parnell, the first manager planted 258 acres in 1895. Duncan Brothers were the owners since inception. Goodricke took it over in 1978.

Lakhipara Tea Estate produces CTC tea. It was established in 1912.

== Goodricke ==
Established in 1977, Goodricke owns 18 tea estates in India, all inherited from sterling tea companies, who operated from the late 1800s. Goodricke has 12 gardens in the Dooars. With its rich agro climate the area produces CTC tea. Goodricke’s tea gardens in the Dooars are: Danguajhar, Leesh River, Meenglas, Hope, Aibheel, Chulsa, Chalouni, Jiti, Sankos, Gandrapara, Lakhipara and Kumargram.

Eight sterling tea companies viz., The Assam-Doors Tea Co. Ltd., Hope Tea Co. Ltd., The Lebong Chulsa Tea Co. Ltd., The British Darjeeling Tea Co. Ltd., The Chulsa Tea Co. Ltd., The Leesh River Tea Co. Ltd., The Danguajhar Tea Co. Ltd., and The Meenglas Tea Co. Ltd., were amalgamated with Goodricke in 1977.

== Events ==
Gandrapara Tea Estate is at times visited by herds of elephants, in spite of barbed wire fencing to prevent the animals from entering the garden. On the other hand Lakhipara Tea Garden faces problems with leopards straying in.

Although, most of the better organised tea gardens go in for periodical wage revisions of the workers with the trade unions, there are people who protest against the daily wage, considered to be low by many people, prevalent in the tea gardens.
