= Darjeeling Old Cemetery =

Cemetery in West Bengal

Coordinates: 27.0526°N 88.2589°E

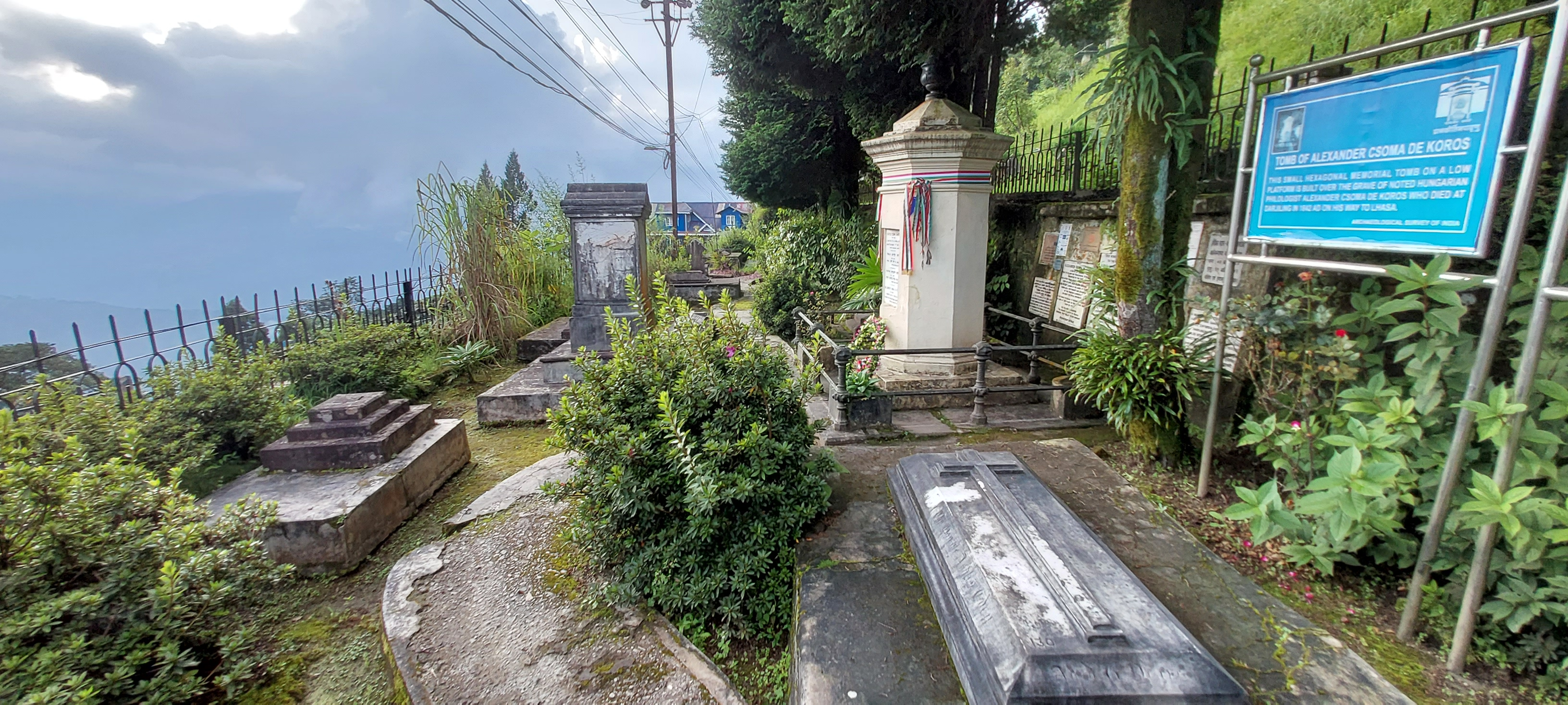
- Darjeeling Old Cemetery
- Interactive map of Darjeeling Old Cemetery

Details
- Established: 19th century
- Location: Lebong Cart road, Darjeeling, West Bengal
- Country: India
- Type: Christian cemetery
- No. of graves: almost 100 graves

Darjeeling Old Cemetery is a historical cemetery situated beside Lebong Cart Road in Darjeeling, in the Indian state of West Bengal.

== History ==
The cemetery was established during the British colonial period and contains the graves of European residents, army personnel, civil servants, tea planters, missionaries and their family members. It is one of the oldest burial site of Darjeeling district during the early period of development of Darjeeling under British administration. Currently the heritage cemetery is under the protection of Archaeological Survey of India.

== Notable graves ==
The Old Cemetery contains the graves of early European residents of Darjeeling, including:

- George William Aylmer Lloyd
- Sándor Kőrösi Csoma
- Louis Mandelli
- Mary Elizabeth Stoelke

== See more ==
- Kurseong Cemetery
- Darjeeling Himalayan Railway
- St. Andrew's Church, Darjeeling

== Gallery ==
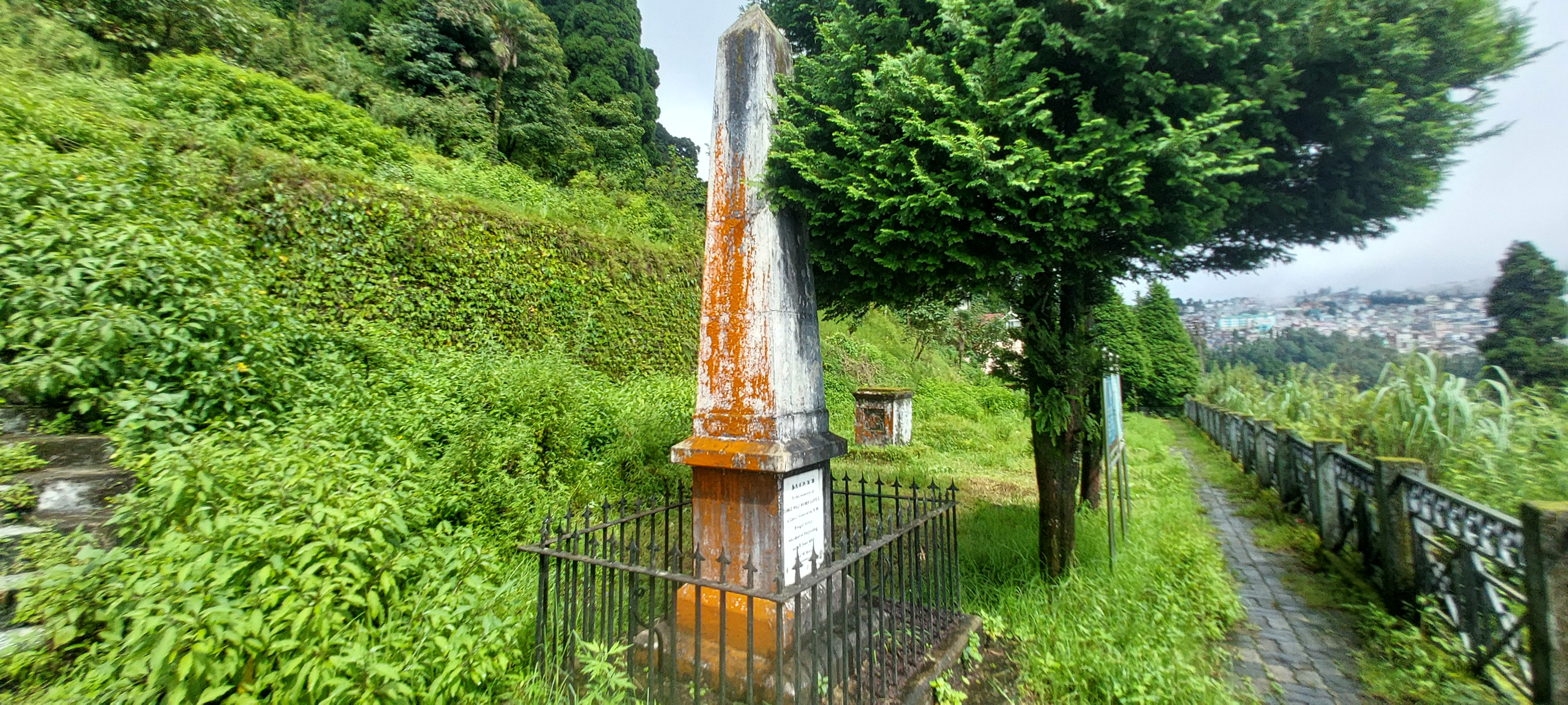
Tomb of General Aylmer Lloyd

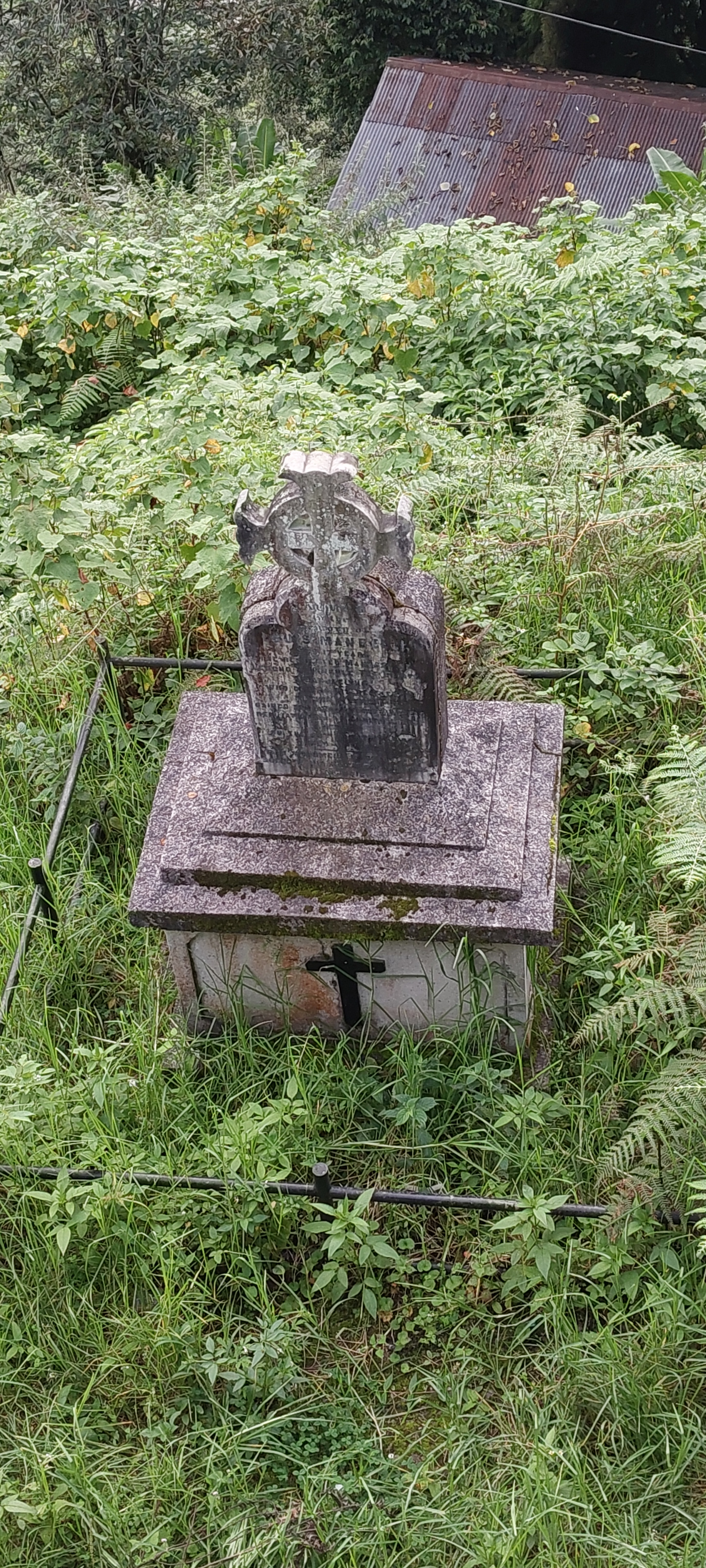
Grave of Louis Mandelli

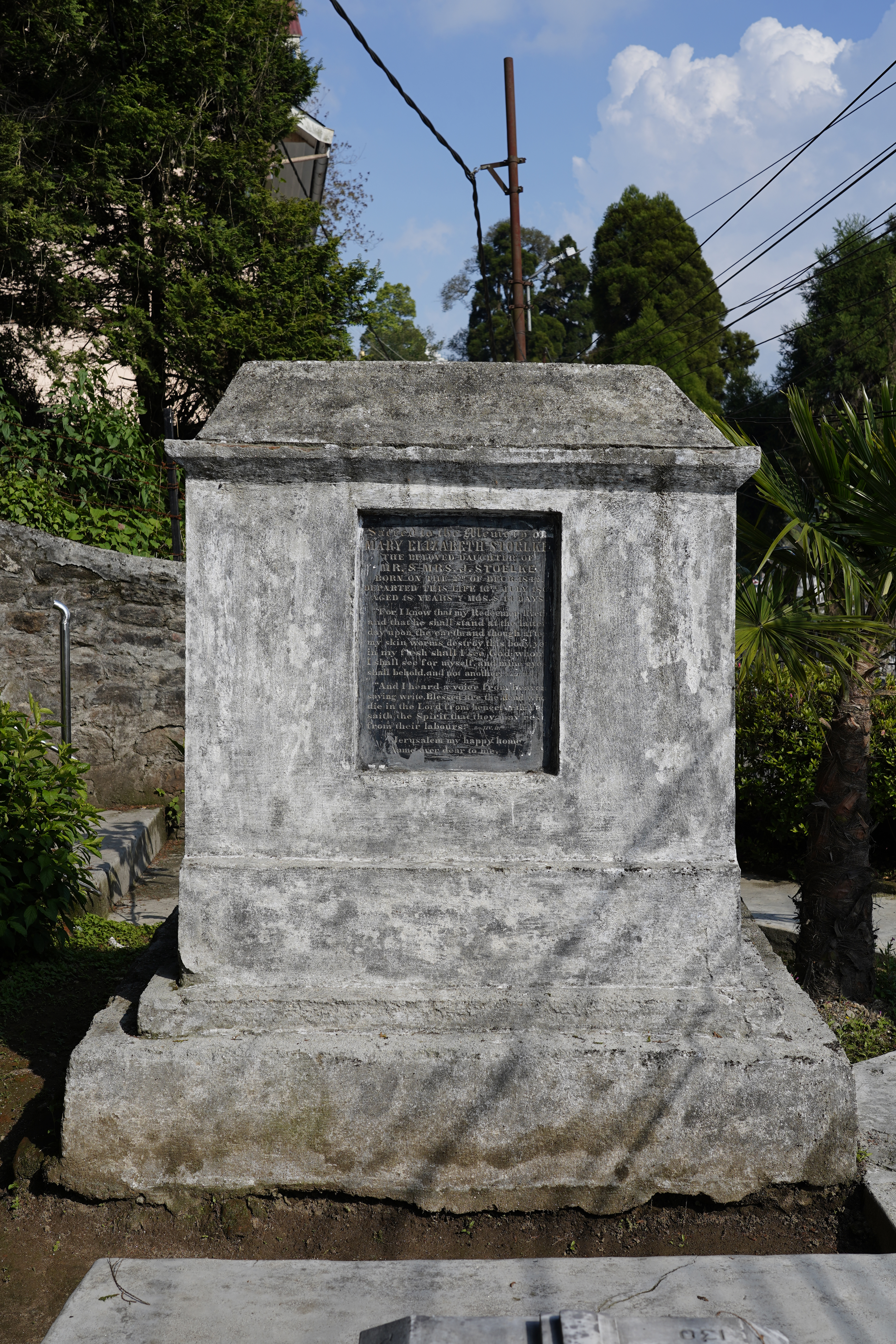
Tomb of Mary Elizabeth Stoelke

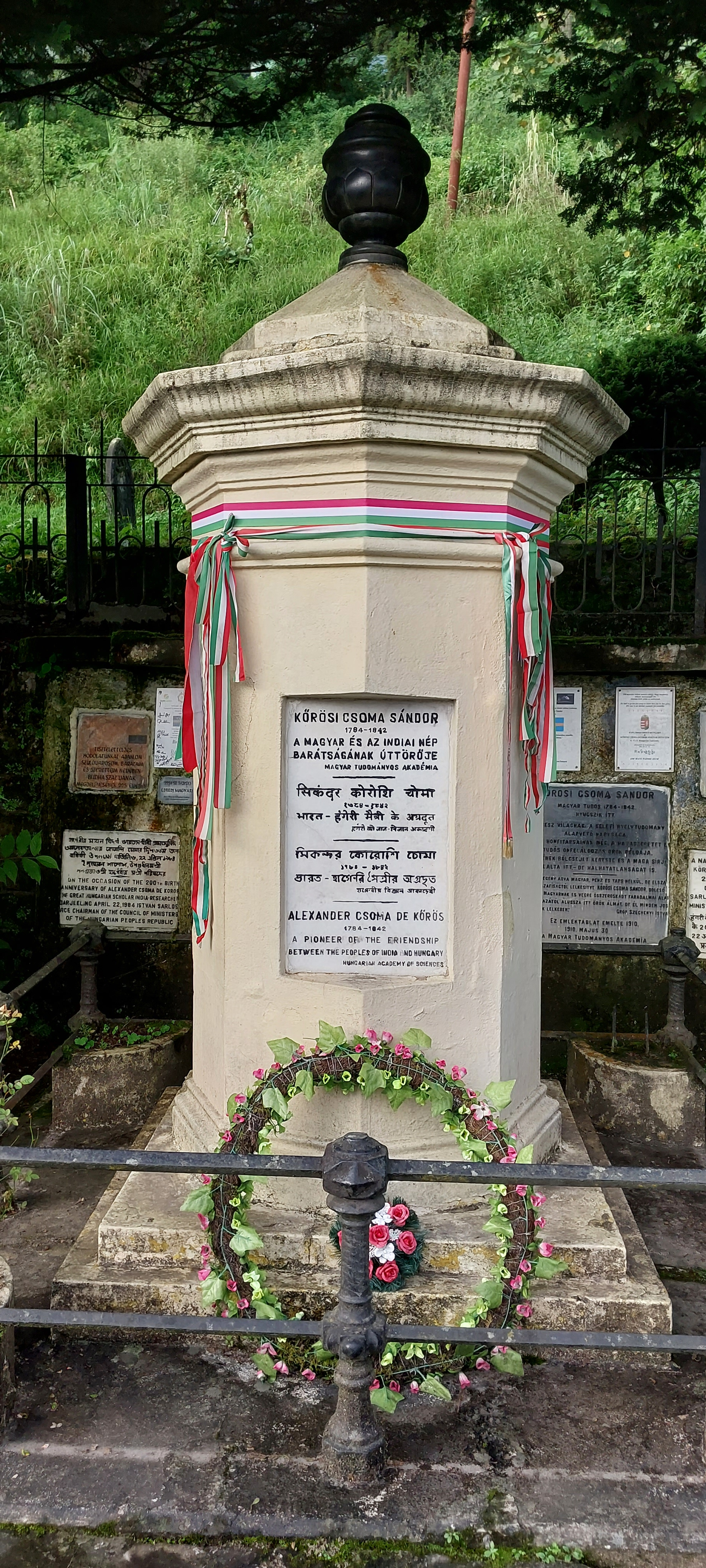
Sándor Kőrösi Csoma tomb

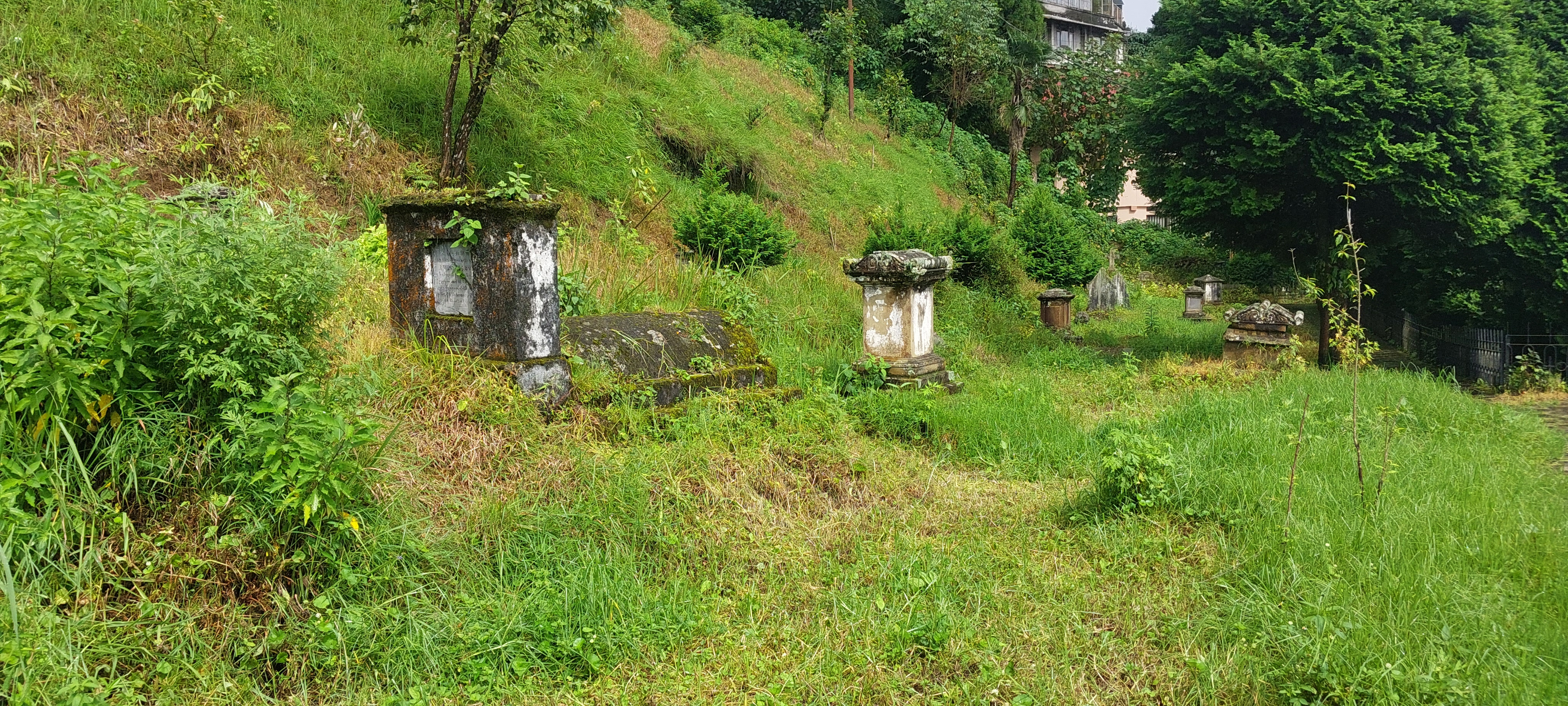
Unknown graves in the upper portion of Cemetery

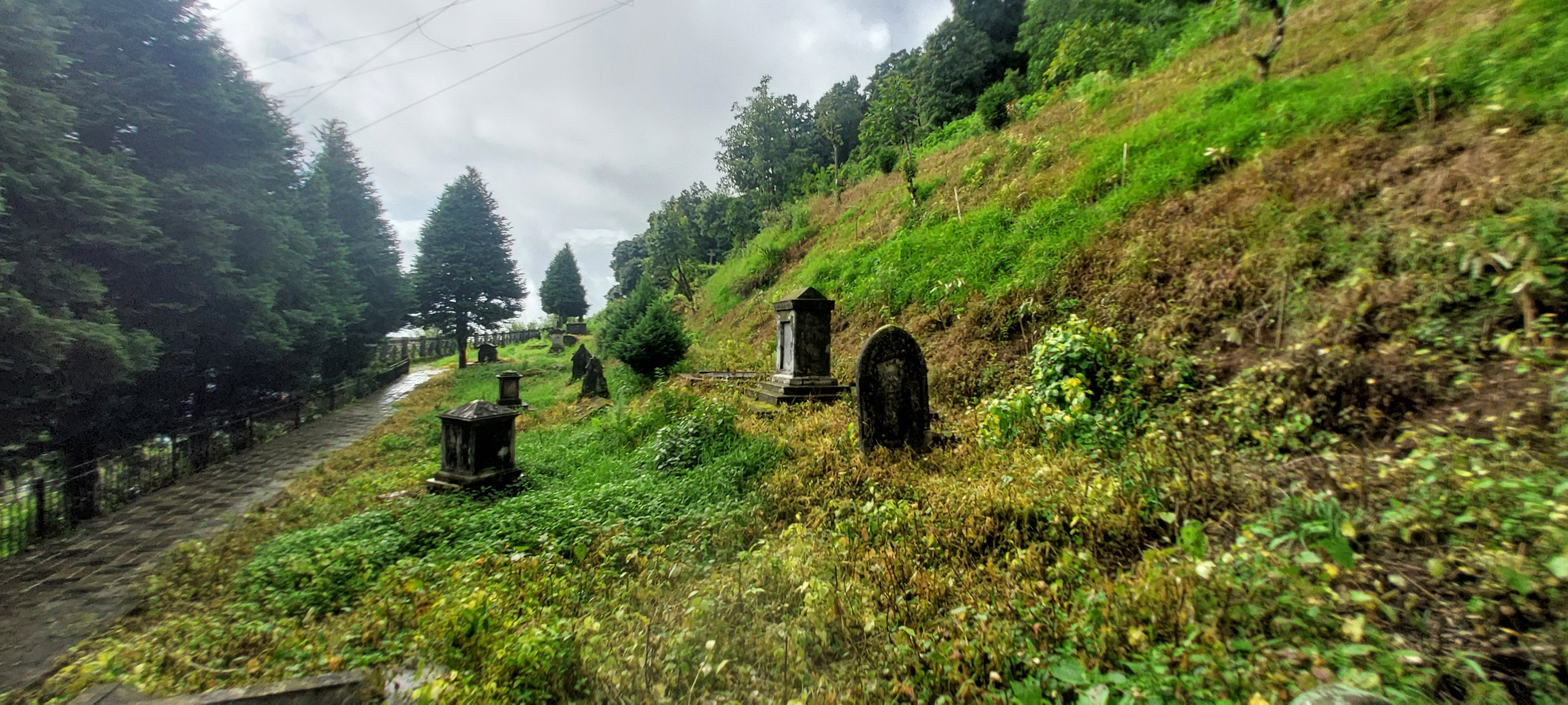
Graves in Darjeeling Old Cemetery
