= Chalouni, Aibheel and Chalsa Tea Estates =

Tea gardens in West Bengal, India

- Location: Jalpaiguri district, West Bengal, India
- Nearest city: Chalsa
- Elevation: 1,500 feet (460 m)
- Owner: Goodricke
- Open: late 1800s and early 1900s

Chalouni Tea Estate, Aibheel Tea Estate and Chalsa Tea Estate are tea gardens, located near each other in the Matiali CD block in the Malbazar subdivision of the Jalpaiguri district in the Indian state of West Bengal. All the three tea estates are located in the north-western section of the Dooars.

== Geography ==
Places and tea estates in Malbabazar subdivision (including Mal, Nagrakata and Matiali CD blocks) in Jalpaiguri district
CT: census town, R: rural/ urban centre, N: neighbourhood, NP: national park/ wildlife sanctuary, TE: tea estate
Abbreviations used in names – TG for Tea Garden (town/village), TE for Tea Estate, JRS: junction railway station
Owing to space constraints in the small map, the actual locations in a larger map may vary slightly

=== Location ===
Chalouni Tea Estate is located at 26.9631°N 88.7832°E.

Chalouni Tea Estate lies at an altitude of 1,500 feet, at the foot of a lower sub-Himalayan range.“Chalouni is scenically resplendent. To its north lies the Kalimpong Sub-Division reserve forest. The hills rise above into a chain of mountain ranges adding to the beauty of the garden. There are a number of rain-fed streamlets flowing north-south, which lace its body meandering and dancing to produce a musical symphony to add to its sylvan beauty and charm.” Chalouni has a common boundary with five tea gardens namely Samsing, Matelli, Nagaisuree, Engo and Zurantee.

Aibheel Tea Estate is located at 26.9133°N 88.7861°E

Aibheel Tea Estate is located in the foothills of Kalimpong-Bhutan range.

Chalsa Tea Estate is located at 26.9481°N 88.8377°E

Chalsa Tea Estate is located on the picturesque Chalsa Hill. On the east, the Murti River separates the tea estate from the Upper Tondu Forest. On the west is Matelli. The tea estate has undulating topography intercepted by mountain streams.

=== Area overview ===
Gorumara National Park has overtaken traditionally popular Jaldapara National Park in footfall and Malbazar has emerged as one of the most important towns in the Dooars. Malbazar subdivision is presented in the map alongside. It is a predominantly rural area with 88.62% of the population living in rural areas and 11.32% living in the urban areas. Tea gardens in the Dooars and Terai regions produce 226 million kg or over a quarter of India's total tea crop. Some tea gardens were identified in the 2011 census as census towns or villages. Such places are marked in the map as CT (census town) or R (rural/ urban centre). Specific tea estate pages are marked TE.

Note: The map alongside presents some of the notable locations in the subdivision. All places marked in the map are linked in the larger full screen map.

== Etymology ==
Chalouni Tea Estate was named after the chilloune tree that was quite common in the area.

Aibheel Tea Estate was earlier known as Sonapani as the natural spring waters appeared to be gold coloured.

== The gardens ==
Chalouni Tea Garden was established in 1885.

When the British took over the Dooars from Bhutan, Aibheel Tea Estate was leased out around 1890 to Sir Benjamin Simpson, who was medical officer of Sir Ashlay Eden's mission in Bhutan. His son, P.A.Simpson, managed the property from the earliest days to around 1920. The estate now is divided in to four divisions: Naya Kaman, Gunty Side, Sathkya and Dangee.

Duncan Brothers planted the Chalsa Tea Estate around 1910. It was subsequently taken over by Goodricke. It now has two divisions namely Gandrab and Main Division. The new factory commissioned in 1994 is amongst the best in the tea industry. The factory was HACCP certified in 2008 and upgraded in 2009.

== Goodricke ==
Established in 1977, Goodricke owns 18 tea estates in India, all inherited from sterling tea companies, who operated from the late 1800s. Goodricke has 12 gardens in the Dooars. With its rich agro climate the area produces CTC tea. Goodricke's tea gardens in the Dooars are: Danguajhar, Leesh River, Meenglas, Hope, Aibheel, Chulsa, Chalouni, Jiti, Sankos, Gandrapara, Lakhipara and Kumargram.

Eight sterling tea companies viz., The Assam-Doors Tea Co. Ltd., Hope Tea Co. Ltd., The Lebong Chulsa Tea Co. Ltd., The British Darjeeling Tea Co. Ltd., The Chulsa Tea Co. Ltd., The Leesh River Tea Co. Ltd., The Danguajhar Tea Co. Ltd., and The Meenglas Tea Co. Ltd., were amalgamated with Goodricke in 1977.
