= Kumargram and Sankos Tea Estates =

Tea gardens in West Bengal

- Location: Alipurduar district, West Bengal, India
- Nearest city: Kumargram
- Owner: Goodricke
- Open: 1895–96

Kumargram Tea Estate and Sankos Tea Estate are tea gardens, located in the Kumargram CD block in the Alipurduar subdivision of the Alipurduar district in the Indian state of West Bengal.

== Geography ==
Places and tea estates in the eastern portion of Alipurdar subdivision (including Kalchini, Kumargram and Alipuduar II CD blocks) in Alipurduar district
CT: census town, R: rural/ urban centre, N: neighbourhood, A: Air Force Station, NP: national park/ wildlife sanctuary, TE: tea estate, H: historical site
Abbreviations used in names – TG for Tea Garden (town/village), TE for Tea Estate
Owing to space constraints in the small map, the actual locations in a larger map may vary slightly

=== Location ===
Kumargram Tea Estate is located at 26.6736°N 89.8263°E.

Kumargram Tea Estate is located in the extreme north-eastern corner of the state with the Bhutan hills in the north. It is a fertile zone with many tea gardens and paddy fields.

Sankos Tea Estate is located at 26.6632°N 89.8553°E.

Sankos Tea Estate is located in the eastern end of the Dooars, bordering Assam.

=== Area overview ===
Alipurduar district is covered by two maps. It is an extensive area in the eastern end of the Dooars in West Bengal. It is undulating country, largely forested, with numerous rivers flowing down from the outer ranges of the Himalayas in Bhutan. It is a predominantly rural area with 79.38% of the population living in the rural areas. The district has 1 municipal town and 20 census towns and that means that 20.62% of the population lives in the urban areas. The scheduled castes and scheduled tribes, taken together, form more than half the population in all the six community development blocks in the district. There is a high concentration of tribal people (scheduled tribes) in the three northern blocks of the district.

Note: The map alongside presents some of the notable locations in the subdivision. All places marked in the map are linked in the larger full screen map.

== Etymology ==
The Sankos River, flowing along the eastern boundary of the garden, lends its name to the garden. “Interestingly, the name Sankos may have been derived from the words Swarn - Kosh meaning gold reserves. According to native folklore, large quantities of gold lie buried deep in the river bed”.

== The garden ==
Kumargram Tea Estate was established in 1896. It is one of the jewels of Dooars gardens both in terms of quality and quantity.

Sankos Tea Estate was establishedin 1895-96.

== Goodricke ==
Established in 1977, Goodricke owns 18 tea estates in India, all inherited from sterling tea companies, who operated from the late 1800s. Goodricke has 12 gardens in the Dooars. With its rich agro climate the area produces CTC tea. Goodricke’s tea gardens in the Dooars are: Danguajhar, Leesh River, Meenglas, Hope, Aibheel, Chulsa, Chalouni, Jiti, Sankos, Gandrapara, Lakhipara and Kumargram.

Eight sterling tea companies viz., The Assam-Doors Tea Co. Ltd., Hope Tea Co. Ltd., The Lebong Chulsa Tea Co. Ltd., The British Darjeeling Tea Co. Ltd., The Chulsa Tea Co. Ltd., The Leesh River Tea Co. Ltd., The Danguajhar Tea Co. Ltd., and The Meenglas Tea Co. Ltd., were amalgamated with Goodricke in 1977.
