= Hope and Jiti Tea Estates =

Tea gardens in West Bengal

- Location: Jalpaiguri district, West Bengal, India
- Nearest city: Nagrakata
- Elevation: 1,200 feet (370 m)
- Owner: Goodricke
- Open: late 1800s

Hope Tea Estate and Jiti Tea Estate are tea gardens, located near each other in the Nagrakata CD block in the Malbazar subdivision of the Jalpaiguri district in the Indian state of West Bengal. Both the tea estates are located in the north-central section of the Dooars.

== Geography ==
Places and tea estates in Malbabazar subdivision (including Mal, Nagrakata and Matiali CD blocks) in Jalpaiguri district
CT: census town, R: rural/ urban centre, N: neighbourhood, NP: national park/ wildlife sanctuary, TE: tea estate
Abbreviations used in names – TG for Tea Garden (town/village), TE for Tea Estate, JRS: junction railway station
Owing to space constraints in the small map, the actual locations in a larger map may vary slightly

=== Location ===
Hope Tea Estate is located at 26.9668°N 88.9196°E.

Hope Tea Estate lies at the foot of the Sivalik Hills of the outer Himalayas. The Tea Estate is situated at a height of about 1,200 ft. Tea has been planted in the Eastern Division with very steep slopes. The estate receives an average of 450 cm of rain. As a result of its proximity to the hills, the climate remains cool and temperate even in summer. The view towards the north, along the Bhutan border is very picturesque.

Jit Tea Estate is located at 26.9818°N 88.9276°E

Jiti Tea Estate lies a serene valley bordering the foothills of the Himalayan kingdom of Bhutan. Hope Tea Estate lies to the south of Jiti Tea Estate. While the Ghatia River flows along its western border, the Jiti River flows on the eastern side. The area receives excessive rainfall and is cooler than other parts of the Dooars. The unique climatic conditions help in producing high quality tea leaves.

=== Area overview ===
Gorumara National Park has overtaken traditionally popular Jaldapara National Park in footfall and Malbazar has emerged as one of the most important towns in the Dooars. Malbazar subdivision is presented in the map alongside. It is a predominantly rural area with 88.62% of the population living in rural areas and 11.32% living in the urban areas. Tea gardens in the Dooars and Terai regions produce 226 million kg or over a quarter of India's total tea crop. Some tea gardens were identified in the 2011 census as census towns or villages. Such places are marked in the map as CT (census town) or R (rural/ urban centre). Specific tea estate pages are marked TE.

Note: The map alongside presents some of the notable locations in the subdivision. All places marked in the map are linked in the larger full screen map.

== Etymology ==
Hope Tea Estate was named after the daughter of the major share holder of the Hope Tea Company.

== The gardens ==
Hope Tea Garden was planted around 1878 and the first tea factory came up by 1880 at Thal Khola. In the earlier days tea leaves were carried down to the factory in bullock carts, but around 1886 the factory was shifted to its present site. Initially, the Santals were deployed in the Hope Tea Garden but from around 1880, Adivasis from Chhotanagapur were brought here . While the Gorkha community had been living here before the tea plantations .

Jiti Tea Estate was founded in 1878 as a part of the Hope Tea Estate and initially the green tea leaves were carried to the Hope factory. It got its own factory in 1878.

== Goodricke ==
Established in 1977, Goodricke owns 18 tea estates in India, all inherited from sterling tea companies, who operated from the late 1800s. Goodricke has 12 gardens in the Dooars. With its rich agro climate the area produces CTC tea. Goodricke’s tea gardens in the Dooars are: Danguajhar, Leesh River, Meenglas, Hope, Aibheel, Chulsa, Chalouni, Jiti, Sankos, Gandrapara, Lakhipara and Kumargram.

Eight sterling tea companies viz., The Assam-Doors Tea Co. Ltd., Hope Tea Co. Ltd., The Lebong Chulsa Tea Co. Ltd., The British Darjeeling Tea Co. Ltd., The Chulsa Tea Co. Ltd., The Leesh River Tea Co. Ltd., The Danguajhar Tea Co. Ltd., and The Meenglas Tea Co. Ltd., were amalgamated with Goodricke in 1977.

== Tourism ==
Nagrakata, 75 km from Siliguri, has been a major hub of tea trading, with numerous tea gardens in the area – Chengmari, Kurti, Bhagatpur, Nagrakata, Jiti, Hope, Naya Sailee, Hilla, Grassmore, Ghatia, Loosan, Dharnipur and many others. With so many tea gardens in the area, Nagrakata has started attracting tourists.
