= Louis Mandelli =

Italian settler in India, tea planter and amateur zoologist

Louis Hildebrand Mandelli (1833–1880) was an Italian settler in India, a tea planter and amateur zoologist and ornithologist. Living in Darjeeling and collecting specimens of birds and animals around Sikkim, he discovered many species from the region and several were named after him. He is honoured in the names Locustella mandelli, Mandelli's Snowfinch and Mandelli's mouse-eared bat.

== Biography ==
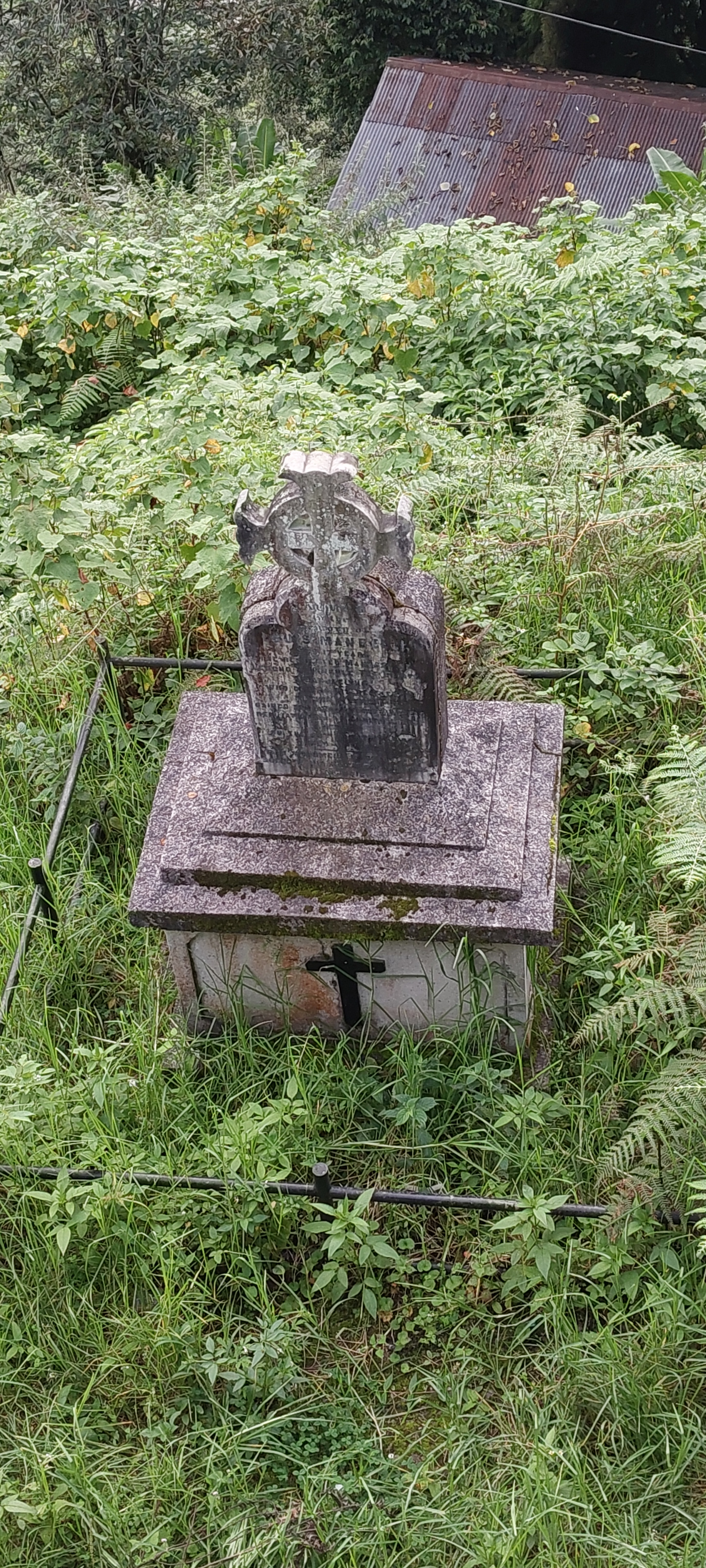
Grave of Mandelli in Old Cemetery of Darjeeling

It is surmised that he may have been born Louis Castelnuovo, from an aristocratic Maltese family, and that his father Jerome took up his mother's family name possibly to get away from an association with Giuseppe Garibaldi. Mandelli obtained a contract as a manager for Lebong and Minchu Tea Company at Darjeeling at the end of 1864. He married Ann Jones at Darjeeling on 21 January 1865. The tea plantation was taken over by the Land Mortgage Bank of India around 1868 and Mandelli also became in-charge of Mineral Spring. In 1872 he came to manage Chontong Tea Estate, thus managing 1350 acres in all. In 1880 he obtained a property at Darjeeling which came to be called "Mandelligunge".

In 1871 he is noted as the owner of Bycemaree estate (70 acres) in Siliguri along with W.R. Martin and in 1873 the two partners acquired another 160 acres at Munjha but sold it off in 1875 obtaining the 200 acre Kyel tea estate in 1876.

Mandelli's main ornithological mentor was William Edwin Brooks although he was in greater contact with another bird collector who worked in the Indian Civil Services, Andrew Anderson. Anderson's main contributions were on the birds of Fatehgarh where he was a District Judge. Mandelli hired local hunters to obtain specimens for him. He had one team collect in the Buxa Doars around Christmas of 1875. Brooks in his note on Tribura mandelli bemoans the fact that the birds had not been sexed when preparing skins. Brooks also noted that Mandelli never collected the birds himself. In 1875, he also began collecting eggs.

Mandelli claimed in a letter to Anderson that he had sent 5000 skins to Hume, receiving in turn 800 skins of what he said were worthless common Indian birds of which 400 he disposed down the local hillside. Yes, Hume is a brute, in fact I call him a swindler as far as birds are concerned. (Mandelli to Anderson 28 January 1876) In Hume's defence it has been noted that all credit was given to Mandelli, several species being named after him. The one description that Mandelli' made on his own was through the assistance of Brooks.

Mandelli was elected a member of the Asiatic Society of Bengal on 5 December 1877. Mandelli died of unknown causes in February 1880, possibly led by poor health, dismissal from the tea estate as well as financial troubles. Sharpe [18], who received 13 bird specimens from Mandelli, said that he committed suicide. Mandelli's bird collections were then purchased by Hume and was donated to the British Museum and are now in the Natural History Museum at Tring. Mandelli is buried in the Darjeeling Old Cemetery a mile from Chowrasta with the misleading inscription "Mr. Mandelli, ornithologist, appointed by the Italian Government to report on birds of the eastern Himalayas."

His oldest son, also a Louis Mandelli became a travelling inspector in the railways. An early biographical entry on Mandelli by E.C. Dozey notes that he had three daughters. Fred Pinn, who wrote the only major biography of Mandelli identifies several defects in this source.

== Works ==
- Mandelli, L. (1873). "New birds from Sikhim". Stray Feathers. 1 (5): 415–416.

== Notes ==
18. Sharpe, B. B. 1906. Birds. In: The History of the Collections contained in the Natural History Departments of the British Museum, Vol. 2. Trustees of the British Museum, London, pp. 79-515.
