= Dheklapara Tea Garden =

- Village
- Location in West Bengal, India Dheklapara Tea Garden (India)
- Coordinates: 26.7681°N 89.1048°E
- Country: India
- State: West Bengal
- District: Alipurduar

Population (2011)
  - Total: 2,641
- Time zone: UTC+5:30 (IST)
- PIN: 735204
- Telephone/STD code: 03561
- Vehicle registration: WB
- Lok Sabha constituency: Alipurduars
- Vidhan Sabha constituency: Madarihat
- Website: alipurduar.gov.in

Dheklapara Tea Garden is a village in the Madarihat Birpara CD block in the Alipurduar subdivision of the Alipurduar district in the state of West Bengal, India.

== Geography ==
Places and tea estates in the western portion of Alipurdar subdivision (including Madarihat-Birpara, Falakata and Alipuduar I CD blocks) in Alipurduar district
CT: census town, R: rural/ urban centre, N: neighbourhood, NP: national park/ wildlife sanctuary, TE: tea estate
Abbreviations used in names – TG for Tea Garden (town/village), TE for Tea Estate
Owing to space constraints in the small map, the actual locations in a larger map may vary slightly

=== Location ===
Dheklapara Tea Garden is located at 26.7681°N 89.1048°E.

=== Area overview ===
Alipurduar district is covered by two maps. It is an extensive area in the eastern end of the Dooars in West Bengal. It is undulating country, largely forested, with numerous rivers flowing down from the outer ranges of the Himalayas in Bhutan. It is a predominantly rural area with 79.38% of the population living in the rural areas. The district has 1 municipal town and 20 census towns and that means that 20.62% of the population lives in urban areas. The scheduled castes and scheduled tribes, taken together, form more than half the population in all the six community development blocks in the district. There is a high concentration of tribal people (scheduled tribes) in the three northern blocks of the district.

== Demographics ==
As per the 2011 Census of India, Dheklapara Tea Garden had a total population of 2,641. There were 1,321 (50%) males and 1,322 (50%) females. There were 366 persons in the age range of 0 to 6 years. The total number of literate people in Dheklapara Tea Garden was 1,349 (59.24% of the population over 6 years).

== Economy ==
Dheklapara Tea Estate, with 656 workers, was shut down in 2002. One report puts it succinctly, "The tea estate closed down in 2002 after the owner quit the business. But the workers, some 600 men and women, almost all of them Adivasis, did not leave. They clung on in the hope of a revival. Organising themselves into committees, they started plucking leaves to sell to outside buyers. But the economics of tea do not support direct sales. At best, what the workers sell is good enough to fetch them Rs 35 a day, a third of the regular wage."

Subsequently, the state government has been providing a monthly assistance of Rs.1,500 to each permanent worker of the locked out gardens. There are about 10,000 jobless workers and their families in nine closed tea gardens in the dooars. Everybody is assured of two plain meals in a day.
