= Bandapani Tea Garden =

- Village
- Location in West Bengal, India Bandapani Tea Garden (India)
- Coordinates: 26.7841°N 89.1057°E
- Country: India
- State: West Bengal
- District: Alipurduar

Population (2011)
  - Total: 5,390
- Time zone: UTC+5:30 (IST)
- PIN: 735204
- Telephone/STD code: 03561
- Vehicle registration: WB
- Lok Sabha constituency: Alipurduars
- Vidhan Sabha constituency: Madarihat
- Website: alipurduar.gov.in

Bandapani Tea Garden is a village and a gram panchayat in the Madarihat Birpara CD block in the Alipurduar subdivision of the Alipurduar district in the state of West Bengal, India.

== Geography ==
Places and tea estates in the western portion of Alipurdar subdivision (including Madarihat-Birpara, Falakata and Alipuduar I CD blocks) in Alipurduar district
CT: census town, R: rural/ urban centre, N: neighbourhood, NP: national park/ wildlife sanctuary, TE: tea estate
Abbreviations used in names – TG for Tea Garden (town/village), TE for Tea Estate
Owing to space constraints in the small map, the actual locations in a larger map may vary slightly

=== Location ===
Bandapani Tea Garden is located at 26.7841°N 89.1057°E.

=== Area overview ===
Alipurduar district is covered by two maps. It is an extensive area in the eastern end of the Dooars in West Bengal. It is undulating country, largely forested, with numerous rivers flowing down from the outer ranges of the Himalayas in Bhutan. It is a predominantly rural area with 79.38% of the population living in the rural areas. The district has 1 municipal town and 20 census towns and that means that 20.62% of the population lives in urban areas. The scheduled castes and scheduled tribes, taken together, form more than half the population in all the six community development blocks in the district. There is a high concentration of tribal people (scheduled tribes) in the three northern blocks of the district.

== Demographics ==
As per the 2011 Census of India, Bandapani Tea Garden had a total population of 5,390. There were 2,756 (51%) males and 2,634 (49%) females. There were 741 persons in the age range of 0 to 6 years. The total number of literate people in Bandapani Tea Garden was 2,940 (63.24% of the population over 6 years).

== Economy ==
Established in 1895, Bandapani Tea Garden was closed in 2013. The 1,000 hectare tea garden used to employ 1,667 people and produce 6 lakh kg of tea annually. It was originally owned by the Darjeeling Dooars Plantation Limited. They sold it to Mohta Enterprises. Then it was taken over by Sarada Pleasure and Adventure Limited, a Siliguri-based hotel, who had no experience in running a tea garden.

Adivasis from Chotanagpur form a sizeable section of the workers in the tea gardens in the area. Dumka, Hazaribagh, Ranchi and Chaibasa formed one of the biggest catchment areas for tea garden labour in the twilight years of the 19th century. "The notorious coolie trade under colonial rule exploited the dispossession, indebtedness and despair of Adivasis to transport them, often by force or deception, as far as Assam or the Dooars – or even further afield to plantations in Trinidad, Guyana, South Africa and Malaya. A century and a half later, these communities are on the move again. The moribund economy of the Dooars region has rendered these communities vulnerable yet again."

The state government has been providing a monthly assistance of Rs.1,500 to each permanent worker of the locked out gardens. There are about 10,000 jobless workers and their families in nine closed tea gardens in the dooars. Everybody is assured of two plain meals in a day.
