= Mandelli Sistemi =

Italian mechanical parts company (e. 1932)

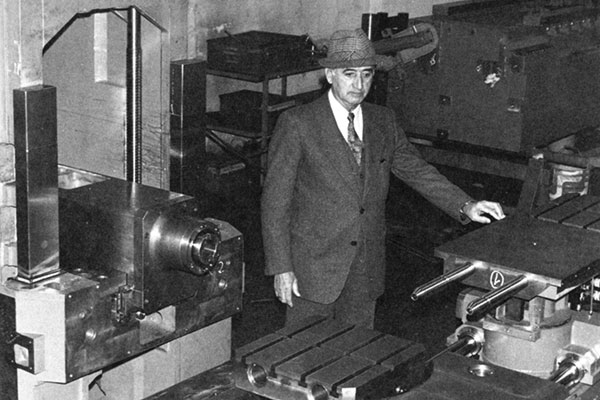
- Founder Renato Mandelli in 1932
- Type: Private
- Founded: 1932
- Founders: Renato Mandelli
- Key people: Giancarlo Mandelli; Sante Mandelli; Umberto Mandelli
- Products: Machine tools; Horizontal profilers for titanium machining; Horizontal 5-axis multitasking machining centers
- Owner: Allied Group
- Number of employees: 49 (2021); 51 (2022)
- Website: www.mandelli.com

Mandelli Sistemi S.p.A. is an Italian company designed for the precision machining of mechanical parts. Since its founding in 1932, the company has become a benchmark in the mechanical automation market as a precision workshop for machining, milling, turning, boring, and tooling design.

== History ==
=== Creation ===
The company was founded by Renato Mandelli in 1932 in Piacenza, Italy. In 1960, Renato Mandelli associated his three sons—Sante, Giancarlo, and Umberto Mandelli—into managing the business. That year, the company became Officina Mandelli S.n.c., and focused on producing machine tools (POSITIV, MEDAL, and THEMA) and constructing the first core of its current plant.

At the 1967 Milan Fair, Giancarlo, Sante, and Umberto brought the first numerically controlled machine to the market, later called a "revolutionary" product because it coupled mechanical parts with the first elementary computerized brain.

During the exposition, Giancarlo Mandelli stated: "In 1967 we started from where the most advanced companies had arrived. Even then, our first strategic choice was to focus on research by regularly investing a significant share of its revenues. This year, for example, we will commit 12 percent of our revenues to this area, which is well above average."

=== Expansion ===
Due to investments in research and innovation, the company experienced a vast expansion in the 1980s.

In the following years, Mandelli began manufacturing with a new 5-axis horizontal machining center concept, later called the SPARK Line. The SPARK X became the new production model due to its novel use of three linear axes of motion on one side opposite the workpiece. The company quickly achieved a significant knowledge base, allowing it to move from a mechanical company to a mechatronics company. After commissioning market research, the three brothers realized that the future of the industry would be in machine tools; that is, the production of tools needed to build other machines, like cars, tractors, and washing machines. This led to the company producing everything in-house and designing all their devices' electronics directly in their factory.

This new approach resulted in three significant achievements for the company:

1. The same line could be used to manufacture different parts of the same product family.
2. A flexible manufacturing system (FMS) could be easily converted for different types of production.
3. Production rates could be varied as needed.

The results enabled the company to reach several important customers, such as IBM, Rolls-Royce, Iveco, Volvo, John Deere, Caterpillar, and Ferrari. In 1984, the company transferred a license to the Japanese manufacturing company Amada to produce two machines designed entirely in Italy. Also in the same year, a second plant was added in Avellino, called Mandelli 2. In just five years (1983–1988), the company tripled its revenue.

In the mid-1980s, the company collaborated with IBM to create a research center known as 'Spring' (Studi e Progetti per l' Ingegneria della Fabbrica Automatica). This research center was made available to all companies in the machine tool industry by sharing designs, models, and even prototypes.

In 1989, Mandelli Sistemi went public on the Milan Stock Exchange's Piazza Affari list.

=== Crisis ===
In the early 1990s, however, the company entered a debt crisis that led to financial collapse in 1995. After bankruptcy, it spent the next two years under controlled administration, which oversaw the company's restructuring and revitalization. The administration consisted of five investors—investment bank M.M. Warburg & Co.⁣, robotic automation company Sitindustrie, Pllb electronics, industrial holding company Finatan S.p.A., and new CEO Andrea Mattarelli (started January 1996), each of whom retained a stake of about 20 percent—and was led by Victor Uckmar.

The story of the bankruptcy and the charges and subsequent convictions that were brought and upheld by the European Court of Human Rights in Strasbourg against members of the Mandelli family was told in the book Institutes Discredit, written by Angelo Santoro and Biagio Riccio.

The company was acquired in 2000 by the Riello Sistemi Group, with a commitment to regrow new, leaner processes and focus on the innovation that marked it before the crisis.

In 2021, after more than two decades of management, the company seriously challenged the brand's strength due to poor markets and the effects of the COVID-19 pandemic on its aerospace customers Boeing and Airbus. The management decided to sell to the Italian manufacturing group Allied Group (managed by group president Valter Alberici) through an auction. The new owners pledged to keep the jobs of all 49 employees, giving continuity to the installed machines—a priority issue from the beginning.

== Products ==
In 1965, the first machine tools were built: POSITIV, MEDAL, and THEMA. The first core of the current factory was also established. That year also saw the construction of EGO, the first machine with basic features for a machining center. The workshop also became a joint-stock company.

The REGENT line was introduced in 1970. It was a modular generation that could be integrated into more complex systems. At the same time, the first experiences with machining unique materials typical of the aviation industry, such as titanium, began.

In 1975, the first flexible production and business development system (FMS) was implemented.

In 1980, the first numerically controlled product, called 'Plasma', was developed in the new machining center called QUASAR, the work of well-known architects Ettore Sottsass and Matteo Thun.
