= St. Andrew's Church, Darjeeling =

Church in West Bengal

Coordinates: 27°02′53″N 88°16′01″E

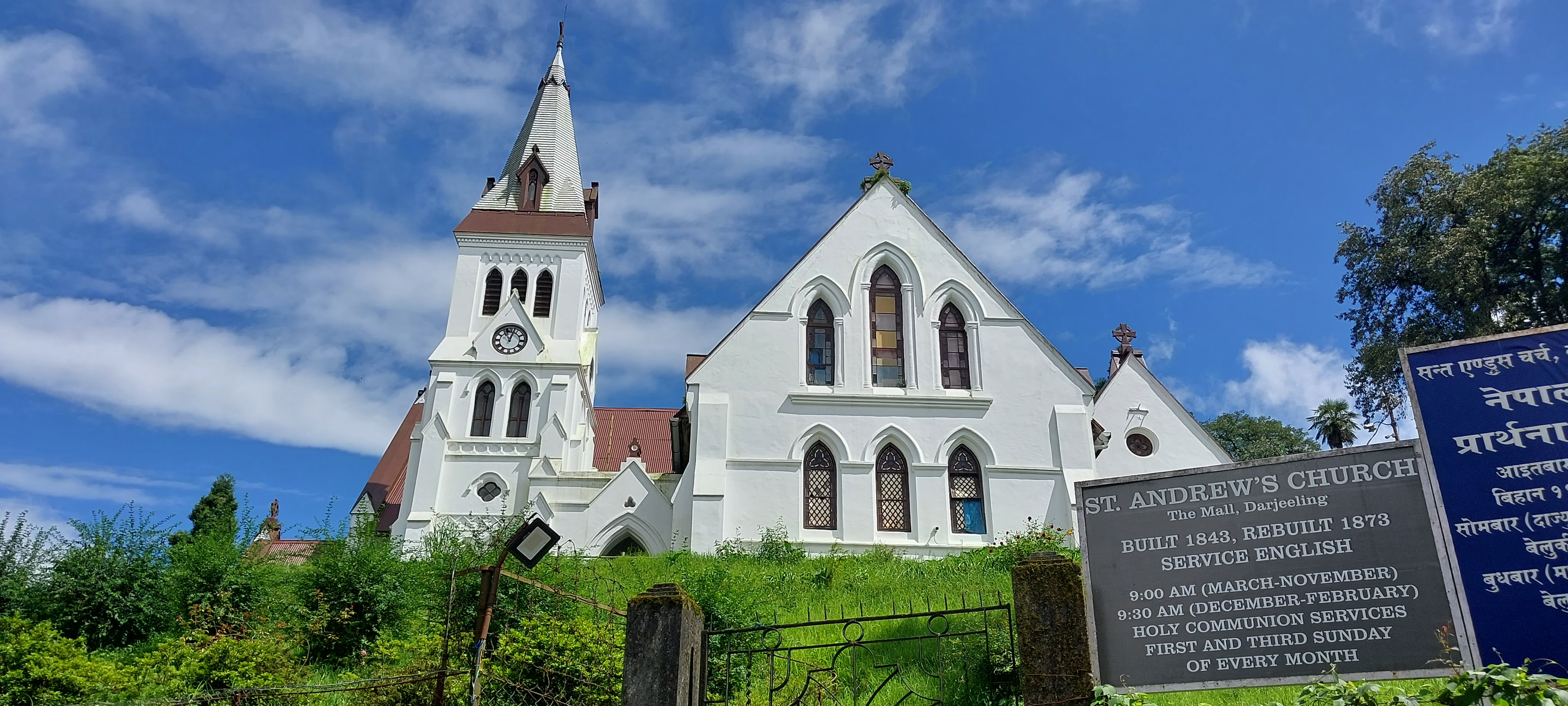
- St. Andrew's Church, Darjeeling front view
- St. Andrew's Church, Darjeeling
- Location: Darjeeling, West Bengal
- Country: India
- Denomination: Anglican

History
- Status: Cathedral
- Founded: 1843; 183 years ago

Architecture
- Functional status: Active

Administration
- Diocese: Darjeeling

St. Andrew's Church is a heritage Anglican church situated in Darjeeling, in the Indian state of West Bengal. Established on 30 November 1843, it is the oldest church in Darjeeling. Worshippers at St. Andrew's were principally the Scottish soldiers and tea planters resided in Darjeeling town.

After heavy damage sustained by a devastating lightning strike in 1867, it was rebuilt in 1873. The clock tower of the St. Andrew's Church was built in 1883.
