= Crush, tear, curl =

Method of processing tea

Crush, tear, curl (sometimes cut, tear, curl) is a method of processing tea leaves into black tea in which the leaves are passed through a series of cylindrical rollers with hundreds of sharp teeth that crush, tear, and curl the tea into small, hard pellets. This replaces the final stage of orthodox tea manufacture, in which the leaves are rolled into strips. Tea produced using this method is generally called CTC tea or mamri tea.

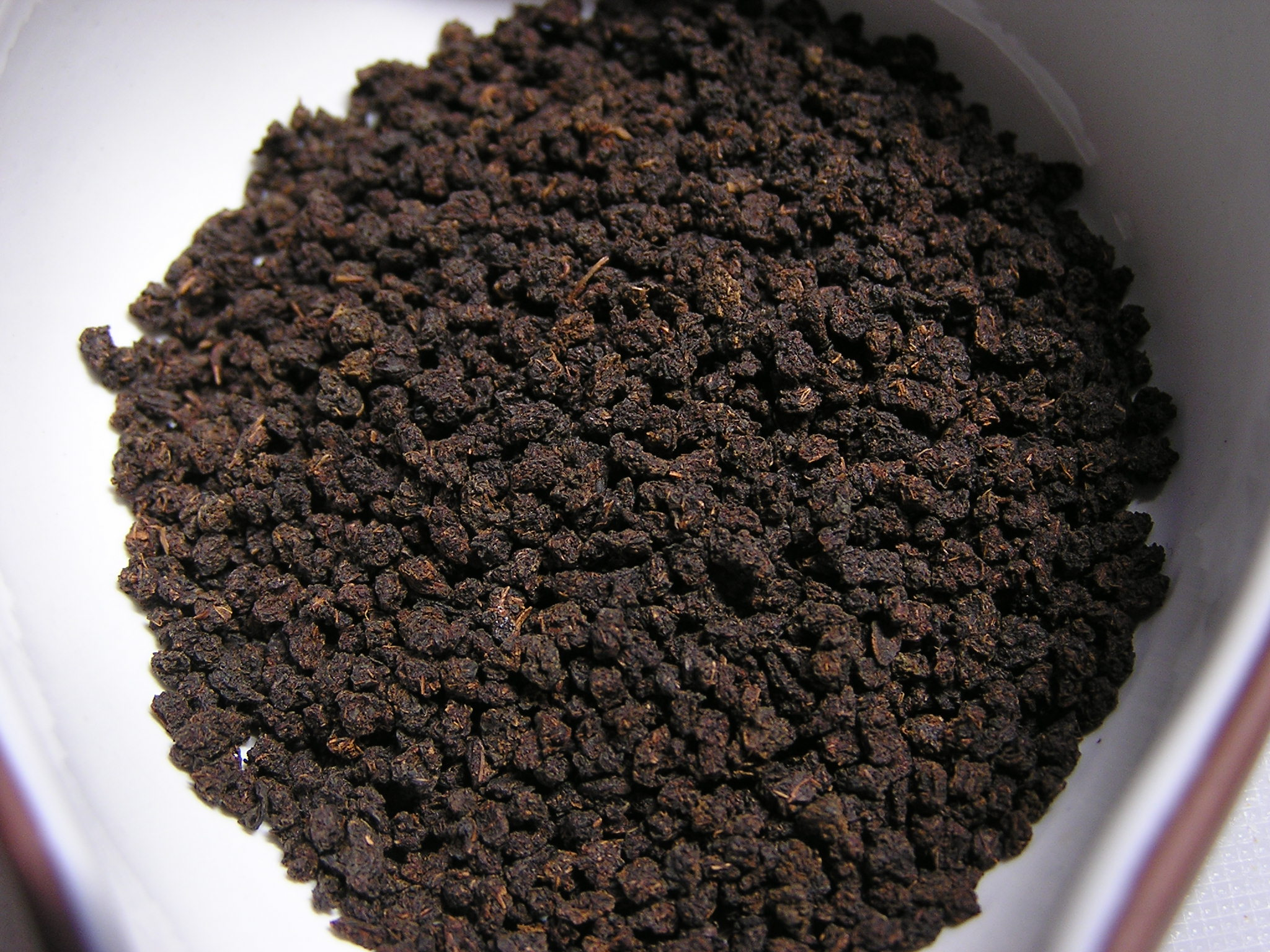
Black tea produced using the CTC method

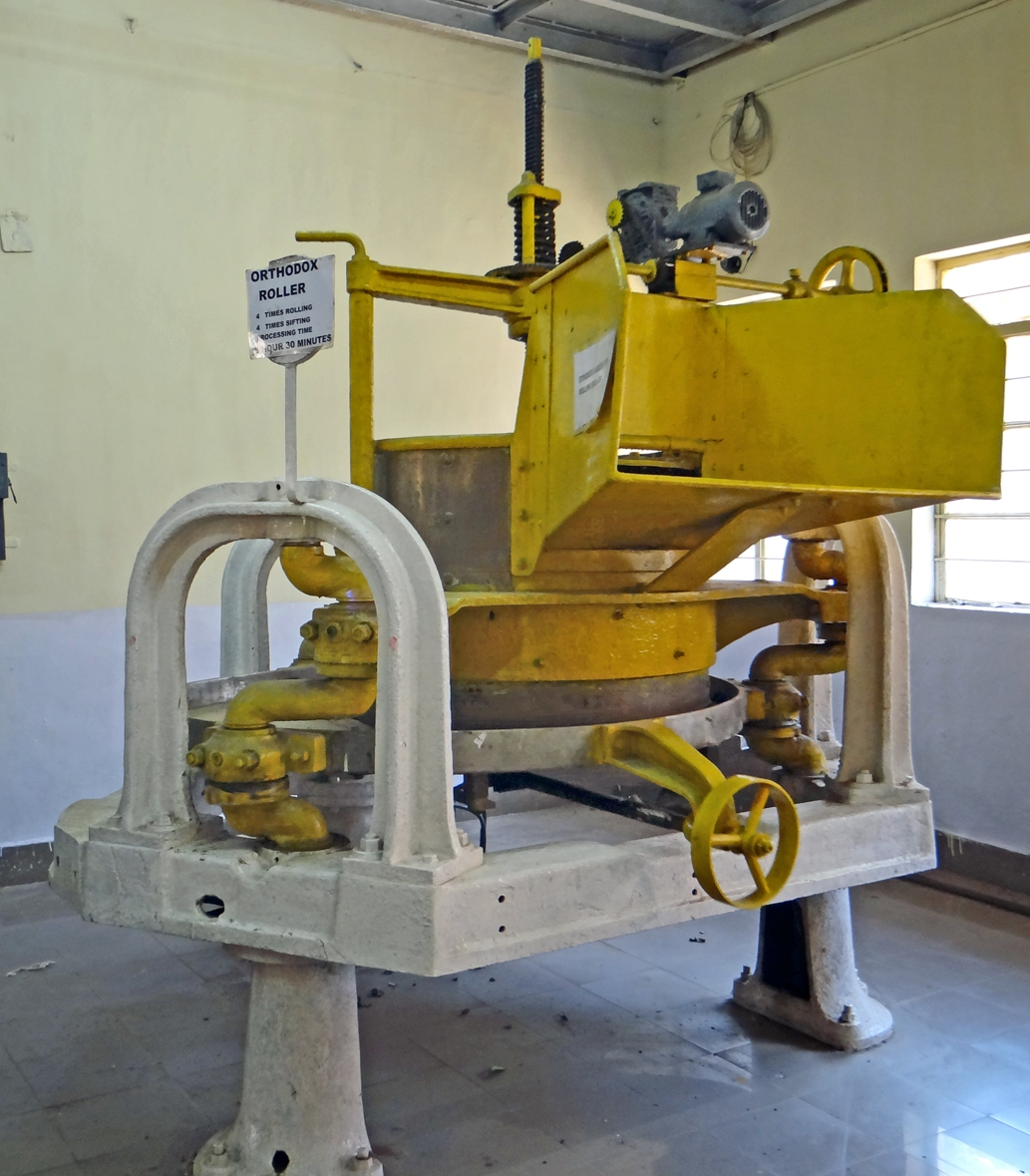
Tea leaf rolling machine, Munnar Tea Museum in Kerala

== History ==
The first CTC machine was brought into service in 1930 at the Amgoorie Tea Garden in Assam under the supervision of Sir William McKercher. It proliferated over three decades starting in 1950, most rapidly in India and Africa.

== Production ==
Today, most black teas produced use the CTC method or the closely related Rotorvane orthodox manufacture. CTC and Rotorvane orthodox have a finished product that is well suited for tea bags, as the product quickly gives a dark brew.

For many large tea producers, 80% to 90% of the factory's production is of small, broken, primary grades suitable for tea bag blends; the remaining 10% to 20% are secondary grades which trade at a discount to the primary grades. The convenience, low price, strong liquor, generic flavor, and mild bitterness all have contributed to the near-monopoly that CTC-type teas now enjoy in South Asia.

In the Indian domestic market, this type of manufacture is by far the most popular – over 80% of tea production is of the CTC type. Also in the export market, particularly in the CIS, the Middle East, and in the United Kingdom and Ireland, CTC teas continue to be the ones most highly in demand.

CTC teas generally produce a rich red-brown colour when they are boiled by the Indian method. The drawback of the CTC method is that it tends by its nature, and unfortunately by adulteration, to homogenize all black tea flavors. In the process of crushing, tearing and pelletising the tea leaves, pressures and stresses occur which break down the cells, releasing large amounts of the phytins that normally oxidise to produce black tea's mahogany colour. Since, regardless of origin, CTC teas in their dry form are generically "tea-like" in aroma, and of almost identical, pelletized appearance, it is easy to adulterate a more expensive CTC-type tea with inexpensive and generally mild lowland teas of the same process. Different types of orthodox-processed whole and broken leaf teas, by contrast, look quite different from each other, making them more difficult to adulterate.

== See also ==
- Assam tea
- Nilgiri tea
