= Dooars =

Alluvial floodplains in eastern-northeastern India

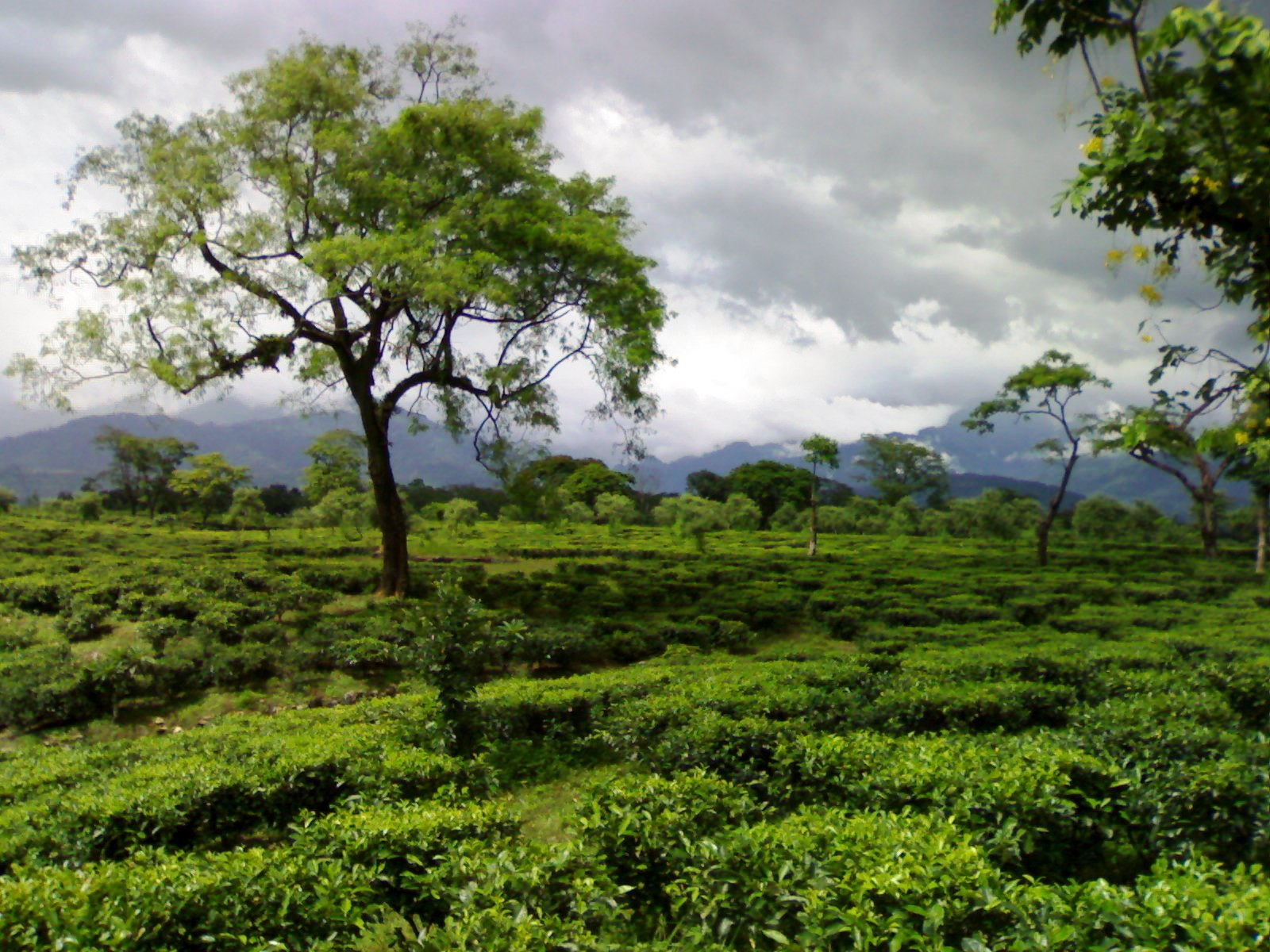
- A tea garden in the Dooars with the Himalayas in the background

Ecology
- Realm: Indomalayan realm

Geography
- Country: India; Bhutan
- Elevation: 90–1,750 m (300–5,740 ft)
- Rivers: Brahmaputra River, Murti river

Conservation
- Global 200: Terai-Duar savanna and grasslands

The Dooars or Duars (/duˈɑːrz/) are the alluvial floodplains in eastern-northeastern India and southern Bhutan that lie south of the outer foothills of the Himalayas and north of the Brahmaputra River basin. This region is about 30 km (19 mi) wide and stretches over about 350 km (220 mi) from the Teesta River in West Bengal to the Dhansiri River in Udalguri district of Assam. The region forms the gateway to Bhutan. It is part of the Terai-Duar savanna and grasslands ecoregion.

Dooars means 'doors' in Assamese, Bengali, Bhojpuri, Kamtapuri, Magahi and Maithili languages. There are 18 passages or gateways between the hills in Bhutan and the plains in India. This region is divided by the Sankosh River into Eastern and Western Dooars, consisting of an area of 880 km^{2} (340 sq mi).

== History ==
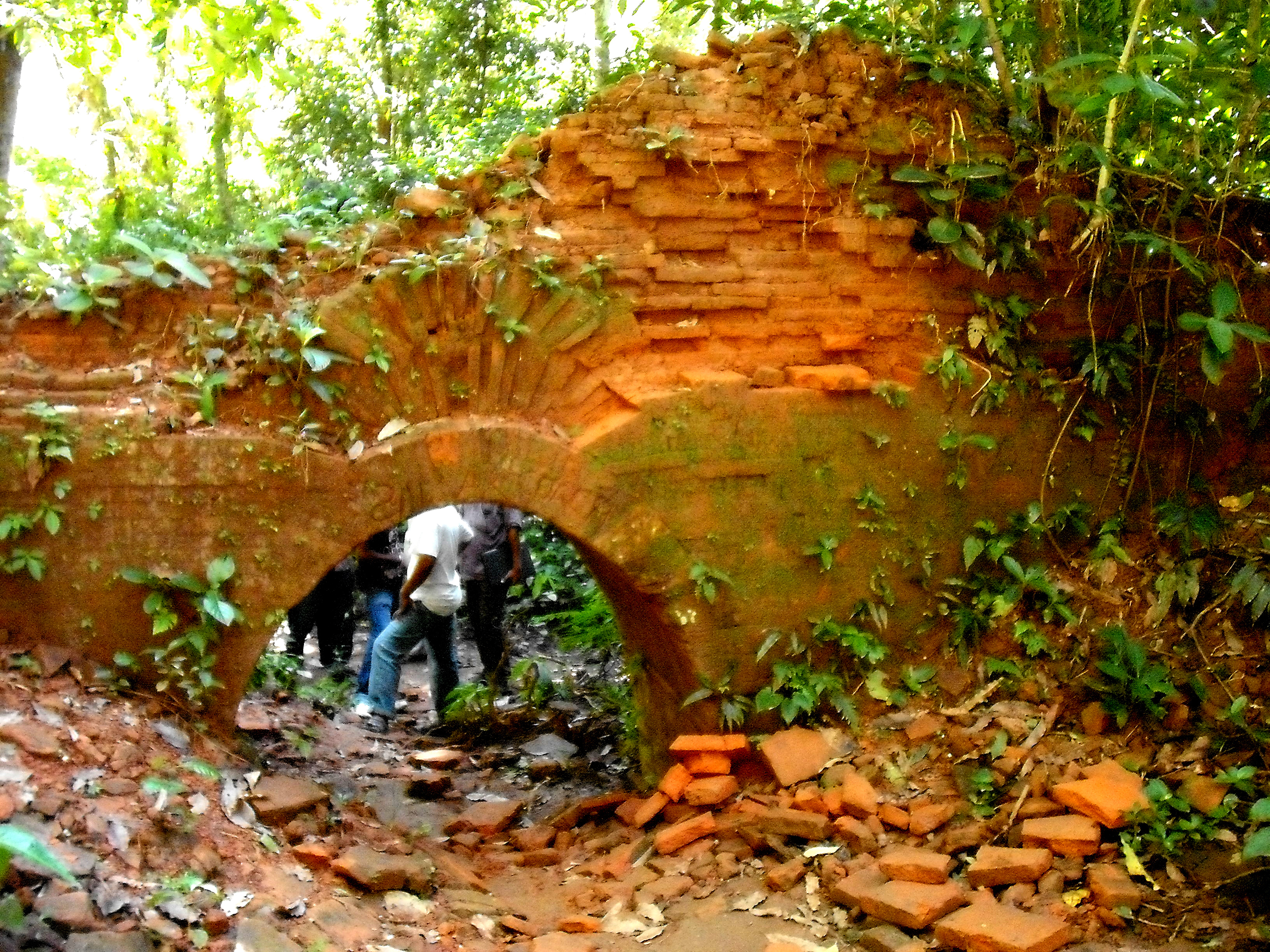
Remains of Nalrajar Garh in Chilapata Forests in Western Dooars

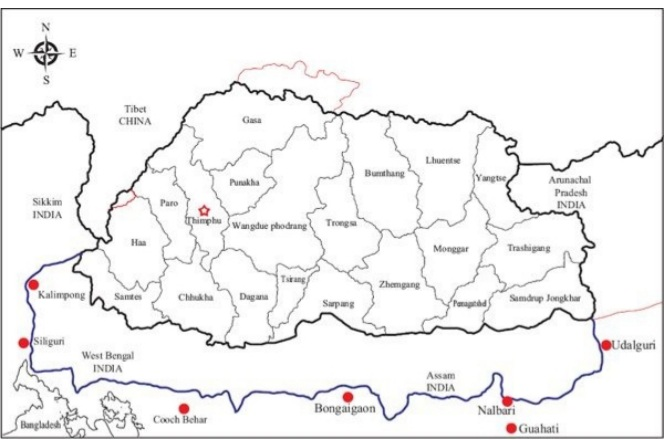
Most of the Duars were under the Kingdom of Bhutan till the Duar War of 1865

The Dooars belonged to the Kamata Kingdom under the Koch dynasty; They acted as a trade route between Assam and Bhutan. Assam exports wäre muga, silk cloth, endi cloth, dried fish and rice and imports consisted of woollen cloth, gold-dust, rock salt, yaktails musk, ponies and blankets from Bhutan.

In the early 17th century, the combined forces of Ahoms and Koches temporarily checked the Bhutia's transgression. During this period two important Duars on the Darrang frontier, Buriguma and Killing were under Ahoms control. During the Ahom–Mughal conflicts in the mid-17th century, the Bhutias attempted to extend their authority as far as Gohain Kamal Ali road.

In the reign of Ahom king Jayadhwaj Singha, the Druk Desi of Bhutan requested the transfer of these Duars to Bhutan. Therefore, an agreement was drawn, and the Darrang Duars went to the hands of Bhutias on the condition of annual tribute to the Ahoms. The Darrang Duars were also surrendered to Ahoms annually for four months from June to October. These Duars were properties of Ahom government, but the Druk Desi of Bhutan took possession of them in last phase of 18th century when the Ahoms were engaged in internal rebellions.

This region was controlled by the kingdom of Bhutan when British India annexed it in 1865 after the Duar War under the command of Captain Hedayat Ali. Bhutan lost almost one-fifth of its area in this war.

The area was divided into two parts: Western Dooars and Eastern Dooars. The Western Dooars were under the Kingdom of Cooch Behar State from 1586 to 1949, and the Eastern Dooars under the Kingdom of Koch Hajo. Under the Koch government, the officer-in-charge of the Duars were called Subahdar. Similar office existed under the Bhutan government, the Subah was selected by the provincial governors called Ponlops. The Ahom government managed the Duars through Duarieas. The other two Dooars were the Kamrup Duars and Darrang Duars. The Eastern Dooars was merged with Goalpara district in Assam, the Kamrup Dooars was merged with Kamrup district, the Darrang Dooars was merged with Darrang District and the western part was turned into a new district named Western Dooars. Again in the year 1869, the name was changed to Jalpaiguri district.

=== Western Dooars ===
The Western Dooars are part of the Duars of northern part of West Bengal, India or those located to the west of Goalpara district of Assam. The Western Dooars came under the British in 1865.The region comes under the Kalimpong district, Jalpaiguri district, Alipurduar district and some parts of Cooch Behar district. The Western Dooars were created in 1865. It was merged with the Jalpaiguri district in 1869.

=== Eastern Dooars ===
The Eastern Dooars are part of the Dooars of Lower Assam. Dooars between Sankosh River and Manas River are called Eastern Dooars. The five Dooars under Eastern Dooars includes Bijni, Sidli, Chirang, Ripu and Guma. The area came under the rule of the British in 1865. The region today falls under the Bongaigaon district and Kokrajhar, Chirang districts of Bodoland Territorial Region in Assam.

=== Kamrup Dooars ===
The Kamrup Dooars are part of the Dooars of Lower Assam. Dooars between Manas River and Bornadi River are called Kamrup Dooars. The five Dooars under Kamrup Dooars include Bijni, Chapakhamar, Chapaguri, Banska and Gurkola. Under the Bhutan government, the Kamrup Duars was under a Penlop or Provincial Governor under whom was the Jongpen or Subah. Kamrup Dooars were annexed by the British East India Company in 1841. Today, the area falls under the Nalbari district, Kamrup district and Baksa district of Bodoland Territorial Region.

=== Darrang Dooars ===
The Darrang Dooars are part of the Dooars of Lower Assam. Dooars between Bornadi River and Dhansiri River are called Darrang Dooars. The three Dooars under Darrang Dooars include Killing, Buriguma and Koriapar. The Koriapar Dooar was held by the chiefs of the Monpa people who were subordinate to the ruler of Tawang, who in turn were a tributary to the Tibetan government at Lhasa. The Killing, Buriguma were annexed by the East India Company in 1841 and Koriapar Dooars in 1844. The region today falls under the Udalguri and Sonitpur districts of Assam.

== Geography and climate ==
The Dooars region politically constitutes the northern bank of the Brahmaputra Valley in state of Assam and the plains of Kalimpong district, the whole of Jalpaiguri district and Alipurduar district and the upper region of Cooch Behar district in West Bengal.

The Dooars is dotted with many towns and cities. The largest cities in the region stretching from the Darjeeling foothills to the Arunachal Pradesh foothills are Siliguri and Jalpaiguri, which both partly lie in the Terai region rather the Dooars, geographically. This northern Bengal cities are well connected with the rest of country by road, air and railway and is the business hub of the region.

The other cities are Kokrajhar, Bongaigaon, Goalpara, Barpeta and Dhubri in Assam. Cooch Behar, Alipurduar, Dhupguri, Malbazar, Mainaguri, Falakata and Birpara are the major cities of the Dooars in West Bengal, and Kishanganj in Bihar.

A number of endangered animals live in the forests of the Dooars like Bengal tiger, Indian rhinoceros, Indian elephant,

Climate data for Siliguri (Bagdogra Airport), 1991–2020 normals, extremes 1951–present
| Month | Jan | Feb | Mar | Apr | May | Jun | Jul | Aug | Sep | Oct | Nov | Dec | Year |
|---|---|---|---|---|---|---|---|---|---|---|---|---|---|
| Record high °C (°F) | 32.5 (90.5) | 33.2 (91.8) | 38.1 (100.6) | 41.7 (107.1) | 40.8 (105.4) | 41.9 (107.4) | 40.4 (104.7) | 40.0 (104.0) | 40.1 (104.2) | 36.6 (97.9) | 33.8 (92.8) | 32.6 (90.7) | 41.9 (107.4) |
| Mean maximum °C (°F) | 25.6 (78.1) | 27.9 (82.2) | 32.8 (91.0) | 34.9 (94.8) | 35.3 (95.5) | 36.3 (97.3) | 36.0 (96.8) | 36.7 (98.1) | 35.8 (96.4) | 33.5 (92.3) | 30.4 (86.7) | 27.2 (81.0) | 37.0 (98.6) |
| Mean daily maximum °C (°F) | 22.0 (71.6) | 24.5 (76.1) | 29.3 (84.7) | 30.8 (87.4) | 29.9 (85.8) | 29.5 (85.1) | 29.1 (84.4) | 29.6 (85.3) | 29.2 (84.6) | 28.5 (83.3) | 26.3 (79.3) | 23.4 (74.1) | 27.7 (81.8) |
| Mean daily minimum °C (°F) | 10.7 (51.3) | 12.8 (55.0) | 16.1 (61.0) | 19.5 (67.1) | 22.1 (71.8) | 24.0 (75.2) | 24.6 (76.3) | 24.6 (76.3) | 23.5 (74.3) | 19.7 (67.5) | 15.2 (59.4) | 11.8 (53.2) | 18.7 (65.7) |
| Mean minimum °C (°F) | 6.9 (44.4) | 7.2 (45.0) | 12.5 (54.5) | 16.5 (61.7) | 18.6 (65.5) | 22.0 (71.6) | 23.4 (74.1) | 23.6 (74.5) | 21.9 (71.4) | 16.8 (62.2) | 11.9 (53.4) | 7.7 (45.9) | 6.5 (43.7) |
| Record low °C (°F) | 1.9 (35.4) | 3.5 (38.3) | 6.2 (43.2) | 9.6 (49.3) | 15.0 (59.0) | 20.0 (68.0) | 21.0 (69.8) | 18.4 (65.1) | 19.8 (67.6) | 12.3 (54.1) | 6.4 (43.5) | 2.4 (36.3) | 1.9 (35.4) |
| Average precipitation mm (inches) | 23 (0.9) | 24 (0.9) | 34 (1.3) | 76 (3.0) | 249 (9.8) | 628 (24.7) | 843 (33.2) | 589 (23.2) | 403 (15.9) | 121 (4.8) | 10 (0.4) | 11 (0.4) | 3,011 (118.5) |
| Average rainy days | 4 | 4 | 5 | 11 | 17 | 20 | 21 | 20 | 18 | 8 | 2 | 2 | 132 |
| Average relative humidity (%) | 69 | 65 | 54 | 63 | 79 | 88 | 90 | 88 | 87 | 80 | 70 | 68 | 75 |
| Average ultraviolet index | 5 | 7 | 9 | 11 | 12 | 13 | 14 | 13 | 11 | 8 | 5 | 4 | 9 |
Source 1: normal temperaturesUltraviolet Index
Source 2: Extremes(India Meteorological Department), Mean maximum and Mean minimum temperatures

== Media ==
The film "The Dooars World", narrated by Dia Mirza, shows the wildlife and human-animal relationship in the Dooars.
