= Alipurduars Lok Sabha constituency =

Lok Sabha Constituency in West Bengal

Coordinates: 26°30′N 89°31′E

Alipurduars WB-2
- Lok Sabha constituency
- Interactive Map Outlining Alipurduars Lok Sabha Constituency

Constituency details
- Country: India
- Region: East India
- State: West Bengal
- Assembly constituencies: Tufanganj; Kumargram; Kalchini; Alipurduars; Falakata; Madarihat; Nagrakata
- Established: 1977
- Total electors: 17,73,252 (2024)
- Reservation: ST

Member of Parliament
- 18th Lok Sabha
- Incumbent Manoj Tigga
- Party: BJP
- Alliance: NDA
- Elected year: 2024

Alipurduars Lok Sabha constituency is one of the 543 parliamentary constituencies in India. The constituency centres on Alipurduar in West Bengal. While five assembly segments of No. 2 Alipurduars Lok Sabha constituency are in Alipurduar district, one segment is in Cooch Behar district and one segment is in Jalpaiguri district. The seat is reserved for scheduled tribes.

== Assembly segments ==
Parliamentary constituencies in West Bengal - 1. Cooch Behar, 2. Alipurduars, 3. Jalpaiguri, 4. Darjeeling, 5. Raiganj, 6. Balurghat, 7. Maldaha Uttar, 8. Maldaha Dakshin, 9. Jangipur, 10. Baharampur, 11. Murshidabad, 12. Krishnanagar, 13. Ranaghat, 14. Bangaon, 15. Barrackpore, 16. Dum Dum, 17. Barasat, 18. Basirhat, 19. Jaynagar, 20. Mathurapur, 21. Diamond Harbour, 22. Jadavpur, 23. Kolkata Dakshin, 24. Kolkata Uttar, 25. Howrah, 26. Uluberia, 27. Serampore, 28. Hooghly, 29. Arambagh, 30. Tamluk, 31, Kanthi, 32. Ghatal, 33. Jhargram, 34. Medinipur, 35. Purulia, 36. Bankura, 37. Bishnupur, 38. Bardhaman Purba, 39. Bardhaman Durgapur, 40. Asansol, 41. Bolpur, 42. Birbhum

As per order of the Delimitation Commission in respect of the delimitation of constituencies in the West Bengal, parliamentary constituency no. 2 Alipurduars, reserved for Scheduled tribes (ST), is composed of the following assembly segments from 2009:

#	Name	District	MLA, from 2026	MLA's Party	2024 LS Lead
9	Tufanganj	Cooch Behar	Malati Rava Roy	BJP	BJP
10	Kumargram (ST)	Alipurduar	Manoj Kumar Oraon	BJP	BJP
11	Kalchini (ST)	Alipurduar	Bishal Lama	BJP	BJP
12	Alipurduars	Alipurduar	Paritosh Das	BJP	BJP
13	Falakata (SC)	Alipurduar	Dipak Barman	BJP	BJP
14	Madarihat (ST)	Alipurduar	Laxuman Limbu	BJP	BJP
21	Nagrakata (ST)	Jalpaiguri	Puna Bhengra	BJP	AITC

== Members of Parliament ==
Year	Name	Party
Till 1977 : Constituency did not exist
1977	Pius Tirkey	Revolutionary Socialist Party
1980	Pius Tirkey	Revolutionary Socialist Party
1984	Pius Tirkey	Revolutionary Socialist Party
1989	Pius Tirkey	Revolutionary Socialist Party
1991	Pius Tirkey	Revolutionary Socialist Party
1996	Joachim Baxla	Revolutionary Socialist Party
1998	Joachim Baxla	Revolutionary Socialist Party
1999	Joachim Baxla	Revolutionary Socialist Party
2004	Joachim Baxla	Revolutionary Socialist Party
2009	Manohar Tirkey	Revolutionary Socialist Party
2014	Dasrath Tirkey	Trinamool Congress
2019	John Barla	Bharatiya Janata Party
2024	Manoj Tigga	Bharatiya Janata Party

== General election results ==
Vote share of Winning candidates
2024	48.92%
2019	54.40%
2014	29.46%
2009	41.22%
2004	45.70%
1999	51.25%
1998	51.47%
1996	53.11%
1991	52.82%
1989	54.93%
1984	51.91%
1980	60.00%
1977	56.87%

=== 2024 ===
2024 Indian general elections: Alipurduar
Party	Candidate	Votes	%	±%
BJP	Manoj Tigga	695,314	48.92	▼5.48
AITC	Prakash Chik Baraik	6,19,867	43.61	▲6.89
RSP	Mili Oraon	39,709	2.79	▼0.12
Independent	Parimal Oraon	12,584	0.89	New
Independent	Arjun Indwar	11,122	0.78	New
NOTA	None of the above	21,298	1.5	▼0.03
Majority		75,447	5.3	
Turnout		14,21,389	79.76	▼4.03
BJP hold		Swing		

=== 2019 ===
2019 Indian general election: Alipurduars
Party	Candidate	Votes	%	±%
BJP	John Barla	750,804	54.40	+27.10
AITC	Dasrath Tirkey	506,815	36.72	+7.26
RSP	Mili Oraon	54,010	3.91	−23.81
INC	Mohanlal Basumata	27,427	1.99	−7.50
NOTA	None of the above	21,175	1.53	−0.09
Majority		243,989	17.68	
Turnout		1,381,176	83.79	+0.61
Registered electors		1,648,383		
BJP gain from AITC		Swing	+9.92	

=== 2014 ===
2014 Indian general elections: Alipurduars
Party	Candidate	Votes	%	±%
AITC	Dasrath Tirkey	362,453	29.46	+0.32
RSP	Manohar Tirkey	3,41,056	27.72	−13.50
BJP	Birendra Bara Oraon	3,35,857	27.30	+5.90
INC	Joseph Munda	1,16,718	9.49	+9.49
BSP	Eliash Narjinary	11,039	0.90	
Independent	Paul Dexion Khariya	10,450	0.85	
Independent	Kapin Ch. Boro	7,676	0.63	
SUCI(C)	Subash Chik Baraik	7,131	0.58	
Rashtriya Janadhikar Suraksha Party	Ishabela Kujur	5,961	0.49	
Samajwadi Jan Parishad	Bilkan Bara	5,340	0.44	
None of the Above	None of the Above	19,885	1.62	−−−
Majority		21,397	1.74	−10.34
Turnout		13,32,409	83.18	
AITC gain from RSP		Swing	-6.43	

=== 2009 ===
General Election, 2009: Alipurduars
Party	Candidate	Votes	%	±%
RSP	Manohar Tirkey	384,890	41.22	
AITC	Paban Kumar Lakra	272,068	29.14	
BJP	Manoj Tigga	199,843	21.40	
Independent	Joachim Baxla	18,855	2.02	
Independent	Pauldexion Khariya	16,856	1.81	
BSP	Elias Narjinary	14,155	1.52	
SWJP	Bilkan Bara	9,659	1.03	
Independent	Thaddeus Lakra	8,750	0.94	
Independent	Kamal Lama	8,658	0.93	
Turnout		933,734	75.96	
RSP hold		Swing		

=== 2004 ===
2004 Indian general election: Alipurduars
Party	Candidate	Votes	%	±%
RSP	Joachim Baxla	384,252	45.70	
BJP	Manoj Tigga	2,39,128	28.44	
INC	Ratan Lal Baraik	1,69,499	20.16	
Independent	Samarendra Ekka (Pintu)	20,014	2.38	
Independent	Rampratap Baraik	14,087	1.68	
Independent	Paul Dexion Kharia	13,856	1.65	
Majority		1,45,124	17.26	
Turnout				
RSP hold		Swing		

=== 1999 ===
1999 Indian general election: Alipurduars
Party	Candidate	Votes	%	±%
RSP	Joachim Baxla	389,919	51.25	
BJP	Dhirendra Narjinarai	2,36,786	31.12	
INC	Basanti Baraik	1,19,309	15.68	
Independent	Rabindra Kumar Brahma	7,403	0.97	
Independent	Ram Pratap Baraik	5,199	0.68	
NCP	Kolha Baraik	2,246	0.30	
Majority		1,53,133	20.13	
Turnout		7,77,585	74.81	
RSP hold		Swing		

=== 1998 ===
1998 Indian general election: Alipurduars
Party	Candidate	Votes	%	±%
RSP	Joachim Baxla	415,006	51.47	
BJP	Dhirendra Narjinarai	2,19,407	27.21	
INC	Bulu Ram Prodhan	1,62,168	20.11	
SJJP	Fabianus Tirkey	6,699	0.83	
Independent	Samarendra Ekka (Pintu)	2,967	0.37	
Majority		1,95,599	24.26	
Turnout		8,27,362	80.83	
RSP hold		Swing		

=== 1996 ===
1996 Indian general election: Alipurduars
Party	Candidate	Votes	%	±%
RSP	Joachim Baxla	437,371	53.11	
INC	Pius Tirkey	2,99,561	36.37	
BJP	Indra Mohan Rava	65,493	7.95	
Independent	Phaguram Barhaikchik	16,060	1.95	
Independent	Saul Lakra	4,505	0.55	
Independent	Amiya Ranjan Barua	573	0.07	
Majority		1,37,810	16.74	
Turnout		8,54,456	85.37	
RSP hold		Swing		

=== 1991 ===
1991 Indian general election: Alipurduars
Party	Candidate	Votes	%	±%
RSP	Pius Tirkey	365,370	52.82	
INC	Philip Minj	2,35,258	34.01	
BJP	Indra Mohan Rava	79,994	11.56	
BSP	Laiso Oraon	5,606	0.81	
Independent	Ram Pratap Baraik	5,553	0.80	
Majority		1,30,112	18.81	
Turnout		7,11,036	77.39	
RSP hold		Swing		

=== 1989 ===
1989 Indian general election: Alipurduars
Party	Candidate	Votes	%	±%
RSP	Pius Tirkey	384,119	54.93	
INC	Denis Lakra	2,98,476	42.68	
Independent	Basumata Ajoy Kumar	8,765	1.25	
AMB	Francis Lakra	5,488	0.78	
BSP	Laiso Uraon	2,473	0.35	
Majority		85,643	12.25	
Turnout		7,18,825	79.31	
RSP hold		Swing		

=== 1984 ===
1984 Indian general election: Alipurduars
Party	Candidate	Votes	%	±%
RSP	Pijus Tirkey	278,358	51.91	
INC	Philip Minj	2,48,176	46.29	
Independent	Lalman Lama	7,716	1.44	
Independent	Sanjoy Kumar Oraon	1,931	0.36	
Majority		30,182	5.62	
Turnout		5,57,382	75.65	
RSP hold		Swing		

=== 1980 ===
1980 Indian general election: Alipurduars
Party	Candidate	Votes	%	±%
RSP	Pius Tirkey	243,485	60.00	
INC(I)	Tuna Oraon	1,28,028	31.55	
INC(U)	Denis Lakra	29,990	7.39	
Independent	Gopal Oraon	4,308	1.06	
Majority		1,15,457	28.45	
Turnout		4,24,426	64.23	
RSP hold		Swing		

=== 1977 ===
1977 Indian general election: Alipurduars
Party	Candidate	Votes	%	±%
RSP	Pius Tirkey	167,865	56.87	
INC	Tuna Oraon	1,27,297	43.13	
Majority		40,568	13.74	
Turnout		3,12,975	59.81	
RSP win (new seat)				

== See also ==
- Alipurduar
- List of constituencies of the Lok Sabha
