= Alipurduars =

Alipurduars may refer to:

- Alipurduars (Lok Sabha constituency)
- Alipurduars (Vidhan Sabha constituency)
