= Jogesh =

Jogesh is a given name. Notable people with the name include:

- Jogesh Chandra Bagal (1903–1972), Indian journalist, historian and writer
- Jogesh Chandra Barman (died 2019), Indian politician
- Jogesh Chandra Chatterjee (1895–1960), Indian freedom fighter, revolutionary and parliamentarian
- Jogesh Das (1927–1999), Indian short-story writer and novelist
- Jogesh Dutta (born 1935), Indian mime who pioneered the art of mime in India
- Jogesh Chandra Ghosh (1887–1971), scholar, Ayurveda practitioner, entrepreneur and philanthropist
- Jogesh Pati (born 1937), Indian-American theoretical physicist
- Jogesh Kumar Singh, Indian politician

== See also ==
- Jogesh Chandra Chaudhuri College, established in 1965, undergraduate college in Kolkata, India
- Jogesh Chandra Chaudhuri Law College, Government Sponsored Law College in south Kolkata, India
