= Manoj Kumar Oraon =

Indian politician

Cabinet Minister for Forest Affairs & Environment
- Incumbent
- Assumed office 1 June 2026
- Governor: R. N. Ravi
- Deputy: Dibakar Gharami
- Chief Minister: Suvendu Adhikari

Member of the West Bengal Legislative Assembly
- In office 2014 – 2016 , 2021 -
- Preceded by: James Kujur
- Constituency: Kumargram

Personal details
- Party: Bharatiya Janata Party (2017-present)
- Other political affiliations: Revolutionary Socialist Party (till 2017)
- Parent: Jit Bahan Oraon (father)
- Education: North Bengal University
- Profession: Politician

Manoj Kumar Oraon is an Indian politician affiliated with the Bharatiya Janata Party (BJP). He has been active in politics in the Kumargram region of West Bengal, participating in various social and political movements.

== Early life and education ==
Oraon was born in Kumargram, in the Alipurduar district of West Bengal. His father's name is Jit Bahan Oraon. He completed a Bachelor of Education from Eastern Dooars B.Ed Training College in 2011. He has been serving as an assistant teacher at Tufanganj Vivekananda Vidyalaya (H.S.) since 2011.

== Political career ==
Oraon began his political career with the Revolutionary Socialist Party (RSP). He was elected as a Member of the Legislative Assembly (MLA) from the Kumargram constituency in a 2014 by-election. In the 2016 West Bengal Legislative Assembly election, he contested from the same constituency but lost to James Kujur.

In 2017, Oraon joined the Bharatiya Janata Party (BJP). In the 2021 West Bengal Legislative Assembly election, he was elected from the Kumargram constituency, defeating his nearest rival, Leos Kujur of the Trinamool Congress (TMC).

On 1 June 2026, he was sworn in as a Cabinet Minister of West Bengal, along with twelve other members.

== Electoral history ==
- 2014 – Elected as Member of the Legislative Assembly (MLA) from Kumargram constituency in a by-election as a candidate of the Revolutionary Socialist Party (RSP).
- 2016 – Contested from Kumargram in the West Bengal Legislative Assembly election; lost to James Kujur.
- 2021 – Elected as MLA from Kumargram as a candidate of the Bharatiya Janata Party (BJP), defeating Leos Kujur of the Trinamool Congress (TMC).
- 2026 – Contesting from Kumargram constituency as a Bharatiya Janata Party (BJP) candidate.

== Controversies ==
=== Resignation from party posts amid internal rift ===
In April 2025, Manoj Kumar Oraon resigned from all organisational posts within the Bharatiya Janata Party (BJP), citing dissatisfaction with the functioning of certain party leaders in Alipurduar district. He alleged that some leaders were prioritising personal interests over the party and ignoring grassroots workers.

Despite stepping down from party posts, Oraon stated that he would continue to remain associated with the BJP as a primary member. The development was seen as a sign of internal discord within the party in the region.

=== Suspension from Assembly over education scam protest ===
In June 2025, Manoj Kumar Oraon was suspended from the West Bengal Legislative Assembly for one day by Speaker Biman Banerjee amid uproar over alleged corruption in the education sector. The incident occurred after Bharatiya Janata Party (BJP) legislators protested and demanded discussion on issues related to teacher recruitment and job losses, leading to disruption of Assembly proceedings.

=== Alleged attack during flood relief distribution ===
In October 2025, Manoj Kumar Oraon was allegedly attacked while distributing flood relief materials in his constituency in North Bengal. He sustained injuries in the incident and was taken to a hospital for treatment. The Bharatiya Janata Party alleged that the attack was carried out by supporters of the Trinamool Congress, while the Trinamool Congress denied the allegations, calling them baseless.
