= Wilson Champramary =

Indian politician

Member of the West Bengal Legislative Assembly
- In office 23 August 2009 – 2 May 2021
- Preceded by: Manohar Tirkey
- Succeeded by: Bishal Lama
- Constituency: Kalchini

Personal details
- Party: Bharatiya Janata Party (2019-2026)
- Other political affiliations: All India Trinamool Congress (2016-2019) (2026-Present)
- Occupation: Politician

Wilson Champramary is an Indian politician from the state of West Bengal. He is a two term member of the West Bengal Legislative Assembly representing the Kalchini.

== Career ==
He belongs to the Mech community. He represented the Kalchini constituency. He won the Assembly Election 2016 as a member of All India Trinamool Congress in which he defeated his nearest rival Bishal Lama of BJP.

In 2009, he won a by election after the preceding MLA Manohar Tirkey won the Lok Sabha election from Alipurudars as an independent supported by the Gorkha Janmukti Morcha. In 2016 he joined All India Trinamool Congress, but later switched to BJP after the 2019 Lok Sabha elections.

State Legislative Assembly
Preceded by Manohar Tirkey (Revolutionary Socialist Party)	Member of the West Bengal Legislative Assembly from Kalchini Assembly constituency 2011 –	Incumbent
