= Anil Adhikari =

Anil Adhikari may refer to:

- Anil Adhikari, better known by his stage name Yama Buddha (1987–2017), Nepalese rapper
- Anil Adhikari (politician) (c.1949–2019), Indian politician
