= Pijush Kanti Mukherjee =

Pijush Kanti Mukherjee was an Indian politician and trade unionist. He won a seat in the West Bengal Legislative Assembly in the first six consecutive elections held after Independence. He was the Deputy Speaker of the West Bengal Legislative Assembly in 1971.

== Legislator and trade unionist ==
Around time of merger of the Cooch Behar State with the Dominion of India, Mukherjee was a leading figure in Alipurduar in the movement for a merger of Cooch Behar State into West Bengal. He was elected to the West Bengal Legislative Assembly as an Indian National Congress candidate from the Alipurduars constituency in the 1952, 1957 and 1962 elections. He was a member of the General Council of the Indian National Trade Union Congress (INTUC).

He was elected to the West Bengal Legislative Assembly from the Kumargram constituency in the 1967, 1969 and 1971 elections. When the Indian National Congress underwent a split in 1969, Mukherjee sided with the Requisitionists led by Indira Gandhi. The INC(R) president C. Subramaniam declared the West Bengal Pradesh Congress Committee suspended and set up a three-man committee consisting of K.K. Shukla , Pijush Mukherjee and Abdus Sattar to lead the party in West Bengal.

== Deputy Speaker ==
On May 3, 1971, following the 1971 election, Mukherjee was elected Deputy Speaker of the West Bengal Legislative Assembly. He obtained 142 votes, against 130 votes for Mohammed Elias Razi of the Workers Party of India. Mukherjee remained in the post as Deputy Speaker until June 25, 1971.

== Later years ==
He contested the Alipurduars seat in the 1977 West Bengal Legislative Assembly election, but this time as the Janata Party candidate. He finished in third place with 8,808 votes (15.56%).

Mukherjee died in 1998.

== See also ==
- Pijushkanti Mukherjee Mahavidyalaya, a degree college in Sonapur, Alipurduar district.
