= McWilliam Higher Secondary School =

Coordinates: 26°29′47.17″N 89°31′35.26″E

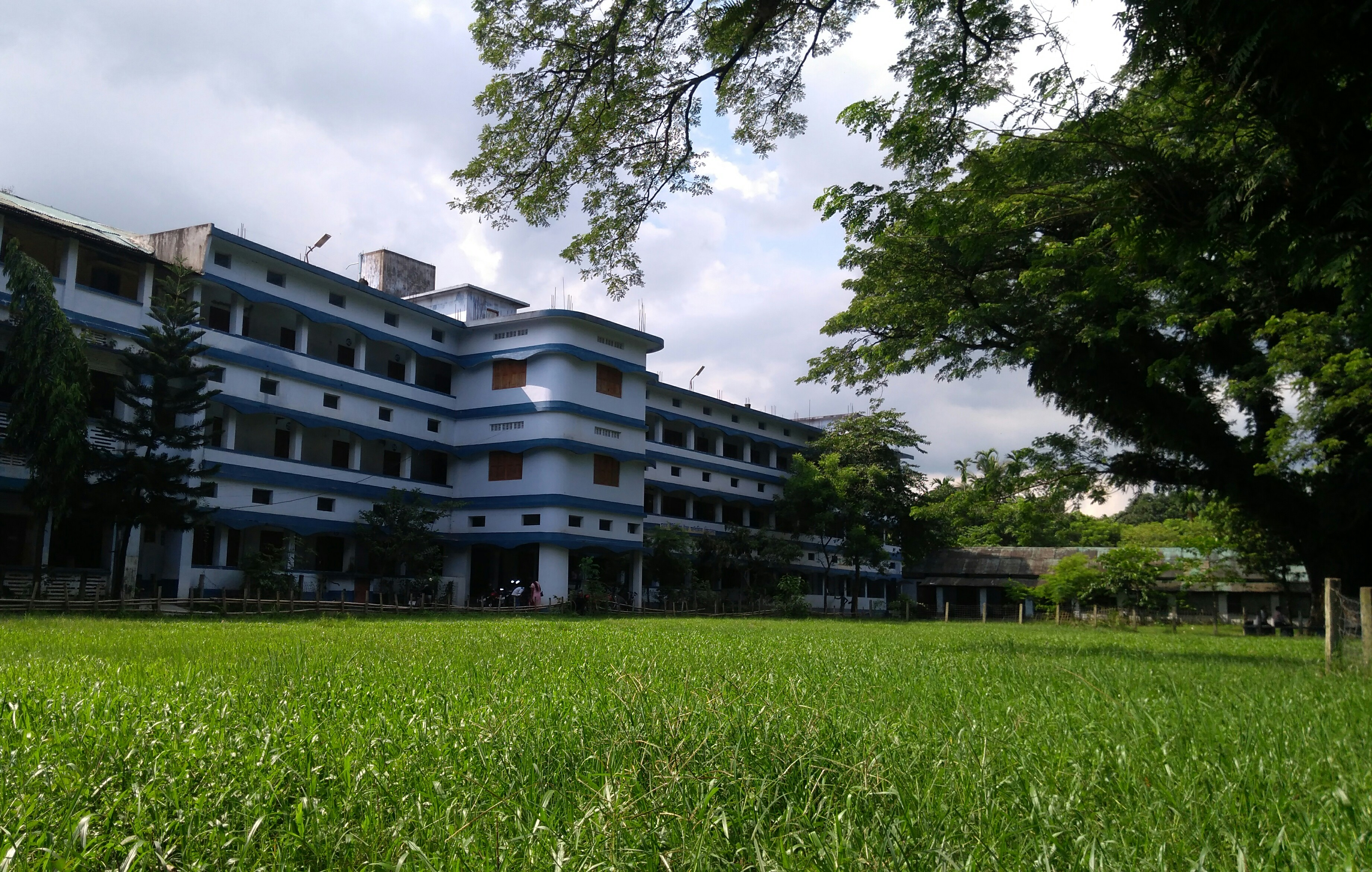
- Alipurduar, India

Information
- Type: State School
- Established: 1937; 89 years ago
- Founder: P.N. McWilliam
- Staff: 78
- Enrolment: 2380
- Language: Bengali and English
- Campus type: Urban
- Colours: White and Blue
- Affiliation: WBBSE; WBCHSE

McWilliam Higher Secondary School is a state government school in Alipurduar, the central town of Dooars, in the Indian state of West Bengal. It is one of the oldest schools in Alipurduar. It was founded in 1937, during British Raj, as an upper primary school. Presently, there are more than two thousand students enrolled in this school from class one to class twelve with seventy eight teachers and a management body consisting students' guardians and teachers. There are two adjacent high school buildings and a primary school building situated in same campus. Also there is another junior school building in other part of the town, near Alipurduar College. This was established in 1955. McWilliam provides a liberal education and the medium of instruction is Bengali and English. This school cater for pupils from the ages of five to eighteen and it is affiliated to West Bengal Board of Secondary Education and West Bengal Council of Higher Secondary Education.

== Peter Neish McWilliam ==
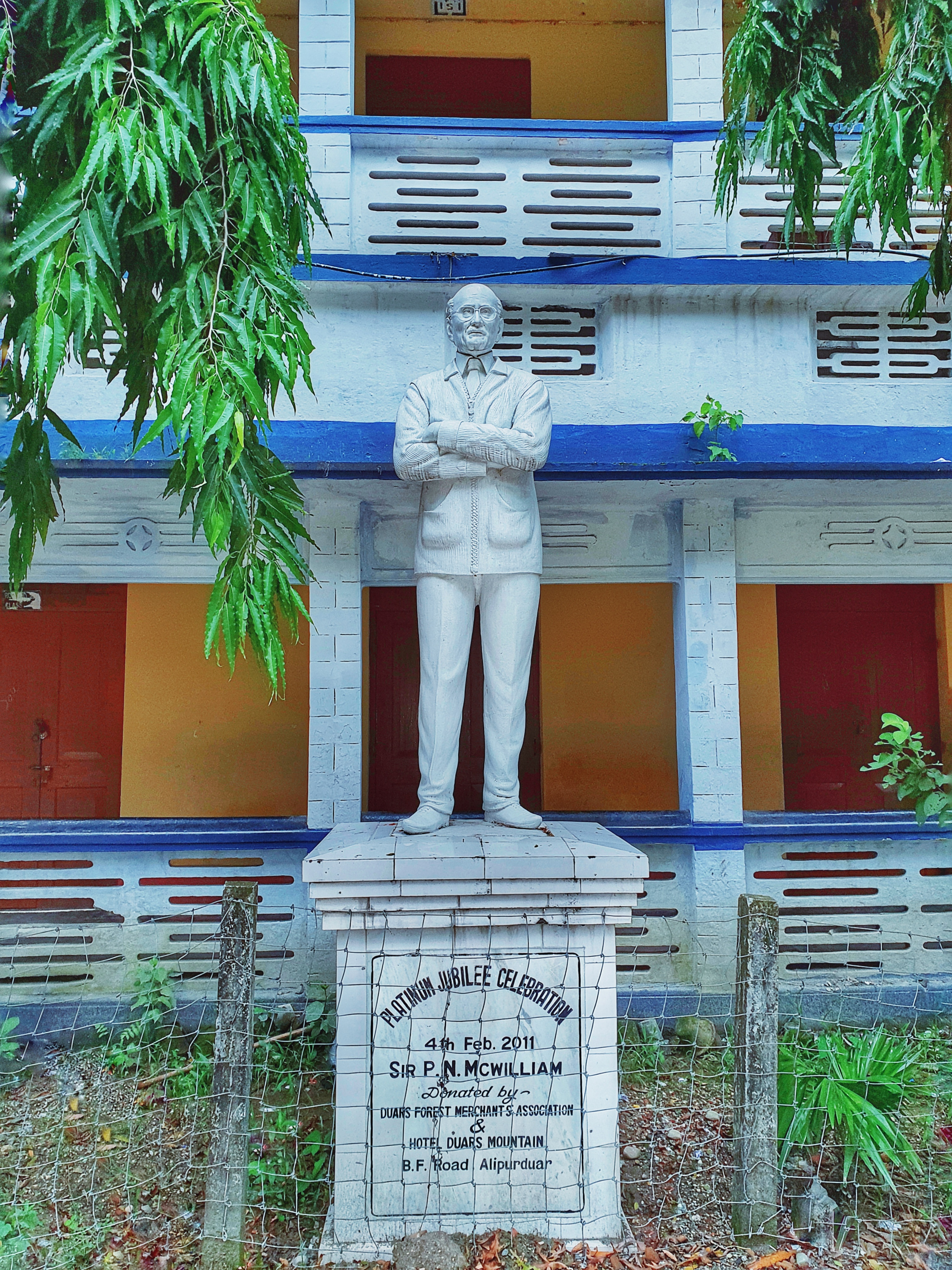
Statue of P.N. McWilliam at McWilliam H.S. School.

McWilliam Upper Primary School was founded by Peter Neish McWilliam (1906–1999), who was an officer in Indian Civil Service and son of Peter McWilliam (a British professional football player and manager). He joined service on 26 November 1930, as Asstt. Magte. and Collr. in Jalpaiguri. After two years serving there and one year in Dacca, he was transferred to Alipurduar as Sub-Divisional Officer.

McWilliam was transferred from Alipurduar, few years after establishing the school. He continued his contribution towards the school and the town through various initiatives of fund arrangements and regular letters to the headmaster. His family created McWilliam Memorial Fund after his death. In 2001 it donated five hundred pounds to the headmaster of the school.

== Early years ==
To build a proper school for children in Alipurduar, McWilliam and his wife began raising money in 1936. After receiving donations from local families and friends, they had enough money to start in 1937 with fifty students between the age of six and ten. Few years later this upper primary school was upgraded to junior high with Muhammad Rahim as its headmaster.

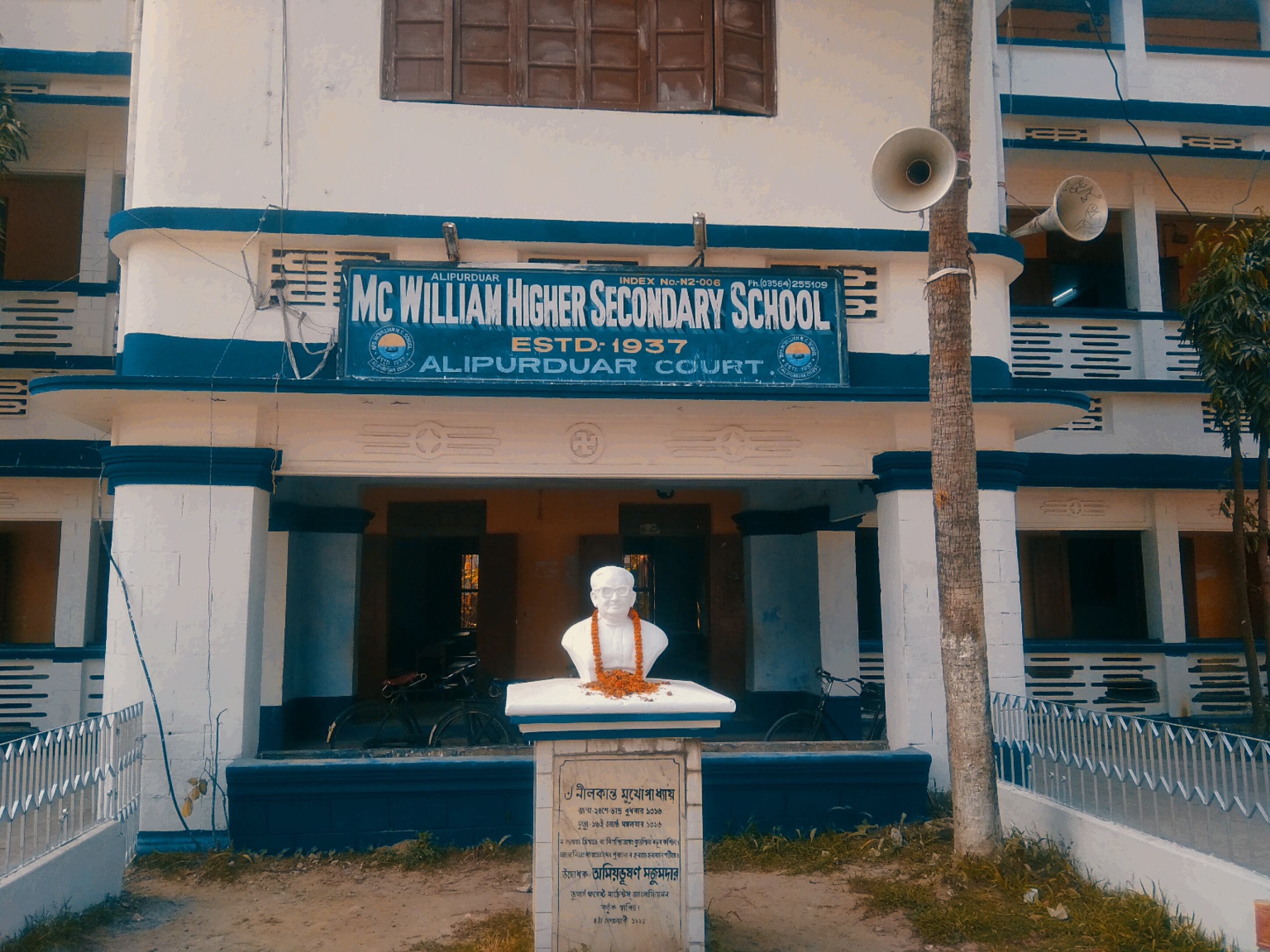
Statue of Nilkanta Mukherjee at school campus.

Nilkanta Mukherjee, an eminent educationist of North Bengal, took initiative to further upgrade this school into McWilliam Higher Secondary School in 1944. He also became headmaster of the school and served till 1969. He donated a major portion of land, owned by McWilliam School, to build Alipurduar College.

In 1993 a devastating flood damaged the school. P.N McWilliam persuaded the Bristol Commonwealth Society to donate funds to the school. In 1998, the society designated the school as its charitable cause for that year.

== Curriculum ==
The academic curriculum includes Mathematics, both the Bengali language and literature, History, Geography, Science, Hindi and Sanskrit (Hindi in class V and VI. Sanskrit in class VII and VIII), English and Physical Education (up to class X).

Class X students are prepared for the Madhyamik Pariksha and WBCHSE higher secondary exam when they are in class XII. The three streams in higher secondary, i.e. class XI and XII, are Humanities, Science and Commerce.

== Badge ==
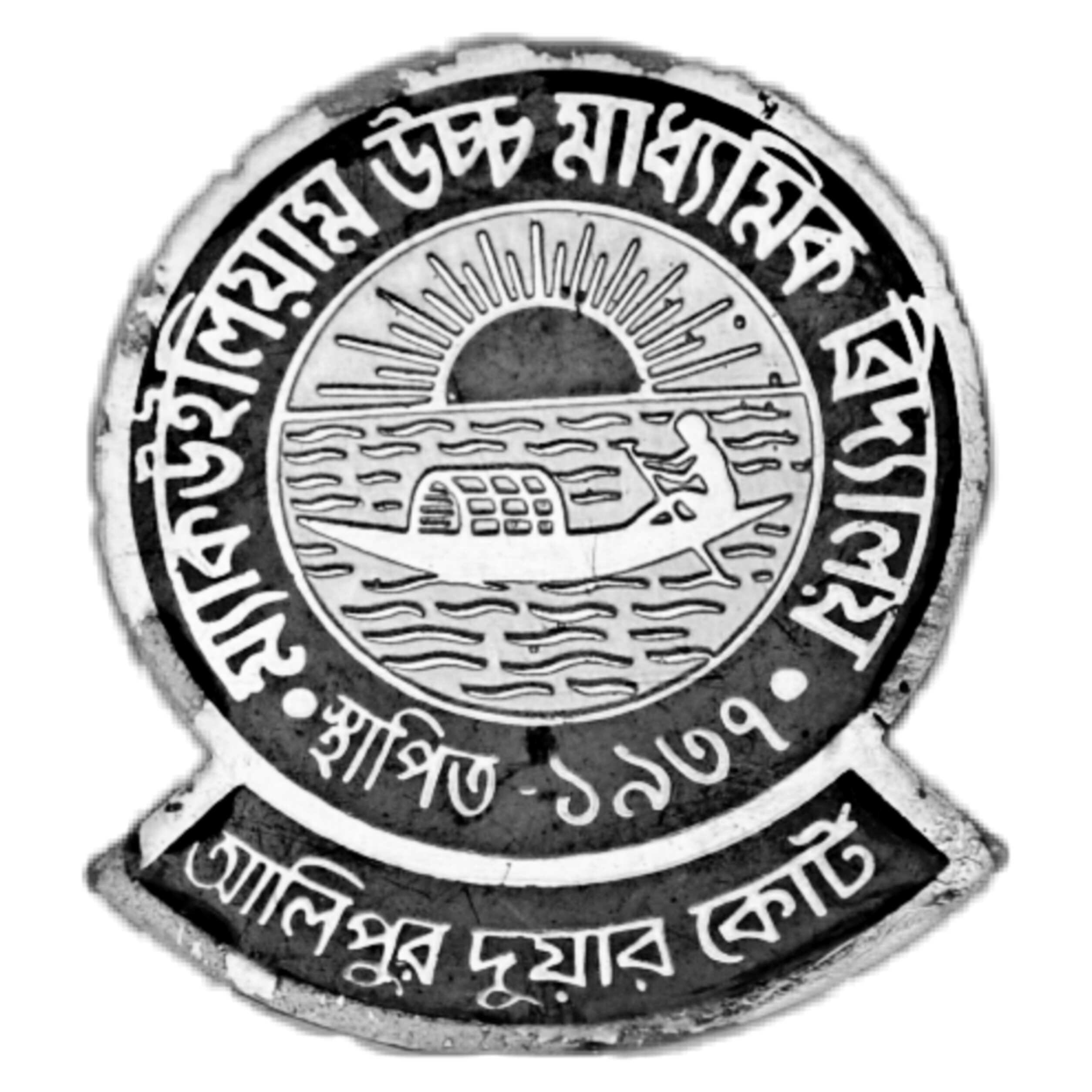
Badge of McWilliam HS School

The badge of McWilliam HS School consists of its name, address and establishment year written on it. The logo pictured as boatman rows his boat on a calm sea and a view of sunrise in the background. The logo symbolizes hope and struggle of a student in the ocean of knowledge that is school.

== Facilities ==
School has an old three storey building renovated and a new four storey building constructed in the year 2010. Two buildings are adjacent and floors connected. There are four conventional labs for Physics, Chemistry, Biology and Geography. A computer lab consisting around twenty basic PCs is also available in the institution. Basic sports amenities are available for students, including 2000 sq meter school ground.

== Extra curricular activities ==
=== Physical training ===
Theres a boys' scout team affiliated to The Bharat Scouts and Guides. These scouts perform every year on republic day celebrations in town. They have won several awards in different occasions.

=== Games and sports ===
Games include athletics, cricket, football, volleyball, badminton. The school sports teams participate in various town and district level tournaments. There are annual sports events every year where school students participate.

== History of sports ==
P.N. McWilliam played instrumental role in developing sports in the school. He believed that sports is a significant part of school life. He brought imperial sports ethic in this town through the school. over the years, school sports teams have built up a name of its own in the local sports scene. McWilliam was a patron of Alipurduar Town Club. He also played football for this club. He established fixtures with teams from neighboring towns and tea estates. Author Boria Majumdar in his book "Sport in South Asian Society" wrote, P.N. McWilliam said, most pleasing games were those where McWilliam's team achieved victory over Coochbehar's teams, which were organized by the Maharaja of Cooch Behar with top players from Calcutta playing for them sometimes. There is a famous story of McWilliam, delayed before a match against Coochbehar, ran from railway trolley straight to the ground and scored a goal after playing for one minute.

== Alumni ==
Many meritorious students of this institution are scholars of foreign universities and institutes of national importance in India.

== Notable alumni ==
- Writer and social worker Anjan Roy is one of them who studied in Washington University in St. Louis.
- Sourit Bhattacharya, Lecturer in Global Anglophone Literature Studies at University of Edinburgh, Scotland.
- Subhajit Singha, editor of films such as Cinemawala, Bishorjan, Nirontor (2020) etc.
