= Madarihat Assembly constituency =

Madarihat (ST)
- Constituency No. 14 for the West Bengal Legislative Assembly
- Interactive Map Outlining Madarihat (ST) Assembly Constituency

Constituency details
- Country: India
- Region: East India
- State: West Bengal
- District: Alipurduar
- Lok Sabha constituency: Alipurduars (ST)
- Established: 1962
- Total electors: 194,663
- Reservation: ST

Member of Legislative Assembly
- 18th West Bengal Legislative Assembly
- Incumbent Laxuman Limbu
- Party: Bharatiya Janata Party
- Elected year: 2026

Most Successful parties from Madarihat (ST) assembly
1. Revolutionary Socialist Party (12 times) (70.6%)
2. Bharatiya Janata Party (3 times) (17.6%)
3. Indian National Congress (1 time) (5.88%)
4. All India Trinamool Congress (1 time) (5.88%)

Madarihat (ST) Assembly constituency is an assembly constituency in Alipurduar district in the Indian state of West Bengal. It is reserved for scheduled tribes.

== Overview ==
As per orders of the Delimitation Commission, No. 14 Madarihat Assembly constituency (ST) covers Madarihat-Birpara community development block and Binnaguri and Sakoyajhora I gram panchayats of Dhupguri community development block.

Madarihat Assembly constituency (ST) is part of No. 2 Alipurduars (Lok Sabha constituency) (ST).

== Members of the Legislative Assembly ==
Election Year	Name of M.L.A.	Party Affiliation
1962	A.H. Besterwitch	Revolutionary Socialist Party
1967	D. N. Rai	Indian National Congress
1969	A.H. Besterwitch	Revolutionary Socialist Party
1971	A.H. Besterwitch	Revolutionary Socialist Party
1972	A.H. Besterwitch	Revolutionary Socialist Party
1977	A.H. Besterwitch	Revolutionary Socialist Party
1982	Sushil Kujur	Revolutionary Socialist Party
1987	Sushil Kujur	Revolutionary Socialist Party
1991	Sushil Kujur	Revolutionary Socialist Party
1996	Sushil Kujur	Revolutionary Socialist Party
2001	Kumari Kujur	Revolutionary Socialist Party
2006	Kumari Kujur	Revolutionary Socialist Party
2011	Kumari Kujur	Revolutionary Socialist Party
2016	Manoj Tigga	Bharatiya Janata Party
2021	Manoj Tigga	Bharatiya Janata Party
2024 by-election	Jay Prakash Toppo	All India Trinamool Congress
2026	Laxuman Limbu	Bharatiya Janata Party

== Election results ==
=== 2026 ===
In the 2026 West Bengal Legislative Assembly election, Laxuman Limbu of BJP defeated his nearest rival Jayprakash Toppo of TMC by 40,910 votes.

2026 West Bengal Legislative Assembly election: Madarihat (ST)
Party	Candidate	Votes	%	±%
BJP	Laxuman Limbu	102,488	57.98	▲23.15
AITC	Jayprakash Toppo	61,578	34.84	▼19.21
RSP	Subhash Lohar	3,129	1.77	▼0.56
INC	Joy Prafful Lakra	3,029	1.71	▼0.35
BSP	Ishak Rabha	1,406	0.8	New entry
IND	Saradip Narjeenary	1,226	0.69	New entry
GSP	Babita Bara Tirkey	888	0.5	New entry
MPI	Haren Rabha	638	0.36	New entry
SUCI(C)	Sudhist Baraik	491	0.28	New entry
NOTA	Nota	1,880	1.06	▼0.89
Majority		40,910	23.14	▲3.92
Turnout		176,753	90.8	▲24.54
Registered electors		194,663		▼11.95
BJP gain from AITC		Swing	21.18	

=== 2024 bypoll ===
2024 West Bengal Legislative Assembly by-election: Madarihat
Party	Candidate	Votes	%	±%
AITC	Jay Prakash Toppo	79,186	54.05	▲17.49
BJP	Rahul Lohar	51,018	34.83	▼19.52
Independent	Budhiman Lama (Tamang)	5,061	3.45	New
RSP	Padam Oraon	3,412	2.33	▼1.91
INC	Bikash Champramary	3,023	2.06	New
NOTA	None of the Above	2,856		
Majority		28,168		
Turnout		144,556		
AITC gain from BJP		Swing		

=== 2021 ===
In the 2021 West Bengal Legislative Assembly election, Manoj Tigga of BJP defeated his nearest rival Rajesh Lakra of TMC.

2021 West Bengal Legislative Assembly election: Madarihat
Party	Candidate	Votes	%	±%
BJP	Manoj Tigga	90,718	54.35	
AITC	Rajesh Lakra	61,033	36.56	
RSP	Subhash Lohar	7,072	4.24	
BSP	Uttam Barua	1,696	1.02	
BTP	Vivek Pradeep Tete	1,540	0.92	
NOTA	None of the above	2,622	1.57	
Majority		29,685	17.79	
Turnout		166,920	78.49	
BJP hold		Swing		

=== 2016 ===
In the 2016 West Bengal Legislative Assembly election, Manoj Tigga of BJP defeated his nearest rival Padam Lama of TMC.

2016 West Bengal Legislative Assembly election: Madarihat (ST) constituency
Party	Candidate	Votes	%	±%
BJP	Manoj Tigga	66,989	43.98	Winner
AITC	Padam Lama	44,951	29.51	
RSP	Kumari Kujur	29,885	19.62	
JMM	Padam Oraon	3,089	2.03	
SUCI(C)	Sudhist Baraik	2,319	1.52	
None of the Above	None of the above	5,068	3.32	
Majority		22,038	14.47	
Turnout		1,52,301	79.45	
BJP gain from RSP		Swing		

=== 2011 ===
In the 2011 West Bengal Legislative Assembly election, Kumari Kujur of RSP defeated her nearest rival Manoj Tigga of BJP.

2011 West Bengal Legislative Assembly election: Madarihat (ST) constituency
Party	Candidate	Votes	%	±%
RSP	Kumari Kujur	42,539	31.93	Winner
BJP	Manoj Tigga	34,630	26.00	
INC	Atul Subba	26,027	19.54	
JMM	Jerome Lakra	22,541	16.92	
Independent	Ramesh Oraon	4,923	3.70	
Rashtriya Deshaj Party	Samir Beck	2,553	1.92	
Majority		7,909	5.93	
Turnout		1,33,213	82.57	
RSP hold		Swing		

=== 2006 ===
In 2006 and 2001 state assembly elections, Kumari Kujur of RSP won the 14 Madarihat assembly seat (ST) defeating her nearest rivals Atul Suba of Congress and Narendra Nath Karjee of Trinamool Congress respectively. Contests in most years were multi cornered but only winners and runners are being mentioned. Sushil Kujur of RSP defeated Pushpa Rani Lily Kindo of Congress in 1996, Tuna Toppo of Congress in 1991 and 1987, and Jagat Baria of Congress in 1982. A.H. Besterwitch of RSP defeated Dhirendra Narjinary of Congress in 1977.

=== 1972 ===
A.H. Besterwitch of RSP won in 1972, 1971 and 1969. D.N.Rai of Congress won in 1967. A.H.Besterwich of RSP won in 1962.
