= Nani Bhattacharya =

Indian politician (1917–1993)

Member of Parliament, Lok Sabha
- In office 1989–1993
- Preceded by: Atish Chandra Sinha
- Succeeded by: Promothes Mukherjee
- Constituency: Behrampore

Member of the West Bengal Legislative Assembly
- In office 1977-1989
- In office 1967–1969
- Preceded by: Pijush Kanti Mukherjee
- Succeeded by: Narayan Bhattacharya
- Constituency: Alipurduars

Member of the West Bengal Legislative Assembly
- In office 1962–1967
- Preceded by: Anima Hoare
- Succeeded by: Denis Lakra
- Constituency: Kalchini

Personal details
- Born: 6 November 1917 Khagra, Murshidabad
- Died: 11 October 1993 (aged 75)
- Party: Revolutionary Socialist Party
- Education: University of North Bengal (B.A.)

Nani Bhattacharya (6 November 1917 – 11 October 1993) was one of the founder-members of the Revolutionary Socialist Party, trade union activist, minister in West Bengal, and Member of Parliament.

== Early days ==
Nani Bhattacharya was born to Kalidas Bhattacharya at Khagra, Murshidabad district, on 6 November 1917. He passed matriculation from Jiaganj School. He completed his higher education in spite of severe adversities. He studied at Arnakali Tole in Baharampur for sometime and completed his graduation from the University of Calcutta.

In early life, he was a member of Anushilan Samiti. In 1940, he played an important role in the founding of the Revolutionary Socialist Party.

For his participation in the national struggle, he was interned during 1936-38 and imprisoned during 1940–46. He was imprisoned on a number of occasions before and after independence.

== Trade union activities and electoral politics ==
Apart from development of the trade union of the railway workers, he worked amongst the tea garden workers in the Dooars. He was associated with Dooars Cha Bagan Workers’ Union. In 1950, he was editor of the RSP mouth-piece, Ganavarta.

Nani Bhattaharya was elected to the West Bengal state assembly from Alipurduars (Vidhan Sabha constituency) in 1967, 1969, 1977, 1982, and 1987.

He was elected to the Lok Sabha from Baharampur (Lok Sabha constituency) in 1989 and 1991.

In 1967, 1969 and 1977-82 he was the health minister in West Bengal, and during 1982-87 he was irrigation minister in the state.

In 1989, he was state secretary of RSP.

== Death ==
Nani Bhattacharya died on 11 October 1993, at the age of 75.

State Legislative Assembly
Preceded by Anima Hoare (Congress)	Member of the West Bengal Legislative Assembly from Kalchini Assembly constituency 1962–1967	Succeeded by Denis Lakra (Congress)
Preceded by Pijush Kanti Mukherjee (Congress)	Member of the West Bengal Legislative Assembly from Alipurduars Assembly constituency 1967 – 1971	Succeeded by Narayan Bhattacharya (Congress)
Preceded by Narayan Bhattacharya (Congress)	Member of the West Bengal Legislative Assembly from Alipurduars Assembly constituency 1977 – 1989	Succeeded by Nirmal Das (Revolutionary Socialist Party)
Lok Sabha
Preceded by Atish Chandra Sinha	Member of Parliament in Lok Sabha for Behrampore; 1989 – 1993	Succeeded by Pramothes Mukherjee
