= Falakata Assembly constituency =

Constituency of the West Bengal legislative assembly in India

Falakata (SC)
- Constituency No. 13 for the West Bengal Legislative Assembly
- Interactive Map Outlining Falakata (SC) Assembly Constituency

Constituency details
- Country: India
- Region: East India
- State: West Bengal
- District: Alipurduar
- Lok Sabha constituency: Alipurduars (ST)
- Established: 1957
- Total electors: 245,799
- Reservation: SC

Member of Legislative Assembly
- 18th West Bengal Legislative Assembly
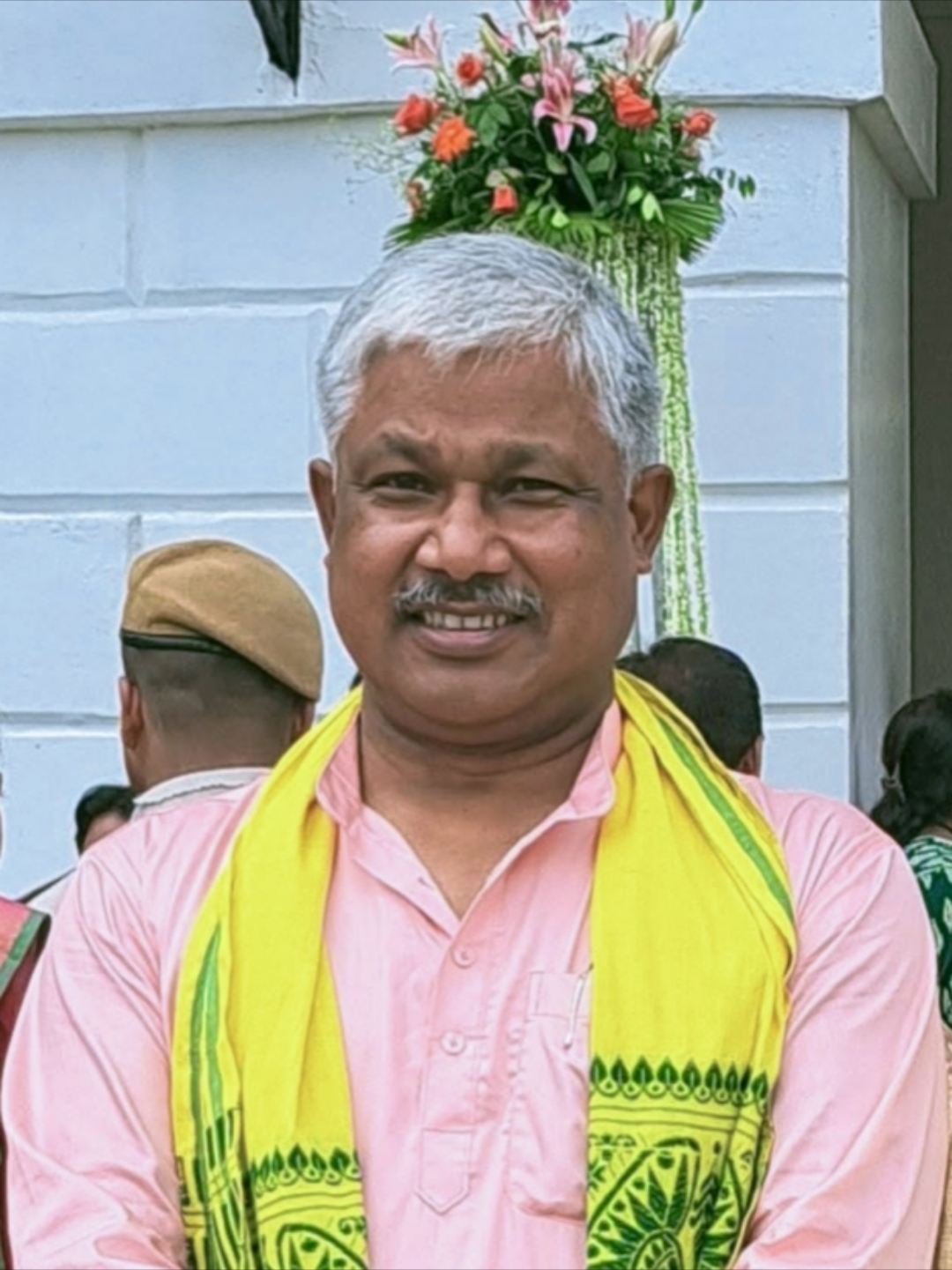
- Incumbent Dipak Barman
- Party: Bharatiya Janata Party
- Elected year: 2026

Most Successful parties from Falakata (SC) assembly
1. Communist Party of India (Marxist) (7 times) (41.2%)
2. Indian National Congress (4 times) (23.5%)
3. Praja Socialist Party (2 times) (11.8%)
4. All India Trinamool Congress (2 times) (11.8%)
5. Bharatiya Janata Party (2 times) (11.8%)

Falakata (SC) Assembly constituency is an assembly constituency in Alipurduar district in the Indian state of West Bengal. It is reserved for scheduled castes.

== Overview ==
As per orders of the Delimitation Commission, No. 13 Falakata Assembly constituency covers Falakata municipality, Falakata community development block and Purba Kanthalbari gram panchayat of Alipurduar I community development block.

Falakata Assembly constituency is part of No. 2 Alipurduars (Lok Sabha constituency) (ST).

== Members of the Legislative Assembly ==
| Election Year | Name of M.L.A. | Party Affiliation |
|---|---|---|
| 1957 | Jagadananda Roy | Praja Socialist Party |
| 1962 | Hiralal Singha | Indian National Congress |
| 1967 | Jagadananda Roy | Praja Socialist Party |
| 1969 | Jagadananda Roy | Indian National Congress |
| 1971 | Jagadananda Roy | Indian National Congress |
| 1972 | Jagadananda Roy | Indian National Congress |
| 1977 | Jogendra Nath Singha Ray | Communist Party of India (Marxist) |
| 1982 | Jogendra Nath Singha Ray | Communist Party of India (Marxist) |
| 1987 | Jogendra Nath Singha Ray | Communist Party of India (Marxist) |
| 1991 | Jogesh Chandra Barman | Communist Party of India (Marxist) |
| 1996 | Jogesh Chandra Barman | Communist Party of India (Marxist) |
| 2001 | Jogesh Chandra Barman | Communist Party of India (Marxist) |
| 2006 | Jogesh Chandra Barman | Communist Party of India (Marxist) |
| 2011 | Anil Adhikari | All India Trinamool Congress |
| 2016 | Anil Adhikari | All India Trinamool Congress |
| 2021 | Dipak Barman | Bharatiya Janata Party |
| 2026 | Dipak Barman | Bharatiya Janata Party |

== Election results ==
=== 2026 ===
In the 2026 West Bengal Legislative Assembly election, Dipak Barman of BJP defeated his nearest rival Subhash Chandra Roy of TMC by 45,999 votes.

2026 West Bengal Legislative Assembly election: Falakata (SC)
| Party | Candidate | Votes | % | ±% |
|---|---|---|---|---|
| BJP | Dipak Barman | 134,370 | 56.95 | ▲10.24 |
| AITC | Subhash Chandra Roy | 88,371 | 37.45 | ▼7.45 |
| CPI(M) | Kamal Kishor Roy | 6,133 | 2.6 | ▼2.29 |
| INC | Akshoy Kumar Barman | 1,855 | 0.79 | New entry |
| SUCI(C) | Ukil Chandra Bhuimali | 1,118 | 0.47 | ▲0.19 |
| KPP(U) | Dipankar Barman | 1,047 | 0.44 | New entry |
| IND | Tarun Barman | 1,033 | 0.44 | New entry |
| IND | Dilip Barman | 594 | 0.25 | New entry |
| NOTA | Nota | 1,432 | 0.61 | ▲0.28 |
| Majority | | 45,999 | 19.5 | ▲17.69 |
| Turnout | | 235,953 | 95.99 | ▲9.37 |
| Registered electors | | 245,799 | | ▼3.44 |
| BJP hold | | Swing | 8.84 | |

=== 2021 ===
In the 2021 West Bengal Legislative Assembly election, Dipak Barman of BJP defeated his nearest rival Subhash Chandra Roy of TMC.

2021 West Bengal Legislative Assembly election: Falakata (SC) constituency
| Party | Candidate | Votes | % | ±% |
|---|---|---|---|---|
| BJP | Dipak Barman | 102,993 | 46.71 | |
| AITC | Subhash Chandra Roy | 99,003 | 44.9 | |
| CPI(M) | Kshitish Chandra Ray | 10,772 | 4.89 | |
| NOTA | None of the above | 1,970 | 0.89 | |
| Majority | | 3,990 | 1.81 | |
| Turnout | | 220,500 | 86.62 | |
| BJP gain from AITC | | Swing | | |

=== 2016 ===
In the 2016 West Bengal Legislative Assembly election, Anil Adhikari of TMC defeated his nearest rival Kshitish Chandra Ray of CPI(M).

2016 West Bengal Legislative Assembly election: Falakata (SC) constituency
| Party | Candidate | Votes | % | ±% |
|---|---|---|---|---|
| AITC | Anil Adhikari | 86,647 | 43.77 | Winner |
| CPI(M) | Kshitish Chandra Ray | 69,808 | 35.27 | |
| BJP | Narayan Chandra Mondal | 30,639 | 15.48 | |
| Independent | Bishnupada Roy | 3,007 | 1.52 | |
| Independent | Paritosh Ch. Roy | 2,016 | 1.02 | |
| SUCI(C) | Tarani Roy | 1,344 | 0.68 | |
| Independent | Naresh Chandra Barman | 667 | 0.34 | |
| None of the Above | None of the Above | 3,812 | 1.93 | |
| Majority | | 16,839 | 8.50 | |
| Turnout | | 1,97,940 | 87.13 | |
| AITC hold | | Swing | | |

=== 2011 ===
In the 2011 West Bengal Legislative Assembly election, Anil Adhikari of TMC defeated his nearest rival Rabindra Nath Barman of CPI(M).

2011 West Bengal Legislative Assembly election: Falakata (SC) constituency
| Party | Candidate | Votes | % | ±% |
|---|---|---|---|---|
| AITC | Anil Adhikari | 77,821 | 47.44 | Winner |
| CPI(M) | Rabindra Nath Barman | 69,775 | 42.54 | |
| BJP | Hemanta Kumar Ray | 9,848 | 6.00 | |
| Independent | Paritosh Ch. Roy | 3,691 | 2.25 | |
| Samajwadi Jan Parishad | Ashok Kumar Roybir | 2,891 | 1.76 | |
| Majority | | 8,046 | 4.90 | |
| Turnout | | 1,64,026 | 86.58 | |
| AITC gain from CPI(M) | | Swing | | |

=== 2006 ===
In the 2006, 2001, 1996 and 1991 state assembly elections, Jogesh Chandra Barman of CPI(M) won the Falakata assembly seat defeating his nearest rivals Anil Adhikari of Trinamool Congress in 2006 and 2001, and Gajendra Nath Barman of Congress in 1996 and 1991. Contests in most years were multi cornered but only winners and runners are being mentioned. Jogendra Nath Singha Roy of CPI(M) defeated Lalit Mohan Roy of Congress in 1987, Jogesh Chandra Ray of Congress in 1982 and Gajendra Nath Barman of Congress in 1977.

=== 1972 ===
Jagadananda Roy of Congress won the seat in 1972, 1971 and 1969. Jagadananda Roy representing PSP won the seat in 1967. Hiralal Singha of Congress won in 1962. Jagadananda Roy of PSP won in 1957.
