= Kalchini Assembly constituency =

Kalchini (ST)
- Constituency No. 11 for the West Bengal Legislative Assembly
- Interactive Map Outlining Kalchini (ST) Assembly Constituency

Constituency details
- Country: India
- Region: East India
- State: West Bengal
- District: Alipurduar
- Lok Sabha constituency: Alipurduars (ST)
- Established: 1957
- Total electors: 222,332
- Reservation: ST

Member of Legislative Assembly
- 18th West Bengal Legislative Assembly
- Incumbent Bishal Lama
- Party: BJP
- Alliance: NDA
- Elected year: 2026

Kalchini Assembly constituency is an assembly constituency in Alipurduar district in the Indian state of West Bengal. It is reserved for scheduled tribes.

Most Successful parties from Kalchini (ST) assembly
1. Indian National Congress (8 times) (47.1%)
2. Revolutionary Socialist Party (4 times) (23.5%)
3. Independent (2 times) (11.8%)
4. Bharatiya Janata Party (2 time) (11.8%)
5. All India Trinamool Congress (1 time) (5.88%)

== Overview ==
As per orders of the Delimitation Commission, No. 11 Kalchini Assembly constituency (ST) covers Kalchini community development block and Majherdabri gram panchayat of Alipurduar II community development block.

Kalchini Assembly constituency is part of No. 2 Alipurduars Lok Sabha constituency.

== Members of the Legislative Assembly ==
Year	Name	Party
1957	Debendranath Brahma Mandal	Indian National Congress
1962	Nani Bhattacharya	Revolutionary Socialist Party
1967	Denis Lakra	Indian National Congress
1969	Denis Lakra	Indian National Congress
1971	Denis Lakra	Indian National Congress
1972	Denis Lakra	Indian National Congress
1977	Denis Lakra	Indian National Congress
1982	Manohar Tirkey	Revolutionary Socialist Party
1987	Khudiram Pahan	Indian National Congress
1991	Manohar Tirkey	Revolutionary Socialist Party
1996	Manohar Tirkey	Revolutionary Socialist Party
2001	Paban Kumar Lakra	Indian National Congress
2006	Manohar Tirkey	Revolutionary Socialist Party
2009^ (Note: Independent supported by GJM)	Wilson Champramary	Independent politician
2011	Wilson Champramary	Independent politician
2016	Wilson Champramary	All India Trinamool Congress
2021	Bishal Lama	Bharatiya Janata Party
2026	Bishal Lama	Bharatiya Janata Party

^ by-election

== Election results ==
Vote share of Winning candidates
2026	56.64%
2021	52.65%
2016	34.99%
2011	30.05%
2009 (by-poll)	29.81%
2006	45.94%
2001	44.11%
1996	46.20%
1991	48.92%
1987	49.43%
1982	55.43%
1977	57.53%
1972	51.48%
1971	38.76%
1969	63.18%
1967	51.09%
1962	43.35%
1957 (Seat-2)	28.30%
1957 (Seat-1)	23.56%

=== 2026 ===
2026 West Bengal Legislative Assembly election: Kalchini (ST)
Party	Candidate	Votes	%	±%
BJP	Bishal Lama	114,759	56.64	▲3.99
AITC	Birendra Bara (Oraon)	76,916	37.96	▼0.10
INC	Anjan Chik Baraik	3,186	1.57	▼1.23
RSP	Passang Sherpa	2,405	1.19	
NOTA	None of the above	1,795	0.89	▼0.32
Majority		37,843	18.68	▲4.09
Turnout		202,607	91.13	▲11.99
BJP hold		Swing		

=== 2021 ===
2021 West Bengal Legislative Assembly election: Kalchini (ST)
Party	Candidate	Votes	%	±%
BJP	Bishal Lama	103,104	52.65	▲18.51
AITC	Passang Lama	74,528	38.06	▲3.07
INC	Avijit Narjinary	5,482	2.80	▼5.22
IND	Binay Narjinary	2,425	1.24	
NOTA	None of the above	2,377	1.21	▼1.34
IND	Rekha Lakra (Ekka)	2,251	1.15	
IND	Prakash Kujur	1,869	0.95	
LJP	Chanchal Narjinary	1,164	0.59	
IND	Sukumar Minj	910	0.46	
NPP	Ashok Lama	803	0.41	
BMUP	Hakim Mahali	479	0.24	
JD(U)	Madan Kumar Uraon	423	0.22	
Majority		28,576	14.59	▲13.74
Turnout		195,815	79.14	▼2.11
BJP gain from AITC		Swing		

=== 2016 ===
2016 West Bengal Legislative Assembly election: Kalchini (ST)
Party	Candidate	Votes	%	±%
AITC	Wilson Champramary	62,061	34.99	▲17.09
BJP	Bishal Lama	60,550	34.14	
INC	Avijit Narjinary	14,220	8.02	
RSP	John Philip Xalxo	11,905	6.71	▼18.66
IND	Biswajit Minj	7,458	4.21	
IND	Atul Suba	6,514	3.67	
NOTA	None of the above	4,524	2.55	
JMM	Pankaj Tirkey	2,551	1.44	▼22.03
IND	Sujit Mahali	2,453	1.38	
IND	Rakesh Kiran Indwar	1,954	1.10	
SUCI(C)	Sukhan Munda	1,148	0.65	
IND	Jay Bhadra Karjee	1,087	0.61	
IND	Usha Tamang	931	0.52	
Majority		1,511	0.85	▼3.83
Turnout		177,356	81.25	▼3.43
AITC gain from Independent		Swing		

=== 2011 ===
2011 West Bengal Legislative Assembly election: Kalchini (ST)
Party	Candidate	Votes	%	±%
IND	Wilson Champramary	46,455	30.05	▲0.24
RSP	Binay Bhusan Kerketta	39,210	25.37	▲2.38
JMM	Sandip Ekka	36,285	23.47	
AITC	Paban Kumar Lakra	27,662	17.90	
RADP	Nabin Prakash Kerketta	2,861	1.85	
BSP	Bagrai Marandi	2,096	1.36	
Majority		7,245	4.68	▼0.31
Turnout		154,569	84.68	
Independent hold		Swing		

=== 2009 by-election ===
2009 West Bengal Legislative Assembly by-election: Kalchini (ST)
Party	Candidate	Votes	%	±%
IND	Wilson Champramary	36,091	29.81	
IND	Sandip Ekka	30,056	24.82	
RSP	K. Binay Bhusan	27,832	22.99	▼22.95
INC	Bishaun Munda	23,255	19.21	▼22.48
BJP	Kamal Kujur	3,845	3.18	
Majority		6,035	4.99	▲0.74
Turnout		121,079		
Independent gain from RSP		Swing		

=== 2006 ===
2006 West Bengal Legislative Assembly election: Kalchini (ST)
Party	Candidate	Votes	%	±%
RSP	Manohar Tirkey	52,575	45.94	▲6.80
INC	Paban Kumar Lakra	47,712	41.69	▼2.42
AITC	Ganesh Mahali	5,253	4.59	
IND	Parmeshwar Toppo	3,684	3.22	
IND	Isidore Ekka	2,720	2.38	
IND	Tetari Urao	2,278	1.99	
Majority		4,863	4.25	▼0.72
Turnout		114,446		
RSP hold		Swing		

=== 2001 ===
2001 West Bengal Legislative Assembly election: Kalchini (ST)
Party	Candidate	Votes	%	±%
INC	Paban Kumar Lakra	43,749	44.11	▲0.65
RSP	Manohar Tirkey	38,815	39.14	▼7.06
BJP	Madan Kumar Lama	12,693	12.80	▲9.02
IND	Tetari Oraon	3,922	3.95	
Majority		4,934	4.97	▲2.23
Turnout		99,231	68.79	▼11.10
INC gain from RSP		Swing		

=== 1996 ===
1996 West Bengal Legislative Assembly election: Kalchini (ST)
Party	Candidate	Votes	%	±%
RSP	Manohar Tirkey	48,141	46.20	▼2.72
INC	Khudiram Pahan	45,287	43.46	▼1.92
BJP	Rabindra Kumar Brahma	3,935	3.78	▼0.87
IND	Tetari Oraon	3,570	3.43	
IND	Bandhain Oraon	2,129	2.04	
IND	Emmanuel Melmon Kujur	787	0.76	
IND	Lalmon Lama	355	0.34	
Majority		2,854	2.74	▼0.80
Turnout		109,950	79.89	▲11.27
RSP hold		Swing		

=== 1991 ===
1991 West Bengal Legislative Assembly election: Kalchini (ST)
Party	Candidate	Votes	%	±%
RSP	Manohar Tirkey	39,447	48.92	▲3.32
INC	Khudiram Orao	36,594	45.38	▼4.05
BJP	Kinoo Orao	3,750	4.65	
AMB	Bandhan Orao	547	0.68	
IND	Rameswar Toppo	302	0.37	
Majority		2,853	3.54	▼0.29
Turnout		84,077	68.62	▲2.05
RSP gain from INC		Swing		

=== 1987 ===
1987 West Bengal Legislative Assembly election: Kalchini (ST)
Party	Candidate	Votes	%	±%
INC	Khudiram Pahan	33,668	49.43	▲4.86
RSP	Manohar Tirkey	31,058	45.60	▼9.83
IND	Buluram Pradhan	3,389	4.98	
Majority		2,610	3.83	▼7.03
Turnout		71,454	66.57	▼8.51
INC gain from RSP		Swing		

=== 1982 ===
1982 West Bengal Legislative Assembly election: Kalchini (ST)
Party	Candidate	Votes	%	±%
RSP	Manohar Tirkey	32,600	55.43	▼2.10
INC	Khudiram Pahan	26,216	44.57	▲23.45
Majority		6,384	10.86	▼25.55
Turnout		63,051	75.08	▲19.33
RSP hold		Swing		

=== 1977 ===
1977 West Bengal Legislative Assembly election: Kalchini (ST)
Party	Candidate	Votes	%	±%
RSP	Manohar Tirkey	21,119	57.53	▲19.69
INC	Denish Lakra	7,753	21.12	▼30.36
IND	Khudiram Pahan	5,463	14.88	
JP	Philip Minj	2,372	6.46	
Majority		13,366	36.41	▲22.77
Turnout		38,400	55.75	▼8.73
RSP gain from INC		Swing		

=== 1972 ===
1972 West Bengal Legislative Assembly election: Kalchini (ST)
Party	Candidate	Votes	%	±%
INC	Denis Lakra	15,447	51.48	▲12.72
RSP	John Arther Baxla Uraon	11,353	37.84	▲19.13
IND	Philip Minj	3,203	10.68	
Majority		4,094	13.64	▲6.61
Turnout		31,798	64.48	▲1.98
INC hold		Swing		

=== 1971 ===
1971 West Bengal Legislative Assembly election: Kalchini (ST)
Party	Candidate	Votes	%	±%
INC	Denis Lakra	10,681	38.76	▼24.42
PSP	John Arther Baxia Uraon	8,743	31.73	
RSP	Minj Philar	5,156	18.71	▼16.92
AIFB	Emanuonmelmon Kujur	2,239	8.13	
INC(O)	Rabindra Kumar Brahma	370	1.34	
IND	Rabindra Nath Champramary	366	1.33	
Majority		1,938	7.03	▼20.52
Turnout		29,831	62.50	▲0.01
INC hold		Swing		

=== 1969 ===
1969 West Bengal Legislative Assembly election: Kalchini (ST)
Party	Candidate	Votes	%	±%
INC	Denis Lakra	17,148	63.18	▲12.09
RSP	John Arthur Bukhla Urao	9,671	35.63	
NDF	Rampael Toppo	322	1.19	
Majority		7,477	27.55	▲15.62
Turnout		28,952	62.49	▼2.18
INC hold		Swing		

=== 1967 ===
1967 West Bengal Legislative Assembly election: Kalchini (ST)
Party	Candidate	Votes	%	±%
INC	D. Lakra	14,025	51.09	▲12.70
IND	J. A. B. Uraon	10,749	39.16	
IND	K. Bhagat	2,354	8.57	
IND	H. N. Brama	324	1.18	
Majority		3,276	11.93	▲6.97
Turnout		29,476	64.67	▲12.49
INC gain from RSP		Swing		

=== 1962 ===
1962 West Bengal Legislative Assembly election: Kalchini
Party	Candidate	Votes	%	±%
RSP	Nani Bhattacharya	17,415	43.35	
INC	Anima Hoare	15,422	38.39	
IND	Nilkanta Mukherjee	2,942	7.32	
PSP	Mahendra Chandra Mech	1,991	4.96	
IND	Raphal Toppo	1,407	3.50	
IND	Hari Kanta Sarkar	994	2.47	
Majority		1,993	4.96	
Turnout		43,530	52.18	
RSP gain from INC		Swing		

=== 1957 ===
1957 West Bengal Legislative Assembly election: Kalchini (ST) - 2 seats
Party	Candidate	Votes	%	±%
INC	Debendra Nath Brahma Mandal	29,625	28.30	
INC	Anima Hoare	24,664	23.56	
IND	A. H. Besterwitch	18,041	17.23	
PSP	Mangal Bhagat	14,459	13.81	
IND	Stephen Kujur	12,738	12.17	
IND	Amil Kumar Ghose	5,159	4.93	
Majority		4,961	4.74	
Turnout		104,686	89.07	
INC win (new seat)				
