= Jay Prakash Toppo =

Indian politician

Member of West Bengal Legislative Assembly
- In office 23 November 2024 – 4 May 2026
- Preceded by: Manoj Tigga
- Succeeded by: Laxuman Limbu
- Constituency: Madarihat

Personal details
- Party: All India Trinamool Congress
- Profession: Politician

Jay Prakash Toppo is an Indian politician from West Bengal. He is a former member of the West Bengal Legislative Assembly representing Madarihat Assembly constituency as a member of the All India Trinamool Congress.

== See also ==
- List of chief ministers of West Bengal
- West Bengal Legislative Assembly
