= Manohar Tirkey =

Indian politician (born 1953)

Member of Parliament, Lok Sabha
- In office 16 May 2009 – 16 May 2014
- Preceded by: Joachim Baxla
- Succeeded by: Dasrath Tirkey
- Constituency: Alipurduars

Minister of State for Public Works and Development, West Bengal
- In office 2006–2009
- In office 1991–2001

Member of the West Bengal Legislative Assembly
- In office 11 May 2006 – 16 May 2009
- Preceded by: Paban Kumar Lakra
- Succeeded by: Wilson Champramary
- Constituency: Kalchini
- In office 19 June 1991 – 14 May 2001
- Preceded by: Khudiram Pahan
- Succeeded by: Paban Kumar Lakra
- Constituency: Kalchini
- In office 20 June 1977 – 1987
- Preceded by: Paban Kumar Lakra
- Succeeded by: Khudiram Pahan
- Constituency: Kalchini

Personal details
- Born: 20 November 1953 (age 72)
- Party: Revolutionary Socialist Party
- Spouse: Sitamuni Tirkey
- Profession: Trade Unionist

Manohar Tirkey (born 20 November 1953) is an Indian politician and a member of the 15th Lok Sabha. He was elected on a Revolutionary Socialist Party ticket from Alipurduars (Lok Sabha constituency).

The son of the late Leba Tirkey and late Sundhari Tirkey, he was born at Satali Tea Garden in Jalpaiguri district on 20 November 1953. He was educated at St. Joseph’s High School, Alipurduars. While in school he was the best player in the B.C.Roy Trophy.

An active trade unionist, he is General Secretary of Dooars Cha Bagan Workers’ Union and North Bengal Forest Majdur Union (both affiliated with UTUC) and is a member of the state committee of UTUC and RSP. As a member of the Lok Sabha, he is member of the Committee on Social Justice and Empowerment and Committee on Government Assurances.

Earlier, he was elected to the West Bengal state assembly from Kalchini (Vidhan Sabha constituency) in 2006, 1996, 1991 and 1982. He was minister of state for PWD in 1996–2001 and in the Left Front Ministry in West Bengal in 2006.

State Legislative Assembly
Preceded by Denis Lakra (Congress)	Member of the West Bengal Legislative Assembly from Kalchini Assembly constituency 1982–1987	Succeeded by Khudiram Pahan (Congress)
Preceded by Khudiram Pahan (Congress)	Member of the West Bengal Legislative Assembly from Alipurduars Assembly constituency 1991 – 2001	Succeeded by Paban Kumar Lakra (Congress)
Preceded by Paban Kumar Lakra (Congress)	Member of the West Bengal Legislative Assembly from Alipurduars Assembly constituency 2006 – 2009	Succeeded by Wilson Champamari (Independent)
Lok Sabha
Preceded by Joachim Baxla (Revolutionary Socialist Party)	Member of Parliament in Lok Sabha for Alipurduar; 2009 – 2014	Succeeded by Dasrath Tirkey (All India Trinamool Congress)
