= Manoj Tigga =

Indian politician

- Manoj Tigga as Madarihat MLA

Member of Parliament, Lok Sabha
- Incumbent
- Assumed office 4 June 2024
- Preceded by: John Barla
- Constituency: Alipurduars

Member of West Bengal Legislative Assembly
- In office 2016 – 23 November 2024
- Preceded by: Kumari Kujur
- Succeeded by: Jay Prakash Toppo
- Constituency: Madarihat

Personal details
- Born: 11 May 1972 (age 54)
- Party: Bharatiya Janata Party
- Spouse: Pomy Tigga (m. 2001)
- Parent(s): Shibcharan Tigga and Uraon Ratani
- Education: University of North Bengal (B.Sc in Biology)
- Occupation: Politician

Manoj Tigga (born 11 May 1972) is an Indian politician and a Member of Parliament in the Lok Sabha from Alipurduars, West Bengal elected in the 2024 Indian general election as a member of the Bharatiya Janata Party. He was former member of Legislative assembly representing the Madarihat constituency in West Bengal. In the 2016 West Bengal Legislative Assembly election, Tigga contesting on an election ticket from BJP defeated his nearest rival Padam Lama of TMC by 22,308 votes. He completed his B.Sc. in Biology from A C College, Jalpaiguri, under North Bengal University in 1996.

== Political career ==
He contested 2009 Indian general election from Alipurduars constituency and was defeated by Manohar Tirkey of Revolutionary Socialist Party (India).

== Position held ==
Manoj Tigga is a Member of the Committee on Labour, Textiles and Skill Development.

== Electoral History ==
=== Lok Sabha ===
Year	Constituency	Party	Votes	%	Opponent	Party	Votes	%	Result	Margin	%
2004	Alipurduars	BJP	239,128	28.44	Joachim Baxla	RSP	384,252	45.70	Lost	-145,124	-17.26
2009	Alipurduars	BJP	199,843	21.40	Manohar Tirkey	RSP	384,890	41.22	Lost	-185,047	-19.82
2024	Alipurduars	BJP	695,314	49.66	Prakash Chik Baraik	TMC	619,867	44.27	Won	+75,447	+5.39

=== Legislative Assembly ===
Year	Constituency	Party	Votes	%	Opponent	Party	Votes	%	Result	Margin (votes)	Margin (%)
2011	Madarihat	BJP	34,630	26.00	Kumari Kujur	Revolutionary Socialist Party	42,539	31.93	Lost	–7,909	–5.93
2016	Madarihat	BJP	66,989	43.98	Padam Lama	TMC	44,951	29.51%	Won	22,038	14.39
2021	Madarihat	BJP	90,718	54.35	Rajesh Lakra	TMC	61,033	36.56	Won	29,685	17.79

== Criticism ==
In 2025, he was widely criticized for abusing his position and threatening a government officer over the distribution of flood relief materials.

State Legislative Assembly
Preceded by Kumari Kujur (RSP)	Member of the West Bengal Legislative Assembly from Madarihat Assembly constituency 2016– 2024	Incumbent
