= Vivekananda College, Alipurduar =

College in West Bengal

Vivekananda College
- Type: Undergraduate college Public college
- Established: 1985; 41 years ago
- Affiliations: University of North Bengal
- Principal: Dr. Srijit Das
- Location: Alipurduar, West Bengal, 736121, India; 26.491888°N 89.5265552°E
- Campus: Urban
- Website: vivekananda college alipurduar

Vivekananda College, established in 1985, is a general degree college in Alipurduar. It is in Alipurduar district. It offers undergraduate courses in arts. It is affiliated to University of North Bengal.

== Departments ==
=== Arts ===
- Bengali
- English
- History
- Political Science
- Philosophy
- Education
- Economics

== Facilities ==
College Library: The college has library with more than 11,000 books on different subjects. Students are provided with readers card of the reading room for the library and a Borrowers card which enable them to take out books on loan. These cards are not transferable and must be returned in time. Attempts have been made for the computerization on the same.

Full free and Half free: A good number of half and full free studentships are awarded to students on the basis of academic results and financial conditions. No full free or half free studentship will be awarded to a student who enjoy SC/ST stipend or any other student scholarships, as per government rules.

Government Scholarship: Students belonging to Scheduled Castes and Scheduled Tribes are required to apply through the Principal for Stipends and Scholarships.

Railway Concessions: Students may obtain concession for railway journey to long-distance places if they apply through the Principal on grounds permissible in terms of the Indian Railways.

National Cadet Corps (NCC): All students, both boys & girls, are allowed to opt for enrolment in NCC, if selected by the concerned NCC officers.

National service scheme (NSS): Eligible students are allowed to get enlisted as NSS volunteers under NSS Programme office of the college for doing Social Works.

== Accreditation ==
The college is recognized by the University Grants Commission (UGC). The college applied for NAAC accreditation but failed to clear IIQA first time. Then in March, 2021 NAAC peer team visit was done but the college got D grade. That means non accreditation. This poor result has put the college in dark future.

== See also ==
- List of institutions of higher education in West Bengal
- Education in India
- Education in West Bengal
