= Joachim Baxla =

Indian politician (1955–2017)

Member of Indian parliament
- In office 1996–2009
- Preceded by: Pius Tirkey
- Succeeded by: Manohar Tirkey
- Constituency: Alipurduars

Personal details
- Born: 16 January 1955 Jalpaiguri, West Bengal
- Died: 6 March 2017 (aged 62)
- Party: Trinamool Congress (2010-2017) Revolutionary Socialist Party (1991-2008)
- Spouse: Maloti Baxla
- Children: 1 son and 1 daughter
- As of 17 September, 2006

Joachim Baxla (16 January 1955 – 6 March 2017) was a member of the 14th Lok Sabha of India. He represented the Alipurduars constituency of West Bengal and was a member of the Revolutionary Socialist Party (RSP) political party. He won the Alipurduars seat four times in a row. Baxla was denied a ticket by RSP to contest the 15th Lok Sabha. In protest, he resigned from the RSP and contested the Alipurduar constituency as an independent and lost badly. RSP candidate Manohar Tirkey won the seat. He was relegated to the fourth position. He then joined the Trinamool Congress contesting the 2011 West Bengal Assembly election from the Kumargram (Vidhan Sabha constituency), and again lost the election to his RSP rival Dasrath Tirkey.

Baxla died from cancer on 6 March 2017.

== Sources ==
- Official biographical sketch in Parliament of India website
