= Suman Kanjilal =

Indian politician

Member of the West Bengal Legislative Assembly
- In office 2 May 2021 – 3 May 2026
- Preceded by: Sourav Chakraborty
- Constituency: Alipurduar

Personal details
- Party: Trinamool Congress (2023–present)
- Other political affiliations: Bharatiya Janata Party
- Education: B.N Mandal University, Bihar
- Profession: Politician

Suman Kanjilal is an Indian politician from the Trinamool Congress. In May 2021, he was elected as the member of the West Bengal Legislative Assembly from Alipurduar as BJP candidate. On 5 February 2023, he joined All India Trinamool Congress.

== Career ==
Kanjilal is from Alipurduar district. His father's name is Santosh Kumar Kanjilal. He passed LLB From Surya Deo Law College Under B.N Mandal University Bihar in 2009. He actively served long time as a journalist in Uttarbanga Sambad. He contested 2021 West Bengal Legislative Assembly election from Alipurduar Vidhan Sabha and won the seat on 2 May 2021.
