= Stepping Stone Model School =

Location
- Newtown, Alipurduar, West Bengal, 736121; India; 26.4923644°N 89.5256658°E

Information
- Type: Private
- Established: January 12, 1988; 38 years ago
- Founder: Mita Ghosh
- School board: Council for the Indian School Certificate Examinations
- Principal: Chandan Ghosh, Mita Ghosh
- Grades: Nursery - 12
- Gender: Co-Ed
- Language: English
- Campus type: Urban
- Houses: Power; Peace; Prosperity
- Colours: Bluish White and Grey
- Nickname: SSMS

Stepping Stone Model School is a private English-medium school located in Alipurduar, West Bengal, India. The school is affiliated to the Council for the Indian School Certificate Examinations(CICSE). It was established on January 13, 1988.

== About School ==
Students at this school have often participated in question-and-answer activities with Derek O'Brien. These activities have been reported in The Telegraph newspaper.

This school have won many state - district championship in science. Passed - outs are known to be established in their fields.

The subjects offered are English, Hindi/Bengali, Physics, Chemistry, Biology, Mathematics, Computer Applications, Geography and History for ICSE (10th).

For ISC (12th), students can choose among Bengali/Hindi, Chemistry, Physics, Mathematics, Biology, Computer Science, Economics, Commerce, Accountancy, History, Geography. English is compulsory for students.

== Information ==
- Facilities Provided : Computer Laboratory, Chemistry Laboratory, Sports, Physics Laboratory, Library, Biology Laboratory.
- Extracurricular activities : Sports, Marathon, Badminton, Chess, Table Tennis, Kho-Kho, and Cricket.

== Extracurricular activities ==
=== Inter House Sports ===
Students are divided into three houses — Power, Peace and Prosperity. The Inter House Sports is held between those three houses alternately with the Annual Functions every year.

==== Year wise results ====
Year	Winner	1st Runners up	2nd Runners up
2003	Power	Peace	Prosperity
2005	Power	Prosperity	Peace
2007	Power	Peace	Prosperity
2009	Power	Peace	Prosperity
2011	Prosperity	Power	Peace
2013	Power	Prosperity	Peace
2015	Power	Prosperity	Peace
2017	Power	Peace	Prosperity
2019	Power	Prosperity	Peace
2022	Peace	Power	Prosperity
2024	Power	Peace	Prosperity

== See also ==
- Council for the Indian School Certificate Examinations
- Indian Certificate of Secondary Education
- Council for the Indian School Certificate Examinations
- West Bengal Board of Secondary Education (WBBSE), India
- West Bengal Council of Higher Secondary Education (WBCHSE), India
- Education in India
- List of schools in India
- Education in West Bengal
