= Dooars Cha Bagan Workers' Union =

Trade union in West Bengal, India

- Founded: 1948
- Headquarters: Kalchini, West Bengal, India
- Location: India
- Members: 11,152 (1961)
- Key people: Manohar Tirkey, General Secretary
- Affiliations: United Trade Union Congress

The Dooars Cha Bagan Workers' Union is a trade union of tea plantation labourers in the Dooars in northern West Bengal, India. It is affiliated to the United Trade Union Congress, the labour wing of the Revolutionary Socialist Party. Historically it held a strong influence among tea plantation labourers in the eastern Dooars. As of 2010, its general secretary was Manohar Tirkey.

The Dooars Cha Bagan Workers' Union emerged in 1948. The first RSP-controlled tea plantation workers union was established at the Sarugaon Tea Estate. Subsequently, the union established its presence in the Majherdabri, Kohinoor and Mathura tea estates. Its founding president was Brojen Das and its general secretary was Suresh Talukdar. The union was registered in the same year. As of 1961, it claimed 11,152 members.

In the 1960s, A.H. Besterwitch served as general secretary of the union. Its offices were located in Kalchini for many years.

During the years of the Emergency in the 1970s, the organisers of union suffered from violent attacks from the plantation owners. At this point, its general secretary was Nani Bhattacharya.

As of 2005, DCBWU was the third largest union in the tea plantation sector in the region. However, the union has lost ground after the entry of the Akhil Bharatiya Adivasi Vikas Parishad in the tea plantation union sector.
