= Dipak Barman =

Indian politician

- দীপক বর্মণ
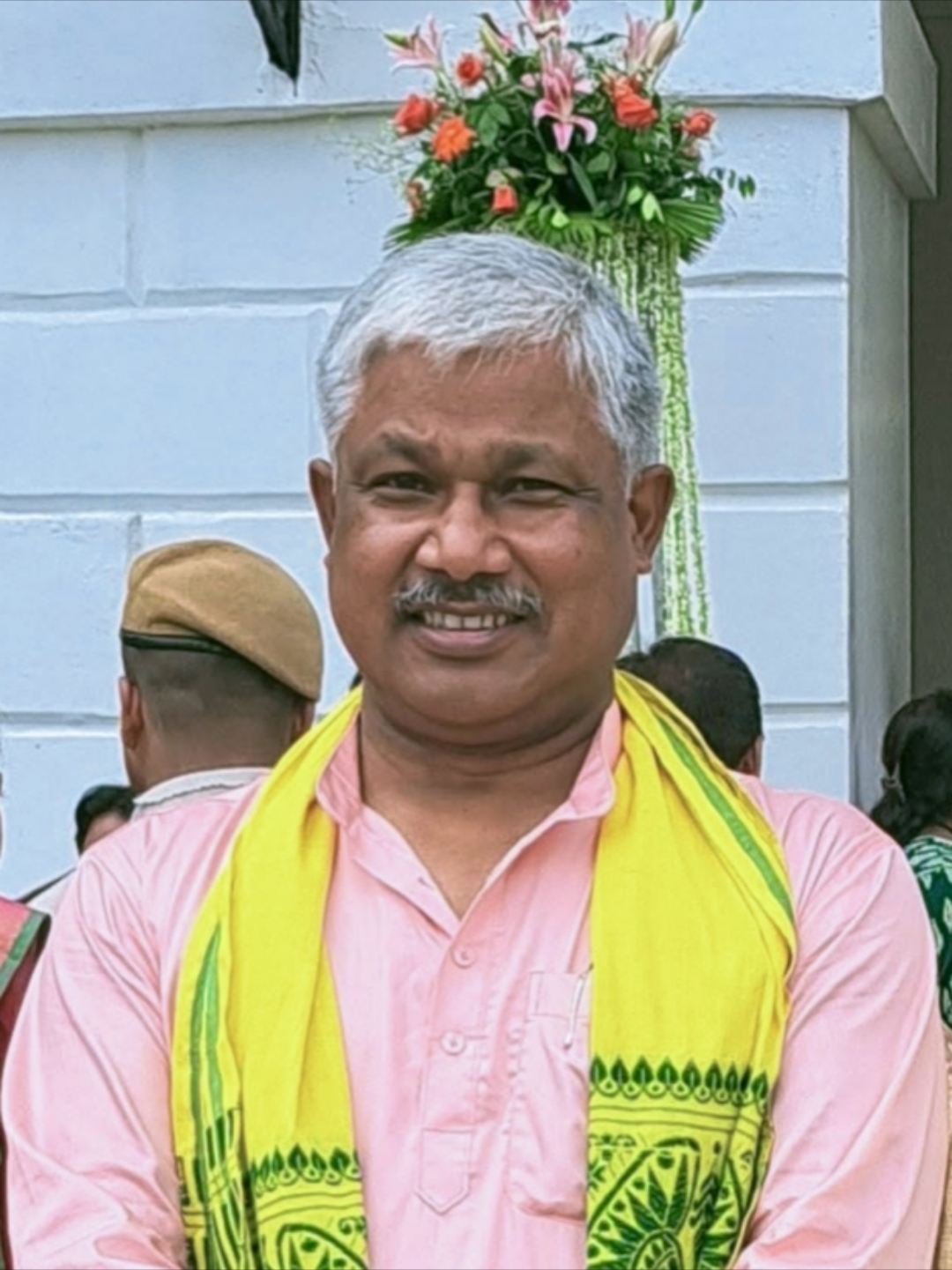
- Barman in 2026

Minister of School Education, Government of West Bengal
- Incumbent
- Assumed office 1 June 2026
- Governor: R. N. Ravi
- Chief Minister: Suvendu Adhikari
- Preceded by: Bratya Basu

Member of the West Bengal Legislative Assembly
- Incumbent
- Assumed office 2 May 2021
- Preceded by: Anil Adhikari
- Constituency: Falakata

Personal details
- Party: BJP
- Parent: Suresh Chandra Barman (father)
- Education: North Bengal University, (MA, B.Ed)
- Occupation: Head Teacher
- Profession: Politician

Dipak Barman is an Indian politician from West Bengal. In May 2021, he was elected as the member of the West Bengal Legislative Assembly from Falakata.

== Career ==
Barman is from Falakata, Alipurduar district. His father's name is Suresh Chandra Barman. He has completed M.A. in English from North Bengal University in 1999 and B.Ed. from North Bengal University in 2005. He served as a Headmaster of Deogaon High School(H.S), Falakata. He contested 2021 West Bengal Legislative Assembly election from Falakata Vidhan Sabha and won the seat on 2 May 2021.

On 1 June 2026, he was sworn in as a Cabinet Minister of West Bengal, along with twelve other members.
