= Bishal Lama =

Indian politician

Minister of State, Home & Hill Affairs, Minority & Madarsa Education Government of West Bengal
- Incumbent
- Assumed office 1 June 2026
- Governor: R. N. Ravi
- Chief Minister: Suvendu Adhikari

Member of the West Bengal Legislative Assembly
- Incumbent
- Assumed office 2 May 2021
- Preceded by: Wilson Champramary
- Constituency: Kalchini

Personal details
- Party: BJP
- Education: North Bengal University
- Profession: Politician

Bishal Lama (born 1982) is an Indian politician from West Bengal. He is a member of the West Bengal Legislative Assembly from Kalchini representing the Bharatiya Janata Party. He is currently serving as the Minister of State of West Bengal.

== Early life and education ==
Lama is from Kalchini, Alipurduar district. His father's name is Praduman Lama. He passed B.A. at North Bengal University.

== Career ==
In May 2021, he won from Kalchini Assembly constituency in the 2021 West Bengal Legislative Assembly election. He polled 103,104 votes and defeated his nearest rival, Pasang Lama of the All India Trinamool Congress, by a margin of 28,576 votes.
