= Alipurduar =

- City
- Location in West Bengal, India Alipurduar (India)
- Coordinates: 26.489°N 89.527°E
- Country: India
- State: West Bengal
- District: Alipurduar

Government
  - Type: Municipality
  - Body: Alipurduar Municipality
  - Chairman: Vacant
  - Vice-Chairman: Vacant
  - Lok Sabha MP: Manoj Tigga (BJP)
  - MLA: Paritosh Das (BJP)

Area
  - Total: 8.98 km^{2} (3.47 sq mi)
- Elevation: 93 m (305 ft)

Population (2011)
  - Total: 127,342
  - Density: 14,200/km^{2} (36,700/sq mi)

Languages
  - Official: Bengali
  - Additional official: English
- Time zone: UTC+5:30 (IST)
- PIN: 736121, 736122 & 736123
- Telephone code: 03564
- ISO 3166 code: IN-WB
- Vehicle registration: WB-70/WB-69
- Lok Sabha: Alipurduars
- Vidhan Sabha: Alipurduars
- Website: www.alipurduarmunicipality.in

Alipurduar (Bengali pronunciation: [alipurduar]), is a city in the Indian state of West Bengal. It is the headquarters of the Alipurduar district and Alipurduar railway division of NFR. It is situated in the Western Dooars natural region, on the banks of Kaljani River in the foothills of the Himalayas. The city is a gateway to Bhutan.

== Etymology ==
Alipurduar's name originates from Colonel Hedayat Ali Khan, a British officer who fought in the 1865 Bhutan War and was stationed there, combined with "Duar" (or Door), representing its role as a gateway to the Dooars region of the Himalayas.

== Geography ==
=== Location ===
Alipurduar is located at 26.489°N 89.527°E.

=== Area overview ===
Alipurduar district is covered by two maps. It is an extensive area in the eastern end of the Dooars in West Bengal. It is undulating country, largely forested, with numerous rivers flowing down from the outer ranges of the Himalayas in Bhutan. It is a predominantly rural area with 79.38% of the population living in the rural areas. The district has 1 municipal town and 20 census towns, and that means that 20.62% of the population lives in the urban areas. The scheduled castes and scheduled tribes, taken together, form more than half the population in all the six community development blocks in the district. There is a high concentration of tribal people (scheduled tribes) in the three northern blocks of the district.

== Demographics ==
In the 2011 census, Alipurduar Urban Agglomeration had a population of 127,342, out of which 64,898 were males and 62,444 were females. The 0–6 years population was 10,545. Effective literacy rate for the 7+ population was 89.16 per cent.

As of 2001 census, Alipurduar had a population of 73,047. Males constitute 51% of the population and females 49%. Alipurduar has an average literacy rate of 78%, higher than the national average of 59.5%; with 54% of the males and 46% of females literate. 10% of the population is under 6 years of age.

=== Languages ===
Languages spoken in Alipurduar Town (2011)
1. Bengali (88.6%)
2. Hindi (8.97%)
3. Bhojpuri (0.60%)
4. Marwari (0.44%)
5. Nepali (0.30%)
6. Others (1.13%)

Bengali is the official and most commonly spoken language of the city, followed a sizeable number of Hindi speakers.

== Transport ==
=== Railways ===
Two main railway stations: New Alipurduar (NOQ) and Alipurduar Junction (APDJ) serves the city of Alipurduar. From these stations, multiple trains all across India are available.

=== Roadways ===
The city is well connected to all parts of India, via roadways, National Highway 17 and National Highway 27 runs through the city. Multiple and frequent Buses, cabs, taxis etc are available to nearby cities like Siliguri, Guwahati, Bongaigaon, Cooch Behar etc.

=== Airways ===
The nearest commercial airport is Cooch Behar Airport in Cooch Behar around 30 kilometres road distance from Alipurduar, and Bagdogra International Airport in Siliguri around 150 kilometres away from the city, Apart from these there is Hasimara Air Force Station nearby in Hasimara.

== Education ==
=== Schools ===
- Stepping Stone Model School (ICSE Board)
- McWilliam Higher Secondary School

=== Colleges ===
- Alipurduar University
- Vivekananda College, Alipurduar (affiliated with University of North Bengal)
- Industrial Training Institute (ITI), Birpara
- Alipurduar Government Engineering and Management College
Places and tea estates in the western portion of Alipurdar subdivision (including Madarihat-Birpara, Falakata and Alipuduar I CD blocks) in Alipurduar district
CT: census town, R: rural/ urban centre, N: neighbourhood, NP: national park/ wildlife sanctuary, TE: tea estate
Abbreviations used in names – TG for Tea Garden (town/village), TE for Tea Estate
Owing to space constraints in the small map, the actual locations in a larger map may vary slightly
Places and tea estates in the eastern portion of Alipurdar subdivision (including Kalchini, Kumargram and Alipuduar II CD blocks) in Alipurduar district
CT: census town, R: rural/ urban centre, N: neighbourhood, A: Air Force Station, NP: national park/ wildlife sanctuary, TE: tea estate, H: historical site
Abbreviations used in names – TG for Tea Garden (town/village), TE for Tea Estate
Owing to space constraints in the small map, the actual locations in a larger map may vary slightly

Note: The map presents some of the notable locations in the subdivision. All places marked in the map are linked in the larger full screen map.

== See also ==
- Alipurduars (Lok Sabha constituency)
- Alipurduar district
