= Jogesh Dutta =

Indian mime

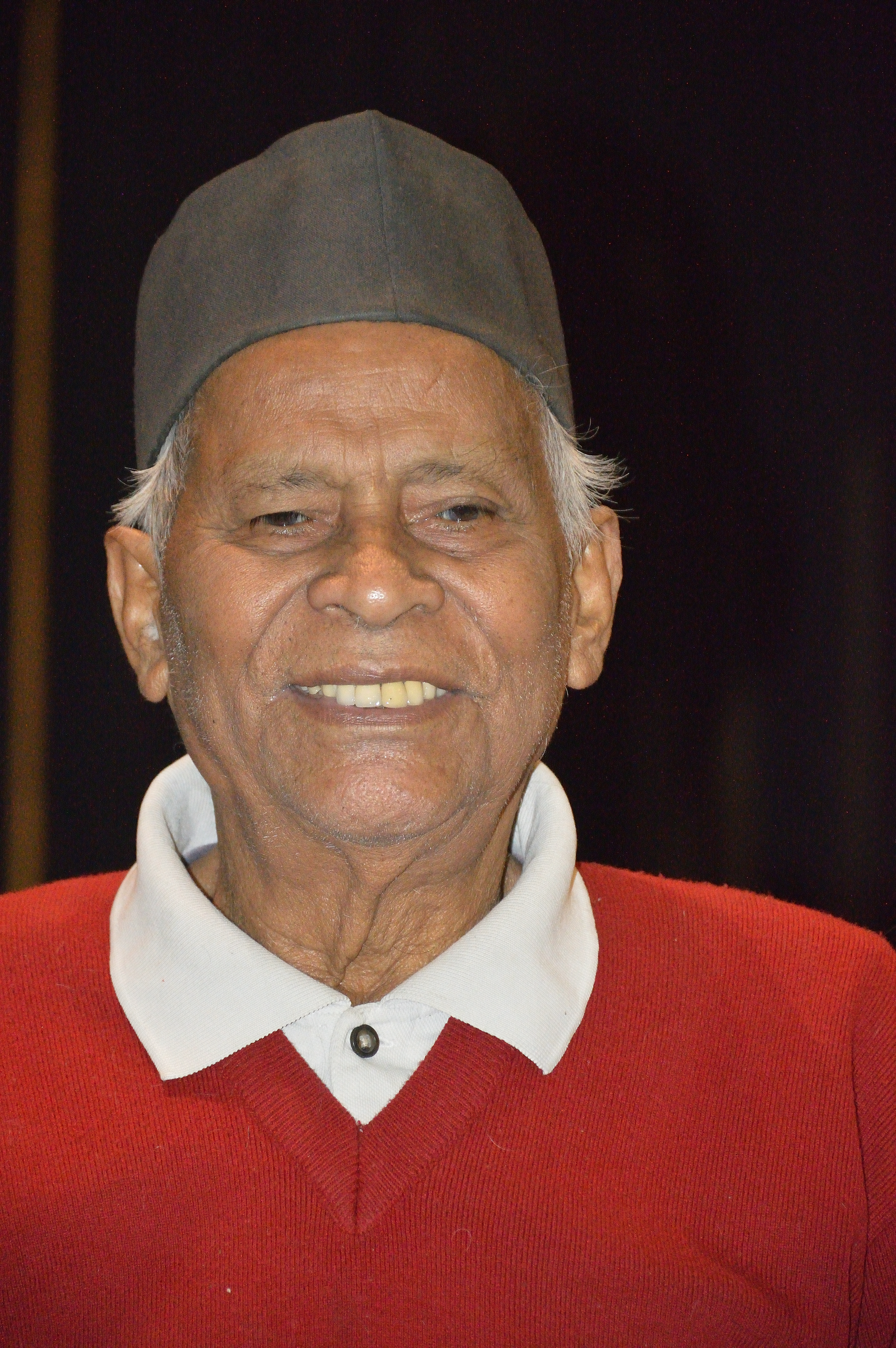
Jogesh Dutta in Kolkata, Feb. 2018.

Jogesh Dutta (born 1935) is an Indian mime who for over fifty years, pioneered the art of mime in India.

== Early life ==
Born in 1935 in Faridpur District of Bangladesh, Datta spent almost 11 years of his life in his native village at Haatshiruaail. When India awoke to a 'new dawn' on 15 August 1947, a 15-year-old boy, his parents and five siblings found themselves on a platform at Calcutta's Sealdah railway station. Penniless refugees from East Pakistan, the family, like lakhs of others, faced a dark future; soon an orphan at the mercy of distant relatives, he washed dishes at a tea stall, was a grocer's assistant and worked at a construction site before finding his true calling. While his inspiration was Charlie Chaplin, Jogesh keenly observed young couples snatching a few private moments on the banks of a lake in the city and started imitating them, much to the delight of his friends and associates. In 1956, he created his first real mime act—a lady dressing up in front of a mirror. The same year, he regaled spectators with this, in what was also his first stage mime performance, at Bally near Kolkata. Initially a comic and an actor, Jogesh was a founder-member of Sundaram and acted in two early plays: Pather Panchali and Mrityur Chokhe Jol (1959) by Manoj Mitra. Learning by himself, Jogesh was unaware of the traditions of mime or the ancient Natyashastra. Dutta considered 1960 his breakthrough year when performances at the National Youth Festival in Calcutta led to a flow of invitations to perform from all over the country and later the world.

== Career ==
As an exponent of Indian culture he has circled the globe several times, bringing a tribute from abroad several times including U.K., u.s.a., U.S.S.R., Germany, France, Czechoslovakia, Romania, Bulgaria, Holland, Afghanistan, the Middle East, Canada, etc. He was a delegate to the 9th World Festival of Youth and Students in Sofia (Bulgaria) in 1968. He was awarded as a performing artiste at the 10th world fair held in G.D.R. in 1973. The Films Division made a documentary on him in 14 Indian languages in 1983; further documentaries were made by Germany, Britain and France.

== Jogesh Mime Akademi ==
He formed his troupe Podaboli in 1971 that became the Jogesh Mime Akademi in 1975 with the help of the Bengal government; it is affiliated with the Sangeet Natak Akademi and Rabindra Bharati University. There he imparts his talents and technique to budding artists such as he once was, having retired from the stage in 2009. It has a four-year course that has students from India, Bangladesh, Nepal and Switzerland. Dutta's Silent Village for the physically challenged has mime as an optional vocation.

== Dutta’s final act ==
Dutta's final appearance on stage was in his hugely popular The Thief at the Rabindra Sadan in 2009. "I’m old and can’t take the rigours of staging an act anymore. Mime shows require agility and swift physical movement and that’s becoming difficult for me," he said. Jogesh reappeared after his final show on stage, dressed in white shirt and trousers, and laid his wig and costume on the floor. As the 'poet of silence' he didn't utter a word. To those who clamoured for the show to go on, he assured that he would continue to teach mime. And thus, mime will live on.

== Awards ==
- 1985: Shiromani Purashkar
- 1993: Sangeet Natak Akademi award
