= Paritosh Das =

Indian politician in West Bengal

Member of the West Bengal Legislative Assembly
- Incumbent
- Assumed office 4 May 2026
- Preceded by: Suman Kanjilal
- Constituency: Alipurduars

Personal details
- Party: Bharatiya Janata Party
- Profession: Politician

Paritosh Das is an Indian politician from West Bengal. He is a member of West Bengal Legislative Assembly, from Alipurduars Assembly constituency.
