= Jogesh Chandra Barman =

Indian politician (died 2019)

MLA of Falakata Vidhan Sabha Constituency
- In office 1991–2011
- Preceded by: Jogendra Nath Singha Roy
- Succeeded by: Anil Adhikari

Forest Minister of West Bengal Government
- In office 1996–2006

Backward Class Welfare Minister of West Bengal Government
- In office 2006–2011

Personal details
- Born: 4 November 1949
- Died: 10 February 2019 (aged 69)
- Party: Communist Party of India (Marxist)
- Spouse: Mrs.Niyati Barman
- Children: Mrs.Sharmistha Roy, Mr.Dhrubajyoti Barman

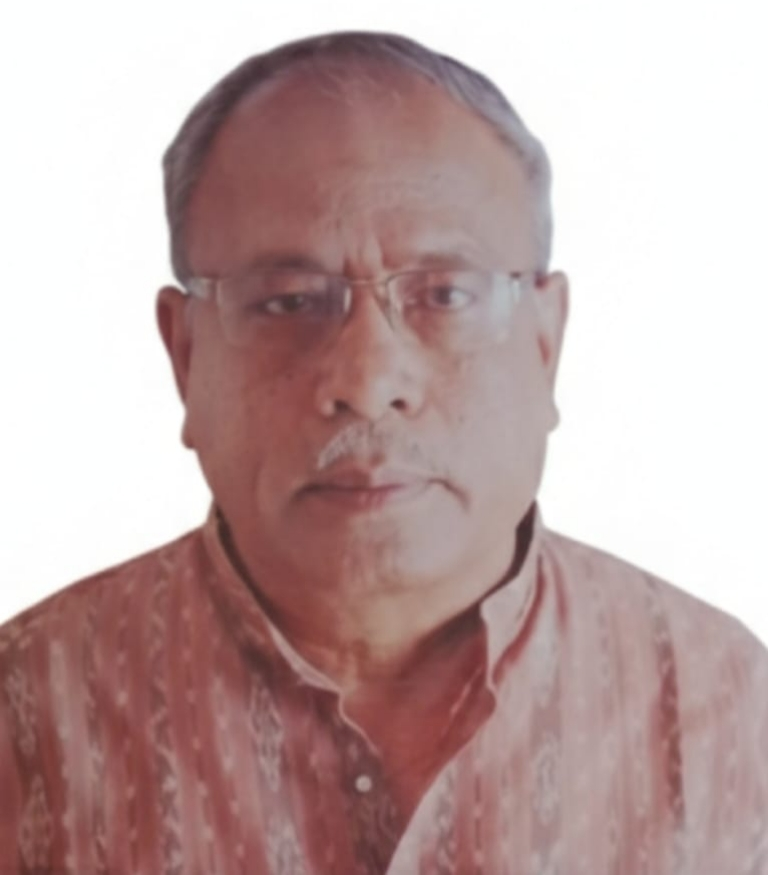
Jogesh Chandra Barman, Former MLA.

Jogesh Chandra Barman was an Indian politician. He was elected as MLA of Falakata Vidhan Sabha Constituency in West Bengal Legislative Assembly 1991, 1996, 2001 and 2006. He was the Forest and Backward Class Welfare Minister of West Bengal Government. He died on 10 February 2019 at the age of 69.
