= Kumargram Assembly constituency =

Kumargram (ST)
- Constituency No. 10 for the West Bengal Legislative Assembly
- Interactive Map Outlining Kumargram (ST) Assembly Constituency

Constituency details
- Country: India
- Region: East India
- State: West Bengal
- District: Alipurduar
- Lok Sabha constituency: Alipurduars (ST)
- Established: 1967
- Total electors: 260,288
- Reservation: ST

Member of Legislative Assembly
- 18th West Bengal Legislative Assembly
- Incumbent Manoj Kumar Oraon
- Party: Bharatiya Janata Party
- Elected year: 2026

Most Successful parties from Kamargram (ST) assembly
1. Revolutionary Socialist Party (9 times) (56.2%)
2. Indian National Congress (4 times) (25.0%)
3. Bharatiya Janata Party (2 times) (12.5%)
4. All India Trinamool Congress (1 time) (6.25%)

Kumargarm is an assembly constituency in Alipurduar district in the Indian state of West Bengal. It is reserved for scheduled tribes.

== Overview ==
As per orders of the Delimitation Commission, No. 10 Kumargram (ST) covers Kumargram community development block and Bhatibari, Kohinoor, Mahakalguri Parokata, Samuktala, Tatpara I and Turturi gram panchayats in Alipurduar II community development block.

Kumargram Assembly constituency is part of No. 2 Alipurduars (Lok Sabha constituency) (ST).

== Members of the Legislative Assembly ==
Year	Name	Party
1967	Pijushkanti Mukherjee	Indian National Congress
1969	Pijushkanti Mukherjee	Indian National Congress
1971	Pijushkanti Mukherjee	Indian National Congress
1972	Debabrata Chatterjee	Indian National Congress
1977	John Arther Baxla	Revolutionary Socialist Party
1982	Subodh Oraon	Revolutionary Socialist Party
1987	Subodh Oraon	Revolutionary Socialist Party
1991	Salib Toppo	Revolutionary Socialist Party
1996	Salib Toppo	Revolutionary Socialist Party
2001	Dasrath Tirkey	Revolutionary Socialist Party
2006	Dasrath Tirkey	Revolutionary Socialist Party
2011	Dasrath Tirkey	Revolutionary Socialist Party
2014^	Manoj Kumar Oraon	Revolutionary Socialist Party
2016	James Kujur	All India Trinamool Congress
2021	Manoj Kumar Oraon	Bharatiya Janata Party
2026	Manoj Kumar Oraon	Bharatiya Janata Party

- ^ by-election

== Election results ==
Vote share of Winning candidates
2026	57.95%
2021	48.16%
2016	37.27%
2014 (Bye-Poll)	34.79%
2011	40.84%
2006	53.92%
2001	54.98%
1996	52.21%
1991	52.21%
1987	58.21%
1982	56.27%
1977	53.75%
1972	67.90%
1971	43.94%
1969	48.19%
1967	41.30%

=== 2026 ===
In the 2026 West Bengal Legislative Assembly election, Manoj Kumar Oraon of BJP defeated his nearest rival Rajeev Tirkey of TMC by 52,877 votes.

2026 West Bengal Legislative Assembly election: Kumargram (ST)
Party	Candidate	Votes	%	±%
BJP	Manoj Kumar Oraon	143,044	57.95	▲9.79
AITC	Rajeev Tirkey	90,167	36.53	▼6.9
RSP	Kishor Minj	4,111	1.67	▼3.17
INC	Sudham Lama	2,261	0.92	▼7.57
IND	Bikash Oraon	1,791	0.73	New entry
IND	Paulus Tudu	873	0.35	New entry
AJUP	Unilish Mochari	461	0.19	New entry
IND	Abkari Kujur	423	0.17	New entry
SUCI(C)	Ram Oraon	279	0.11	New entry
IND	Amit Chompramari	248	0.1	New entry
GSP	Sushil Minz	245	0.1	New entry
NOTA	Nota	2,924	1.18	▲0.01
Majority		52,877	21.42	▲16.69
Turnout		246,827	94.83	▲9.65
Registered electors		260,288		▲9.65
BJP hold		Swing	8.34	

=== 2021 ===
In the 2021 West Bengal Legislative Assembly election, Manoj Kumar Oraon of BJP defeated his nearest rival Leos Kujur of TMC.

2021 West Bengal Legislative Assembly election: Kumargram
Party	Candidate	Votes	%	±%
BJP	Manoj Kumar Oraon	111,974	48.16	
AITC	Leos Kujur	100,973	43.43	
RSP	Kishor Minz	11,253	4.84	
NOTA	None of the above	2,718	1.17	
Majority		11,001	4.73	
Turnout		232,489	85.18	
BJP gain from AITC		Swing		

=== 2016 ===
In the 2016 West Bengal Legislative Assembly election, James Kujur of TMC defeated his nearest rival Manoj Kumar Oraon of RSP.

2016 West Bengal Legislative Assembly election: Kumargram (ST) constituency
Party	Candidate	Votes	%	±%
AITC	James Kujur	77,668	37.27	Winner
RSP	Manoj Kumar Oraon	71,515	34.32	
BJP	Leos Kujur	45,137	21.66	
JMM	Vinay Kr. Minj	3,296	1.58	
BSP	Eliash Narjinary	2,737	1.31	
SUCI(C)	Ram Oraon	2,179	1.05	
NOTA	None of the Above	5,874	2.82	
Majority		6,153	2.95	
Turnout		2,08,406	85.64	
AITC gain from RSP		Swing		

=== 2014 ===
In the bye-elections held in 2014, Manoj Kumar Oraon of RSP defeated Joachim Baxla of AITC by 2,667 votes.

2014 West Bengal Legislative Assembly bye- election: Kumargram (ST) constituency
Party	Candidate	Votes	%	±%
RSP	Manoj Kumar Oraon	65,634	34.79	
AITC	Joachim Baxla	62,967	33.38	
BJP	Binod Minj	44,039	23.34	
INC	Clement Dungdung	16,020	8.49	
NOTA	None of the above	4,377		
Majority		2,677	1.35	
Turnout		197,414	96.04	
RSP hold		Swing		

=== 2011 ===
2011 West Bengal Legislative Assembly election: Kumargram (ST)
Party	Candidate	Votes	%	±%
RSP	Dasrath Tirkey	71,545	40.84	
AITC	Joachim Baxla	58,964	33.66	
JMM	Vinay Kumar Minj	18,784	10.72	
BJP	Hopna Soren	12,488	7.13	
IND	Hira Charan Narjinari	4,687	2.68	
IND	Sanjib Kumar Narjinari	2,960	1.69	
BSP	Eliash Narjinary	2,782	1.59	
IND	Khulu Saren	1,751	1.00	
RADP (Note: Rashtriya Deshaj Party)	Sushila Lakra	1,220	0.70	
Majority		12,581	7.18	
Turnout		175,181	85.22	
RSP hold		Swing		

=== 2006 ===
2006 West Bengal Legislative Assembly election: Kumargram (ST)
Party	Candidate	Votes	%	±%
RSP	Dasrath Tirkey	69,540	53.92	
AITC	Swapan Kujur	32,372	25.10	
INC	Clement Dungdung	27,065	20.99	
Majority		37,168	28.82	
Turnout		128,977		
RSP hold		Swing		

=== 2001 ===
2001 West Bengal Legislative Assembly election: Kumargram (ST)
Party	Candidate	Votes	%	±%
RSP	Dasrath Tirkey	60,966	54.98	
AITC	Paresh Chandra Das	27,782	25.05	
IND	Samarjit Narjinary	13,882	12.52	
BJP	Laudha Oraon	8,266	7.45	
Majority		33,184	29.93	
Turnout		110,967	75.95	
RSP hold		Swing		

=== 1996 ===
1996 West Bengal Legislative Assembly election: Kumargram (ST)
Party	Candidate	Votes	%	±%
RSP	Salib Toppo	59,032	52.21	
INC	Krishna Chik Baraik	41,580	36.77	
BJP	Laudha Oraon	10,337	9.14	
IND	Jarj Besra	959	0.85	
SWJP	Silbanus Lakra	654	0.58	
IND	Jharia Oraon	436	0.39	
IND	Ekka Samendra	76	0.07	
Majority		17,452	15.44	
Turnout		116,551	86.12	
RSP hold		Swing		

=== 1991 ===
1991 West Bengal Legislative Assembly election: Kumargram (ST)
Party	Candidate	Votes	%	±%
RSP	Salib Topo	52,282	52.21	
INC	Dudsai Topp	35,021	34.97	
BJP	Laudha Oraon	11,626	11.61	
IND	Samarendra Ekka	838	0.84	
AMB	Lawrence Lakra	367	0.37	
Majority		17,261	17.24	
Turnout		102,955	80.78	
RSP hold		Swing		

=== 1987 ===
1987 West Bengal Legislative Assembly election: Kumargram (ST)
Party	Candidate	Votes	%	±%
RSP	Subodh Barwa	48,081	58.21	
INC	Khagendra Nath Thakur	34,514	41.79	
Majority		13,567	16.42	
Turnout		85,325	77.29	
RSP hold		Swing		

=== 1982 ===
1982 West Bengal Legislative Assembly election: Kumargram (ST)
Party	Candidate	Votes	%	±%
RSP	Subodh Uraon	40,531	56.27	
INC	Dutsai Toppo	31,493	43.73	
Majority		9,038	12.54	
Turnout		75,170	80.61	
RSP hold		Swing		

=== 1977 ===
1977 West Bengal Legislative Assembly election: Kumargram (ST)
Party	Candidate	Votes	%	±%
RSP	John Arther Baxla	22,882	53.75	
INC	Konda Bhagat	15,543	36.51	
JP	Naranarayan Narjinary	3,807	8.94	
IND	Degendra Nath Das	337	0.79	
Majority		7,339	17.24	
Turnout		43,937	59.38	
Swing to RSP from INC		Swing		

=== 1972 ===
1972 West Bengal Legislative Assembly election: Kumargram
Party	Candidate	Votes	%	±%
INC	Debabrata Chatterjee	25,515	67.90	
CPI(M)	Nitai Chandra Das	12,061	32.10	
Majority		13,454	35.80	
Turnout		39,175	56.39	
INC hold		Swing		

=== 1971 ===
1971 West Bengal Legislative Assembly election: Kumargram
Party	Candidate	Votes	%	±%
INC	Pijush Kanti Mukherjee	16,619	43.94	
CPI(M)	Netai Chandra Das	7,984	21.11	
INC(O)	Anima Hmare	4,089	10.81	
RSP	Suresh Talukdar	4,083	10.80	
AIFB	Dhirendra Chandra Sarker	3,261	8.62	
IND	Benjamin Soren	994	2.63	
IND	Karji Lalit Mohan	793	2.10	
Majority		8,635	22.83	
Turnout		41,321	60.39	
INC hold		Swing		

=== 1969 ===
1969 West Bengal Legislative Assembly election: Kumargram
Party	Candidate	Votes	%	±%
INC	Pijish Kanti Mukherjee	19,197	48.19	
CPI(M)	Ranjit Das Gupta	13,760	34.55	
NDF	Michael Basumata	4,345	10.91	
IND	Sankhapati Roy	1,819	4.57	
PBI (Note: Proutist Bloc India)	Kalipada Chattopadhaya	711	1.78	
Majority		5,437	13.64	
Turnout		41,375	64.71	
INC hold		Swing		

=== 1967 ===
1967 West Bengal Legislative Assembly election: Kumargram
Party	Candidate	Votes	%	±%
INC	P. K. Mukherjee	16,093	41.30	
CPI(M)	R. Das Gupta	9,007	23.11	
IND	M. Basumata	8,927	22.91	
AIFB	M. Adhikari	2,981	7.65	
IND	J. N. Das	1,962	5.03	
Majority		7,086	18.19	
Turnout		43,201	67.30	
INC win (new seat)				
