= Alipurduar University =

Public university in West Bengal, India

- আলিপুরদুয়ার বিশ্ববিদ্যালয়
- Motto: Sa Vidya Ya Vimuktaye
- Motto in English: Honesty Wisdom Creativity
- Type: Public State University
- Established: 1957; 69 years ago (as Alipurduar College); 2020; 6 years ago (as Alipurduar University)
- Affiliations: UGC
- Chancellor: Governor of West Bengal
- Vice-Chancellor: Sarit K. Chaudhuri
- Location: Alipurduar, West Bengal, India
- Campus: Urban
- Mascot: Indian rhinoceros
- Website: alipurduaruniversity.ac.in

Alipurduar University is a public university in Alipurduar, West Bengal, India. It was established as an affiliating university by an act of the West Bengal government notified in 2018.

== History ==
In 1947, India gained independence but with a partition on the religious line. This partition led to the migration of a huge number of displaced people to the Dooars areas. Higher education for the children of these uprooted poverty-stricken people was of utmost necessity to change their fortune. In 1956 under the Refugee Rehabilitation and Development Programme of the Union Government, a local committee led by Late N. K. Mukherjee moved to the government for an establishment of undergraduate degree College at the Alipurduar town. G.B. Panth (union home minister of that time) also urged the Chief Minister of West Bengal Dr. Bidhan Chandra Roy for setting up a sponsored Degree College at Alipurduar. Finally, this institution was formally established in 1957 as an affiliating college of the University of Calcutta.When the University of North Bengal was established in 1962 at this part of the West Bengal, the affiliation of the college changed from the University of Calcutta to the University of North Bengal. In 2018, West Bengal state government announced the decision to upgrade the Alipurduar College as a full-fledged university. Finally, Alipurduar University was formally established by an Act of the West Bengal legislature. It became active with the appointment of the first vice-chancellor, Mahendra Nath Roy, in 2020.

== Academics ==
University offers PG and Phd courses in Bengali, English, Sanskrit, History, Political Science, Philosophy, Economics, Geography, Commerce, Physics, Chemistry, Mathematics, Botany, and Zoology.

The University College offers undergraduate courses in various subjects in Arts, Commerce and Sciences.

== See also ==
- Education in India
- Education in West Bengal
- Jadavpur University
- Jamia Millia Islamia
- Jawaharlal Nehru University
- List of universities in India
- University of Calcutta
- University of North Bengal
- Vidyasagar University
- List of institutions of higher education in West Bengal
