= Sourav Chakraborty (politician) =

Indian politician

Chairman of Siliguri Jalpaiguri Development Authority
- In office 25 August 2021 – 3 July 2025
- Preceded by: Bijoy Chandra Barman
- Succeeded by: Dilip Dugar

Member of West Bengal Legislative Assembly
- In office 2016–2021
- Preceded by: Debaprasad Roy
- Succeeded by: Suman Kanjilal
- Constituency: Alipurduar

Personal details
- Born: Alipurduar, West Bengal, India
- Party: All India Trinamool Congress
- Other political affiliations: Indian National Congress
- Education: University of North Bengal
- Occupation: Politician

Sourav Chakraborty is an Indian politician from West Bengal. He is a former Member of West Bengal Legislative Assembly from Alipurduar district. Currently, he served as Chairman of Siliguri Jalpaiguri Development Authority from 25 August 2021 to 3 July 2025.
