= James Kujur =

Indian politician

Minister-in-charge, Tribal Development Department, Government of West Bengal
- In office 28 August 2016 – 2 May 2021

Member of the West Bengal Legislative Assembly
- In office 2016–2021
- Succeeded by: Manoj Kumar Oraon
- Constituency: Kumargram

Personal details
- Born: 06.10.1956 PAHARGOOMIAH TEA ESTATE
- Party: All India Trinamool Congress
- Children: 2
- Occupation: Politician

James Kujur is an Indian Politician from the state of West Bengal. He is a member of the West Bengal Legislative Assembly.

== Constituency ==
He represents the Kumargram (Vidhan Sabha constituency). This constituency comprises eighteen anchals spread over two blocks, eleven anchals in Kumargram block and seven anchals in Alipurduar block two. This constituency has over 64% of tribals, spread over twelve Tea Gardens and forest areas. This constituency shares international borders with Bhutan and state border with Assam, because of its location this area had missed out on development as compared to the other parts of the state. The present government under the Chief Minister Mamata Banerjee and the Tribal Minister are ushering in holistic developments for the people and place of this region.

== Political party ==
He is from the All India Trinamool Congress (AITMC). Born to Pius and Agustina Kujur, fifth sibling among the seven at Girjaline Pahargoomiah Tea Estate on 6 October 1956, his initial education started at Katherdangi Garden School. In 1963, he was admitted to Goethals Memorial School Kurseong. He secured 1st division in Senior Cambridge, obtained Bachelor of Science degree from ST. Joseph's college, North Point, Darjeeling under North Bengal University.

He cleared West Bengal Public Service Examination in 1979 and joined government of West Bengal services as Inspector of Commercial Taxes. In December 1980, he was promoted to Commercial Tax Officer. In 1987, he opted out from Commercial Tax and cleared West Bengal Civil Service Examination. He joined the West Bengal Police Service as Deputy Superintendent of Police in 1987. On 3 March 2016, he took voluntary retirement from Government Service as Additional Superintendent of Police while posted at Jalpaiguri District. On 4 March 2016, he joined AITMC and was nominated as AITMC candidate from Kumargram Vidhan Sabha Constituency. On 27 May 2016, he became Cabinet Minister of West Bengal headed by Chief Minister Mamata Banerjee, to look after the Tribal Development Department Government of West Bengal.
