= A. H. Besterwitch =

Indian politician

A. H. Besterwitch was an Indian politician and trade unionist. He belonged to the Revolutionary Socialist Party. As of the 1960s and 1970s, he served as general secretary of the Dooars Cha Bagan Workers’ Union, a trade union of tea plantation labourers in northern West Bengal. He was elected to the West Bengal Legislative Assembly in the 1962, 1969, 1971, 1972 and 1977 elections. He led the RSP faction in the Legislative Assembly. Besterwitch died in 1979.
