= Laxuman Limbu =

Indian politician in West Bengal

Member of the West Bengal Legislative Assembly
- Incumbent
- Assumed office May 2026
- Preceded by: Jay Prakash Toppo
- Constituency: Madarihat

Personal details
- Party: Bharatiya Janata Party
- Profession: Politician

Laxuman Limbu is an Indian politician from West Bengal. He is a member of West Bengal Legislative Assembly, from Madarihat Assembly constituency.
