= Alipurduars Assembly constituency =

West Bengal Legislative Assembly constituency

Alipurduars
- Constituency No. 12 for the West Bengal Legislative Assembly
- Interactive Map Outlining Alipurduars Assembly Constituency

Constituency details
- Country: India
- Region: East India
- State: West Bengal
- District: Alipurduar
- Lok Sabha constituency: Alipurduars (ST)
- Established: 1951
- Total electors: 245,304
- Reservation: None

Member of Legislative Assembly
- 18th West Bengal Legislative Assembly
- Incumbent Paritosh Das
- Party: Bharatiya Janata Party
- Elected year: 2026

Most Successful parties from Alipurduars assembly
1. Revolutionary Socialist Party (9 times) (50.0%)
2. Indian National Congress (6 times) (33.3%)
3. Bharatiya Janata Party (2 times) (11.1%)
4. All India Trinamool Congress (1 time) (5.55%)

Alipurduars Assembly constituency is an assembly constituency in Alipurduar district in the Indian state of West Bengal.

== Overview ==
According to the orders of the Delimitation Commission, No. 12 Alipurduar Assembly constituency covers Alipurduar municipality, Alipurduar Railway Junction, and the Banchukamari, Chakowakheti, Mathura, Parorpar, Patlakhawa, Shalkumar I, Shalkumar II, Tapsikhata, Vivekananda II, Vivekananda I gram panchayats of Alipurduar I community development block, and Chaporerpar I, Chaporerpar II, and Tatpara II gram panchayats of Alipurduar II community development block.

Alipurduars Assembly constituency is part of No. 2 Alipurduars (Lok Sabha constituency) (ST).

== Members of the Legislative Assembly ==
Year	Name	Party
1951	Pijush Kanti Mukherjee	Indian National Congress
1957	Pijush Kanti Mukherjee	Indian National Congress
1962	Pijush Kanti Mukherjee	Indian National Congress
1967	Nani Bhattacharya	Revolutionary Socialist Party
1969	Nani Bhattacharya	Revolutionary Socialist Party
1971	Narayan Bhattacharya	Indian National Congress
1972	Narayan Bhattacharya	Indian National Congress
1977	Nani Bhattacharya	Revolutionary Socialist Party
1982	Nani Bhattacharya	Revolutionary Socialist Party
1987	Nani Bhattacharya	Revolutionary Socialist Party
1991	Nirmal Das	Revolutionary Socialist Party
1996	Nirmal Das	Revolutionary Socialist Party
2001	Nirmal Das	Revolutionary Socialist Party
2006	Nirmal Das	Revolutionary Socialist Party
2011	Debaprasad Roy	Indian National Congress
2016	Sourav Chakraborty	All India Trinamool Congress
2021	Suman Kanjilal	Bharatiya Janata Party
2026	Paritosh Das	Bharatiya Janata Party

== Election results ==
Vote share of Winning candidates
2026	61.62%
2021	48.19%
2016	44.09%
2011	46.02%
2006	49.85%
2001	52.28%
1996	52.42%
1991	49.09%
1987	57.84%
1982	61.18%
1977	62.95%
1972	55.61%
1971	41.84%
1969	51.28%
1967	53.45%
1962	49.86%
1957	49.23%
1952	66.71%

=== 2026 ===
2026 West Bengal Legislative Assembly election: Alipurduars
Party	Candidate	Votes	%	±%
BJP	Paritosh Das	143,242	61.62	▲13.43
AITC	Suman Kanjilal	72,822	31.33	▼9.67
CPI(M)	Shyamal Roy	7,301	3.14	New entry
INC	Mrinmoy Sarkar	2,644	1.14	▼5.89
IND	Abinash Das	954	0.41	New entry
IND	Bhupesh Das	923	0.40	New entry
AJUP	Abdul Latif Choudhury	647	0.28	New entry
IND	Abhijit Saha	531	0.23	New entry
SUCI(C)	Pijush Kanti Sarma	408	0.18	▼0.32
KPP(U)	Manik Barman	374	0.16	New entry
NOTA	Nota	2,620	1.13	▲0.24
Majority		70,420	30.29	▲23.10
Turnout		232,466	94.77	▲9.32
Registered electors		245,304		▼5.89
BJP hold		Swing	11.55	

=== 2021 ===
2021 West Bengal Legislative Assembly election: Alipurduars
Party	Candidate	Votes	%	±%
BJP	Suman Kanjilal	107,333	48.19	▲38.31
AITC	Sourav Chakraborty	91,326	41.00	▼3.09
INC	Debaprasad Roy	15,651	7.03	▼31.18
IND	Nikhil Chandra Raibir	2,351	1.06	
NOTA	None of the above	1,981	0.89	▼0.57
IND	Rinku Ghosh	1,393	0.63	
SUCI(C)	Pijush Kanti Sarma	1,111	0.50	▼0.63
IND	Ashim Roy	696	0.31	
IND	Kushal Kumar Roy	620	0.28	
IND	Abinash Das	270	0.12	
Majority		16,007	7.19	▲1.31
Turnout		222,732	85.45	▼0.71
BJP gain from AITC		Swing		

=== 2016 ===
2016 West Bengal Legislative Assembly election: Alipurduars
Party	Candidate	Votes	%	±%
AITC	Sourav Chakraborty	89,695	44.09	
INC	Biswa Ranjan Sarkar	77,737	38.21	▼7.81
BJP	Kushal Chatterjee	20,098	9.88	▲5.12
RSP	Nirmal Das	7,324	3.60	▼38.50
NOTA	None of the above	2,980	1.46	
SUCI(C)	Alokesh Das	2,308	1.13	▲0.26
AMB	Dalendra Nath Ray	1,341	0.66	
IND	Santosh Kumar Balo	989	0.49	
BSP	Gouri Roy	974	0.48	▼0.21
Majority		11,958	5.88	▲1.96
Turnout		203,446	86.16	▲0.12
AITC gain from INC		Swing		

=== 2011 ===
2011 West Bengal Legislative Assembly election: Alipurduars
Party	Candidate	Votes	%	±%
INC	Debaprasad Roy	79,605	46.02	▲22.74
RSP	Kshiti Goswami	72,822	42.10	▼7.75
BJP	Manik Chandra Saha	8,238	4.76	
IND	Santosh Kumar Balo	3,072	1.78	
JMM	Manohar Bhagat	1,864	1.08	
SUCI(C)	Abhijit Roy	1,508	0.87	
CPI(ML)L	Chanchal Kumar Das	1,438	0.83	
IND	Parimal Roy	1,396	0.81	
IND	Sanjit Das	1,301	0.75	
BSP	Mantu Barman	1,195	0.69	
RADP	Bishwanath Gop	530	0.31	
Majority		6,783	3.92	▼22.65
Turnout		172,969	86.04	
INC gain from RSP		Swing		

=== 2006 ===
2006 West Bengal Legislative Assembly election: Alipurduars
Party	Candidate	Votes	%	±%
RSP	Nirmal Das	71,566	49.85	▼2.43
INC	Sourav Chakroborty	33,399	23.28	
AITC	Debasish Goswami	30,151	20.98	▼12.01
IND	Suresh Ch. Roy	3,171	2.21	
IND	Abhijit Roy	2,547	1.77	
IND	Madan Das	1,479	1.03	
AMB	Dalendra Roy	1,443	1.00	
Majority		38,167	26.57	▲7.28
Turnout		144,880		
RSP hold		Swing		

=== 2001 ===
2001 West Bengal Legislative Assembly election: Alipurduars
Party	Candidate	Votes	%	±%
RSP	Nirmal Das	66,200	52.28	▼0.14
AITC	Prasanta Narayan Majumder	41,772	32.99	
BJP	Arabinda Roy	11,616	9.17	▲2.39
IND	Suresh Ch. Roy	4,618	3.65	
IND	Abhijit Roy	2,429	1.92	
Majority		24,428	19.29	▲6.66
Turnout		126,670	74.39	▼8.34
RSP hold		Swing		

=== 1996 ===
1996 West Bengal Legislative Assembly election: Alipurduars
Party	Candidate	Votes	%	±%
RSP	Nirmal Das	68,476	52.42	▲3.33
INC	Manindralal Rakshit	51,985	39.79	▲4.00
BJP	Ganesh Sikder	8,852	6.78	▼6.49
IND	Nikhil Chandra Raybir	523	0.40	
AMB	Probhat Adhikary	444	0.34	▲0.09
IND	Santu Karmakar	352	0.27	
Majority		16,491	12.63	▼0.67
Turnout		132,245	82.73	▲5.62
RSP hold		Swing		

=== 1991 ===
1991 West Bengal Legislative Assembly election: Alipurduars
Party	Candidate	Votes	%	±%
RSP	Nirmal Das	55,395	49.09	▼8.75
INC	Biaswa Ranjan Sarker	40,394	35.79	▼5.08
BJP	Shyampada Sanyal	14,974	13.27	
IND	Bikash Deb	708	0.63	
IND	Satyendra Prasad Roy	640	0.57	
CPI(M-L)	Pradip Das	466	0.41	
AMB	Dalendra Roy	278	0.25	
Majority		15,001	13.30	▼3.67
Turnout		115,293	77.11	▲1.65
RSP hold		Swing		

=== 1987 ===
1987 West Bengal Legislative Assembly election: Alipurduars
Party	Candidate	Votes	%	±%
RSP	Nani Bhattacharya	55,100	57.84	▼3.34
INC	Debabrata Chatterjee	38,932	40.87	▲2.68
IND	Jagannath Biswas	935	0.98	
IND	Probhat Adhikari	298	0.31	
Majority		16,168	16.97	▼6.02
Turnout		97,264	75.46	▼3.28
RSP hold		Swing		

=== 1982 ===
1982 West Bengal Legislative Assembly election: Alipurduars
Party	Candidate	Votes	%	±%
RSP	Nani Bhattacharya	50,025	61.18	▼1.77
INC	Pallab Ghosh	31,226	38.19	▲16.70
IND	Prabhar Adhikary	518	0.63	
Majority		18,799	22.99	▼18.47
Turnout		83,661	78.74	▲16.65
RSP hold		Swing		

=== 1977 ===
1977 West Bengal Legislative Assembly election: Alipurduars
Party	Candidate	Votes	%	±%
RSP	Nani Bhattacharya	35,635	62.95	▲20.46
INC	Narayan Bhattacharya	12,163	21.49	▼34.12
JP	Pijush Kanti Mukherjee	8,808	15.56	
Majority		23,472	41.46	▲28.34
Turnout		57,644	62.09	▲0.58
RSP gain from INC		Swing		

=== 1972 ===
1972 West Bengal Legislative Assembly election: Alipurduaras
Party	Candidate	Votes	%	±%
INC	Naryan Bhattacharya	27,386	55.61	▲13.77
RSP	Nani Bhattacharya	20,928	42.49	▲20.01
IND	Kalikrishna Bhattacharya	935	1.90	
Majority		6,458	13.12	▼5.77
Turnout		50,484	61.51	▼2.88
INC hold		Swing		

=== 1971 ===
1971 West Bengal Legislative Assembly election: Alipurduars
Party	Candidate	Votes	%	±%
INC	Narayan Bhattacharya	20,455	41.84	▼5.51
CPI(M)	Ranjit Das Gupta	11,219	22.95	
RSP	Nani Bhattacharya	10,990	22.48	▼28.80
IND	Moktan Jyoti Prakash	3,801	7.77	
SSP	Sachindra Nath Ganguly	929	1.90	
BAC	Kahai Baliav Goswami	805	1.65	
IND	Ram Chandra Ray Sarkar	693	1.42	
Majority		9,236	18.89	▲14.96
Turnout		51,387	64.39	▼1.16
INC gain from RSP		Swing		

=== 1969 ===
1969 West Bengal Legislative Assembly election: Alipurduars
Party	Candidate	Votes	%	±%
RSP	Nani Bhattacharya	24,784	51.28	
INC	Dhirendra Kumar Bhowmik	22,883	47.35	▲4.63
PBI	Suresh Chandra Das	663	1.37	
Majority		1,901	3.93	▼6.80
Turnout		49,787	65.55	▼3.29
RSP gain from Independent		Swing		

=== 1967 ===
1967 West Bengal Legislative Assembly election: Alipore Duars
Party	Candidate	Votes	%	±%
IND	Nani Bhattacharya	26,186	53.45	
INC	B. K. Bhowmick	20,931	42.72	▼7.14
BAC	K. B. Goswami	1,874	3.83	
Majority		5,255	10.73	▲4.21
Turnout		51,289	68.84	▲23.51
Independent gain from INC		Swing		

=== 1962 ===
1962 West Bengal Legislative Assembly election: Alipur Duars
Party	Candidate	Votes	%	±%
INC	Pijush Kanti Mukherjee	16,533	49.86	▲0.63
IND	Nilkantha Roy	14,370	43.34	
IND	Konda Bhagat	1,580	4.77	
PSP	Satish Chandra Roy	674	2.03	
Majority		2,163	6.52	▼8.56
Turnout		35,819	45.33	▼4.61
INC hold		Swing		

=== 1957 ===
1957 West Bengal Legislative Assembly election: Alipur Duars
Party	Candidate	Votes	%	±%
INC	Pijush Kanti Mukherjee	16,207	49.23	▼17.48
IND	Nani Bhattacharya	11,243	34.15	
IND	Nilkantha Roy	4,433	13.47	
IND	Chittaranjan Bhattacharya	1,036	3.15	
Majority		4,964	15.08	▼24.75
Turnout		32,919	49.94	▲16.32
INC hold		Swing		

=== 1952 ===
1952 West Bengal Legislative Assembly election: Alipurduars
Party	Candidate	Votes	%	±%
INC	Pijush Kanti Mukherjee	17,793	66.71	
RSP	Nani Bhattacharya	7,169	26.88	
FB(RG)	Amal Kumar Bhattacharya	1,711	6.41	
INC	Dhirandra Bramha Mandal	0	0.00	
Majority		10,624	39.83	
Turnout		26,673	33.62	
INC win (new seat)				
