= Anil Adhikari (politician) =

Indian politician (c.1949–2019)

West Bengal Legislative Assembly
- In office 2011 – 31 October 2019
- Preceded by: Jogesh Chandra Barman
- Constituency: Falakata

Personal details
- Born: c. 1949
- Died: 31 October 2019 (aged 70)
- Party: All India Trinamool Congress

Anil Adhikari (c. 1949 – 31 October 2019) was an Indian politician belonging to All India Trinamool Congress. He was elected as a member of the West Bengal Legislative Assembly from Falakata in 2011 and 2016. He died of cancer on 31 October 2019 at the age of 70.
