= Buxa =

- Census Town
- Interactive map of Buxa
- Country: India
- State: West Bengal
- District: Alipurduar

Languages
  - Official: Bengali
  - Additional official: Nepali
- Time zone: UTC+5:30 (IST)
- PIN: 735204
- Telephone code: 03561
- Vehicle registration: WB-70

Buxa is a village in the Alipurduar district of West Bengal within Buxa Tiger Reserve. It is located 30 kilometres (19 mi) from Alipurduar, the nearest town. It is known for the Buxa Fort. It is situated in the dooars in north bengal and it is the critical corridor with assam and Bhutan. Buxa is the wettest place of West Bengal, receiving the highest amount of rainfall (annual average rainfall: 527 cm), as per 2000.
