= Barobisha =

- Village
- Location in West Bengal, India
- Coordinates: 26.4679°N 89.8048°E
- Country: India
- State: West Bengal
- District: Alipurduar

Government
  - Body: Gram panchayat

Languages
  - Official: Bengali, English
- Time zone: UTC+5:30 (IST)
- PIN: 736207
- Telephone code: 03564
- Vehicle registration: WB
- Nearest city: Alipurduar
- Lok Sabha constituency: Alipurduar
- Civic agency: Gram Panchayat
- Climate: Tropical humid (Köppen)

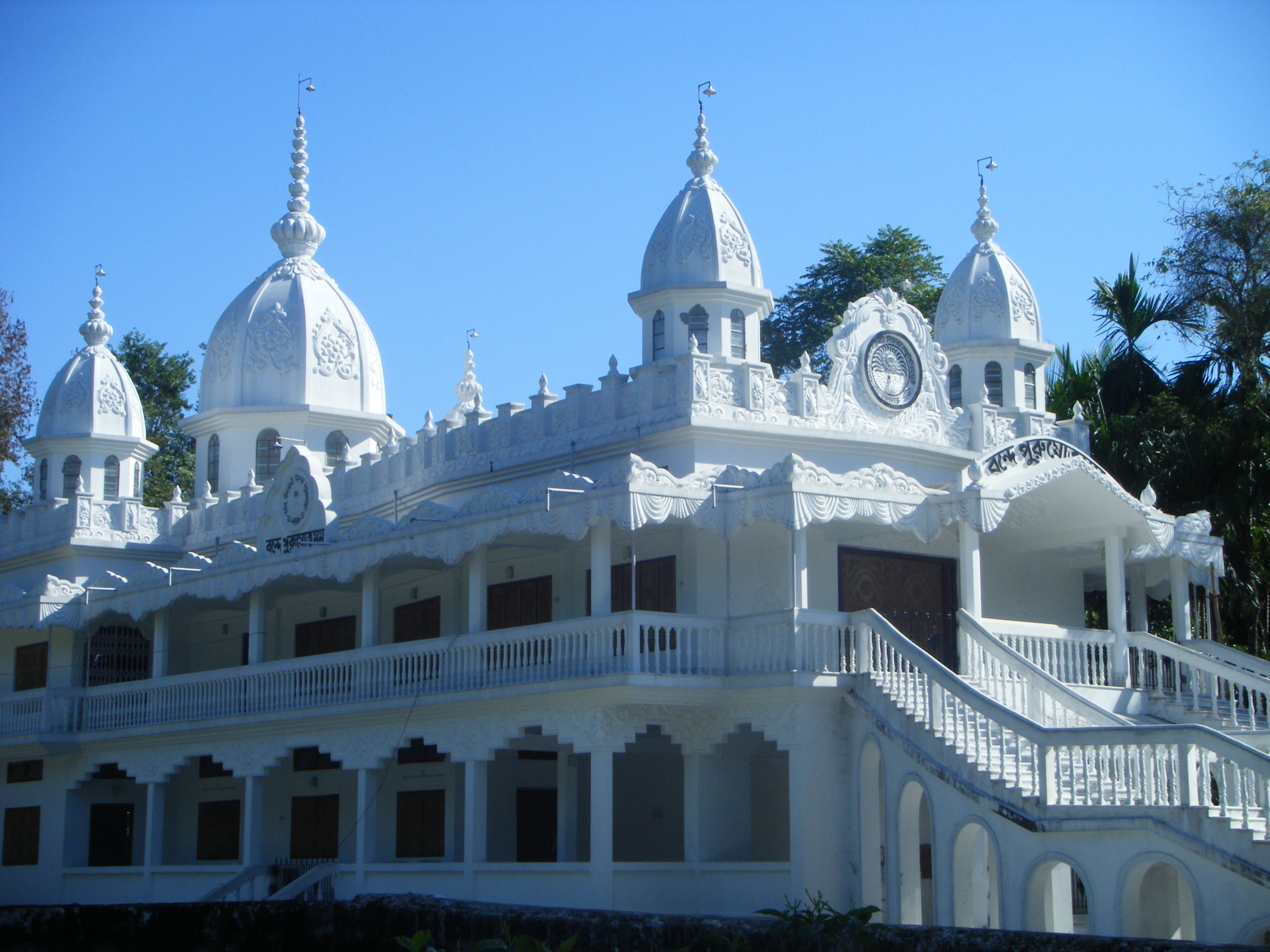
Barobisha satsangha mandir বারবিশা সৎসঙ্গ মন্দির in the name of Anukul Thakur

Barobisha (also known as Barovisha or Barabisa) is a village located on the National Highway 31C, towards Assam, in the Alipurduar district of West Bengal.It is 8 km away from the Bengal-Assam border. Barobisha comes under the Kumargram community development block. The gram panchayats of Kumargram block/ panchayat samiti are: Chengmari, Kamakhyaguri I, Kamakhyaguri II, Khoardanga I, Khoardanga II, Kumargram, Newland, Kumargram Sankosh, Rydak, Turturi Khanda, Valka Barovisha I and Valka Barovisha II.

Barobisha is the entrance to exotic locations like Newlands Tea Garden, Rasikbil migratory bird sanctuary West Bengal, Kalikhola, Geylegphug, and Phuntsholing Bhutan. The place is famous for its Marathon football league and Kali-mela (the fair on the eve of Goddess Kali worship). To its north lies Bhutan hills, south lies Bangladesh and east lies Assam state. Raidak and Sankosh (Wang Chhu and Tsang Chu in Bhutan) are two rivers on the west and east sides of the place. Currently the major portion of Barobisha is getting a massive facelift as it has been demolished on 7 December 2010 due to reconstruction for the National Highway expansion project, which was almost complete by July 2014.

Nearest Town Kamakhyaguri

== Location ==
- Latitude: 26.4679 North
- Longitude: 89.8048 East
- Pin Code: 736207
- Outpost: Barobisha
- District: Alipurduar
- Nearest City: Alipurduar
- State: West Bengal (North)
- Subtropical plains

== Major localities ==
Barobisha bazar and Montala মনতলা, Howlipotty, Christian math, NWGEL Church and Laskar Para, Radhanagar and Laal School, JNV (Jawahar Navodaya Vidyalaya) CBSE School, Chakchaka চকচকা & New town, Satsang mandir সৎসঙ্গ মন্দির & Dakshin rampur, Bawt-tola বটতলা and Shalbagan শালবাগান, commercial sales tax office at Assam gate & Shantibon. The nearest railway station to the South is Jorai and nearest Hospital to the North is Laal School (towards Bhutan Hills).

The nearest railway station Kamakhyaguri Railway Station and nearest Hospital Kamakhyaguri Rural Hospital

== Occupation ==
Most of the people are farmers and the next generations rely on businesses like timber, construction works, fishing, vegetable, and retail clothing. Assam-Bengal Commercial/Sales Tax office used to provide a large number of jobs. But post GST regime, Jorai and it's neighbour Barobisha have witnessed massive unemployment due to the unification in taxes and abolishing of the State sales Tax gate, which would otherwise serve many people a source of income. Computer learning centers, Kindergarten & Montessori schools, state government jobs and agriculture provide other job opportunities.

== Cultural activities ==
Cultural activities started with the emergence of Natyam নাট্যম-the drama club and "Udaisree Sangha" in the 1980s and was further geared up by the "Pratyusha প্রত্যুষা Cultural Unit" with their annual drama festival. After a long gap, অন্তরীক্ষ নাট্য একাদেমি Antarikshya Natya Academy has become the torch bearer. Geetanjali Sangeet Mahavidyalaya, Sur-O-Chhondo Kalakendra are the renowned Music Institutes since a long time. Apart from that, Dishari, Bawt-tola (or Battala) বটতলা, ছন্নছাড়া, Swadhin-Bharat, New-town, Man-tola (মনতলা), Friends Union Club and Netaji Sangha (নেতাজী সংঘ)have also played a considerable role in cultural activities. The local cable news network Ex TV Bangla) broadcasts a Sunday news bulletin. Local newspapers like Simanto Barta and Volka Samachar, edited by eminent literary persona the late Shantonu lahiri (Volka Samachar presently being published by his widow, M/s Dipali Bagchi) are reliable sources of information.

== Sports initiatives ==
Barobisha has a strong and inspiring sports heritage, football in particular. The marathon football league held every year on the eve of Independence day which witnesses a massive upsurge of spectators around the district or its neighbourhood area. However, with the advent of cricket in the 1990s named Barobisha Cricket XI, the craze for football has been reduced considerably.

== External sources ==
- সংবাদ প্রতিদিন
- Bird's Eye view:
- Barobisha Facebook page
