= Laskarpara =

- Census Town
- Location in West Bengal, India Laskarpara (India)
- Coordinates: 26.4836°N 89.8155°E
- Country: India
- State: West Bengal
- District: Alipurduar

Area
  - Total: 3.624 km^{2} (1.399 sq mi)

Population (2011)
  - Total: 7,137
  - Density: 1,969/km^{2} (5,101/sq mi)
- Time zone: UTC+5:30 (IST)
- PIN: 736207
- Telephone/STD code: 03661
- Vehicle registration: WB
- Lok Sabha constituency: Alipurduars
- Vidhan Sabha constituency: Kumargram
- Website: alipurduar.gov.in

Laskarpara is a census town in the Kumargram CD block in the Alipurduar subdivision of the Alipurduar district in the state of West Bengal, India.

== Geography ==
Places and tea estates in the eastern portion of Alipurdar subdivision (including Kalchini, Kumargram and Alipuduar II CD blocks) in Alipurduar district
CT: census town, R: rural/ urban centre, N: neighbourhood, A: Air Force Station, NP: national park/ wildlife sanctuary, TE: tea estate, H: historical site
Abbreviations used in names – TG for Tea Garden (town/village), TE for Tea Estate
Owing to space constraints in the small map, the actual locations in a larger map may vary slightly

=== Location ===
Laskarpara is located at 26.4836°N 89.8155°E.

=== Area overview ===
Alipurduar district is covered by two maps. It extends to the eastern end of the Dooars in West Bengal. The area is largely-forested, undulating country with numerous rivers flowing down from the outer ranges of the Himalayas in Bhutan. It is a predominantly rural area with 79.38% of the population living in the rural areas. The district has one municipal town and 20 census towns so 20.62% of the population lives in the urban areas. The scheduled castes and scheduled tribes collectively form more than half the population in all six community development blocks in the district. There is a high concentration of tribal people (scheduled tribes) in the three northern blocks of the district.

Note: The map alongside presents some of the notable locations in the subdivision. All places marked in the map are linked in the larger full screen map.

== Demographics ==
As per the 2011 Census of India, Laskarpara had a total population of 7,137. There were 3,706 (52%) males and 3,431 (48%) females. There were 752 persons in the age range of 0 to six years. The total number of literate people in Laskarpara was 5,544 (86.83% of the population is over six years).

== Infrastructure ==
According to the District Census Handbook 2011, Jalpaiguri, Laskarpara covered an area of 3.624 square kilometres (1.399 sq mi). In regard to civic amenities: there were 6 kilometres (3.7 mi) of road; the protected water supply was overhead tank; and tap water was from a treated source – with an uncovered well also used for storage. It had 700 domestic electric connections. Among the medical facilities, the nearest dispensary/ health centre was 10 kilometres (6.2 mi) away. There were four medicine shops in the town. Among educational facilities, it had five primary schools and a middle school. The nearest secondary school is 2 kilometres (1.2 mi) away, in Barobisha. The closest senior secondary school, in Chakchaka, is a similar distance. Laskarpara had one cinema.

== Education ==
Saheed Kshudiram College was established at Kamakhyaguri in 1996. Affiliated with the University of North Bengal, it offers courses in arts and science.

== Healthcare ==
With 30 beds, Kamakhyaguri Rural Hospital is the major government medical facility in the Kumargram CD block.
