= Dakshin Rampur =

- Census Town
- Location in West Bengal, India Dakshin Rampur (India)
- Coordinates: 26.4672°N 89.8155°E
- Country: India
- State: West Bengal
- District: Coochbehar

Area
  - Total: 3.4884 km^{2} (1.3469 sq mi)

Population (2011)
  - Total: 6,932
  - Density: 1,987/km^{2} (5,147/sq mi)
- Time zone: UTC+5:30 (IST)
- PIN: 736207
- Telephone/STD code: 03661
- Vehicle registration: WB
- Lok Sabha constituency: Alipurduars
- Vidhan Sabha constituency: Kumargram
- Website: alipurduar.gov.in

Dakshin Rampur is a census town in the Kumargram CD block in the Alipurduar subdivision of the Alipurduar district in the state of West Bengal, India.

== Geography ==
Places and tea estates in the eastern portion of Alipurdar subdivision (including Kalchini, Kumargram and Alipuduar II CD blocks) in Alipurduar district
CT: census town, R: rural/ urban centre, N: neighbourhood, A: Air Force Station, NP: national park/ wildlife sanctuary, TE: tea estate, H: historical site
Abbreviations used in names – TG for Tea Garden (town/village), TE for Tea Estate
Owing to space constraints in the small map, the actual locations in a larger map may vary slightly

=== Location ===
Dakshin Rampur is located at 26.4672°N 89.8155°E.

=== Area overview ===
Alipurduar district is covered by two maps. It is an extensive area in the eastern end of the Dooars in West Bengal. It is undulating country, largely forested, with numerous rivers flowing down from the outer ranges of the Himalayas in Bhutan. It is a predominantly rural area with 79.38% of the population living in the rural areas. The district has 1 municipal town and 20 census towns and that means that 20.62% of the population lives in the urban areas. The scheduled castes and scheduled tribes, taken together, form more than half the population in all the six community development blocks in the district. There is a high concentration of tribal people (scheduled tribes) in the three northern blocks of the district.

Note: The map alongside presents some of the notable locations in the subdivision. All places marked in the map are linked in the larger full screen map.

== Demographics ==
As per the 2011 Census of India, Dakshin Rampur had a total population of 6,932. There were 3,298 (52%) males and 3,094 (48%) females. There were 627 persons in the age range of 0 to 6 years. The total number of literate people in Dakshin Rampur was 5,124 (88.88% of the population over 6 years).

== Infrastructure ==
According to the District Census Handbook 2011, Jalpaiguri, Dakhin Rampur covered an area of 3.4884 km^{2}. Among the civic amenities, the protected water supply involved overhead tank, tap water from treated source and uncovered well. It had 948 domestic electric connections. Among the medical facilities the nearest maternity/ child welfare centre was 10 km away, the nearest hospital 35 km away. Among the educational facilities it had 3 primary schools, 1 middle school, 1 secondary school,1 senior secondary school, the nearest general degree college at Uttar Kamakhyaguri 8 km away.

== Education ==
Saheed Kshudiram College was established at Kamakhyaguri in 1996. Affiliated with the University of North Bengal, it offers courses in arts and science.

== Healthcare ==
Kamakhyaguri Rural Hospital, with 30 beds at Kamakhyaguri, is the major government medical facility in the Kumargram CD block.
