= Buxa Road railway station =

Railway station in Alipurduar district, India

Buxa Road is the name of the railway station in Northeast Frontier Railway Zone of Indian Railways in Alipurduar district, West Bengal. It is located at the easternmost end of Dooars valley near the Buxa Tiger Reserve, the second largest tiger reserve in West Bengal. In 2022, a rail alert was created to prevent accidents while elephants cross the track in this region.
