= Rajabhatkhawa =

- Town
- Location in West Bengal, India Rajabhatkhawa (India)
- Coordinates: 26.62°N 89.53°E
- Country: India
- State: West Bengal
- District: Alipurduar
- Elevation: 221 m (725 ft)

Languages
  - Official: Bengali, English, Nepali
- Time zone: UTC+5:30 (IST)
- Vehicle registration: WB
- Website: wb.gov.in

Rajabhatkhawa (Bengali pronunciation: [ɾad͡ʒabʱatkʰao̯a]), is a small town situated just outside the Buxa Tiger Reserve in the Kalchini CD block in the Alipurduar subdivision of the Alipurduar district in West Bengal, India. It is known for its natural environment, and is surrounded by forest. Permits for the entry to the Buxa Tiger Reserve are issued here.

== Etymology ==
The name of the place literally means "(the place) where the king had a meal". The folklore is that the kings of the princely state Koch Bihar used to come here for having picnic in the forests.

== Geography ==
Places and tea estates in the eastern portion of Alipurdar subdivision (including Kalchini, Kumargram and Alipuduar II CD blocks) in Alipurduar district
CT: census town, R: rural/ urban centre, N: neighbourhood, A: Air Force Station, NP: national park/ wildlife sanctuary, TE: tea estate, H: historical site
Abbreviations used in names – TG for Tea Garden (town/village), TE for Tea Estate
Owing to space constraints in the small map, the actual locations in a larger map may vary slightly

=== Location ===
Rajabhatkhawa is located at 26.62°N 89.53°E. It has an average elevation of 221 m (725 ft).

=== Area overview ===
Alipurduar district is covered by two maps. It is an extensive area in the eastern end of the Dooars in West Bengal. It is undulating country, largely forested, with numerous rivers flowing down from the outer ranges of the Himalayas in Bhutan. It is a predominantly rural area with 79.38% of the population living in the rural areas. The district has 1 municipal town and 20 census towns and that means that 20.62% of the population lives in the urban areas. The scheduled castes and scheduled tribes, taken together, form more than half the population in all the six community development blocks in the district. There is a high concentration of tribal people (scheduled tribes) in the three northern blocks of the district.

Note: The map alongside presents some of the notable locations in the subdivision. All places marked in the map are linked in the larger full screen map.

== Transport ==
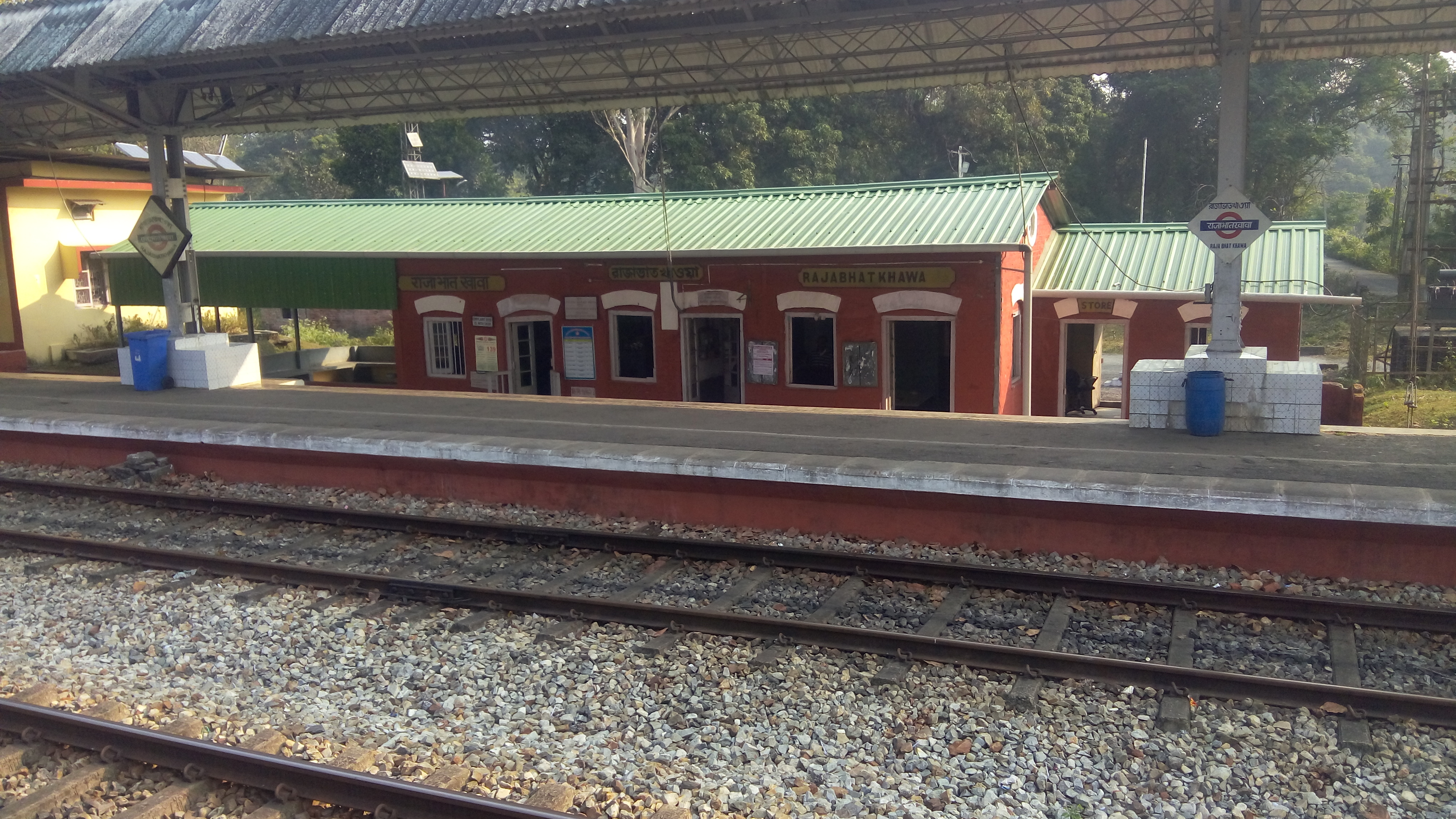
The railway station at Rajabhatkhawa.

National Highway 31C passes through Rajabhat Khawa. Rajabhatkhawa also has a railway station Rajabhatkhawa Railway Station which is situated on the New Jalpaiguri-Alipurduar-Samuktala Road Line.

Rajabhatkhawa-Jainti line is a new project sanctioned in 2012-13.
