= Bhutanghat =

- Census Town
- Country: India
- State: West Bengal
- District: Alipurduar

Languages
  - Official: Bengali
- Time zone: UTC+5:30 (IST)
- PIN: 735204
- Telephone code: 03561
- Vehicle registration: WB-70

Bhutanghat is a village in the Alipurduar district of West Bengal. It is about 45 kilometres (28 mi) away from Alipurduar and is a tourist destination.
