= Raimatang =

- Village
- Location in West Bengal, India Raimatang (India)
- Coordinates: 26.766778°N 89.503667°E
- Country: India
- State: West Bengal
- District: Alipurduar
- Time zone: UTC+5:30 (IST)
- Telephone/STD code: 03564
- Vehicle registration: WB
- Lok Sabha constituency: Alipurduars
- Vidhan Sabha constituency: Kalchini
- Website: alipurduar.gov.in

Raimatang is a village in the Kalchini CD block in the Alipurduar subdivision of the Alipurduar district in West Bengal, India. It is about 45 kilometres (28 mi) away from Alipurduar and is a tourist destination. It is part of Buxa Tiger Reserve.It is one of the important picnic spots in Alipurduar district.

== Geography ==
Places and tea estates in the eastern portion of Alipurdar subdivision (including Kalchini, Kumargram and Alipuduar II CD blocks) in Alipurduar district
CT: census town, R: rural/ urban centre, N: neighbourhood, A: Air Force Station, NP: national park/ wildlife sanctuary, TE: tea estate, H: historical site
Abbreviations used in names – TG for Tea Garden (town/village), TE for Tea Estate
Owing to space constraints in the small map, the actual locations in a larger map may vary slightly

=== Location ===
Raimatang is located at 26.766778°N 89.503667°E.

=== Area overview ===
Alipurduar district is covered by two maps. It is an extensive area in the eastern end of the Dooars in West Bengal. It is undulating country, largely forested, with numerous rivers flowing down from the outer ranges of the Himalayas in Bhutan. It is a predominantly rural area with 79.38% of the population living in the rural areas. The district has 1 municipal town and 20 census towns and that means that 20.62% of the population lives in the urban areas. The scheduled castes and scheduled tribes, taken together, form more than half the population in all the six community development blocks in the district. There is a high concentration of tribal people (scheduled tribes) in the three northern blocks of the district.

Note: The map alongside presents some of the notable locations in the subdivision. All places marked in the map are linked in the larger full screen map.

== Tourism ==
Sited along a meandering river at the edge of the Buxa Tiger Reserve, close to the Bhutan border, Raimatang is surrounded by hills and tea gardens, the sight of which has lured tourists to this small forest village. One can take long or short treks and enjoy the scenic beauty, or spend time in the morning observing wildlife from the watch tower. Tourist amenities available are basic in nature. One has to cross a river over its bed to reach the village.
