= Nimati =

Village in West Bengal, India

- Country: India
- State: West Bengal
- District: Alipurduar

Languages
  - Official: Bengali
- Time zone: UTC+5:30 (IST)

Nimati is a village in the Alipurduar district of West Bengal. It is about 17 kilometres (11 mi) away from Alipurduar and is a tourist destination. It is part of Buxa Tiger Reserve.
