= SXX =

SXX may refer to:

- SXX, the IATA code for São Félix do Xingu Airport, Brazil
- SXX, the Indian Railways station code for Salbari railway station, West Bengal, India
