= Nilpara =

Village in West Bengal, India

- Country: India
- State: West Bengal
- District: Alipurduar

Languages
  - Official: Bengali
- Time zone: UTC+5:30 (IST)

Nilpara is a village in the Alipurduar district of West Bengal, India. It is about 27 kilometres (17 mi) away from Alipurduar and is a tourist destination.
