= Buxa Fort =

Mountain fort in Alipurduar, West Bengal, India

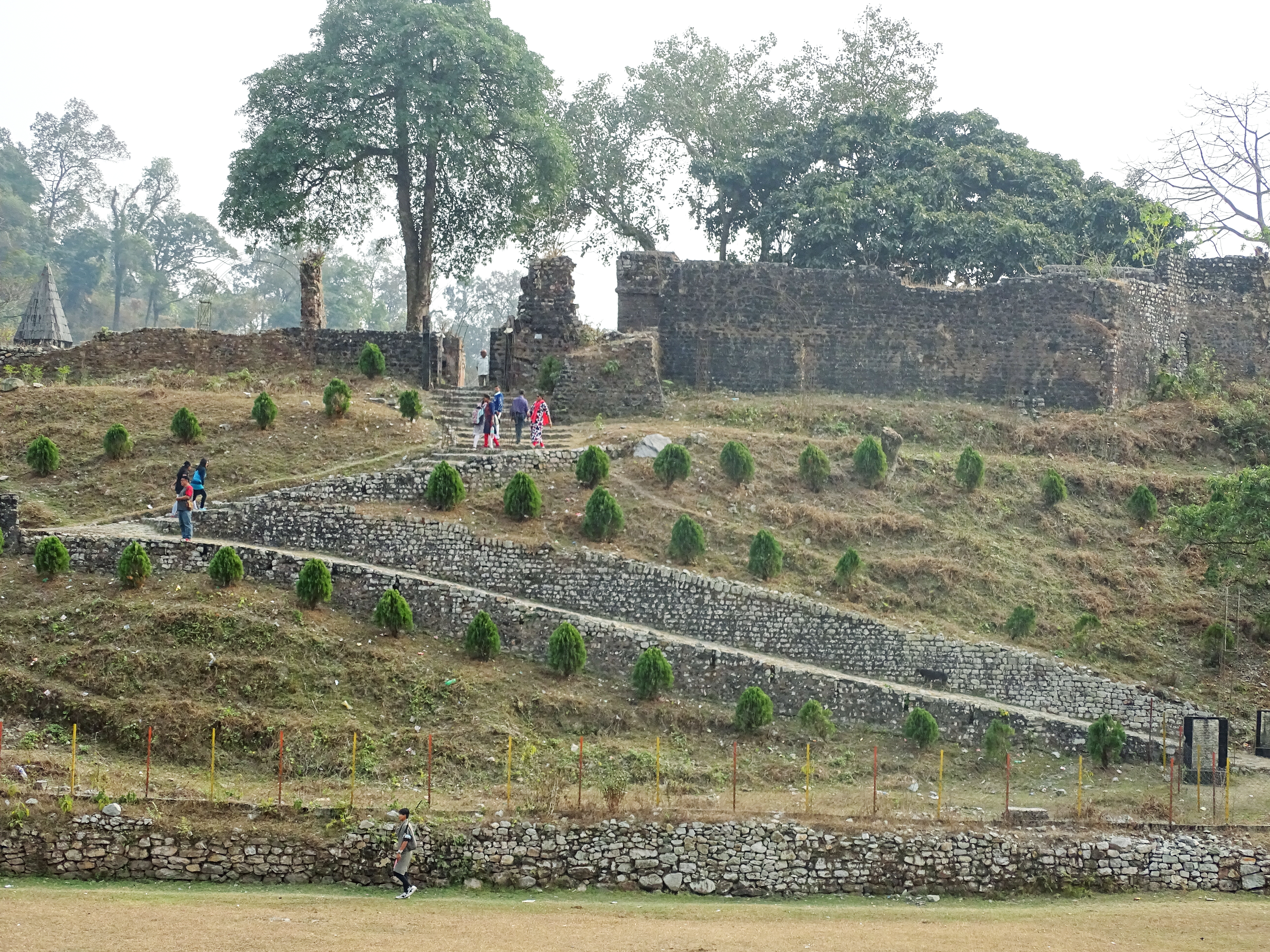
- Buxa Fort
- Interactive map of Buxa Fort
- Type: Fort
- Location: Buxa Tiger Reserve, Alipurduar district, India
- Part of: West Bengal

History
- Built by: Bhutan

Site notes
- Material: Bricks, Granite and Lime mortar
- Condition: Ruins
- Management: Government of West Bengal

Buxa Fort is located at an altitude of 867 metres (2,844 ft) in the Buxa Tiger Reserve, in the Kalchini CD block in the Alipurduar subdivision of the Alipurduar district in West Bengal, India. It is 30 kilometres (19 mi) from Alipurduar, the nearest town. The King of Bhutan used the fort to protect territory connecting Tibet with India, via Bhutan. During the unrest in the annexation of Tibet by the People's Republic of China, hundreds of displaced persons used the abandoned fort as a place of refuge.

== History ==
The fort was built by Kingdom of Bhutan as a military outpost and a gateway to Bhutan. Before the occupation of the fort by the British, it was a point of contention between the Bhutan and the erstwhile princely state of Cooch Behar.

=== British occupation ===
The British, invited by the Cooch King, intervened and captured the fort. It was later formally handed over to the British on November 11, 1865 as part of the Treaty of Sinchula. The British reconstructed the fort from a bamboo wood structure to a stone structure. The fort was later used as a high-security prison and detention camp in the 1930s; Subhamay Dutta's research shows that Buxa functioned as a detention camp under the Bengal Criminal Law Amendment Act of 1930 during 1930–1937, and later operated as a special jail from 1942 to 1947, and again from 1949 to 1951. Dutta’s research further establishes that Subhas Chandra Bose was not detained at Buxa Fort. He reconceptualizes Buxa not merely as a ‘fort,’ but as a detention camp and an instrument of colonial control. https://doi.org/10.59815/bhs.vol2706 it was the most notorious and unreachable prison in India after the Cellular Jail in Andaman. Nationalist revolutionaries belonging to the Anushilan Samiti and Yugantar groups, such as Krishnapada Chakraborty, were imprisoned there in the 1930s. Poet Rabindranath Tagore wrote a poem to lift the morale of the prisoners kept in this forest prison.Forward Bloc leader and ex-law minister of West Bengal, Amar Prasad Chakraborty, was also imprisoned at Buxa Fort in 1943, as were some communist revolutionaries and intellectuals like Nirad Chakraborty, Shibshankar Mitra and Satish Pakrashi. The poet Subhash Mukhopadhyay was also imprisoned there in the 1950s. He gave a vivid description of this jail in one of his stories, “Prison in the Clouds” (Bengali: মেঘের গায়ে জেলখানা, romanized: Mēghēra gāẏē jēlakhānā) in his Bengali book (Bengali: আমার বাংলা, romanized: Āmāra bānlā).

=== Tibetan refugee crisis ===
In March 1959, Chinese troops tasked with quelling the Tibetan uprising moved aggressively against the Drepung Monastery; only a few hundred of over 10,000 monks escaped to India via Bhutan. These Drepung monks, and other refugee monks and nuns representing diverse Tibetan orders, first set up a monastic study center and refugee camp known as Buxa Chogar, on the grounds of the jungle-bound former prison camp.

In 1966, the Indian Ministry of External Affairs was alerted to the conditions of the Buxa refugee camps, and it became apparent that the Tibetan refugees would have to be relocated to a more hospitable place. Initially reluctant, a message from the Dalai Lama, urging them to think of the future and to strive for sufficiency, and the option of settling near other Tibetan refugees, convinced the monks to move. In 1971, the monks left Buxa Fort for new locations at Bylakuppe and Mundgod in the state of Karnataka.

== Geography ==
Places and tea estates in the eastern portion of Alipurdar subdivision (including Kalchini, Kumargram and Alipuduar II CD blocks) in Alipurduar district
CT: census town, R: rural/ urban centre, N: neighbourhood, A: Air Force Station, NP: national park/ wildlife sanctuary, TE: tea estate, H: historical site
Abbreviations used in names – TG for Tea Garden (town/village), TE for Tea Estate
Owing to space constraints in the small map, the actual locations in a larger map may vary slightly

=== Location ===
Buxa Fort is located at 26°45′17.86″N 89°34′49.04″E.

=== Area overview ===
Alipurduar district is an extensive area in the eastern end of the Dooars in West Bengal. It is undulating country, largely forested, with numerous rivers flowing down from the outer ranges of the Himalayas in Bhutan. It is a predominantly rural area, with 79.38% of the population living in rural areas. The district has one municipal town and 20 census towns; 20.62% of the population lives in urban areas. The scheduled castes and scheduled tribes, taken together, form more than half the population in all the six community development blocks in the district. There is a high concentration of tribal people (scheduled tribes) in the three northern blocks of the district.

Note: The map alongside presents some of the notable locations in the subdivision. All places marked in the map are linked in the larger full screen map.

== Trekking ==
The following routes are popular among tourists and nature lovers –

- Santalabari to Buxa Fort 5 kilometres (3.1 mi)
- Buxa Fort to Rovers point 3 kilometres (1.9 mi)
- Santalabari to Roopang valley 14 kilometres (8.7 mi)
- Buxa Fort to Lepchakha 5 kilometres (3.1 mi)
- Buxa Fort to Chunabhati 4 kilometres (2.5 mi)

== Buxa Fort picture gallery ==
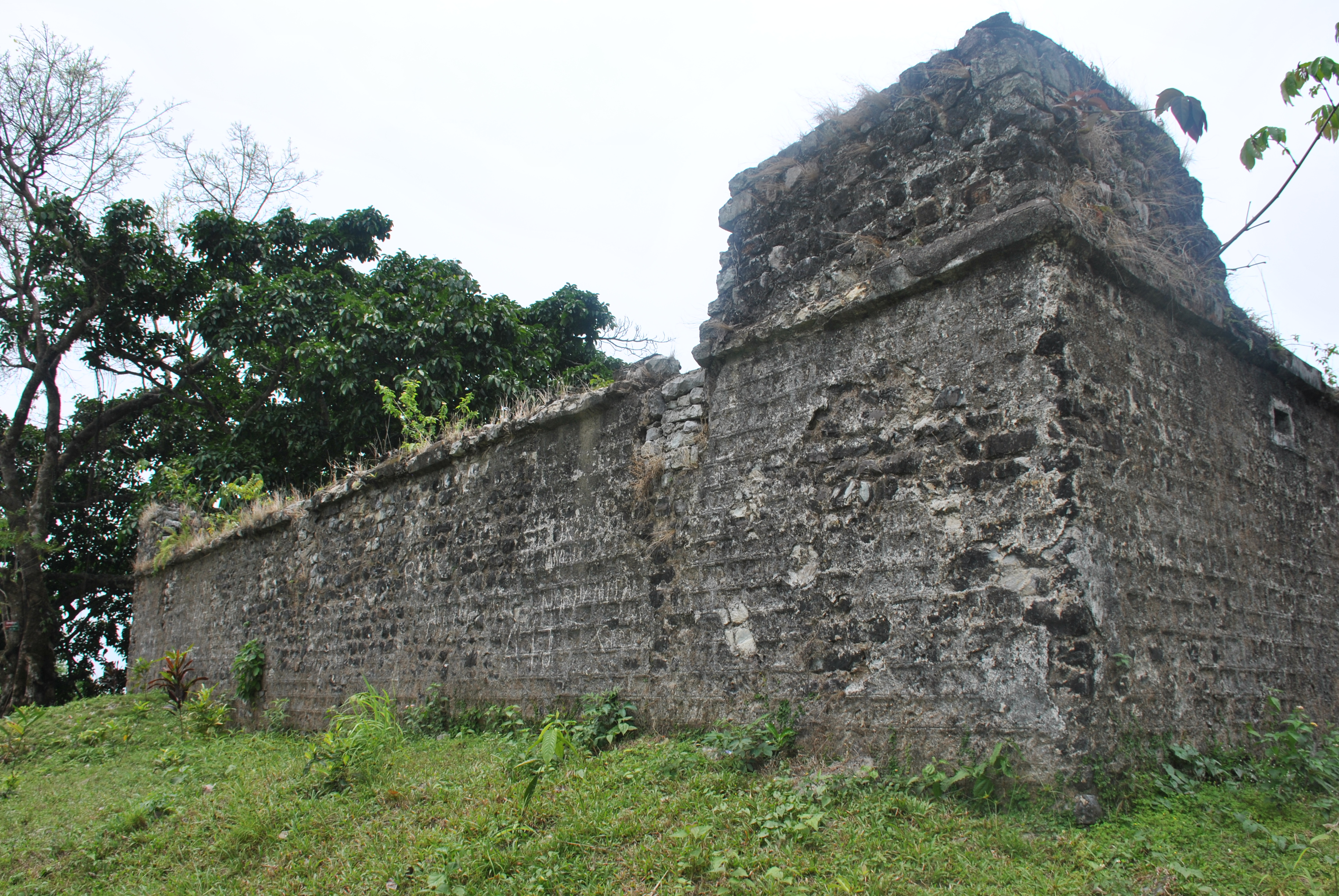
Buxa Fort

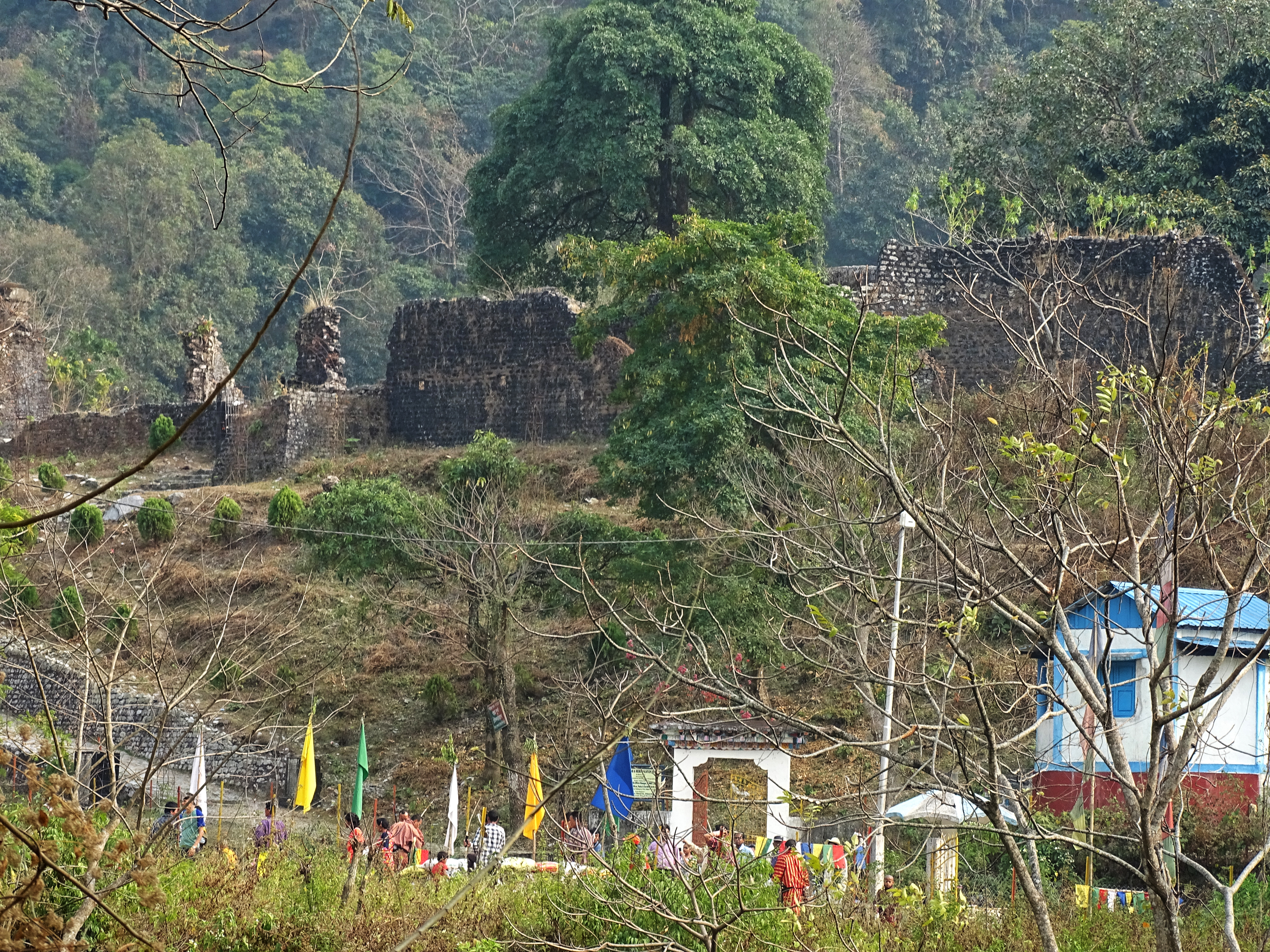
Buxa Fort

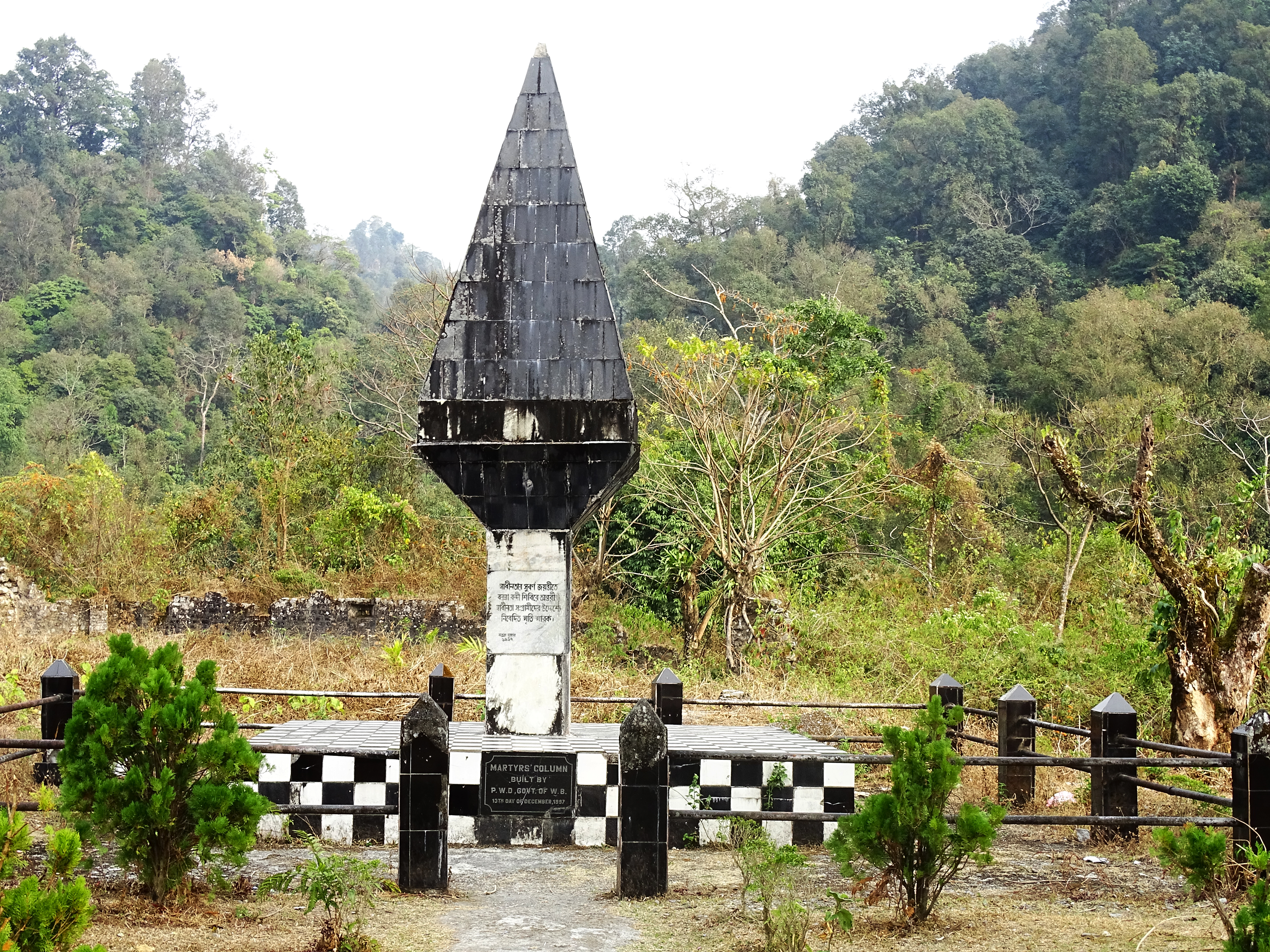
Buxa Fort Memorial

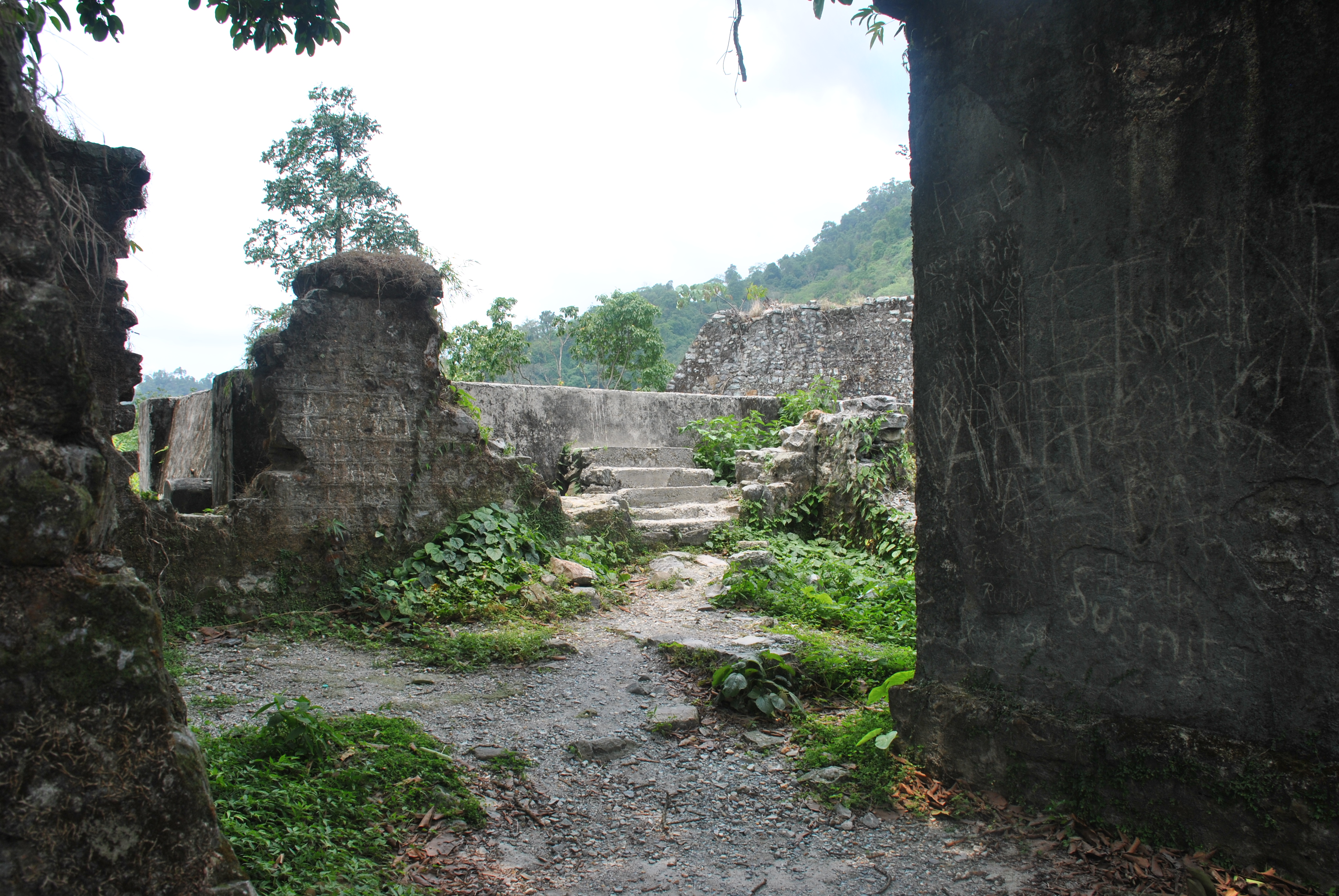
View of Buxa Fort used as Bengal Native Infantry barracks and afterwards as prison camp by the British Government. India later used it as camp for Tibetan refugee monks.

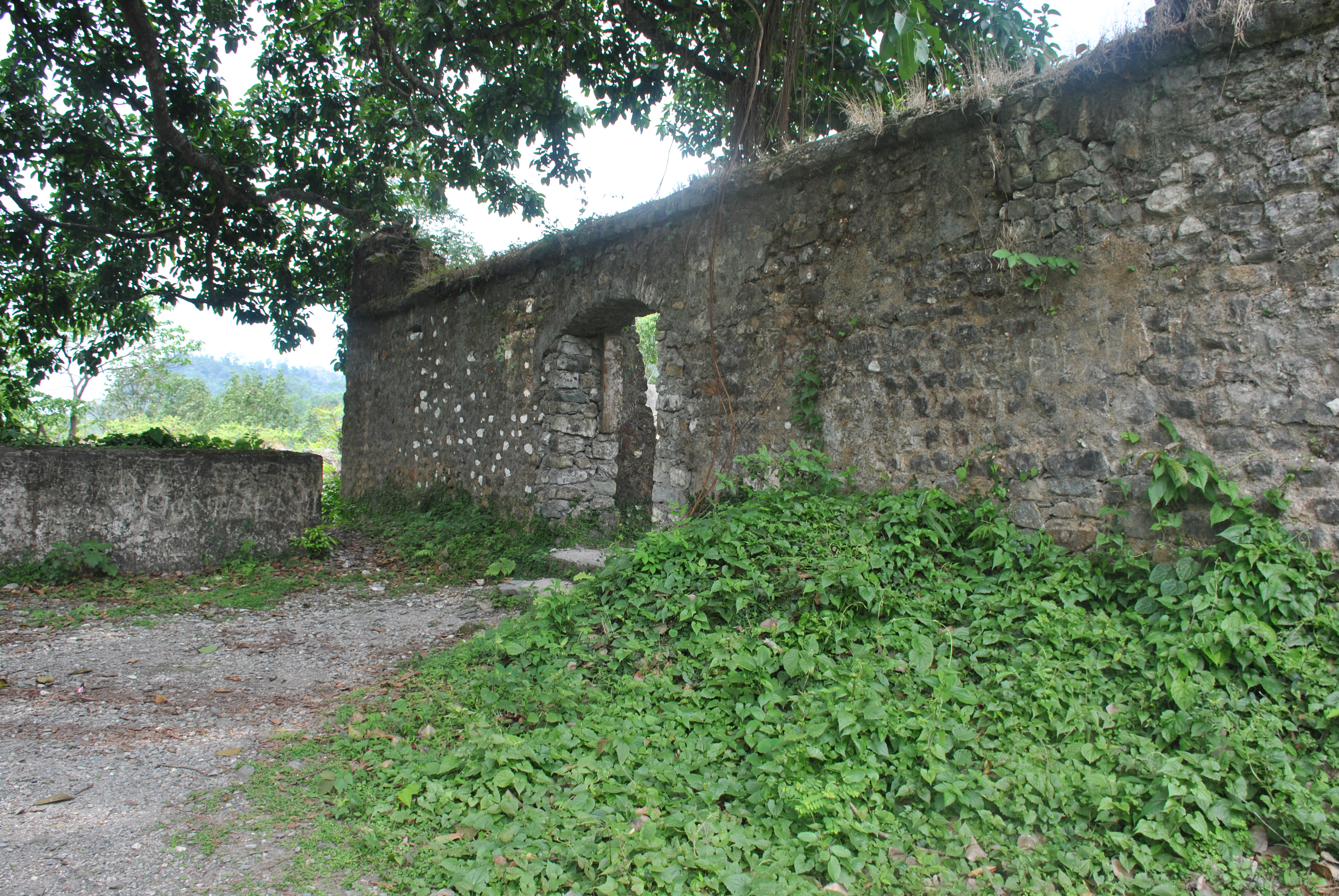
Inside Buxa Fort

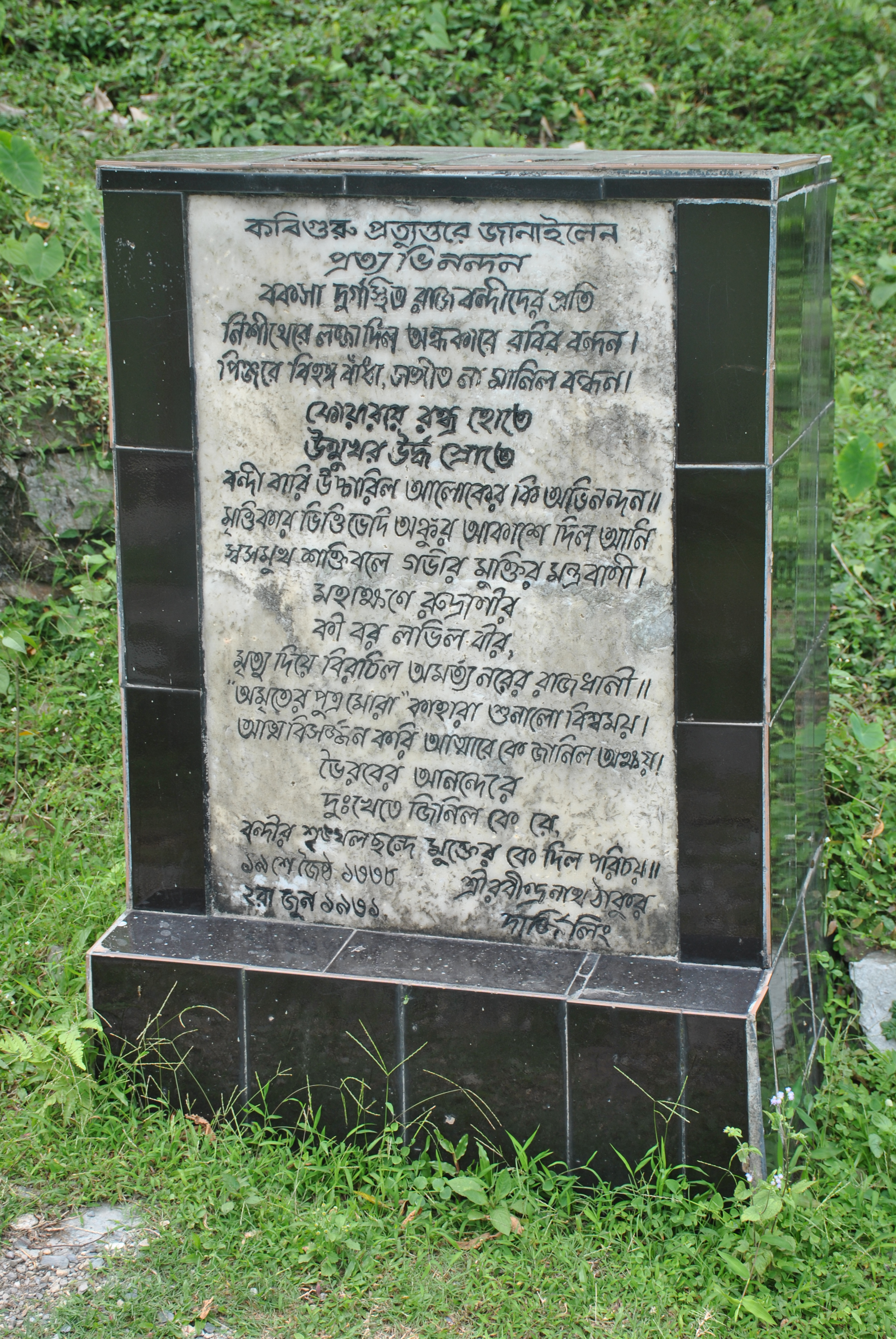
Buxa Fort stone tablet

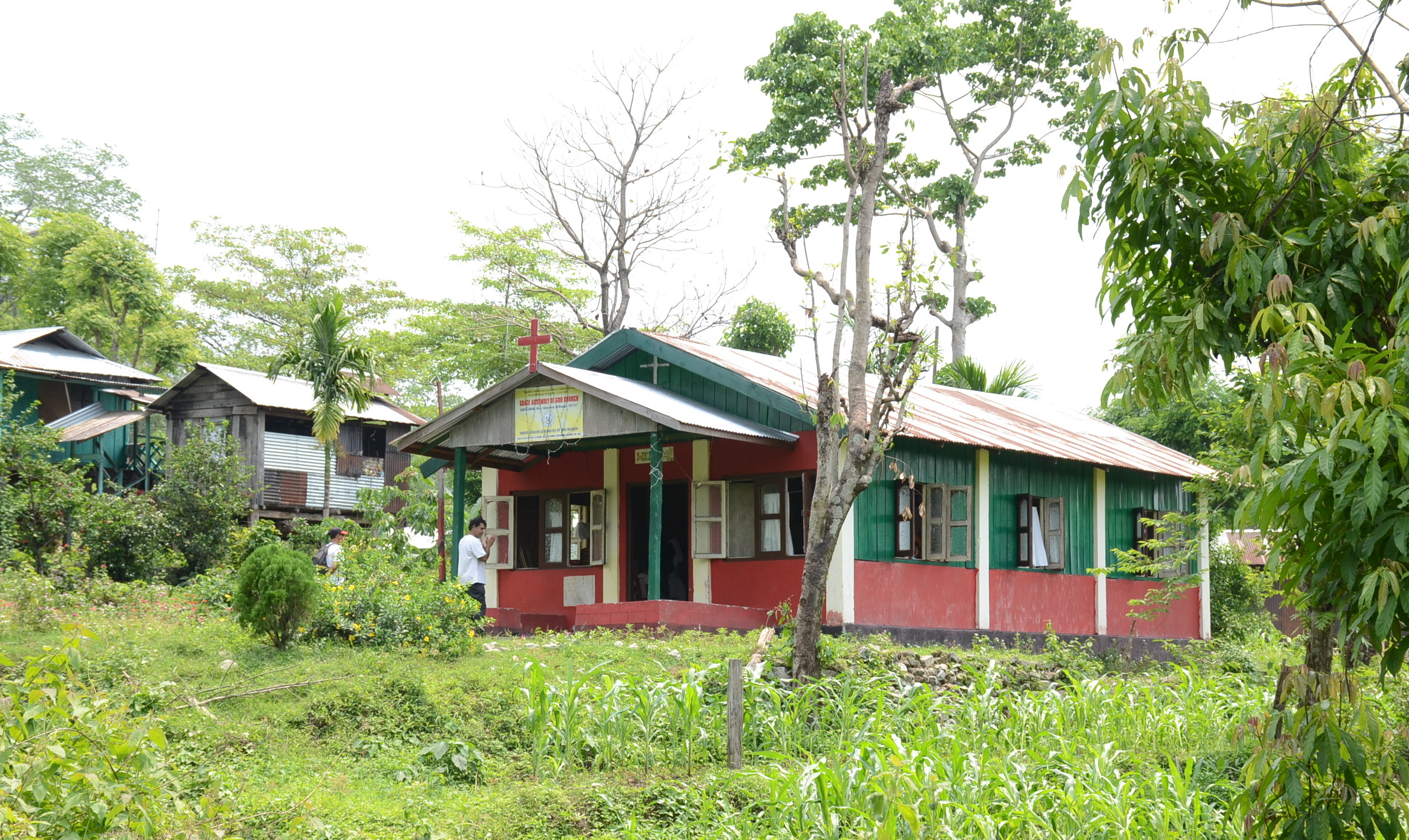
Grace Assembly of God Church Santalabari
