= Kodalbasti =

Buxa
- Census Town
- Country: India
- State: West Bengal
- District: Alipurduar

Languages
  - Official: Bengali
- Time zone: UTC+5:30 (IST)
- PIN: 735204
- Telephone code: 03561
- Vehicle registration: WB-70

Kodalbasti is a village in the Alipurduar district of West Bengal, India. It is about 22 kilometres (14 mi) away from Alipurduar and is a tourist destination. It is part of Chilapata Forest.
