= Samuktala Road Junction railway station =

Railway Station in West Bengal, India

Samuktala Road Junction

General information
- Location: National Highway 31C, Distt: Alipurduar, West Bengal, PIN-736208; India
- Coordinates: 26.4838°N 89.6355°E
- Elevation: 48 metres (157 ft)
- System: Indian Railways junction station
- Owner: Indian Railways
- Operator: North East Frontier Railway
- Lines: New Jalpaiguri–New Bongaigaon section of Barauni–Guwahati line New Jalpaiguri–Alipurduar–Samuktala Road line
- Platforms: 2

Construction
- Structure type: At grade
- Parking: Not required
- Cycle facilities: Not available

Other information
- Station code: SMTA
- Division(s): Alipurduar

History
- Opened: 1950
Location
- Location within West Bengal Location within India

Samuktala Road Junction is a railway junction station in Alipurduar district in the Indian state of West Bengal.

== History ==
With the partition of India in 1947, railway links of Assam and the Indian part of North Bengal, previously passing through eastern Bengal, were cut off from the rest of India. The Assam Rail Link project was taken up on 26 January 1948 and the first train ran on the route on 26 January 1950. The project was a 142-mile-long (229 km) 1,000 mm (3 ft 3 3/8 in) metre gauge line linking Fakiragram with Kishanganj. The route was converted to 5 ft 6 in (1,676 mm) broad gauge in 2003–2006.

The broad-gauge line from New Jalpaiguri to Samuktala Road was added in the 1960s.

Preceding station	Indian Railways	Following station
New Alipurduar towards ?	Northeast Frontier Railway zone New Jalpaiguri–New Bongaigaon section of Barauni–Guwahati line	Kamakhyaguri towards ?
Alipurduar Junction towards ?	Northeast Frontier Railway zone New Jalpaiguri–Alipurduar–Samuktala Road line	Terminus
