= Kumargram =

- Community development block
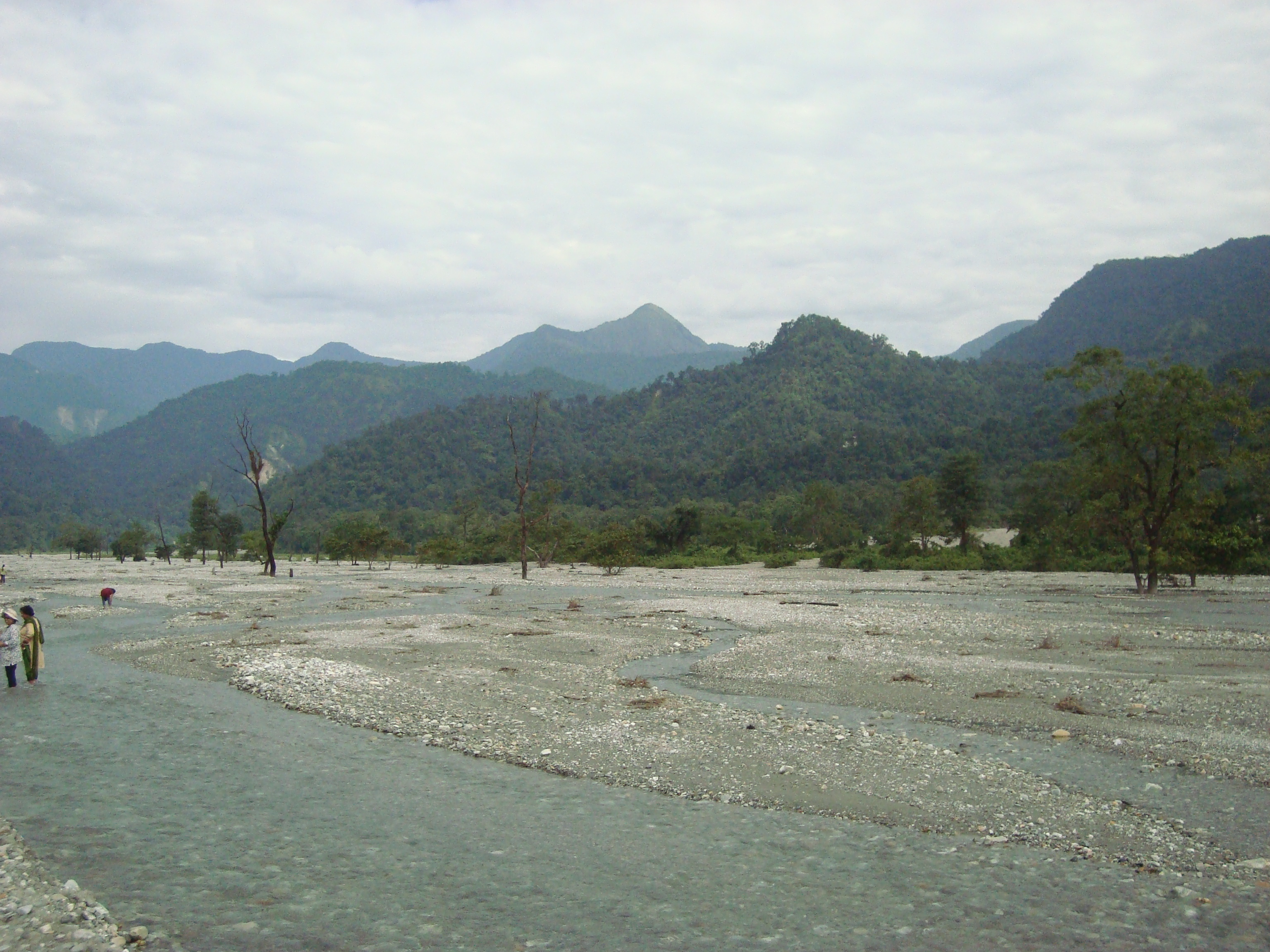
- Jayanti Hills in the northern part of Kumargram CD block

- Coordinates: 26.665°N 89.825°E
- Country: India
- State: West Bengal
- District: Alipurduar

Area
  - Total: 517.68 km^{2} (199.88 sq mi)

Population (2011)
  - Total: 199,609
  - Density: 385.58/km^{2} (998.66/sq mi)

Languages
  - Official: Bengali, English
- Time zone: UTC+5:30 (IST)
- Lok Sabha constituency: Alipurduars
- Vidhan Sabha constituency: Kumargram

Kumargram is a community development block (CD block) that forms an administrative division in the Alipurduar subdivision of the Alipurduar district in the Indian state of West Bengal.

== Geography ==
Kumargram is located at 26°39′54″N 89°49′30″E.

The Kumargarm CD Block lies in the eastern part of the district. The Sanaka River flows along the eastern boundary. It has hilly terrain which is part of the sub-Himalayan ranges.

Kumargram CD block is bounded by the Chukha District in Bhutan on the north, Gossaigaon Revenue Circle/ Tehsil in Kokrajhar district in Assam on the east, Tufanganj II CD block in Cooch Behar district on the south, and Alipurduar II and Kalchini CD blocks on the west.

The Kumargram CD block has an area of 517.68 km^{2}. It has 1 panchayat samity, 11 gram panchayats, 144 gram sansads (village councils), 55 mouzas, 53 inhabited villages and 3 census towns. Kumargram police station serves this block. Headquarters of this CD block is at Kumargram.

Gram panchayats of Kumargram block/ panchayat samiti are: Chengmari, Kamakhyaguri I, Kamakhyaguri II, Khoardanga I, Khoardanga II, Kumargram, Newland, Kumargram Sankos, Rydak, Turturikhanda, Valka Barabisa I, Valka Barabisa II.

== Demographics ==
=== Population ===
According to the 2011 Census of India, the Kumargram CD block had a population of 199,609, of which 174,058 were rural, and 25,551 were urban. There were 102,592 (51%) males and 97,017 (49%) females. There were 23,771 persons in the age range of 0 to 6 years. The Scheduled Castes numbered 71,417 (35.78%) and the Scheduled Tribes numbered 59,877 (30.00%).

According to the 2001 census, Kumargram block had a population of 177,894, of which 91,421 were males and 86,473 were females. Kumargram block registered a population growth of 15.60 per cent during the 1991-2001 decade.

Census towns in the Kumargram CD block are (2011 census figures in brackets): Laskarpara (7,137), Dakshin Rampur (6,932) and Uttar Kamakhyaguri (12,022).

Large villages (with 4,000+ population) in the Kumargram CD block are (2011 census figures in brackets): Kartika Tea Garden (4,779), Jayanti Tea Garden (5,098), Raydak Tea Garden (7,610), Madhya Narathali (4,598), Paschim Narathali (4,665), Dakshin Narathali (7,433), Madhya Kamakhyaguri (4,759), Telipara (4,139), Narathali (6,337), Newlands Tea Garden (6,369), Kumargram Tea Garden (6,328), Sankos Tea Garden (6,643), Kumargram (5,384), Madhya Haldibari (4,252), Barabisa (4,433) and Purba Chakchaka (4,523).

Other villages in the Kumargram CD block include (2011 census figures in brackets): Chengmari (1,658), Turtiuri Khanda (2,844) and Bhalka (3,946).

=== Literacy ===
According to the 2011 census, the total number of literate persons in the Kumargram CD block was 127,335 (72.48% of the population over 6 years) out of which males numbered 71,202 (78.76% of the male population over 6 years) and females numbered 56,135 (65.71% of the female population over 6 years). The gender disparity (the difference between female and male literacy rates) was 13.05%.

See also – List of West Bengal districts ranked by literacy rate

Literacy in CD blocks of
Jalpaiguri district
Jalpaiguri Sadar subdivision
Rajganj – 62.82%
Jalpaiguri – 73.81%
Maynaguri – 75.63%
Dhupguri – 60.57%
Malbazar subdivision
Mal – 66.31
Matiali – 66.98%
Nagrakata – 61.27%
Alipurduar subdivision
Madarihat-Birpara – 67.77%
Kalchini – 68.96%
Kumargram – 72.42%
Alipurduar I – 78.19%
Alipurduar II – 75.76%
Falakata – 72.64%
2011 Census: CD Block Wise

Primary Census Abstract Data

=== Language and religion ===
Religion in Kumargram CD block (2011)
Hinduism	82.27%
Christianity	11.97%
Islam	4.34%
Buddhism	0.79%
Other or not stated	0.63%

In the 2011 Census of India, Hindus numbered 164,226 and formed 82.27% of the population of Kumargram CD block. Christians numbered 23,901 and formed 11.97% of the population. Muslims numbered 25,591 and formed 4.34% of the population. Buddhists numbered 1,584 and formed 0.79% of the population. Others numbered 710 and formed 0.36% of the population. Others include Addi Bassi, Marang Boro, Santal, Saranath, Sari Dharma, Sarna, Alchchi, Bidin, Sant, Saevdharm, Seran, Saran, Sarin, Kheria, and other religious communities.

Languages of Kumargram CD block (2011)
1. Bengali (46.6%)
2. Sadri (14.7%)
3. Kurukh (9.20%)
4. Rajbongshi (8.24%)
5. Nepali (5.23%)
6. 'Other' Bengali (5.20%)
7. Boro (4.62%)
8. Rabha (1.68%)
9. Hindi (1.25%)
10. Others (3.27%)

At the time of the 2011 census, 46.59% of the population spoke Bengali, 14.72% Sadri, 9.20% Kurukh, 8.24% Rajbongshi, 5.23% Nepali, 4.62% Boro, 1.68% Rabha and 1.25% Hindi as their first language. 5.20% were recorded as speaking 'Other' under Bengali.

== Poverty level ==
Based on a study of the per capita consumption in rural and urban areas, using central sample data of NSS 55th Round 1999-2000, Jalpaiguri district was found to have relatively high rates of poverty of 35.73% in rural areas and 61.53% in the urban areas. It was one of the few districts where urban poverty rate was higher than the rural poverty rate.

According to a World Bank report, as of 2012, 26-31% of the population of Jalpaiguri, Bankura and Paschim Medinipur districts were below poverty line, a relatively high level of poverty in West Bengal, which had an average 20% of the population below poverty line.

== Economy ==
=== Livelihood ===
Livelihood
in Kumargrm CD block
1. Cultivators (15.4%)
2. Agricultural labourers (26.2%)
3. Household industries (3.67%)
4. Other Workers (54.7%)

In the Kumargram CD block in 2011, among the class of total workers, cultivators numbered 12,190 and formed 15.41%, agricultural labourers numbered 20,744 and formed 26.23%, household industry workers numbered 2,901 and formed 3.67% and other workers numbered 43,264 and formed 54.70%. Total workers numbered 79,099 and formed 39.63% of the total population, and non-workers numbered 120,510 and formed 60.37% of the population.

Note: In the census records a person is considered a cultivator, if the person is engaged in cultivation/ supervision of land owned by self/government/institution. When a person who works on another person's land for wages in cash or kind or share, is regarded as an agricultural labourer. Household industry is defined as an industry conducted by one or more members of the family within the household or village, and one that does not qualify for registration as a factory under the Factories Act. Other workers are persons engaged in some economic activity other than cultivators, agricultural labourers and household workers. It includes factory, mining, plantation, transport and office workers, those engaged in business and commerce, teachers, entertainment artistes and so on.

=== Infrastructure ===
There are 53 inhabited villages in the Kumargram CD block, as per the District Census Handbook, Jalpaiguri, 2011. 100% villages have power supply. 51 villages (96.23%) have drinking water supply. 21 villages (39.62%) have post offices. 47 villages (88.68%) have telephones (including landlines, public call offices and mobile phones). 36 villages (67.92%) have pucca (paved) approach roads and 21 villages (58.49%) have transport communication (includes bus service, rail facility and navigable waterways). 5 villages (9.43%) have agricultural credit societies and 7 villages (13.21%) have banks.

=== Agriculture ===
The economy of the Jalpaiguri district is mainly dependent on agriculture and plantations, and majority of the people are engaged in agriculture. Jalpaiguri is well-known for tea and timber. Other important crops are paddy, jute, tobacco, mustard seeds, sugarcane and wheat. The annual average rainfall is 3,440 mm, around double of that of Kolkata and the surrounding areas. The area is flood prone and the rivers often change course causing immense damage to crops and cultivated lands.

In 2013-14, there were 64 fertiliser depots, 39 seed stores and 49 fair price shops in the Kumargram CD block.

In 2013–14, the Kumargram CD block produced 21,175 tonnes of Aman paddy, the main winter crop, from 10,536 hectares, 868 tonnes of Boro paddy (spring crop) from 339 hectares, 4,806 tonnes of Aus paddy (summer crop) from 2,507 hectares, 3,466 tonnes of wheat from 1,272 hectares, 1,730 tonnes of maize from 222 hectares, 11,004 tonnes of jute from 823 hectares and 64,503 tonnes of potatoes from 2,483 hectares. It also produced pulses and oilseeds.

In 2013-14, the total area irrigated in the Kumargarm CD block was 3,535 hectares, out of which 1,655 hectares were irrigated by canal water, 125 hectares by tank water, 625 hectares by river lift irrigation, 40 hectares by deep tube wells, 695 hectares by shallow tube wells, 395 hectares by open dug wells.

=== Dooars-Terai tea gardens ===
Tea gardens in the Dooars and Terai regions produce 226 million kg or over a quarter of India's total tea crop.. The Dooars-Terai tea is characterized by a bright, smooth and full-bodied liquor that's a wee bit lighter than Assam tea. Cultivation of tea in the Dooars was primarily pioneered and promoted by the British but there was significant contribution of Indian entrepreneurs.

=== Banking ===
In 2013-14, Kumargram CD block had offices of 6 commercial banks and 1 gramin bank.

=== Backward Regions Grant Fund ===
The Jalpaiguri district is listed as a backward region and receives financial support from the Backward Regions Grant Fund. The fund, created by the Government of India, is designed to redress regional imbalances in development. As of 2012, 272 districts across the country were listed under this scheme. The list includes 11 districts of West Bengal.

== Transport ==
Kumargram CD block has 8 ferry services and 4 originating/ terminating bus routes.

NH 31C passes through the block.

Only Railway Station - Kamakhyaguri Railway Station.

== Education ==
In 2013-14, Kumargram CD block had 127 primary schools with 12,898 students, 14 middle schools with 1,906 students, 3 high school with 3,402 students and 12 higher secondary schools with 17,454 students. Kumargram CD block had 1 general degree college with 4,140, 3 technical/ professional institutions with 230 students, 607 institutions for special and non-formal education with 26,554 students.

See also – Education in India

According to the 2011 census, in the Kumargram CD block, among the 53 inhabited villages, all villages had schools, 46 villages had two or more primary schools, 40 villages had at least 1 primary and 1 middle school and 15 villages had at least 1 middle and 1 secondary school.

Saheed Kshudiram College was established at Kamakhyaguri in 1996. Affiliated with the University of North Bengal, it offers courses in arts and science.

== Sports ==
Kumargram popularly known for marathon oneday knockout football tournaments organised by different village clubs. There are many talented athletes need more attention, by which they can bring success for pride of this region. The major play ground are Kumargram Football Ground, Barobisha HS Ground, Kamakhyaguri High School Maidan, Kamakhyaguri mini indoor stadium.

== Healthcare ==
In 2014, Kumargram CD block had 1 rural hospital, 2 primary health centres and 2 NGO/ private nursing homes with total 72 beds and 8 doctors (excluding private bodies). It had 35 family welfare subcentres. 5,414 patients were treated indoor and 81,846 patients were treated outdoor in the hospitals, health centres and subcentres of the CD block.

Kamakhyaguri Rural Hospital, with 30 beds at Kamakhyaguri, is the major government medical facility in the Kumargram CD block. There are primary health centres at Kumargram (with 6 beds), Barabisa (PO Kumargram) (with 6 beds).
