= Salbari railway station =

Railway Station in West Bengal, India

Salbari Railway Station

General information
- Location: National Highway 31D, Salbari, Pin - 735210, Dist - Alipurduar State: West Bengal; India
- Coordinates: 26.5522047001°N 89.0757937°E
- Elevation: 69 metres (226 ft)
- System: Indian Railways Station
- Owner: Indian Railways
- Operator: Northeast Frontier Railway zone
- Lines: Barauni–Guwahati line, New Jalpaiguri–New Bongaigaon section
- Platforms: 2
- Tracks: 3 (broad gauge)

Construction
- Parking: Available

Other information
- Status: Functioning
- Station code: SXX
- Zone(s): Northeast Frontier Railway zone
- Division(s): Alipurduar
Location
- Location within West Bengal Location within India

Salbari Railway Station serves the town of Salbari, near River Jaldhaka, Alipurduar district in the Indian state of West Bengal. The station is part of Alipurduar railway division and lies on the New Jalpaiguri–New Bongaigaon section of Barauni–Guwahati line of Northeast Frontier Railway.
