= Uttar Kamakhyaguri =

Kamakhyaguri
- Census Town
- Kamakhyaguri
- Location in West Bengal, India Kamakhyaguri (India)
- Coordinates: 26.48°N 89.73°E
- Country: India
- State: West Bengal
- District: Alipurduar

Population (2011)
  - Total: 32,000

Languages
  - Official: Bengali, English
- Time zone: UTC+5:30 (IST)
- PIN: 736202
- Vehicle registration: WB
- Lok Sabha constituency: Alipurduars (ST)
- Vidhan Sabha constituency: Kumargram (ST)
- Website: alipurduar.gov.in

Kamakhyaguri is a town and business destination in the Kumargram CD block in the Alipurduar subdivision of the Alipurduar district in the Indian state of West Bengal.

== Area overview ==
The Alipurduar district is an extensive area in the eastern end of the Dooars in West Bengal. It is undulating country, largely forested, with numerous rivers flowing down from the outer ranges of the Himalayas in Bhutan. It is a predominantly rural area with 79.38% of the population living in the rural areas. The district has 1 municipal town and 20 census towns and that means that 20.62% of the population lives in the urban areas. The scheduled castes and scheduled tribes together form more than half the population in all the six community development blocks in the district. There is high concentration of tribal people (scheduled tribes) in the three northern blocks of the district.

== Demographics ==
As of 2011 census, Uttar Kamakhyaguri is a census town in the district of Alipurduar, West Bengal. The Uttar Kamakhyaguri census town has population of 12,022 of which 6,132 are males while 5,890 are females as per the report released by Census India 2011.

The population of children ages 0–6 is 1006 which is 8.37% of the total population of Uttar Kamakhyaguri (CT). In Uttar Kamakhyaguri Census Town, female sex ratio is of 961 against state average of 950. Moreover the child sex ratio in Uttar Kamakhyaguri is around 992 compared to West Bengal state average of 956. The literacy rate of Uttar Kamakhyaguri city is 91.81% higher than the state average of 76.26%. In Uttar Kamakhyaguri, male literacy is around 94.63% while the female literacy rate is 88.87%.

Uttar Kamakhyaguri Census Town has total administration over 2,826 houses to which it supplies basic amenities like water and sewerage. It is authorized to build roads in Census Town limits and impose taxes on properties coming under its jurisdiction.

== Healthcare ==
Kamakhyaguri Rural Hospital is the major government medical facility in the Kumargram CD block.
