= Buxa Tiger Reserve =

Tiger reserve in West Bengal, India

- IUCN category II (national park)
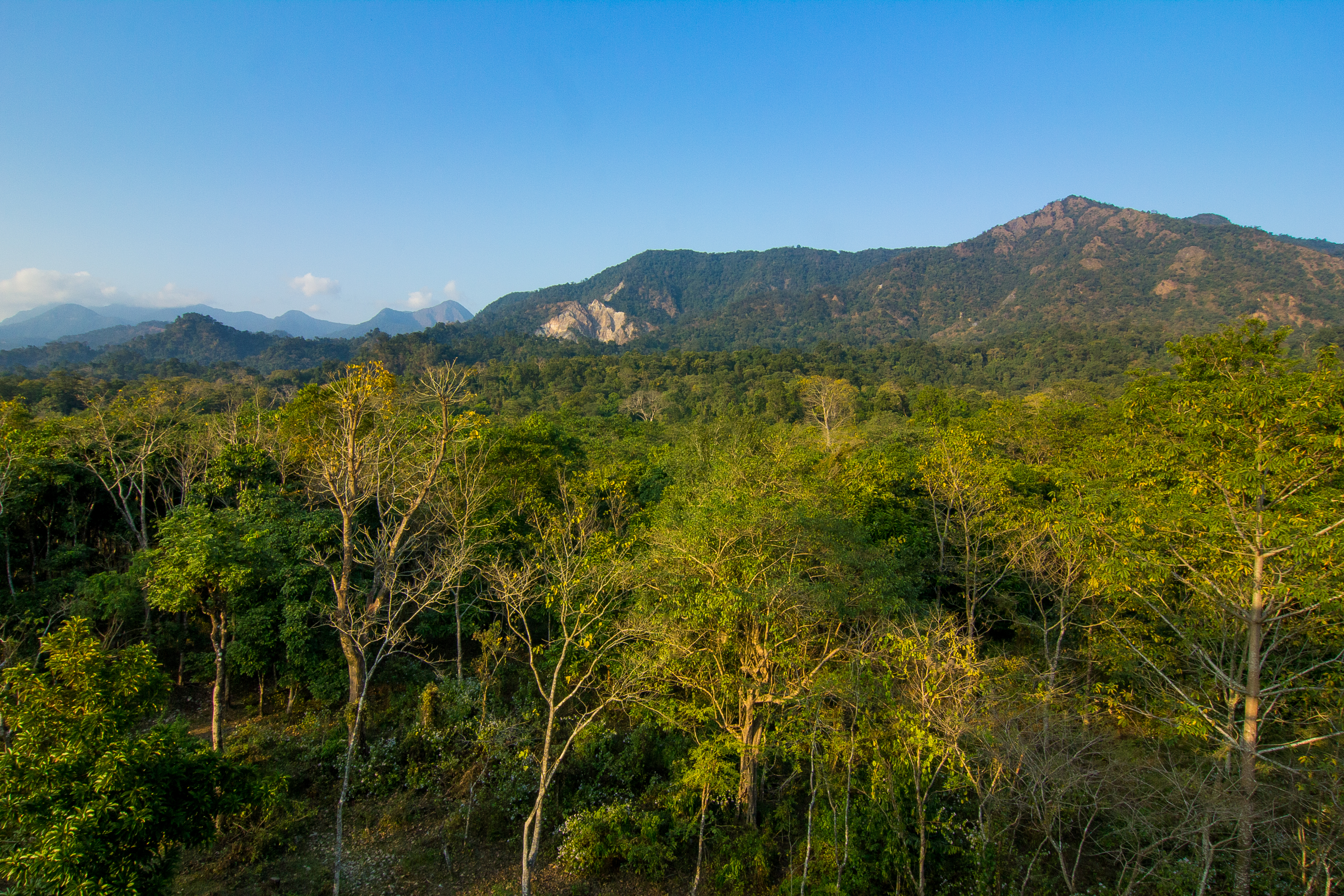
- Buxa Tiger Reserve

- Location within West Bengal Location within India
- Interactive map of Buxa Tiger Reserve
- Location: West Bengal, India
- Nearest city: Alipurduar
- Coordinates: 26°39′0″N 89°34′48″E
- Area: 760 km^{2} (290 sq mi)
- Established: 1983; 43 years ago
- Governing body: Ministry of Environment Forests and Climate Change, Government of India

Buxa Tiger Reserve is a tiger reserve and national park in northern West Bengal, India, covering an area of 760 km^{2} (290 sq mi). It ranges in elevation from 60 m (200 ft) in the Gangetic Plains to 1,750 m (5,740 ft) bordering the Himalayas in the north. At least 284 bird species inhabit the reserve. Mammals present include Asian elephant, gaur, Sambar deer, clouded leopard, Indian leopard, and Asian golden cat. The Bengal tiger is also present but rarely seen; as of 2005, Buxa Tiger Reserve had only one resident tiger.

== History ==
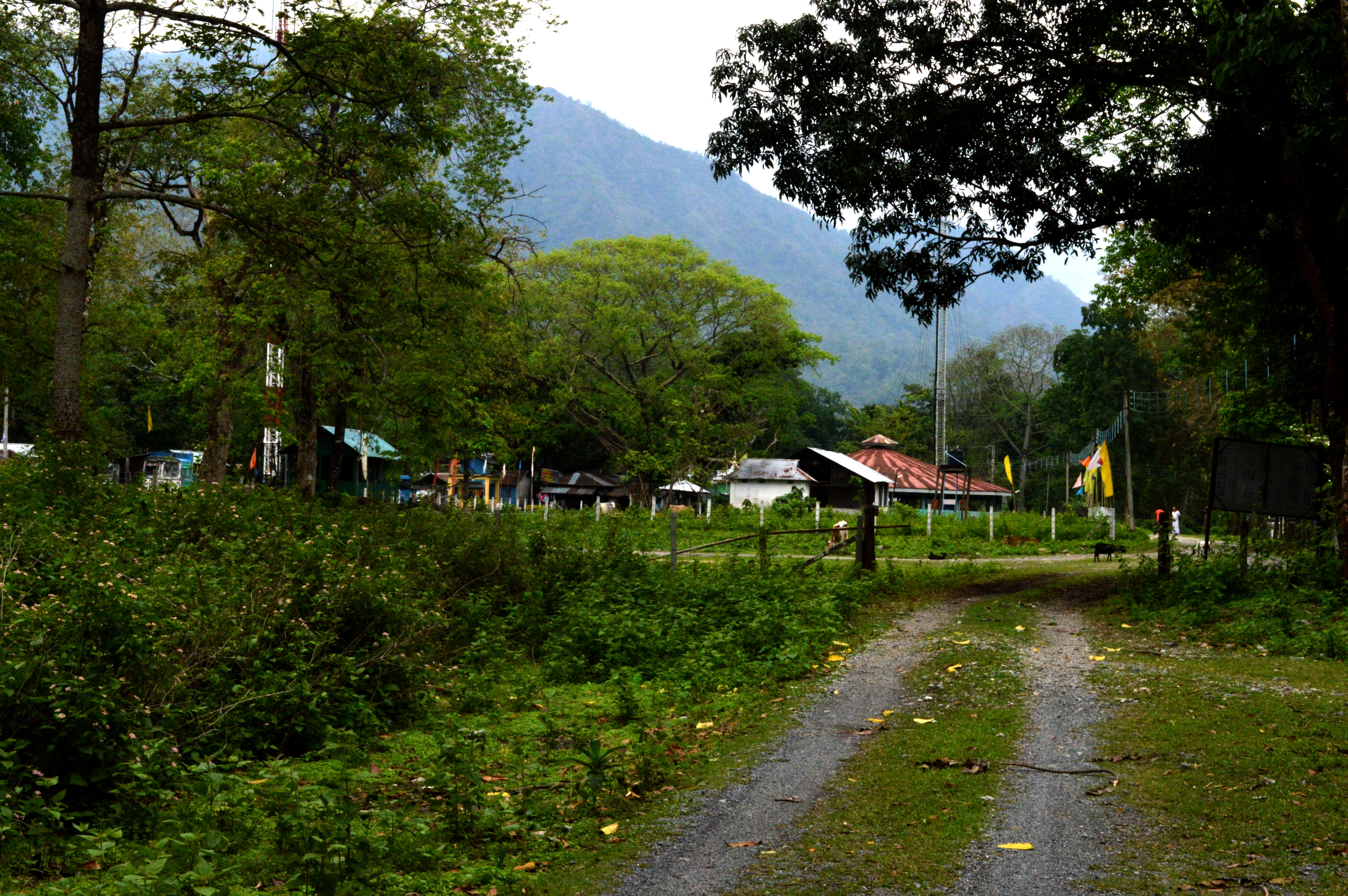
Buxa National park Jayanti range

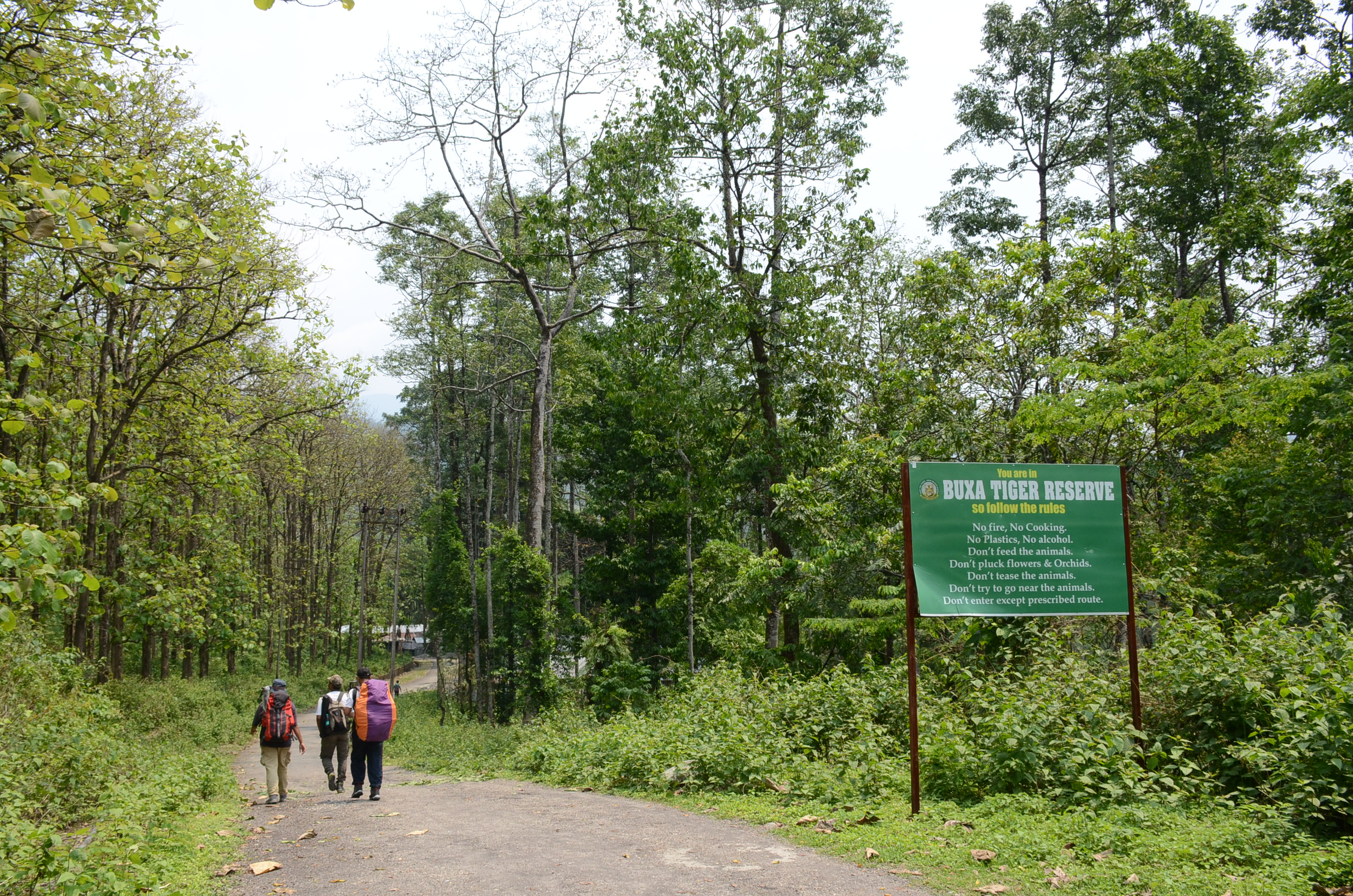
Buxa Tiger Reserve

Buxa Tiger Reserve was created in 1983 as the 15th tiger reserve in India. In 1986, Buxa Wildlife Sanctuary was constituted over 314.52 km^{2} (121.44 sq mi) of the reserve forests. In 1991, 54.47 km^{2} (21.03 sq mi) was added to Buxa Wildlife Sanctuary. In 1992, the Government of West Bengal declared its intentions to constitute a national park over 117.10 km^{2} (45.21 sq mi) of the Buxa Wildlife Sanctuary. State government finally declared national park with notification No.3403-For/11B-6/95 dt. 05.12.1997.

== Geography ==
=== Location ===
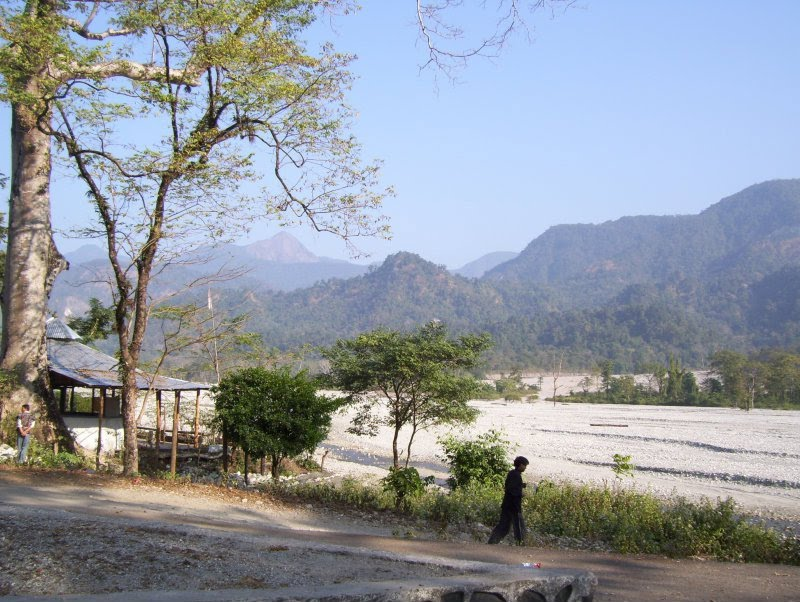
Jayanti hills

Buxa Tiger Reserve lies in Alipurduar district of West Bengal. Its northern boundary runs along the international border with Bhutan. The Sinchula hill range lies all along the northern side of Buxa Tiger Reserve, and the eastern boundary touches that of the Assam state. National Highway No.31 C roughly runs along its southern boundary. It is the easternmost extension of extreme bio-diverse North-East India and represents highly endemic Indo-Malayan region. Phibsoo Wildlife Sanctuary is contiguous to the north of Buxa Tiger Reserve, and Manas National Park is to the east, so that Buxa Tiger Reserve serves as international corridor for Asian elephant migration between India and Bhutan.

=== Geology ===
Buxa Tiger Reserve is contiguous with the Buxa Formation of Mamley in the state of Sikkim, the stromatolite bearing dolomite limestones, which has been declared a national geological monument for their protection, maintenance, promotion and enhancement of geotourism.

== Biodiversity ==
=== Flora ===
More than 450 species of trees, 250 species of shrubs, 400 species of herbs, 9 species of cane, 10 species of bamboo, 150 species of orchids, 100 species of grass and 130 species of aquatic flora including more than 70 sedges (Cyperaceae) have been identified so far. There are more than 160 species of other monocotyledons and ferns. The main trees are sal, champa, gamhar, simul and chikrasi.

Forest types include:

- Northern dry deciduous
- Eastern Bhabar and Terai sal
- East Himalayan moist mixed deciduous forest
- Sub-Himalayan secondary wet mixed forest
- Eastern sub-montane semi-evergreen forest
- Northern tropical evergreen forest
- East Himalayan subtropical wet hill forest
- Moist sal savannah
- Low alluvium
- Savannah woodland

=== Fauna ===
During a survey in May 2000 to July 2001, 284 bird species were recorded including Eurasian griffon (Gyps fulvus), Amur falcon (Falco amurensis), Malayan night heron (Gorsachius melanolophus), Oriental pied hornbill (Anthracoceros albirostris), rufous-necked hornbill (Aceros nipalensis), chestnut-breasted partridge (Arborophila mandellii), cinnamon bittern (Ixobrychus cinnamomeus), stripe-breasted woodpecker (Dendrocopos atratus), velvet-fronted nuthatch (Sitta frontalis) and black-naped oriole (Oriolus chinensis). The Narathali lake, Raidāk and Jayanti rivers provide habitat to migratory birds like common merganser (Mergus merganser), Eurasian teal (Anas crecca), black-necked crane (Grus nigricollis), black stork (Ciconia nigra), and ferruginous pochard (Aythya nyroca). Two new frog species were discovered in 2006.

The 73 mammal species include Indian leopard, Bengal tiger, clouded leopard, giant squirrel, gaur, chital and wild boar. 65 fish, 41 reptile and 4 amphibian species have been identified. In February 2018, both plain and spotted Asiatic golden cats (Catopuma temminckii) were recorded in the reserve for the first time.

Endangered species present in the reserve are leopard cat, Bengal florican, reticulated python, Chinese pangolin, hispid hare, hog deer lesser adjutant (Leptoptilos javanicus), white-rumped vulture (Gyps bengalensis), slender-billed vulture (Gyps tenuirostris), chestnut-breasted partridge (Arborophila mandellii), rufous necked hornbill (Aceros nipalensis), ferruginous pochard (Aythya nyroca) and great hornbill (Buceros bicornis).

== Threats ==
Hilly, Bhabhar and riverine tracts of core suffer from fire. Generally non timber forest produce collectors and shepherds put forests on fire. Poachers from Assam frequently come to poach Indian elephants.
