= Alipurduar district =

District in West Bengal, India

- District of West Bengal
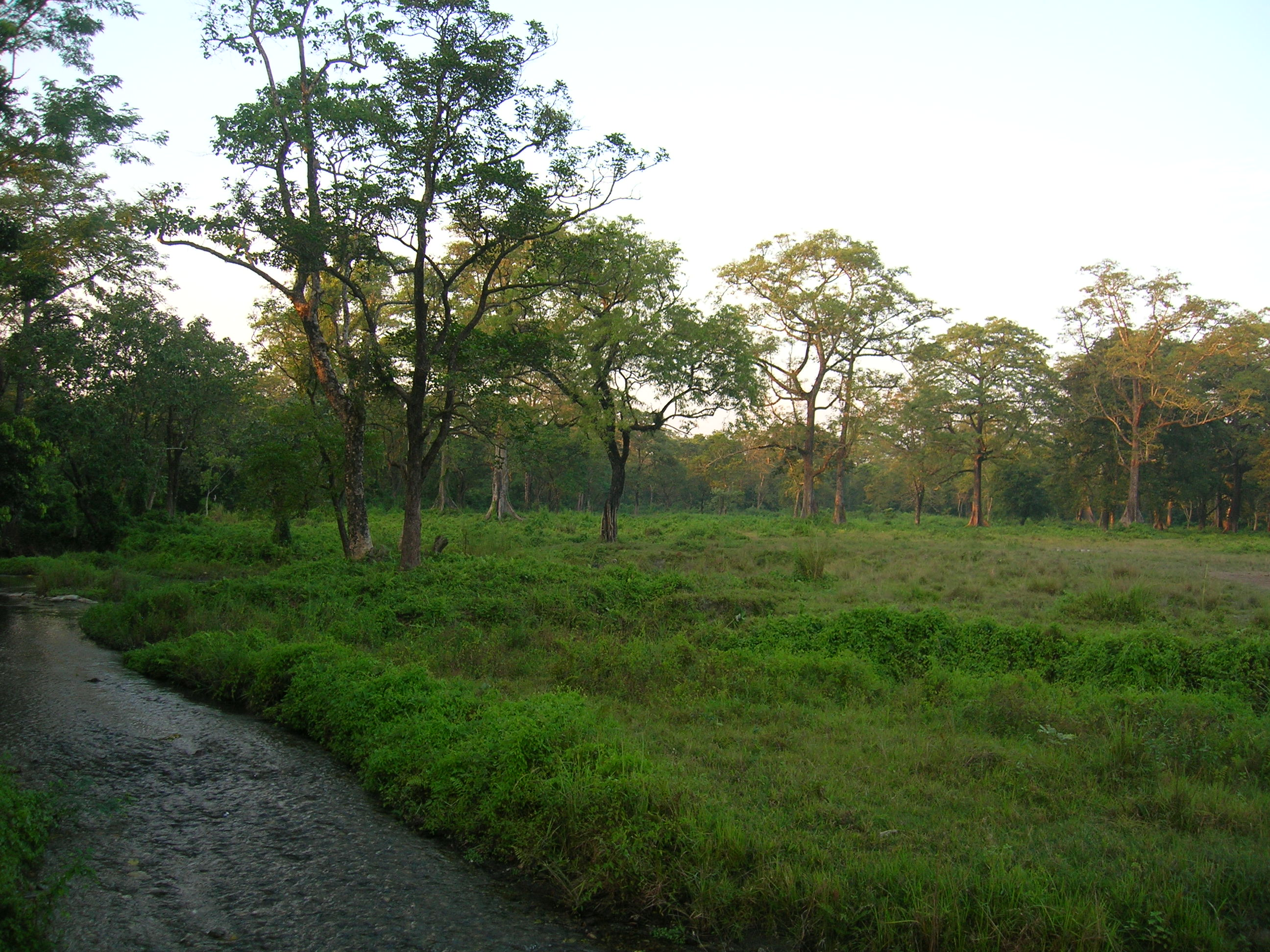
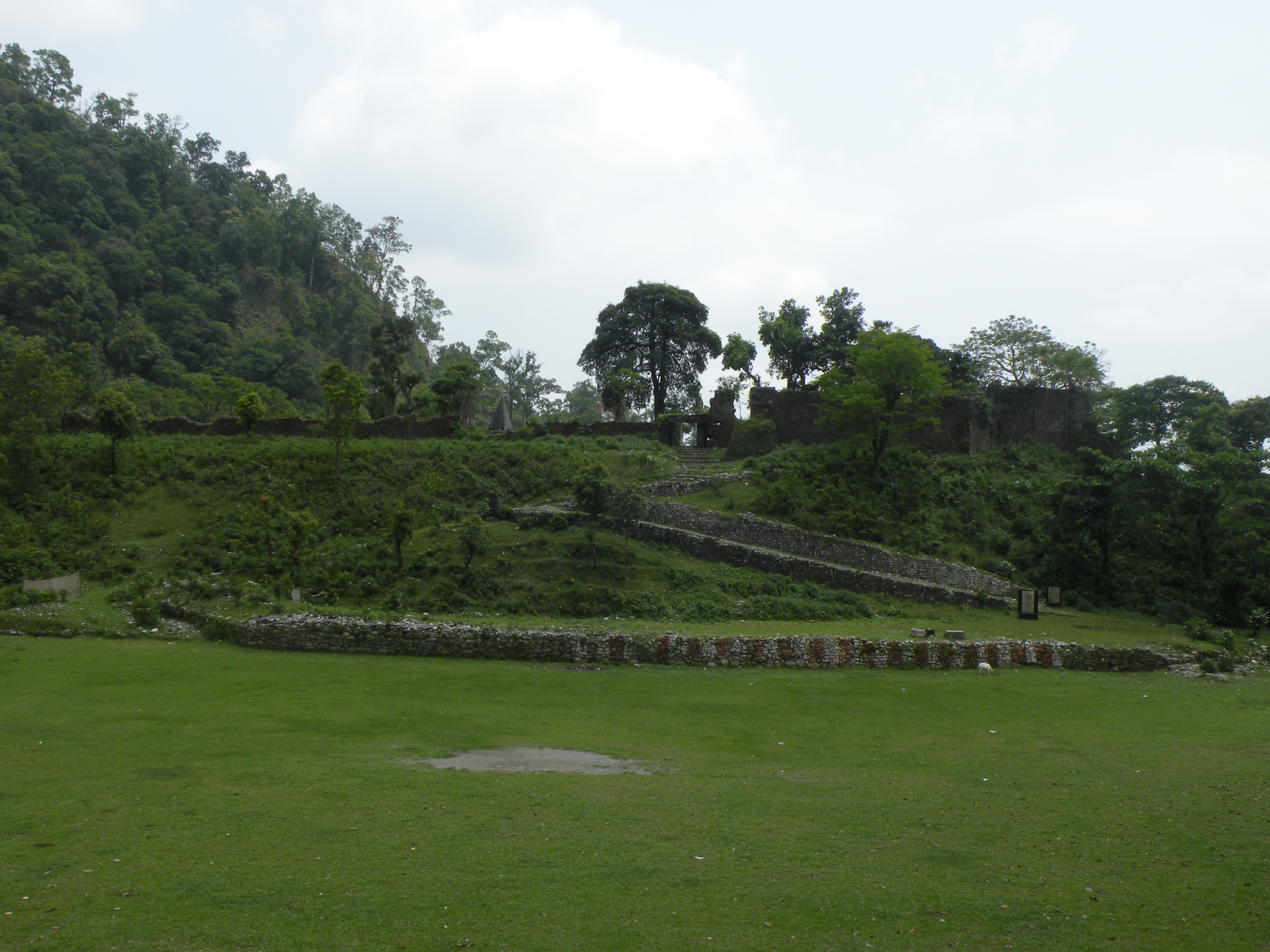
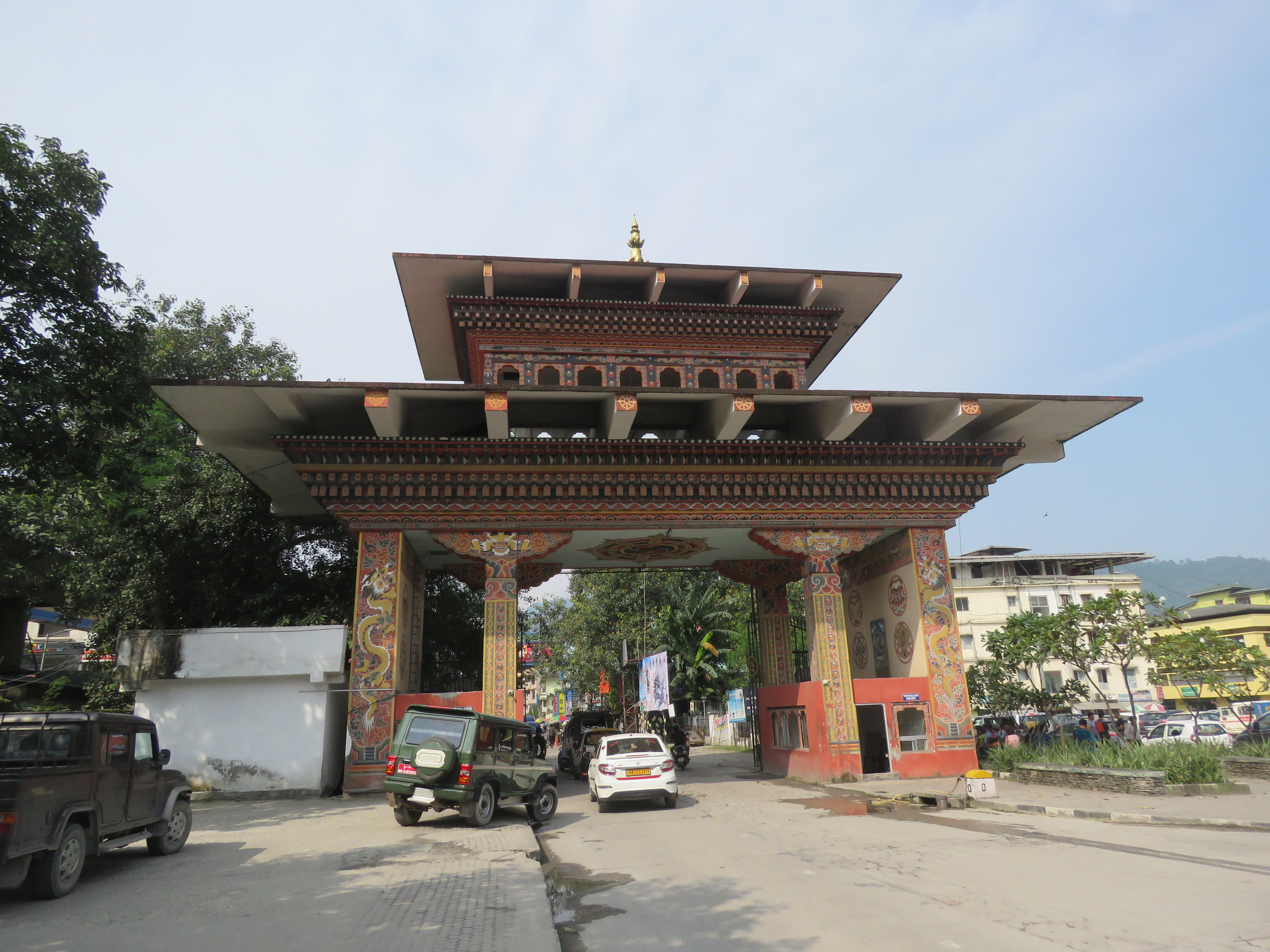
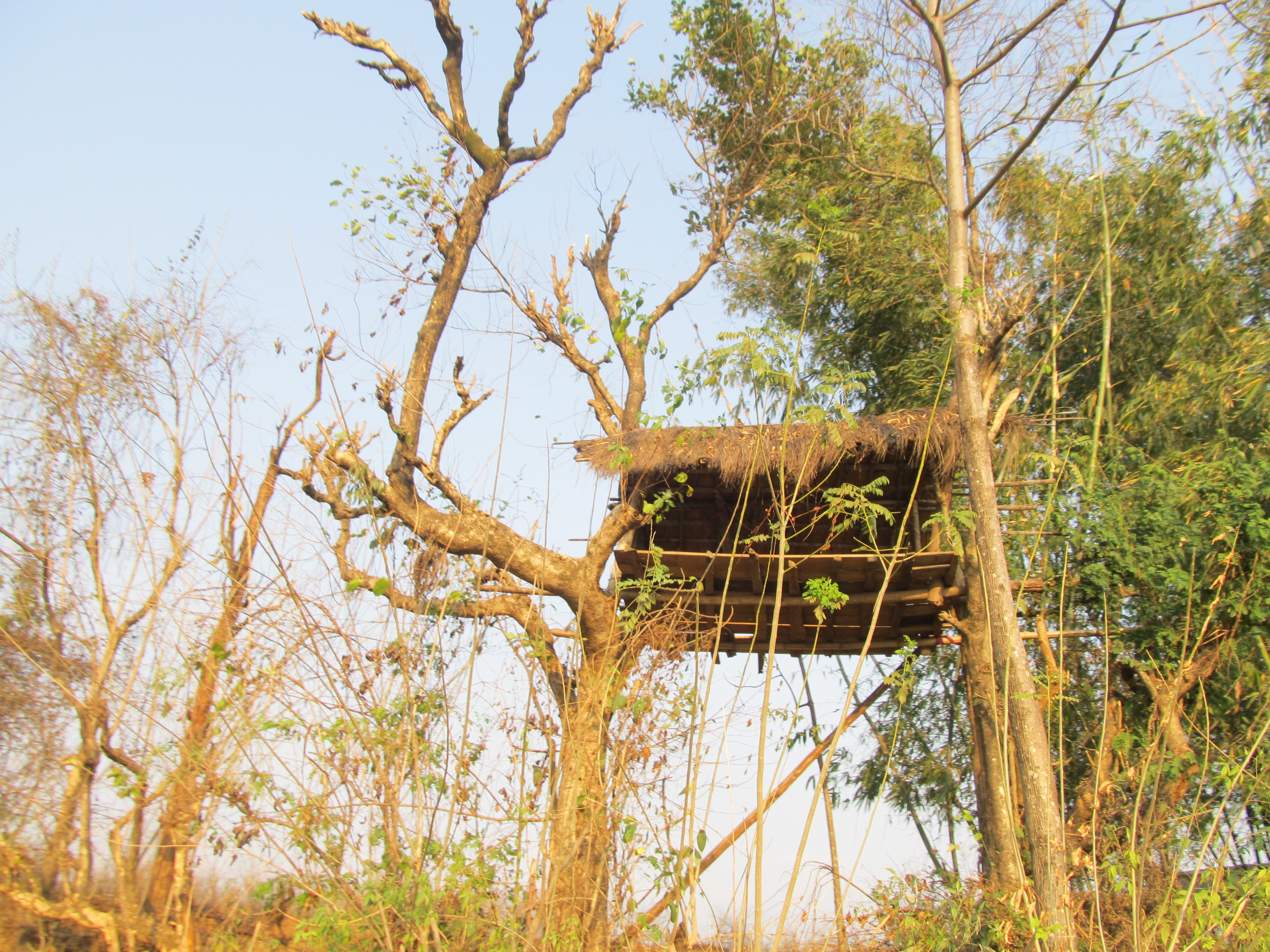
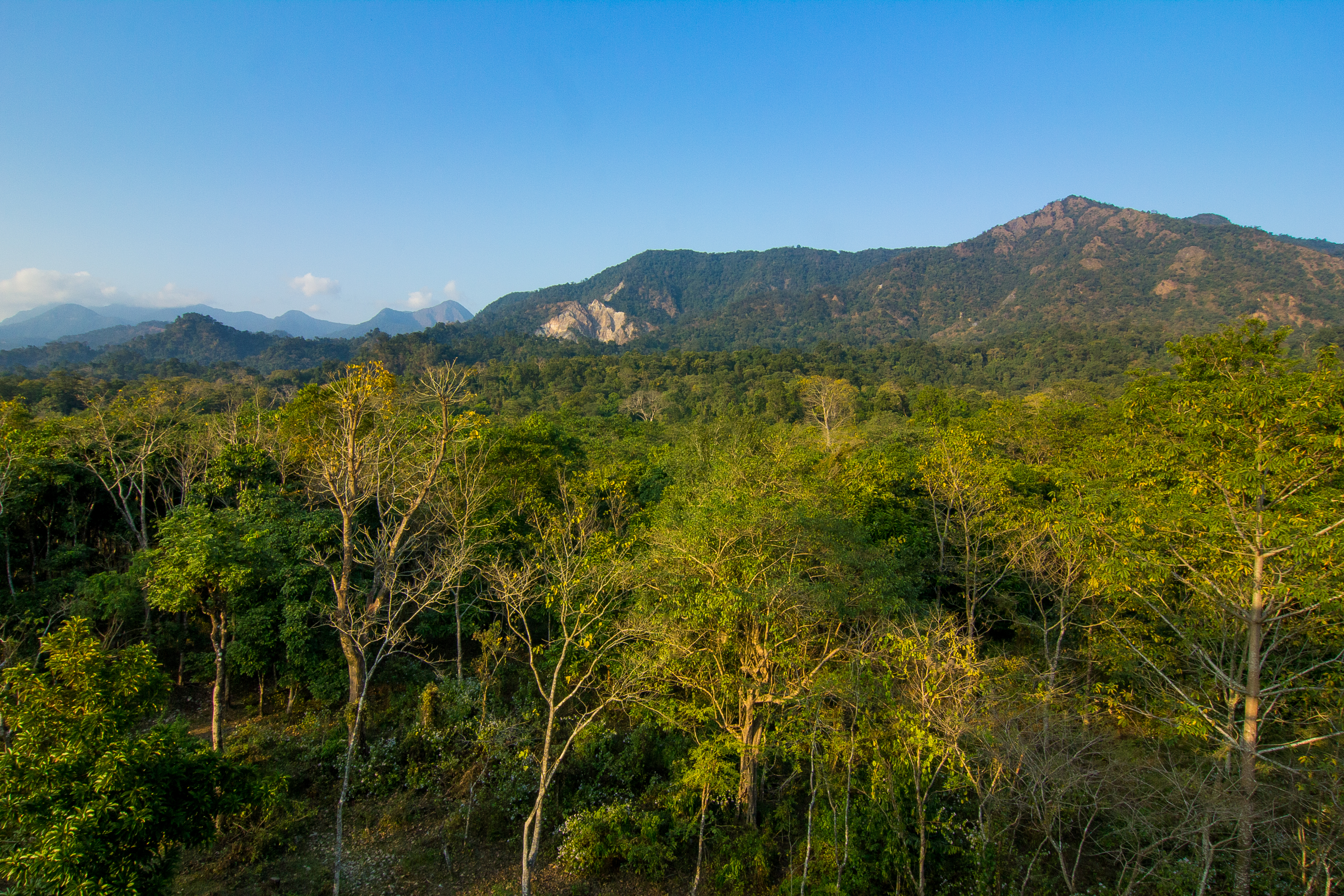
- Clockwise from top-left: Evening at Jaldapara National Park, ruins of Buxa Fort, Hut used by Toto aboriginals, Jayanti Hills in Buxa Tiger Reserve, Bhutan gate near Jaigaon

- Location of Alipurduar district in West Bengal
- Coordinates: 26.489°N 89.527°E
- Country: India
- State: West Bengal
- Division: Jalpaiguri
- Headquarters: Alipurduar

Government
  - Subdivisions: Alipurduar Sadar
  - CD Blocks: Madarihat-Birpara, Alipurduar I, Alipurduar II, Kalchini, Falakata, Kumargram
  - Lok Sabha constituencies: Alipurduars
  - Vidhan Sabha constituencies: Alipurduars, Kumargram, Falakata, Madarihat, Kalchini
  - District Magistrate: R. Vimala, IAS

Area
  - Total: 3,383 km^{2} (1,306 sq mi)

Population (2011)
  - Total: 1,491,250
  - Density: 440.8/km^{2} (1,142/sq mi)
  - Urban: 307,456

Demographics
  - Literacy: 78.57 per cent
  - Sex ratio: 949 ♂/♀

Languages
  - Official: Bengali
  - Additional official: English
- Time zone: UTC+05:30 (IST)
- Website: alipurduar.gov.in

Alipurduar district (Bengali pronunciation: [alipurduar d͡ʒela]), is one of the 23 districts of the state of West Bengal in India. The district is the part of Jalpaiguri Division. Alipurduar city is the headquarters of the district. It was made a district by bifurcating Jalpaiguri district on June 25, 2014. This is the easternmost district of West Bengal. It is situated in the Western Dooars natural region, in the foothills of the Bengal Himalayas.

== Etymology ==
Alipurduar's name originates from Colonel Hedayat Ali Khan, a British officer who fought in the 1865 Bhutan War and was stationed there, combined with "Duar" (or Door), representing its role as a gateway to the Dooars region of the Himalayas.

== History ==
=== Under the Kingdom of Bhutan ===
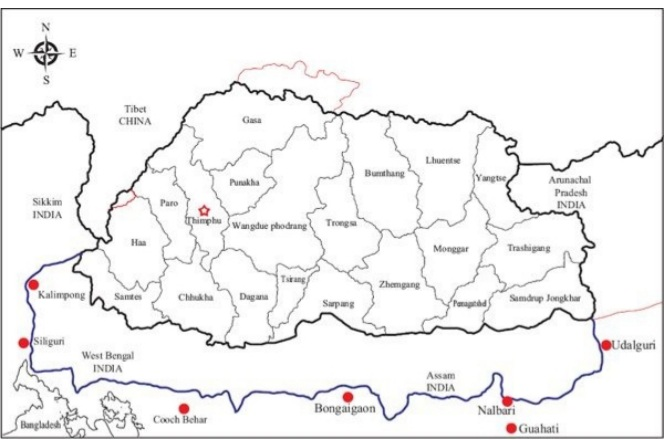
Southern Boundary of Bhutan contained the present Alipurduar district before 1865 Duar War

The Dooars in Alipurduar district were under the control of Kingdom of Bhutan from early 17th-century till 1865 when British East India company captured the area in the Duar War under the Treaty of Sinchula and were added to the district of Jalpaiguri in 1869 and later finally to the Indian Union in 1949.

Like all the Duars under Druk Gyalpo of Bhutan, it was under the jurisdiction of Tongso Penlop, below the Tongso Penlop were Subah who in turn appointed Mondal, Laskar or Uzir to look after the Duars.

== Administration ==
Apart from the Alipurduar municipality and Falakata municipality, the district contains eight census towns and rural areas of 66 gram panchayats under six community development blocks: Madarihat-Birpara, Alipurduar-I, Alipurduar–II, Kalchini, Falakata and Kumargram. Geographically the district lies between 26.4°N to 26.83°N and 89°E to 89.9°E.

The nine census towns are Paschim Jitpur, Chechakhata, Alipurduar Railway Junction, Bholar Dabri, Sobhaganj, Jaygaon and Uttar Latabari and Uttar Kamakhyaguri.

== Railway network ==
Alipurduar railway division has at least 710 km of railway track. It is the largest division of the Northeast Frontier Railway zone. In Alipurduar district, there are two major stations, Alipurduar Junction (APDJ) and New Alipurduar (NOQ). There are other stations in the district viz. Falakata Railway Station, Kamakhyaguri Railway Station, Dalgaon Railway Station, Hasimara railway station, Kalchini railway station, Rajabhatkhawa, Mujnai railway station, Madarihat railway station, Hamiltonganj railway station, Samuktala Road Junction railway station, Salbari railway station etc.

== Legislative segments ==
There are 5 assembly constituency in Alipurduar district :

No.	Name	Lok Sabha	MLA	2021 Winner	2024 Lead
10	Kumargram (ST)	Alipurduars	Manoj Kumar Oraon	Bharatiya Janata Party	Bharatiya Janata Party
11	Kalchini (ST)	Alipurduars	Bishal Lama	Bharatiya Janata Party	Bharatiya Janata Party
12	Alipurduars	Alipurduars	Suman Kanjilal (Note: Suman Kanjilal was elected as a BJP MLA. However, on 5 February 2023, he defected to the Trinamool Congress)	Trinamool Congress	Bharatiya Janata Party
13	Falakata (SC)	Alipurduars	Dipak Barman	Bharatiya Janata Party	Bharatiya Janata Party
14	Madarihat (ST)	Alipurduars	Jay Prakash Toppo	Trinamool Congress	Bharatiya Janata Party

As per order of the Delimitation Commission in respect of the delimitation of constituencies in the West Bengal, the area under Kumargram block and seven gram panchayats under Alipurduar–II block, viz. Bhatibari, Kohinoor, Parokata, Mahakalguri, Shamuktala, Turturi and Tatpara–I constitutes the Kumargram assembly constituency of West Bengal. The Majherdabri gram panchayat under Alipurduar–II block and the area under Kalchini block constitutes the Kalchini assembly constituency. The Alipurduar municipality, the Alipurduar Railway Junction census town, and the gram panchayats of Chaporer Par–I, Chaporer Par–II and Tatpara–II under Alipurduar–II block and ten gram panchayats of Alipurduar–I block, viz. Banchukamari, Parorpar, Shalkumar–I, Vivekananda–I, Chakowakheti, Patlakhawa, Shalkumar–II, Vivekananda–II, Mathura and Tapsikhata form the Alipurduars assembly constituency. The other gram panchayat of Alipurduar–I block, viz. Purba Kanthalbari forms the Falakata assembly constituency along with the area under Falakata block. Madarihat block is part of Madarihat assembly constituency. Kumargram, Kalchini and Madarihat constituencies is reserved for Scheduled tribes (ST) candidates. Falakata constituency is reserved for Scheduled castes (SC) candidates. All these five assembly constituencies are part of Alipurduars (Lok Sabha constituency), which is reserved for ST candidates.

== Demographics ==
As of the 2011 census, Alipurduar district had a population of 1,491,250, of which 1,183,704 were rural and 307,456 were urban. Scheduled Castes and Scheduled Tribes made up 456,706 (30.62%) and 382,112 (25.62%) of the population respectively.

=== Religion ===
Religion in Alipurduar district (2011)
Hinduism	80.07%
Islam	8.74%
Christianity	7.52%
Buddhism	2.37%
Tribal religion	1.00%
Other or not stated	0.31%

Religion in present-day Alipurduar district
Religion	Population (1941)	Percentage (1941)	Population (2011)	Percentage (2011)
Hinduism	144,898	45.17%	1,194,102	80.07%
Tribal religion	141,716	44.17%	14,866	1.00%
Islam	29,856	9.31%	130,339	8.74%
Christianity	1,385	0.43%	112,091	7.52%
Buddhism	---	---	35,318	2.37%
Others (Note: Including Jainism, Buddhism, Zoroastrianism, Judaism, Ad-Dharmis, or not stated.)	2,963	0.93	4,534	0.31%
Total Population	320,818	100%	1,491,250	100%

Hindus are the majority in all blocks. Muslims are spread evenly throughout the district, but Christians, traditional religions and Buddhists are concentrated in the tea garden areas.

=== Language ===
Languages of Alipurduar district (2011)
1. Bengali (53.9%)
2. Sadri (16.8%)
3. Nepali (9.70%)
4. Hindi (3.67%)
5. Rajbongshi (3.17%)
6. Kurukh (3.13%)
7. Boro (2.38%)
8. Bhojpuri (1.39%)
9. Santali (1.32%)
10. Rabha (1.23%)
11. Others (3.28%)

At the time of the 2011 census, 53.93% spoke Bengali, 16.80% Sadri, 9.70% Nepali, 3.67% Hindi, 3.17% Rajbongshi, 3.13% Kurukh, 2.38% Boro, 1.39% Bhojpuri, 1.32% Santali and 1.23% Rabha as their first language. The remaining 3.28% spoke other languages.

== Visitor attractions ==
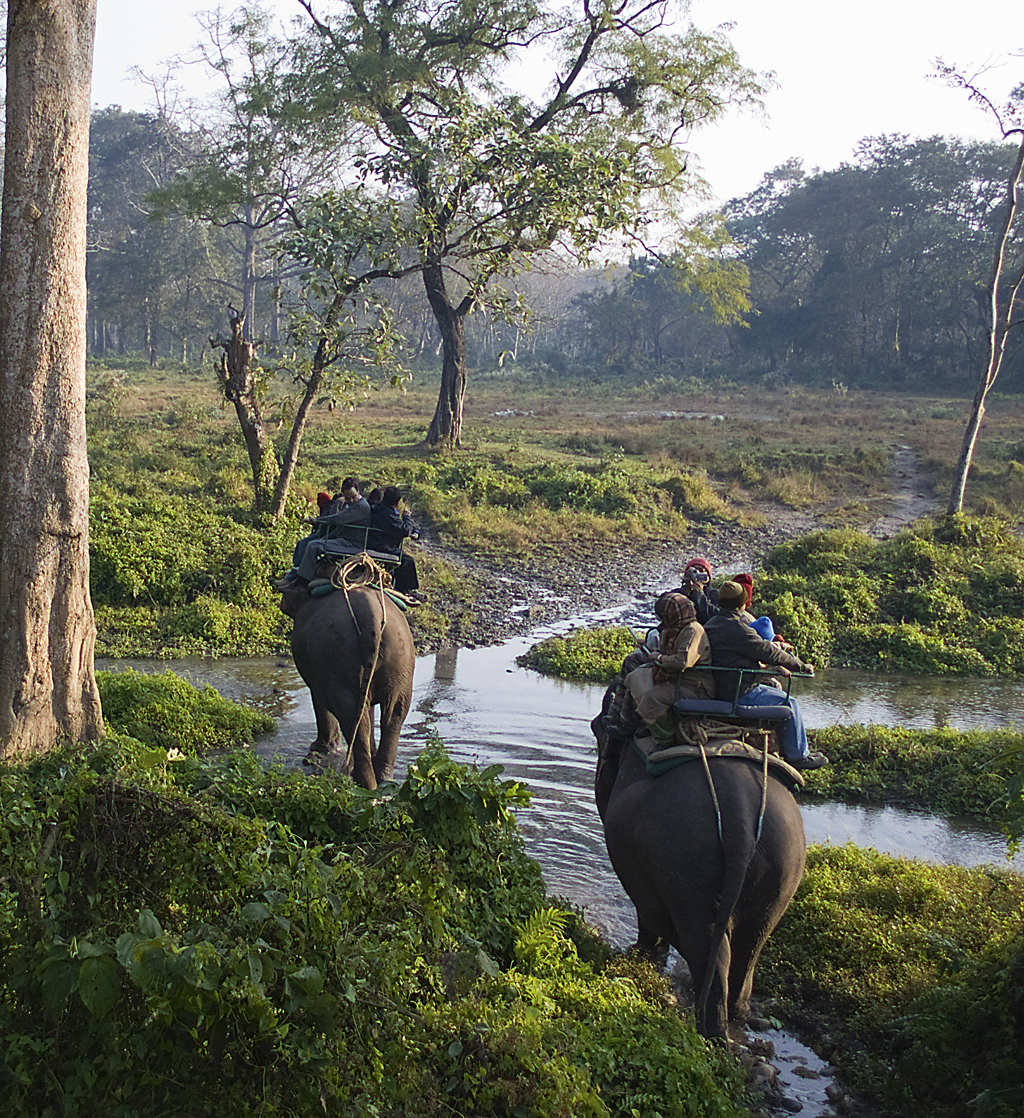
An elephant safari through the Jaldapara Sanctuary

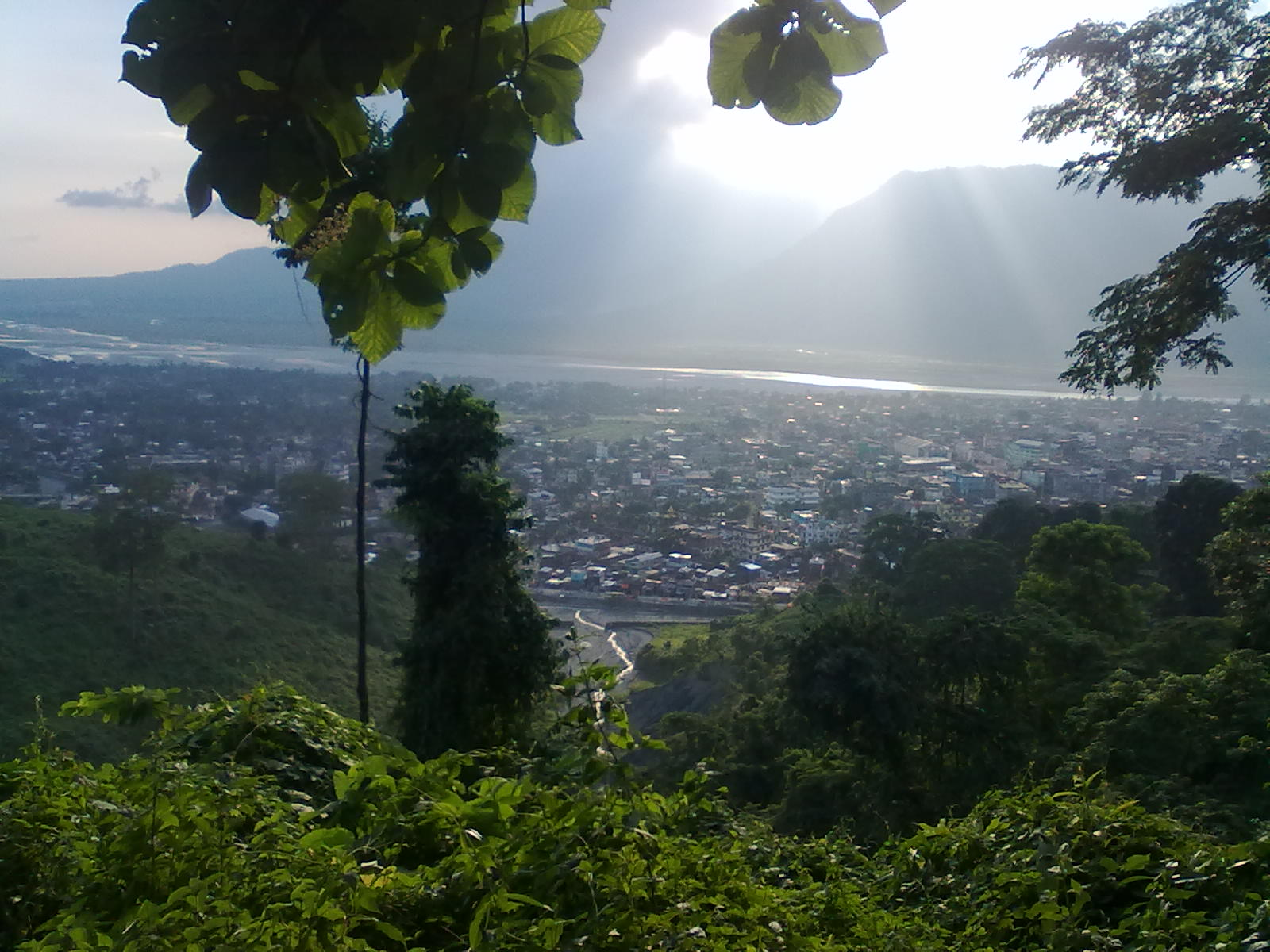
Hill Down View of Jaigaon

- Buxa Tiger Reserve, IUCN category II national park
- Jayanti Hills
- Buxa Fort, built by British Raj
- Jaldapara National Park
- Chilapata Forests
- Jaigaon, a small town of Alipurduar district and near the Bhutan border
- Rajabhatkhawa Museum at Rajabhatkhawa
- Rajabhatkhawa Forest
- Raimatang
- Jayanti
- Santalabari
- Rovers point
- Roopang valley
- Lepchakha
- Chunabhati
- Chipra Forest
- Chilapata Forest
- Buxa Tiger Reserve
- Dima Bridge
- Vistadome Ride
- Tons of Tea Estates
- Kodalbasti
- Shilbarihat
- Nilpara
- Nimati

== Geographical indication ==
Kalonunia rice was awarded the Geographical Indication (GI) status tag from the Geographical Indications Registry under the Union Government of India on 02/01/2024 (valid until 11/03/2034). It is a common and widely cultivated crop in districts of Cooch Behar, Jalpaiguri and Alipurduar along with some parts of Darjeeling & Kalimpong districts of West Bengal.

State Agricultural Management & Extension Training Institute (SAMETI) from Narendrapur, proposed the GI registration of Kalonunia rice. After filing the application in March 2021, the rice was granted the GI tag in 2024 by the Geographical Indication Registry in Chennai, making the name "Kalonunia rice" exclusive to the rice grown in the region. It thus became the third rice variety from West Bengal after Tulaipanji rice and the 26th type of goods from West Bengal to earn the GI tag.

The GI tag protects the rice from illegal selling and marketing, and gives it legal protection and a unique identity.

== Bibliography ==
- Das, Smriti (1998). Assam Bhutan relations with special reference to duars from 1681 to 1949 (PhD). Guwahati University. hdl:10603/67909. Archived from the original on 16 March 2023.
