= Siliguri =

City in West Bengal, India

Siliguri Shiliguri
- City
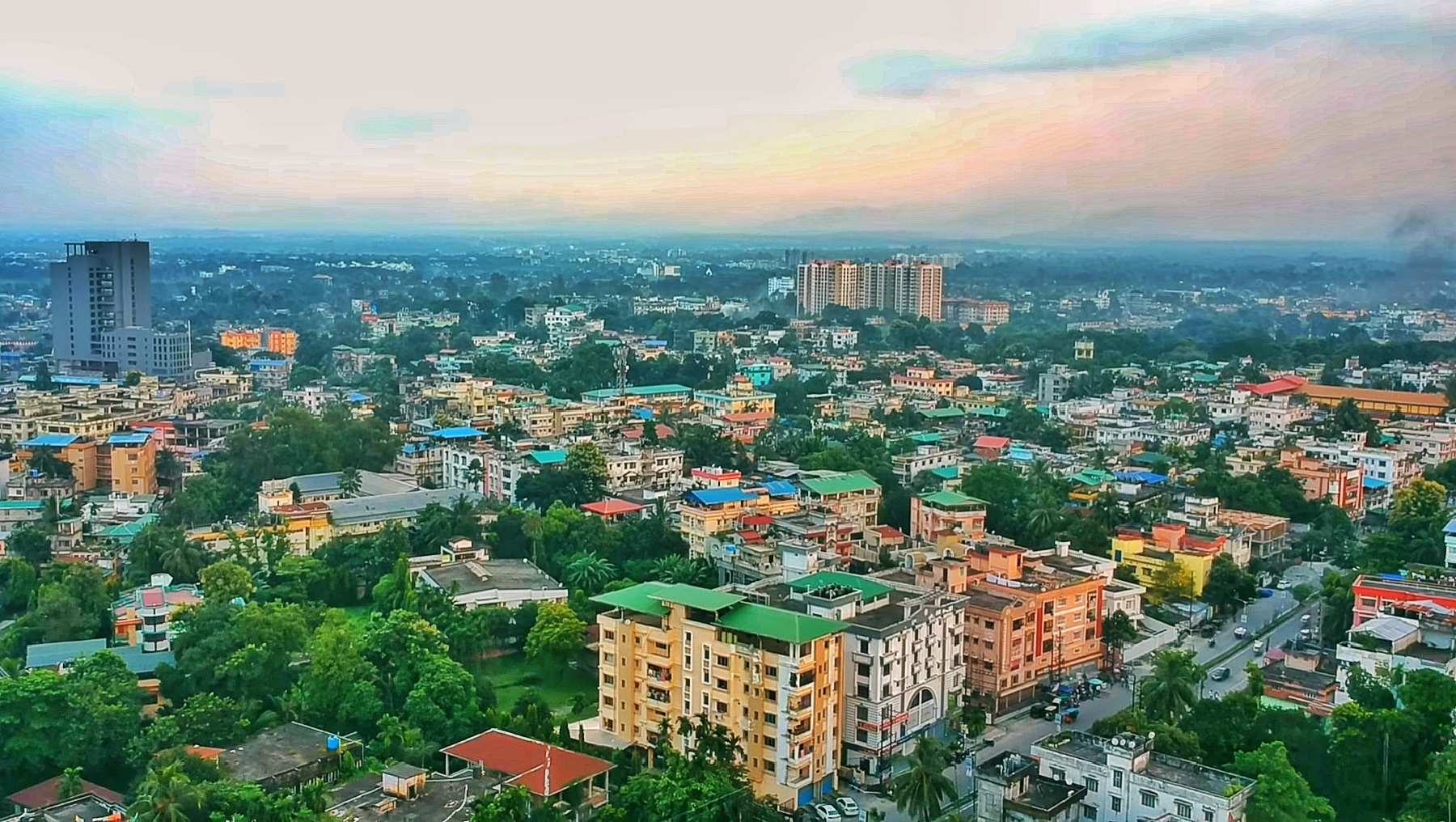
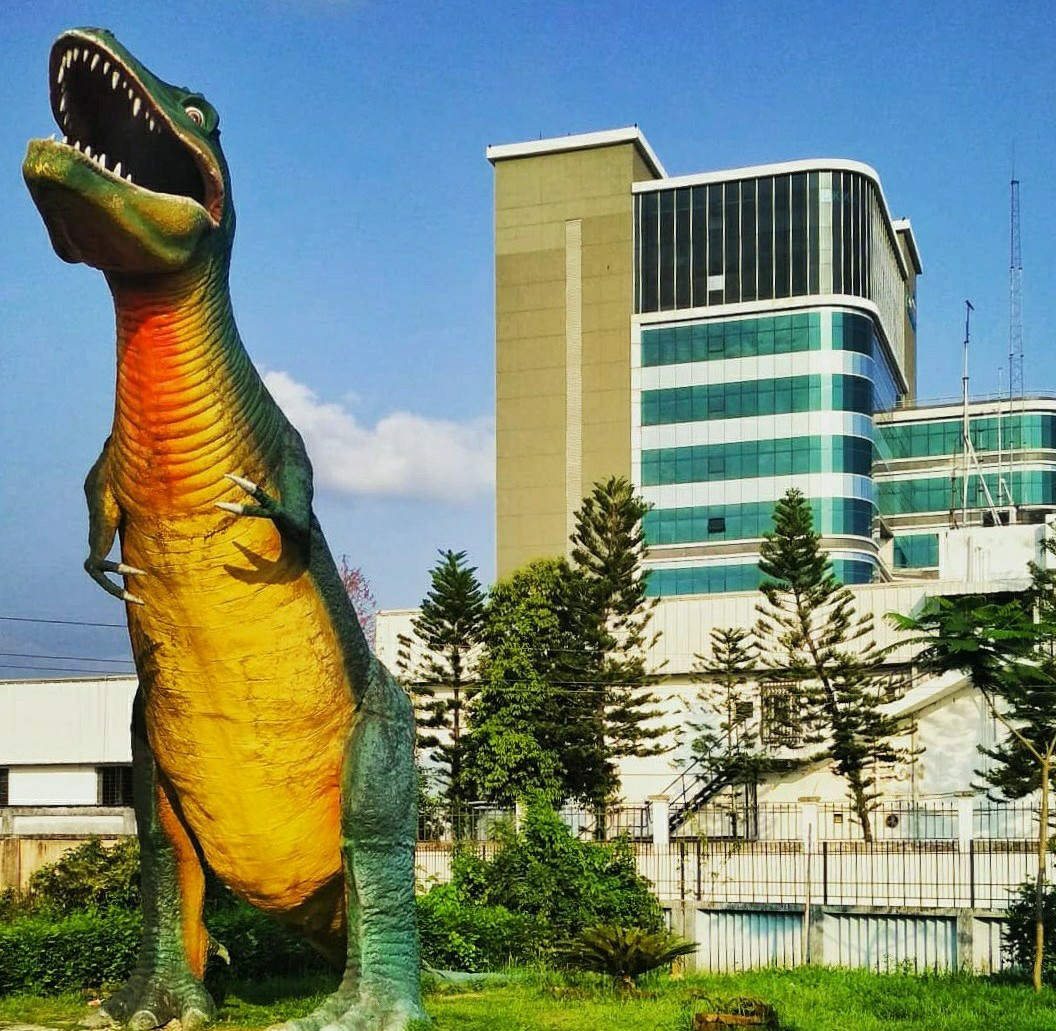
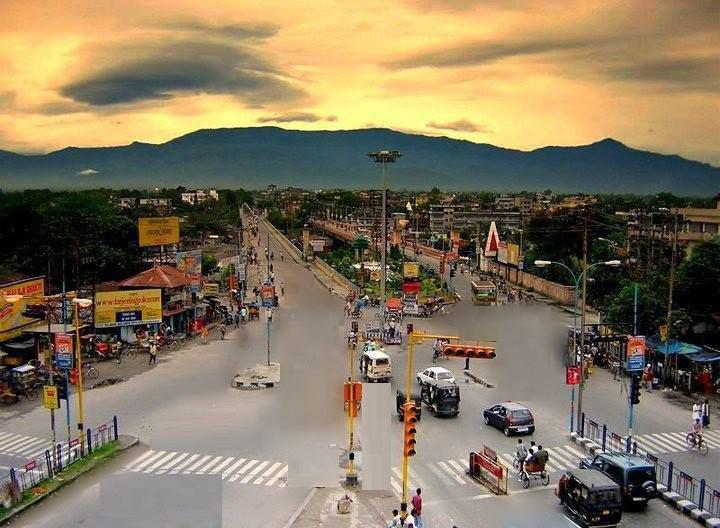
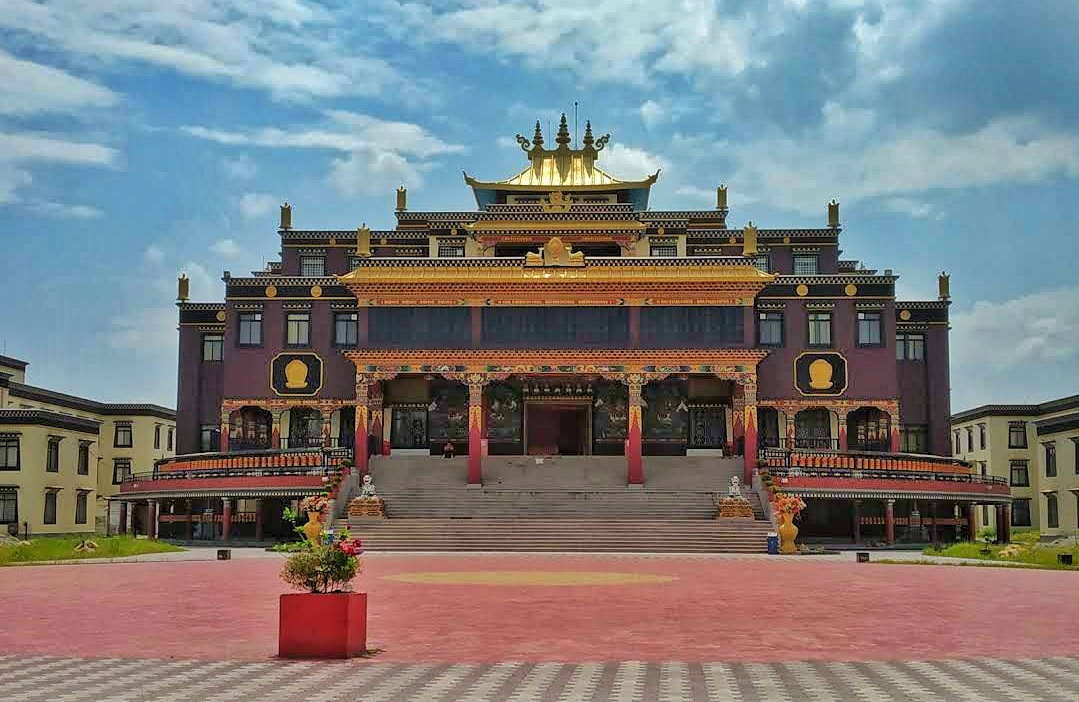
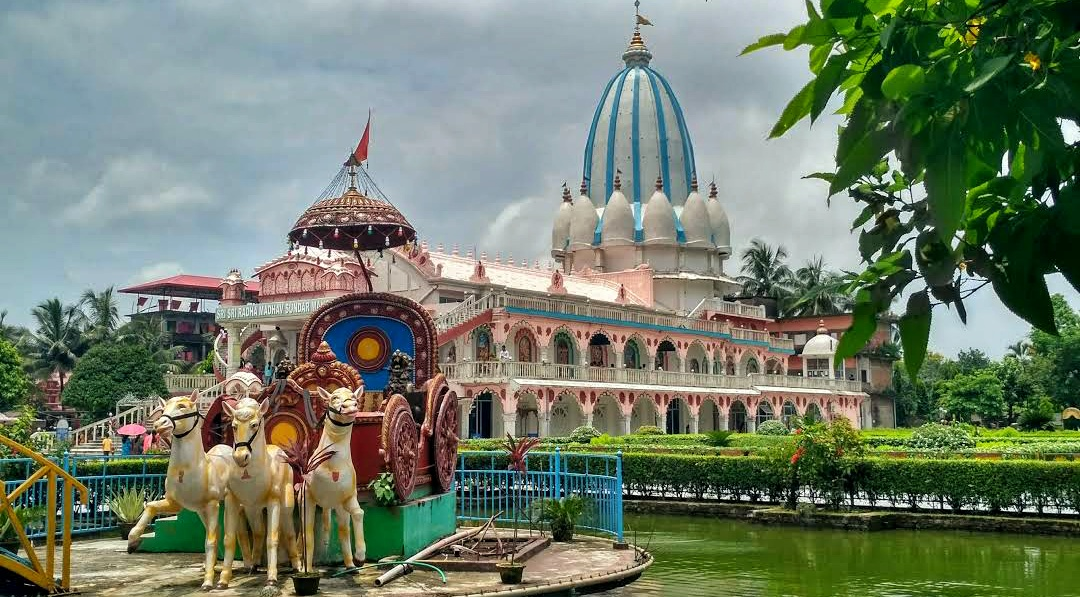
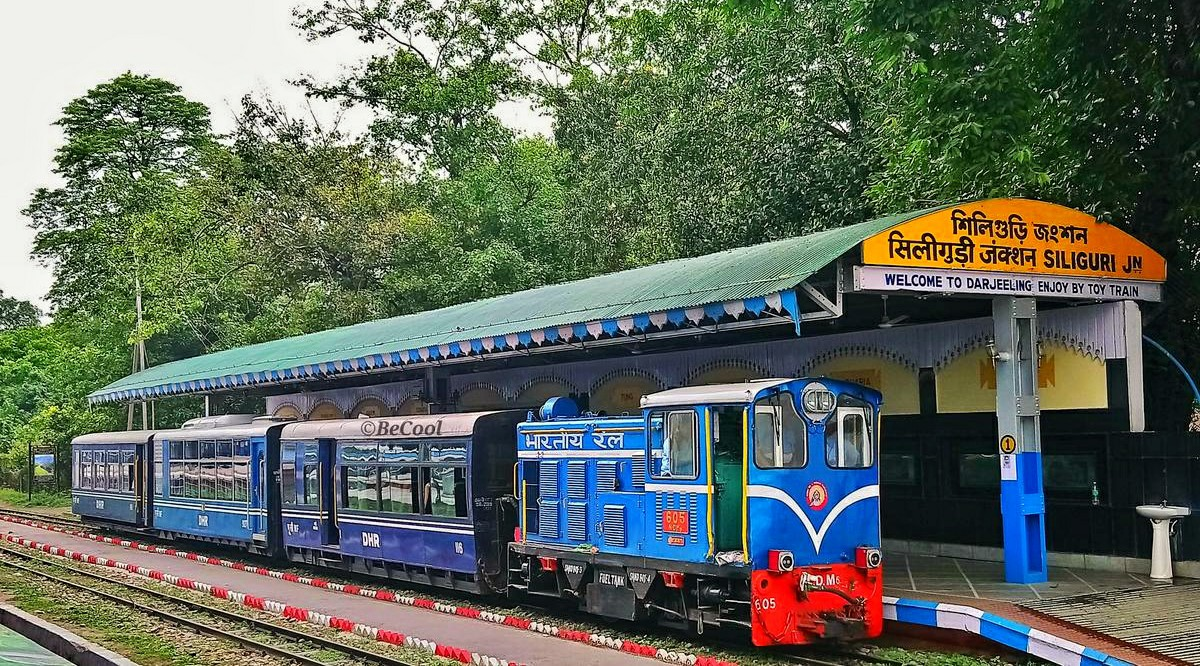
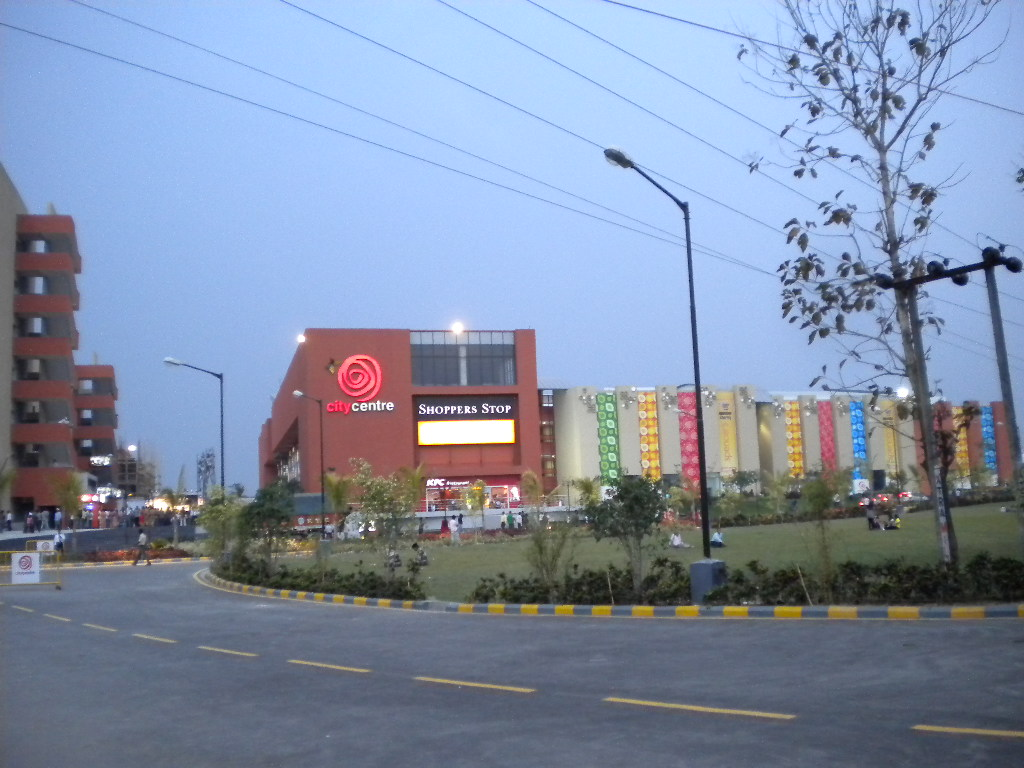
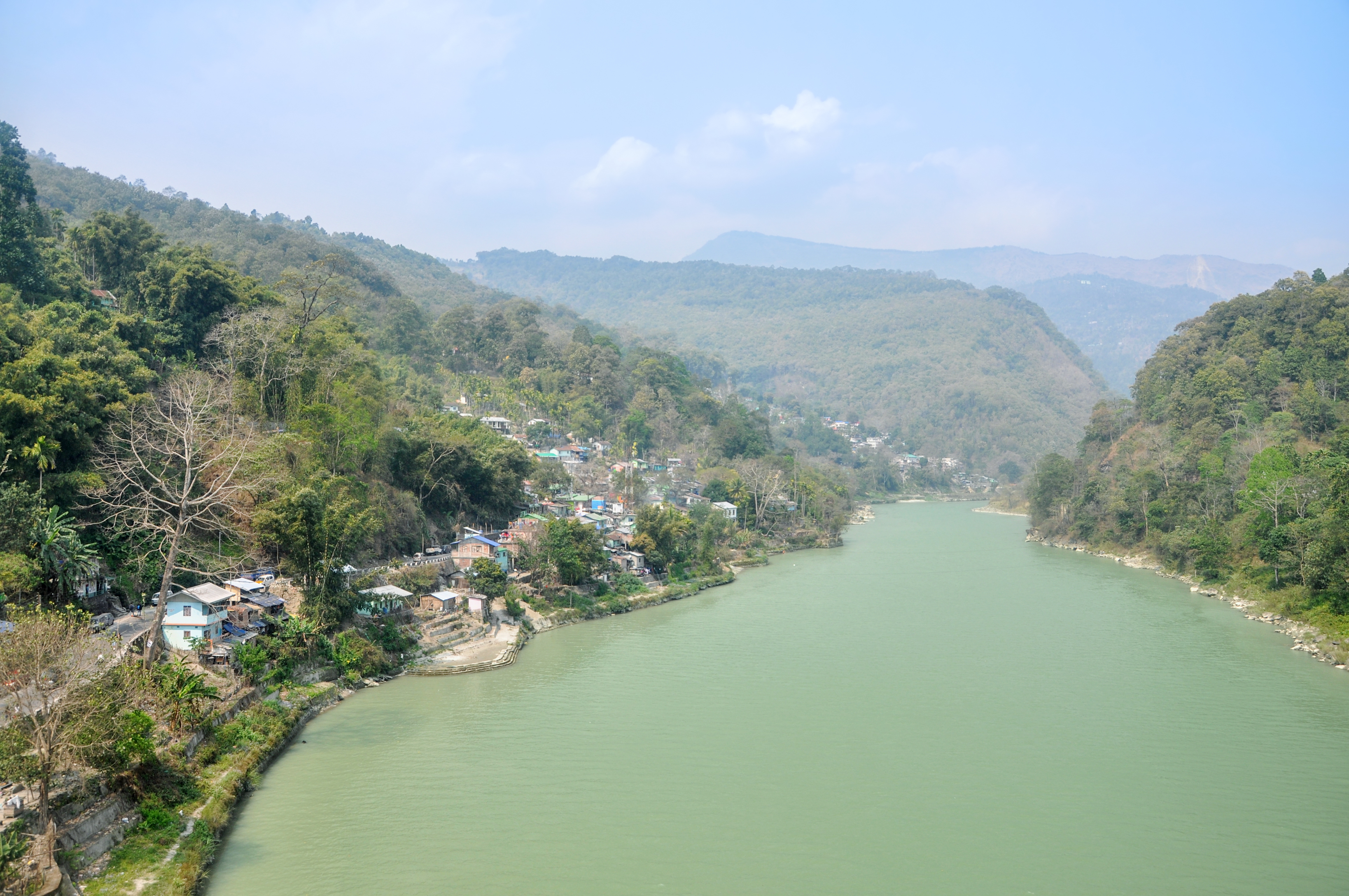
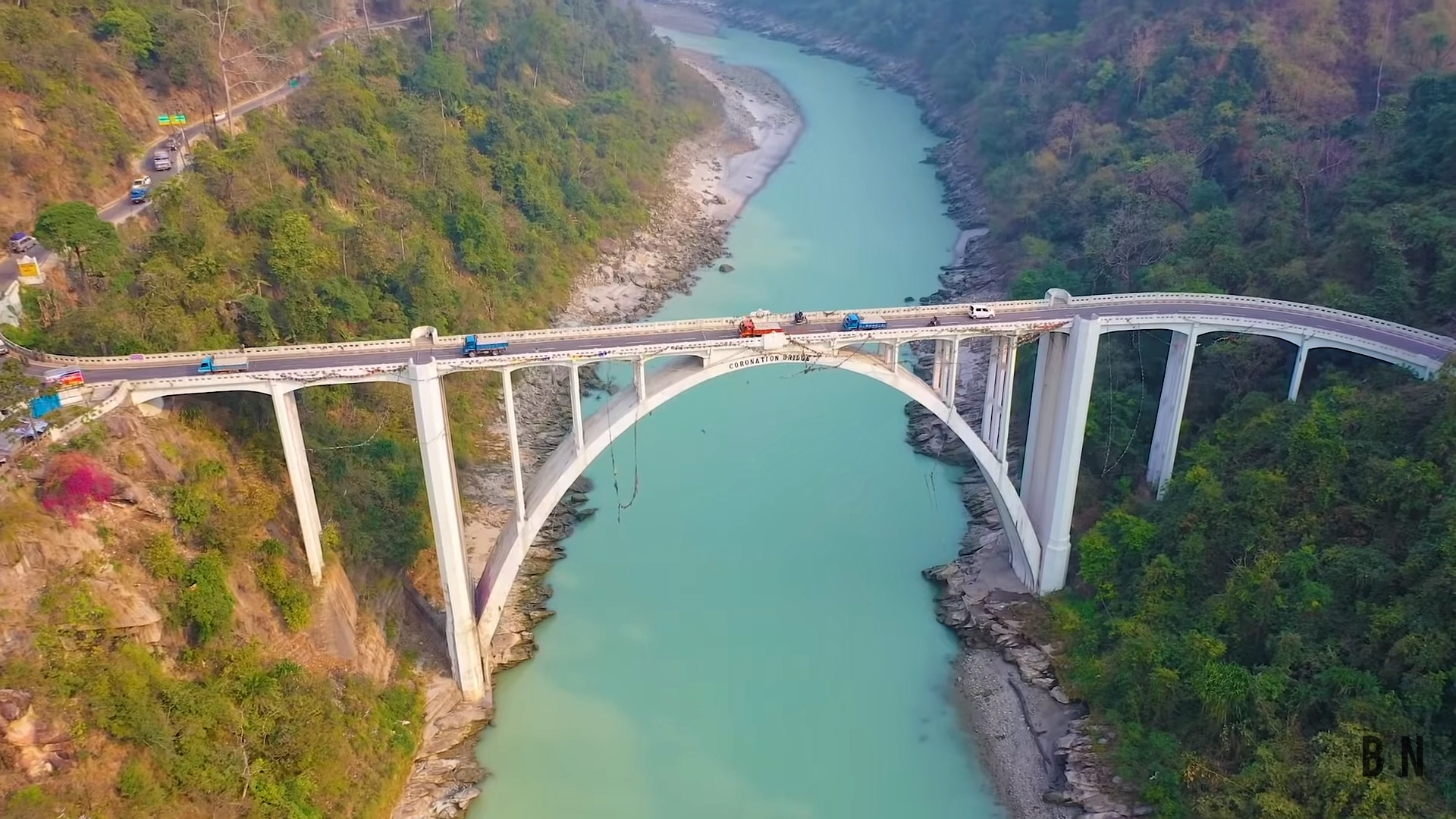
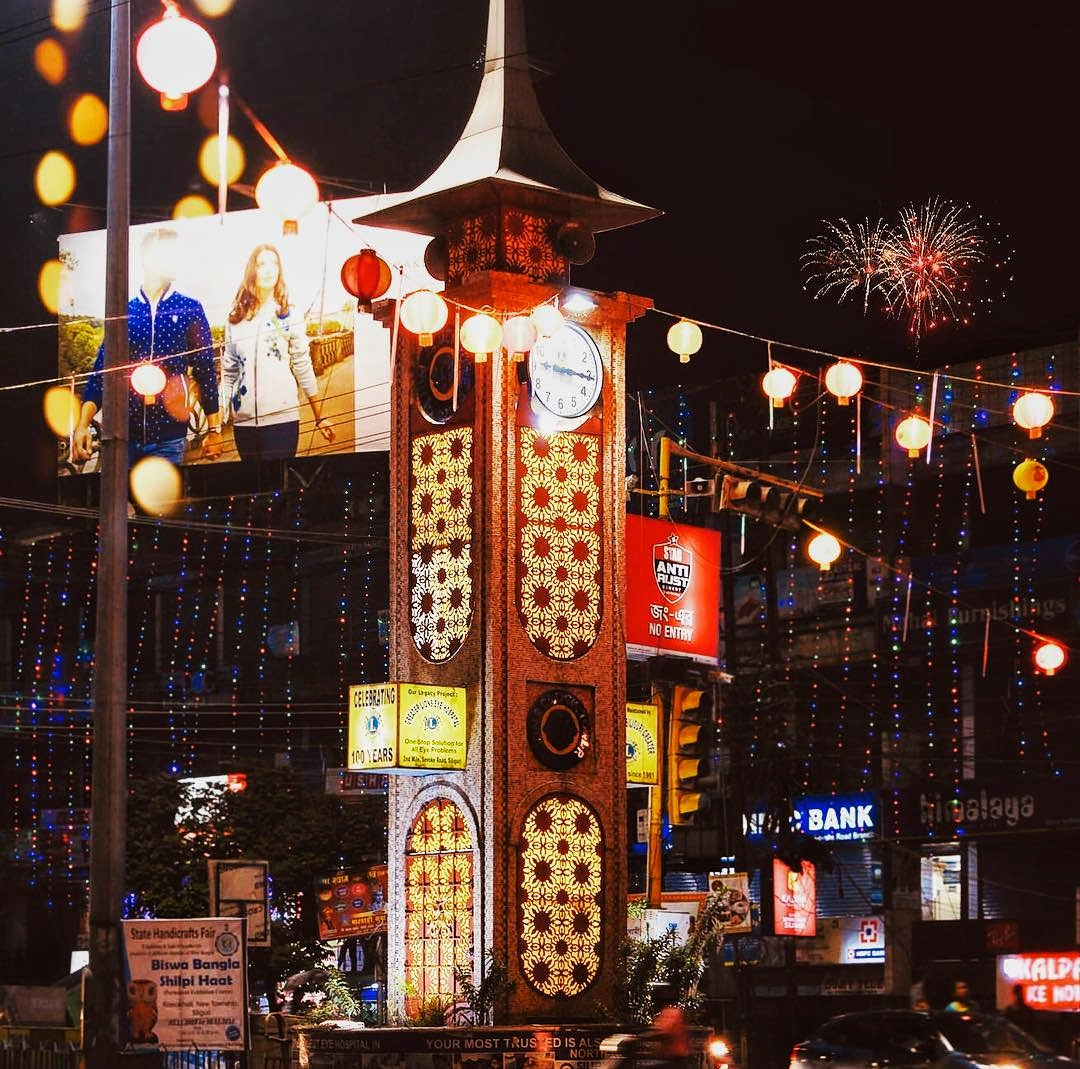
- Clockwise from top left: Siliguri aerial view, Science Centre entrance, Ewam India Monastery, Toy Train in Siliguri, Teesta River, Lions Clock Tower, Sevoke Roadway Bridge, Siliguri City Centre, ISKCON Temple, Siliguri traffic
- Nicknames: Gateway to the Dooars, Gateway of Northeast India, City of Hospitality
- Location in West Bengal Location in India
- Coordinates: 26.71°N 88.43°E^{[1]}
- Country: India
- State: West Bengal
- District: Darjeeling (62%), Jalpaiguri (38%)
- No. of Wards: 47
- Established: 1994

Government
  - Type: Municipal corporation
  - Body: Siliguri Municipal Corporation
  - Mayor: Goutam Deb
  - Deputy mayor: Ranjan Sarkar
  - Police Commissioner: Syed Waquar Raza, IPS
  - Sub Divisional officer: Priyanka Singh, IAS

Area
  - Urban: 117 km^{2} (45 sq mi)
  - Metro: 2,222 km^{2} (858 sq mi)
  - Rank: 3rd in West Bengal
- Highest elevation: 140 m (460 ft)
- Lowest elevation: 114 m (374 ft)

Population (2011)
  - City: 513,264
  - Rank: 3rd in West Bengal
  - Urban: 701,489
  - City rank: 89th in India

Languages
  - Official: Bengali
  - Additional official: English
- Time zone: UTC+5:30 (IST)
- PIN: 734 001-734 015 (city limits), 734 401-734 436(suburbs), 735 133-735 135
- Telephone code: 0353, 0354
- Vehicle registration: WB 73/74^{[2]}
- Lok Sabha constituency: Darjeeling, Jalpaiguri
- Literacy: 85.46%
- Sex ratio: 1000♂/951♀
- Vidhan Sabha constituency: Siliguri, Dabgram-Phulbari, Matigara-Naxalbari, Phansidewa
- Police: Siliguri Police Commissionerate
- Website: www.siligurismc.in, www.siliguri.gov.in
- ^{[1]}The coordinates given here are in metric system and based upon the Microsoft Encarta Reference Library Map Center 2005. ^{[2]}The Vehicle Code given here is based upon the Siliguri Sub-Divisional Court, Darjeeling District Court and Jalpaiguri District Court documentations.

Siliguri (/sɪˈliˌɡʊri/, Bengali pronunciation: [ʃiliɡuɽi];), also known as Shiliguri, is a major tier-II city in West Bengal. It forms the Twin Cities with the neighbouring city of Jalpaiguri. The city spans areas of the Darjeeling and Jalpaiguri districts in the Indian state of West Bengal. Known as the "Gateway of Northeast India", It is located on the banks of the Mahananda in the foothills of the Himalayas. Siliguri is the third largest urban agglomeration in West Bengal, after Kolkata and Asansol.

Siliguri has great strategic importance in West Bengal, with convenient access to three international borders: Nepal, Bangladesh and Bhutan. It also connects the North-East with mainland India. Located in the foothills of Eastern Himalayas, Siliguri is a significant trading and transportation hub.

== History ==
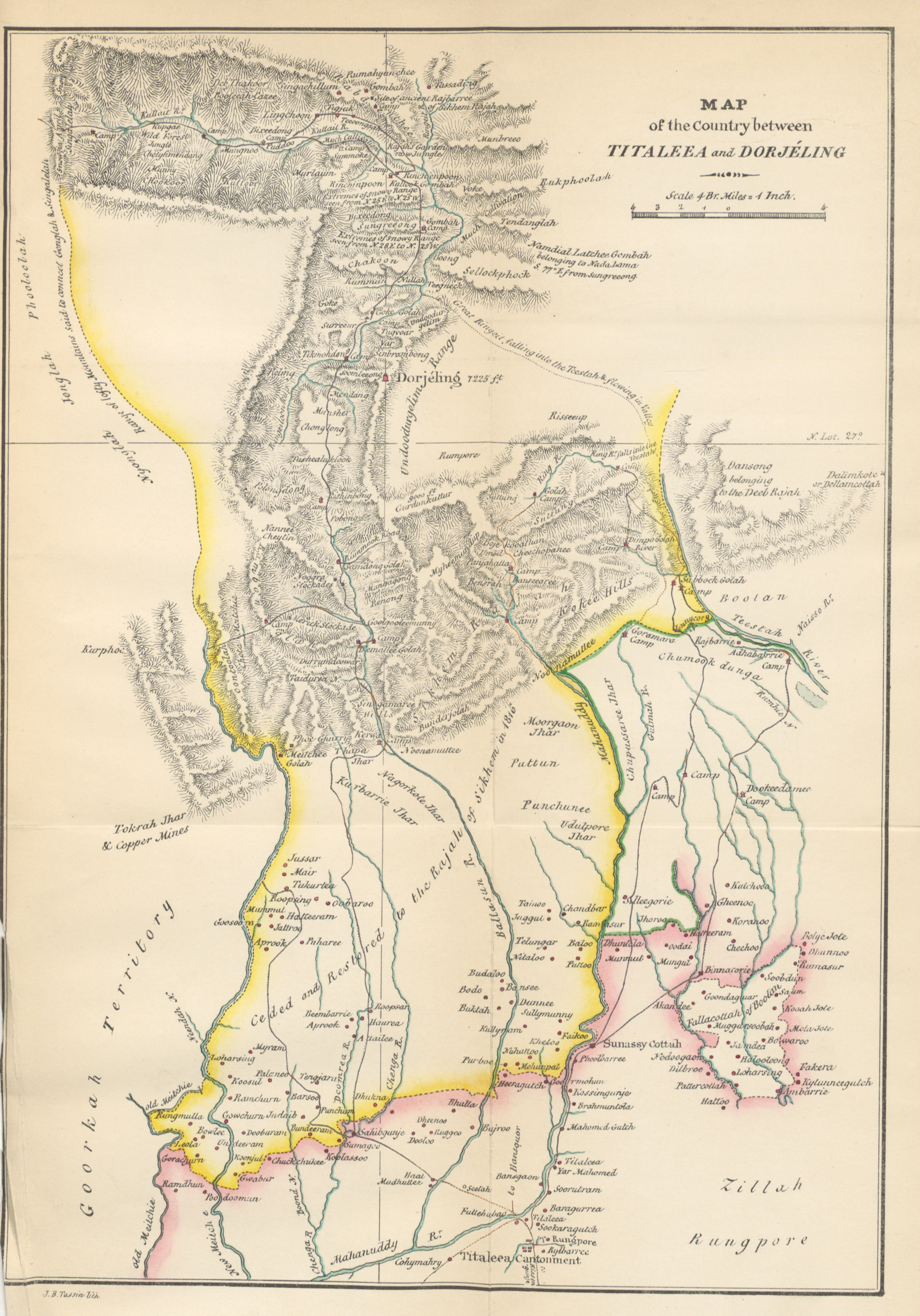
Map of Darjeeling district (1838) during regime of Rajah of Sikkim

=== Etymology ===
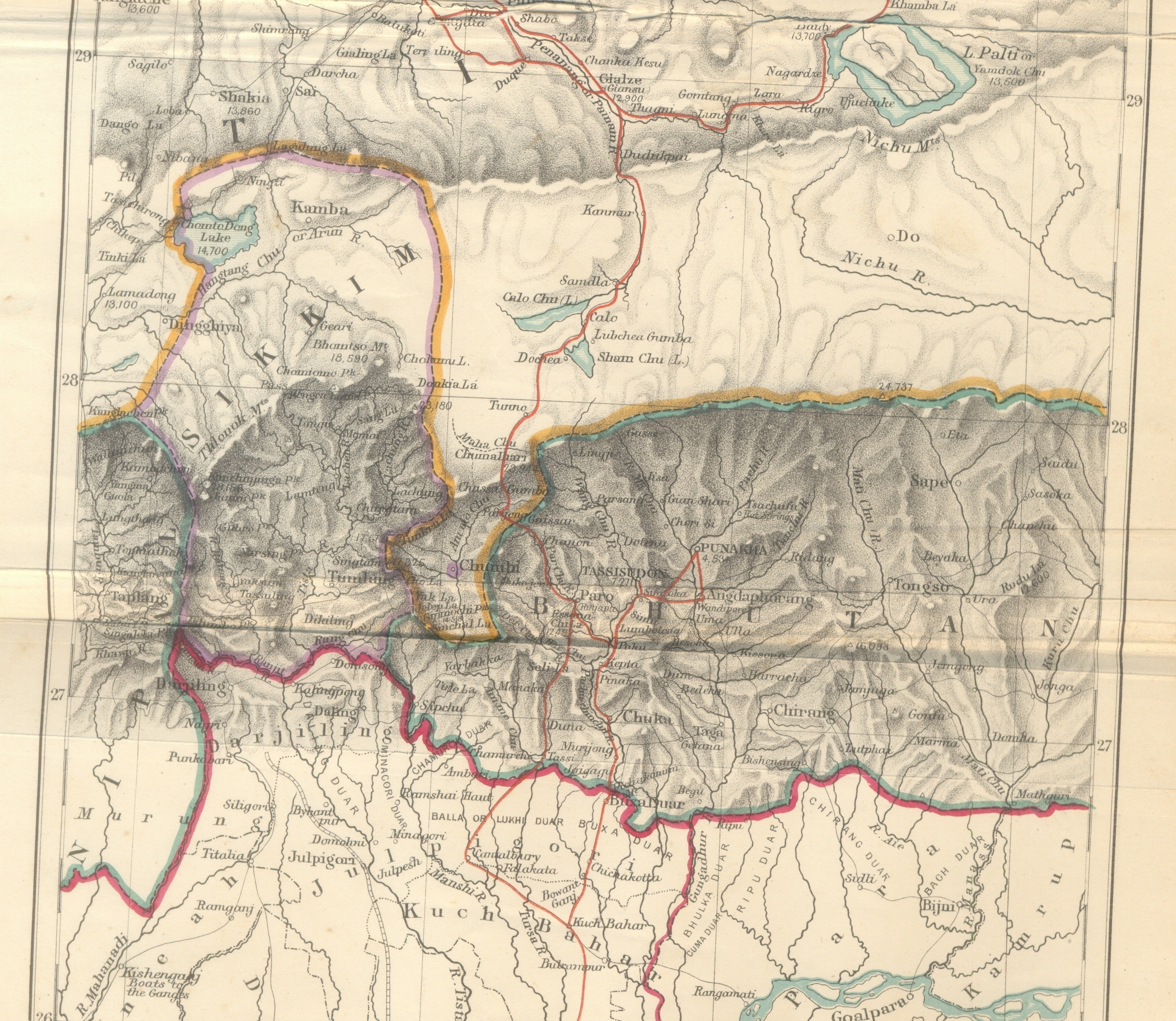
Map of Darjeeling district (1876) after being considered a "regulated area" by the British government

According to Sailen Debnath, "Siliguri" means a stack of pebbles or stones. Until the 19th century this region was called as "Shilchaguri" when there was dense Dolka forest covering the region.

Sir William Wilson Hunter in his work A Statistical Account of Bengal, mentioned the name of this place as "Sannyasikata".

=== Modern history ===
Siliguri was a small agricultural village in the Kingdom of Sikkim. It was captured by the Kingdom of Nepal in 1788, after which Kirati and Lepchas came to settle in this region.

At that time a river port on Mahananda, South of Siliguri in Phansidewa had an important role in having trade bond with Malda, Bengal and Bihar. This riverine trade line was thus used by the Bhutanese and Sikkimese to bring goods into their mainland.

Siliguri started as a small area in the northern part of city, on the front of Mahananda River, which is now Dagapur. The Treaty of Sugauli in 1816, signed between Britain-Nepal, changed the prospects of Siliguri, and it became a point of transit for the Darjeeling hills and Nepal mainland. From 1816 onwards, Siliguri started growing rapidly as a small city due to its strategic location in trade routes. In 1865, the British captured Darjeeling and the entire Dooars region to build tea plantations and export the produce to England. To scale up exportation they introduced the Siliguri Town railway station which stands to this day, and introduced the Toy train from the station to Darjeeling in 1880. This helped Siliguri gain sub-divisional town status in 1907.

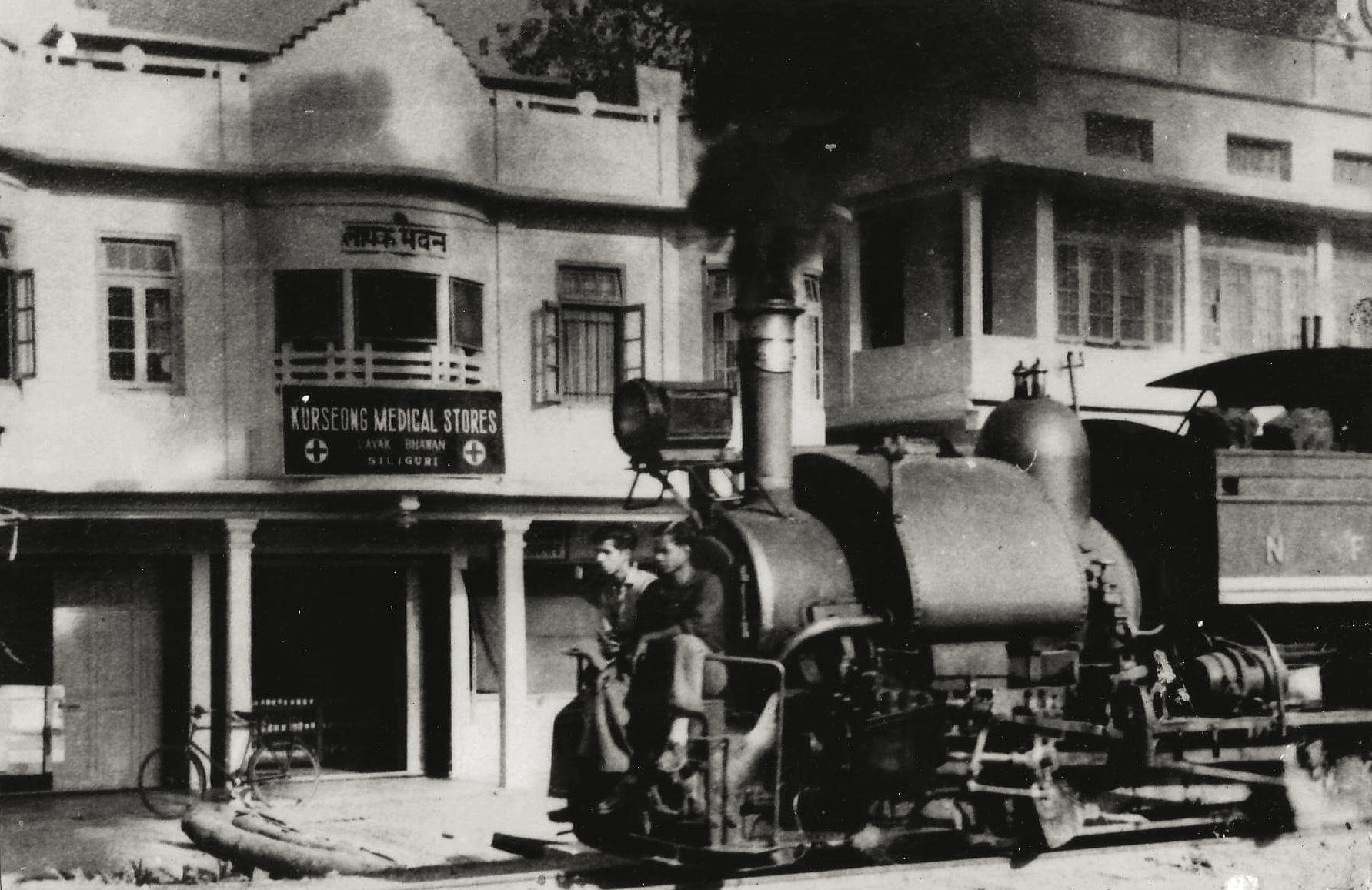
Toy train passing through Siliguri after independence, in 1955

The Siliguri Corridor was formed when Bengal was divided into West Bengal and East Pakistan (later Bangladesh) in 1947, with Sikkim later merging with India in 1975. At this point many immigrants came to settle here for better infrastructure, which led to an increased population. Later in 1950 Siliguri achieved municipal status. Keeping in mind the importance of Siliguri, in 1951, the Assam rail link was established with newly made (1949) Meter gauge Siliguri Junction railway station. After few years in 1961 all these stations were connected with broad gauge New Jalpaiguri Junction railway station which later became the most important railway station in Northeast India.

Due to tremendous growth, Siliguri is now far away from its past outlook, becoming the largest and fastest growing city in eastern India after Guwahati. The growth rate of Siliguri was 57.8% during 1971- 1981. Considering this growth, Siliguri came under the Integrated Urban Development Project program in 1981. Siliguri population growth rate rose to 46.8% of 1981–1991. A treaty between India and China for trade through Nathu La Pass, has expedited development and prospects of Siliguri as an international transportation and logistics hub. Later in 1994 Siliguri built a Municipal corporation which has been responsible for the civic infrastructure and administration of the city of Siliguri. Siliguri has now achieved the status of becoming the third-largest city in West Bengal, after Kolkata and Asansol.

== Geography ==
=== Location ===
Siliguri is located at the foothills of the eastern Himalayas at a location of 26.71°N 88.43°E. The city is spread over an area of 260 km^{2} (100 sq mi) within the Siliguri Corridor. The city is bordered by dense forests to the north and the Mahananda River flows through the city, thereby bisecting it into two halves, while the Teesta River flows on its eastern border. Siliguri has an average elevation of 122 metres (400 feet). As Siliguri is located in the Terai region, the soil is sandy in nature with the ratio of sand and silt much higher than clay. This region is very prone to earthquakes as there are several fault lines nearby. The Siliguri subdivision is bordered by Himalayan ranges to its north, Bangladesh to the south-east, Uttar Dinajpur district of West Bengal to the south and the Indian state of Bihar to the south-west. To the east lies Jalpaiguri district, north-east the Kalimpong district, and Nepal to the west.

=== Climate ===
Siliguri has a humid subtropical climate (Köppen: Cwa). Hot, humid summers, pleasant to warm winters and a severe monsoon define Siliguri's climate.

==== Temperature ====
The average annual temperature in Siliguri is 23.2 °C or 73.8 °F. In summer, the temperature varies from a minimum between 20 and 24 °C (68 and 75 °F) to a maximum between 29 and 35 °C (84 and 95 °F). The temperature of the hottest month, August, is 27.1 °C or 80.8 °F, and temperatures in peak summer sometimes exceeds 38 °C or 100 °F.

On the other hand, the winter maximum temperature hovers around 20 to 25 °C (68 to 77 °F), and the minimum drops to between 6 and 9 °C (43 and 48 °F). January is the coolest month with an average temperature of 16.4 °C or 61.5 °F. The minimum temperature in winter season sometimes drops to or below 5 °C or 41 °F. The highest temperature ever recorded in Siliguri was 41.9 °C or 107.4 °F on 7 June 2023, while the lowest was 1.9 °C or 35.4 °F, recorded on 8 January 2018.

==== Rainfall and other conditions ====
On average, Siliguri gets more than 3,000 millimetres or 120 inches of rainfall annually. Winters are mostly dry, with the summers being rainy. About eighty per cent of the annual rainfall occurs during the monsoon or rainy season between June and September. Heavy showers are often felt in May, June, July, August and September. July is the wettest month (804 millimetres or 32 inches) and January the driest (12 millimetres or 0.47 inches). The average rainy days in July is 27 and for December and January it is 1. Humidity is high throughout the year.

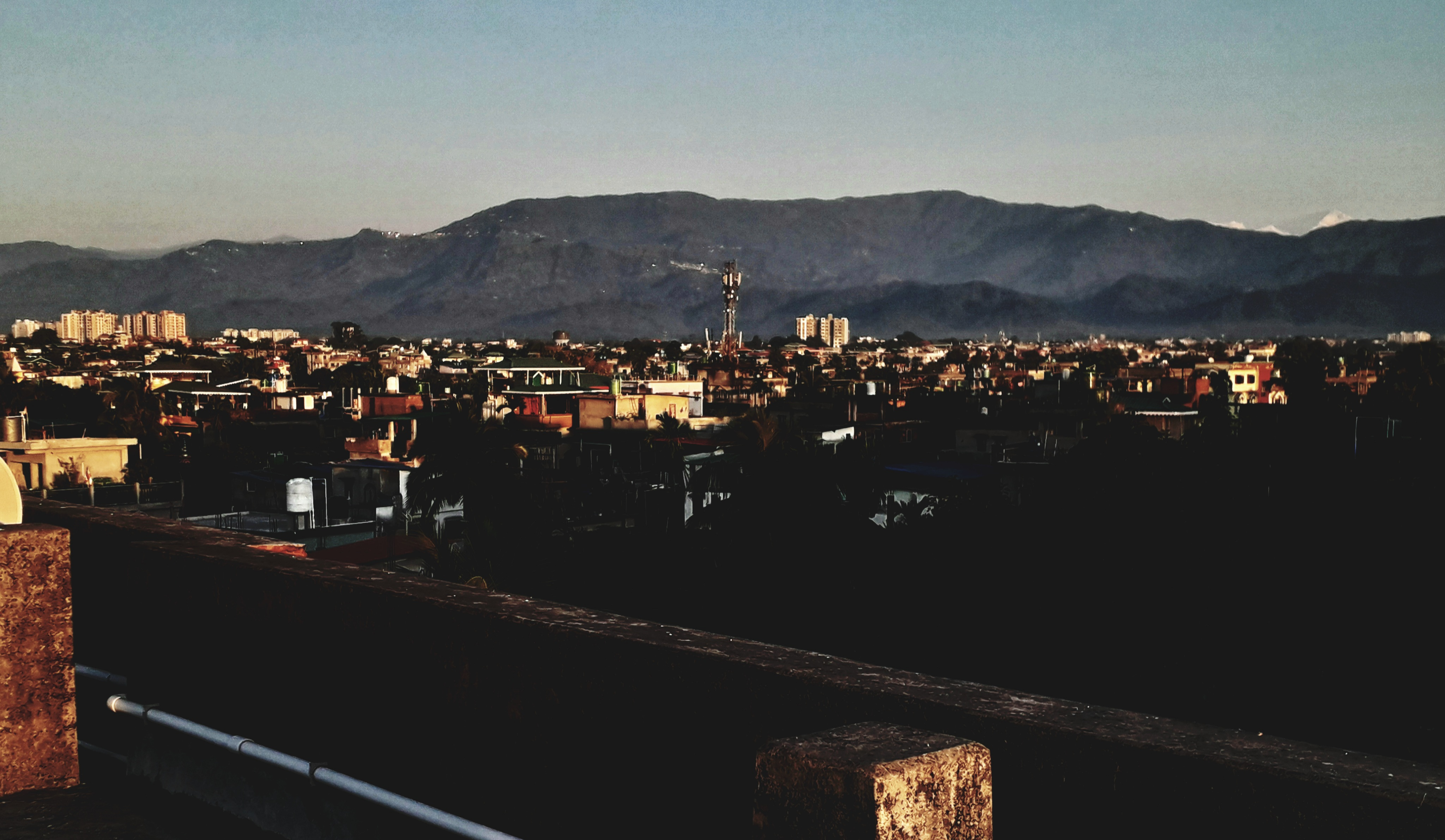
The Himalayas visible on a clear November morning

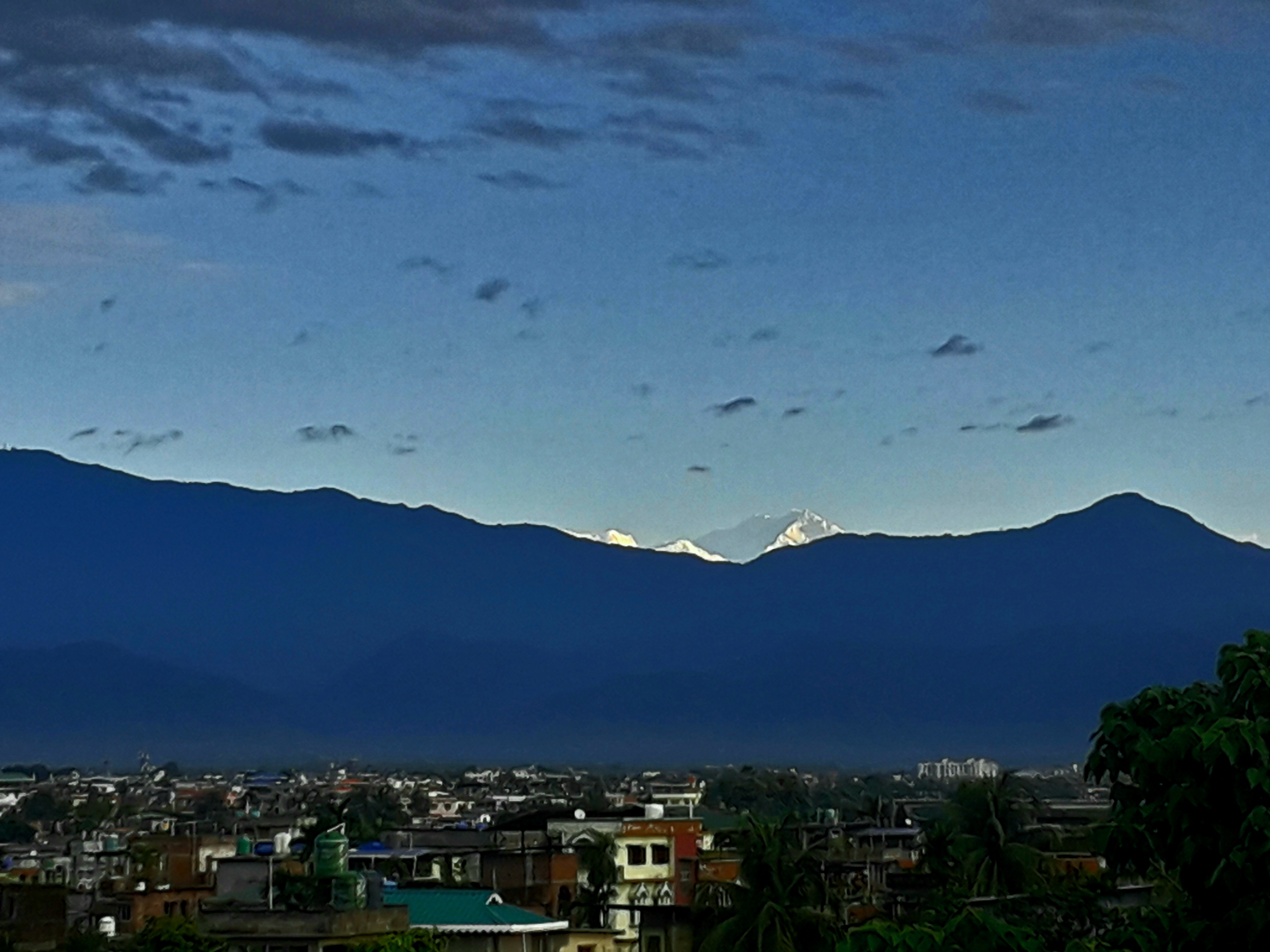
Kangchenjunga visible on an early August morning from Siliguri

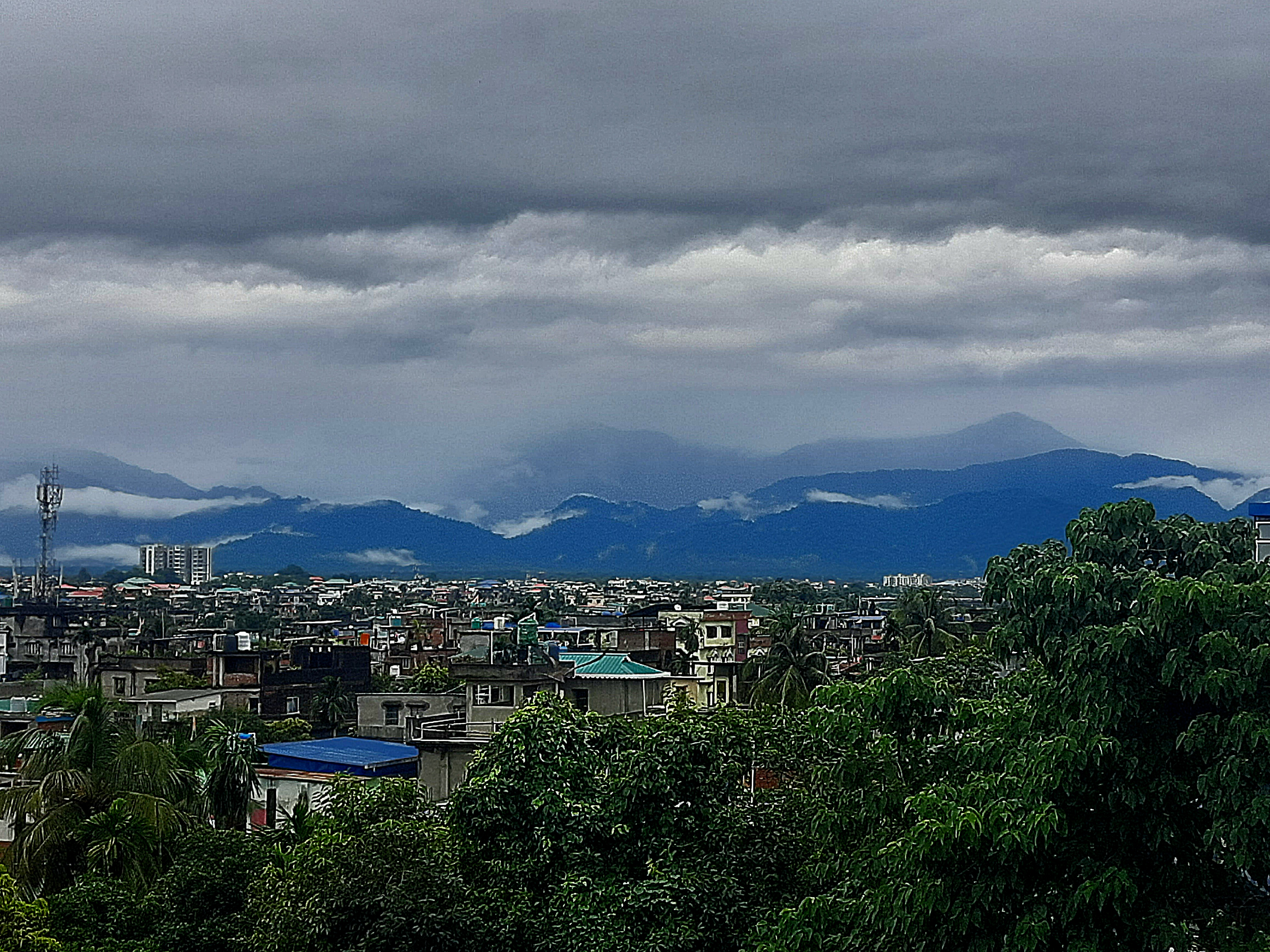
Siliguri during the Monsoon season (Sep 2024)

Climate data for Siliguri (Bagdogra Airport), 1991–2020 normals, extremes 1951–present
| Month | Jan | Feb | Mar | Apr | May | Jun | Jul | Aug | Sep | Oct | Nov | Dec | Year |
|---|---|---|---|---|---|---|---|---|---|---|---|---|---|
| Record high °C (°F) | 32.5 (90.5) | 33.2 (91.8) | 38.1 (100.6) | 41.7 (107.1) | 40.8 (105.4) | 41.9 (107.4) | 40.4 (104.7) | 40.0 (104.0) | 40.1 (104.2) | 36.6 (97.9) | 33.8 (92.8) | 32.6 (90.7) | 41.9 (107.4) |
| Mean maximum °C (°F) | 25.6 (78.1) | 27.9 (82.2) | 32.8 (91.0) | 34.9 (94.8) | 35.3 (95.5) | 36.3 (97.3) | 36.0 (96.8) | 36.7 (98.1) | 35.8 (96.4) | 33.5 (92.3) | 30.4 (86.7) | 27.2 (81.0) | 37.0 (98.6) |
| Mean daily maximum °C (°F) | 22.0 (71.6) | 24.5 (76.1) | 29.3 (84.7) | 30.8 (87.4) | 29.9 (85.8) | 29.5 (85.1) | 29.1 (84.4) | 29.6 (85.3) | 29.2 (84.6) | 28.5 (83.3) | 26.3 (79.3) | 23.4 (74.1) | 27.7 (81.8) |
| Mean daily minimum °C (°F) | 10.7 (51.3) | 12.8 (55.0) | 16.1 (61.0) | 19.5 (67.1) | 22.1 (71.8) | 24.0 (75.2) | 24.6 (76.3) | 24.6 (76.3) | 23.5 (74.3) | 19.7 (67.5) | 15.2 (59.4) | 11.8 (53.2) | 18.7 (65.7) |
| Mean minimum °C (°F) | 6.9 (44.4) | 7.2 (45.0) | 12.5 (54.5) | 16.5 (61.7) | 18.6 (65.5) | 22.0 (71.6) | 23.4 (74.1) | 23.6 (74.5) | 21.9 (71.4) | 16.8 (62.2) | 11.9 (53.4) | 7.7 (45.9) | 6.5 (43.7) |
| Record low °C (°F) | 1.9 (35.4) | 3.5 (38.3) | 6.2 (43.2) | 9.6 (49.3) | 15.0 (59.0) | 20.0 (68.0) | 21.0 (69.8) | 18.4 (65.1) | 19.8 (67.6) | 12.3 (54.1) | 6.4 (43.5) | 2.4 (36.3) | 1.9 (35.4) |
| Average precipitation mm (inches) | 23 (0.9) | 24 (0.9) | 34 (1.3) | 76 (3.0) | 249 (9.8) | 628 (24.7) | 843 (33.2) | 589 (23.2) | 403 (15.9) | 121 (4.8) | 10 (0.4) | 11 (0.4) | 3,011 (118.5) |
| Average rainy days | 4 | 4 | 5 | 11 | 17 | 20 | 21 | 20 | 18 | 8 | 2 | 2 | 132 |
| Average relative humidity (%) | 69 | 65 | 54 | 63 | 79 | 88 | 90 | 88 | 87 | 80 | 70 | 68 | 75 |
| Average ultraviolet index | 5 | 7 | 9 | 11 | 12 | 13 | 14 | 13 | 11 | 8 | 5 | 4 | 9 |
Source 1: normal temperaturesUltraviolet Index
Source 2: Extremes(India Meteorological Department), Mean maximum and Mean minimum temperatures

== Demographics ==
Historical population
| Year | Pop. | ±% |
|---|---|---|
| 1951 | 33,000 | — |
| 1961 | 66,000 | +100.0% |
| 1971 | 100,000 | +51.5% |
| 1981 | 234,000 | +134.0% |
| 1991 | 367,000 | +56.8% |
| 2001 | 479,000 | +30.5% |
| 2011 | 701,489 | +46.4% |

Religions of Siliguri (2011)
1. Hinduism (92.0%)
2. Islam (5.37%)
3. Christianity (0.94%)
4. Buddhism (0.65%)
5. Other or no religion (1.05%)
Languages of Siliguri (2011)
1. Bengali (60.9%)
2. Hindi (25.2%)
3. Nepali (4.66%)
4. Bhojpuri (2.39%)
5. Marwari (1.58%)
6. Urdu (1.24%)
7. Others (4.01%)

Based on the Census data of 2011, the population of Siliguri UA/Metropolitan (including Siliguri municipal corporation and Dabagram municipality) is 701,489, while the population in the Municipal corporation area is 513,264. Males constitute 51.44% of the population and females 48.55%. Population shares of Scheduled Caste and Scheduled Tribe category persons in Siliguri municipal area are 8.84% and 1.25% respectively. The literacy rate in Siliguri is 77.64%. There are 154 notified and 31 non-notified slums in Siliguri, where 32% of Siliguri's population lives.

=== Languages ===
Bengali is the official language in Siliguri subdivision, including Siliguri city.

In the municipal corporation at the time of the 2011 census, 60.88% of the population spoke Bengali, 25.24% Hindi, 4.66% Nepali, 2.39% Bhojpuri, 1.58% Marwari and 1.24% Urdu as their first language.

Bengalis form the majority linguistic group in the city, followed by Biharis (including Bhojpuriyas), Marwaris, Punjabis, Nepalis, Odias, and Tribals. According to a 2001 thesis, Bengali speakers constituted 64.25% of the total population. Of the 30 wards in 2001, their population ranged from 11.71% to 98.96%.

=== Religion ===
The most common religion in Siliguri is Hinduism, with Islam being the largest minority religion, followed by small percentages of adherents to Christianity and Buddhism.

== Governance and politics ==
=== Civic administration ===
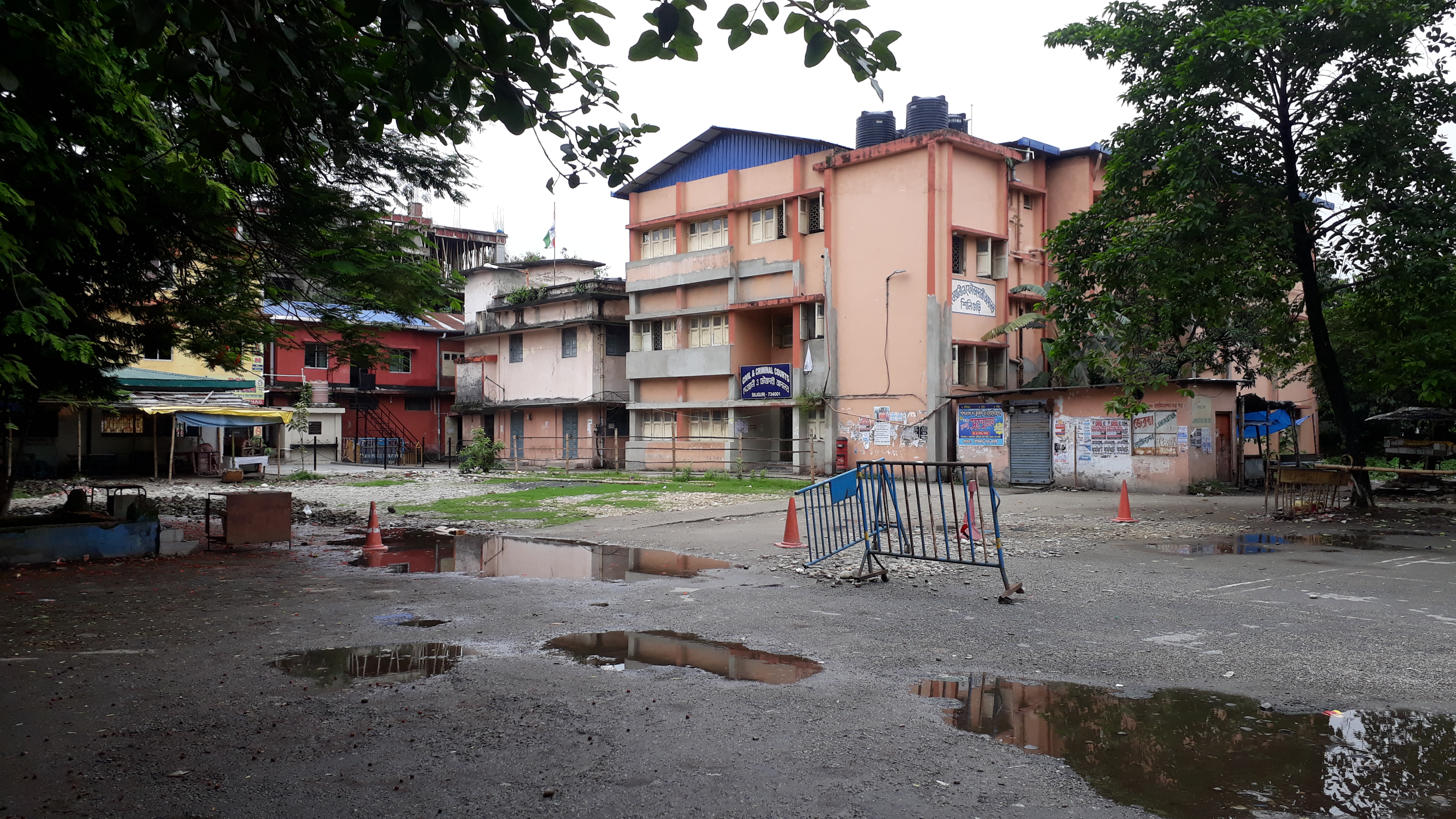
Siliguri Sub divisional Court

Siliguri saw rapid urbanisation under the British rule and that was reflected in its local governance as well. The earliest form of local urban governance was a Sanitation Committee set up in 1915. Its function was to dispose of night soil. Until 1921, most aspects of local governance in Darjeeling district, including Siliguri, were looked after by the Darjeeling Improvement Fund. In 1922, Siliguri Local Board with nominated members was created under the Bengal Local Self Government Act, 1885. In 1938, the Union Board was set up in Siliguri under the Bengal Village Self-Government Act, 1919 and it provided public utilities in the city.

The Municipal Council was set up in 1949 under the Bengal Municipal Act of 1932 with 8 wards. The first chairperson of the municipality was the Sub Divisional Officer, and the local councillors, called 'commissioners' in the then municipal act in effect, were nominated by the state government. After the amendment of the act in 1956, 3/4 of the local representatives were elected, while the remaining nominated by the Deputy Commissioner. The first elected chairperson of Siliguri was Jagdish Chandra Bhattacharya.

In 1994, the municipal council was upgraded to the Siliguri Municipal Corporation with 47 wards. It had five departments then: General Administration, Collection, License, Public Works and Sanitation and Public Health. As of now, the corporation has 23 departments. It has 47 wards, of which 14 wards are in Jalpaiguri district, while the remaining 33 wards are in Darjeeling district. The last municipal elections were held on 2015, when Communist Party of India (Marxist) won 23 seats, All India Trinamool Congress won 17 seats, Indian National Congress won 5 seats, Bharatiya Janata Party won 2 seats, while an independent candidate won 1 seat. The mayor of Siliguri for the five-year term from 2015 till 2020 was Ashok Bhattacharya from CPI(M), who was later elected as the local Member of Legislative Assembly as well.

The term of the last elected body of Siliguri Municipal Corporation ended on 7 May 2020 but municipal elections could not be held because of the COVID-19 pandemic. A Board of Administrators was established with the outgoing mayor, Ashok Bhattacharya, as the chairperson. This board will take care of the civic utilities of the city until the new municipal body is elected. This follows the establishment of similar boards first in state capital Kolkata and then the rest of the state.

=== Municipal finance ===
According to financial data published on the CityFinance Portal of the Ministry of Housing and Urban Affairs, the Siliguri Municipal Corporation reported total revenue receipts of ₹111 crore (US$13 million) and total expenditure of ₹139 crore (US$17 million) in 2022–23. Tax revenue accounted for about 14.4% of the total revenue, while the corporation received ₹42 crore in grants during the financial year.

=== Lok Sabha and Vidhan Sabha constituency ===
Siliguri is part of the Darjeeling Lok Sabha constituency. The last elections for the Lok Sabha took place in 2024, when Raju Bista from Bharatiya Janta Party won the seat. The last elections to the West Bengal Vidhan Sabha took place in 2021. The Member of Legislative Assembly representing Siliguri Vidhan Sabha Constituency is Sankar Ghosh.

=== Civic services and infrastructure ===
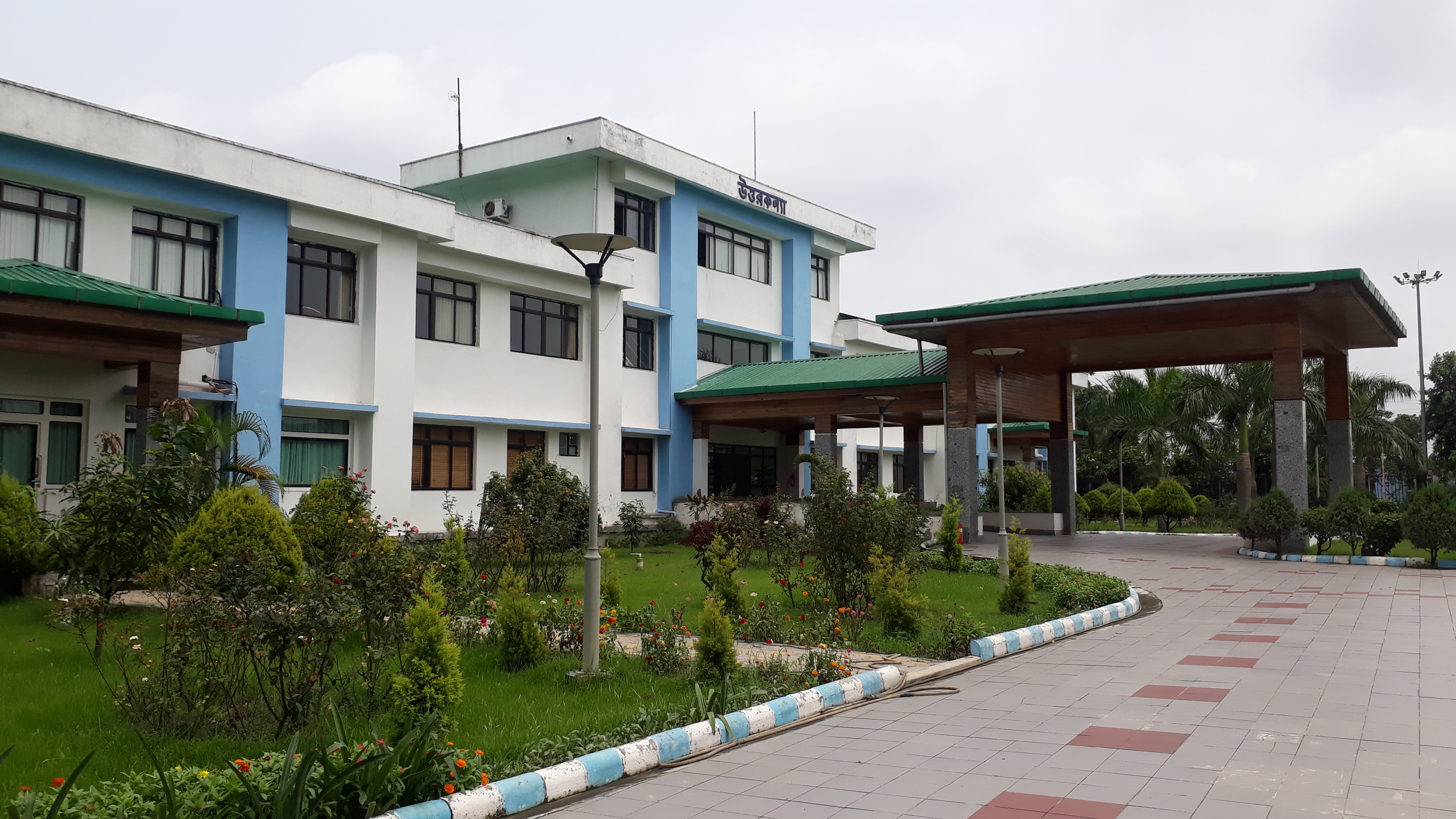
Uttar Kanya, the administrative headquarters of North Bengal

Building plans in Siliguri are approved by Siliguri Municipal corporation; for building up to 3 storeys including parking, the Borough Offices give clearance, while for buildings with more than 3 storeys, the Building Department gives the approval. The present City Development Plan 2041 for Siliguri was developed in 2015 as part of the Capacity Building for Urban Development project under the then Ministry of Urban Development by the private consultancy, CRISIL Risk and Infrastructure Solutions Limited. Siliguri City comes under Siliguri Jalpaiguri Planning Area and the responsibility of planning and development of the city lies with Siliguri Jalpaiguri Development Authority.

The Public Health Engineering Department of the state government is responsible for developing and maintaining the infrastructure for water supply, while the Water Supply department of the corporation provides new connections, supplies water, and collects the user charges. The Conservancy Environment Department of the corporation provides Solid Waste Management services in the city. Each ward in the city has its own Solid Waste Management committee that takes care of cleanliness at the ward level. The Public Works Department of the corporation and Siliguri Jalpaiguri Development Authority (SJDA) are both responsible for the construction and maintenance of roads in Siliguri. Siliguri Jalpaiguri Development Authority also prepared the Traffic & Transportation Master Plan 2030 and the Comprehensive Mobility Plan for Siliguri Jalpaiguri Planning Area.

== Flora and fauna ==
=== Flora ===
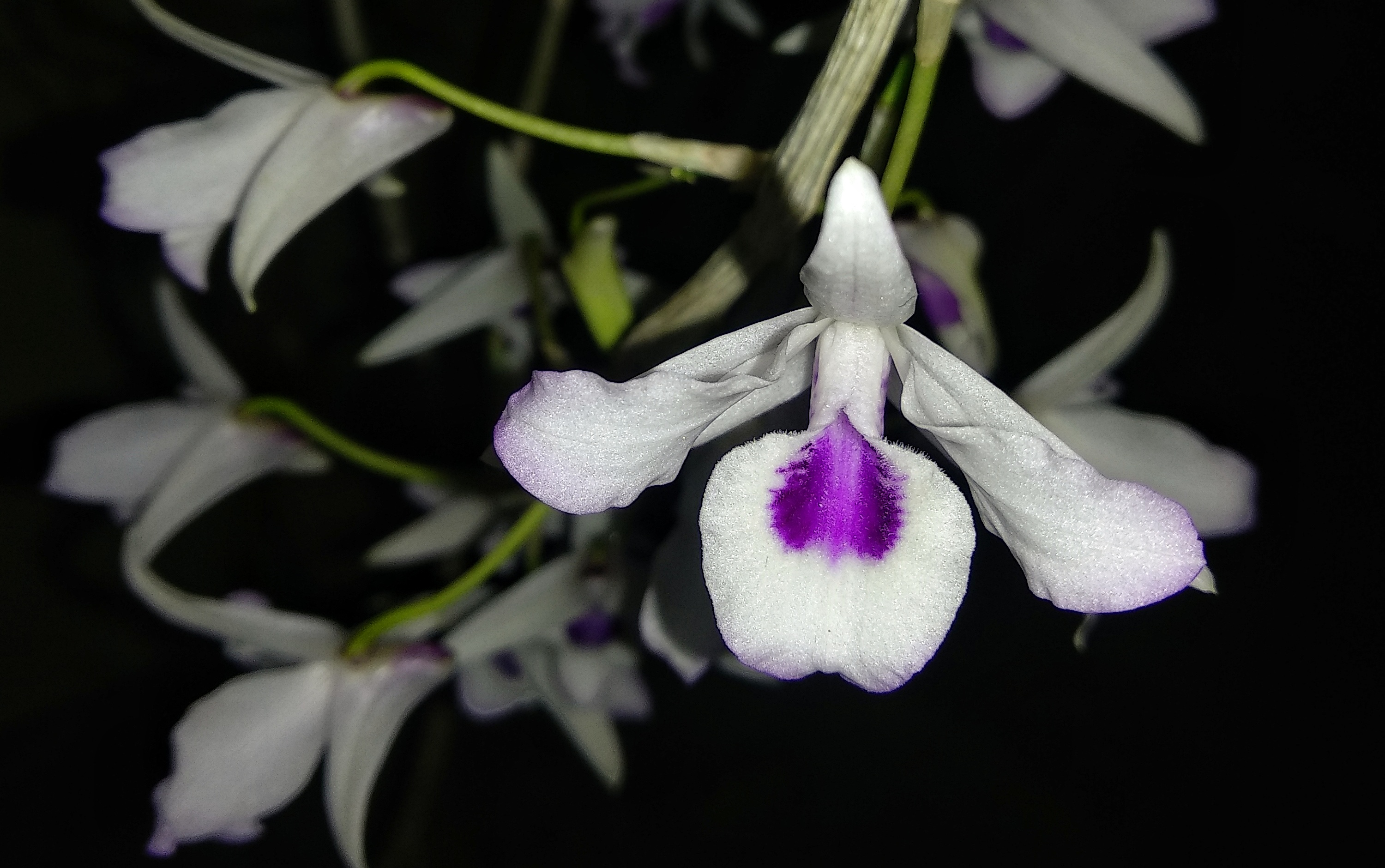
Native orchid

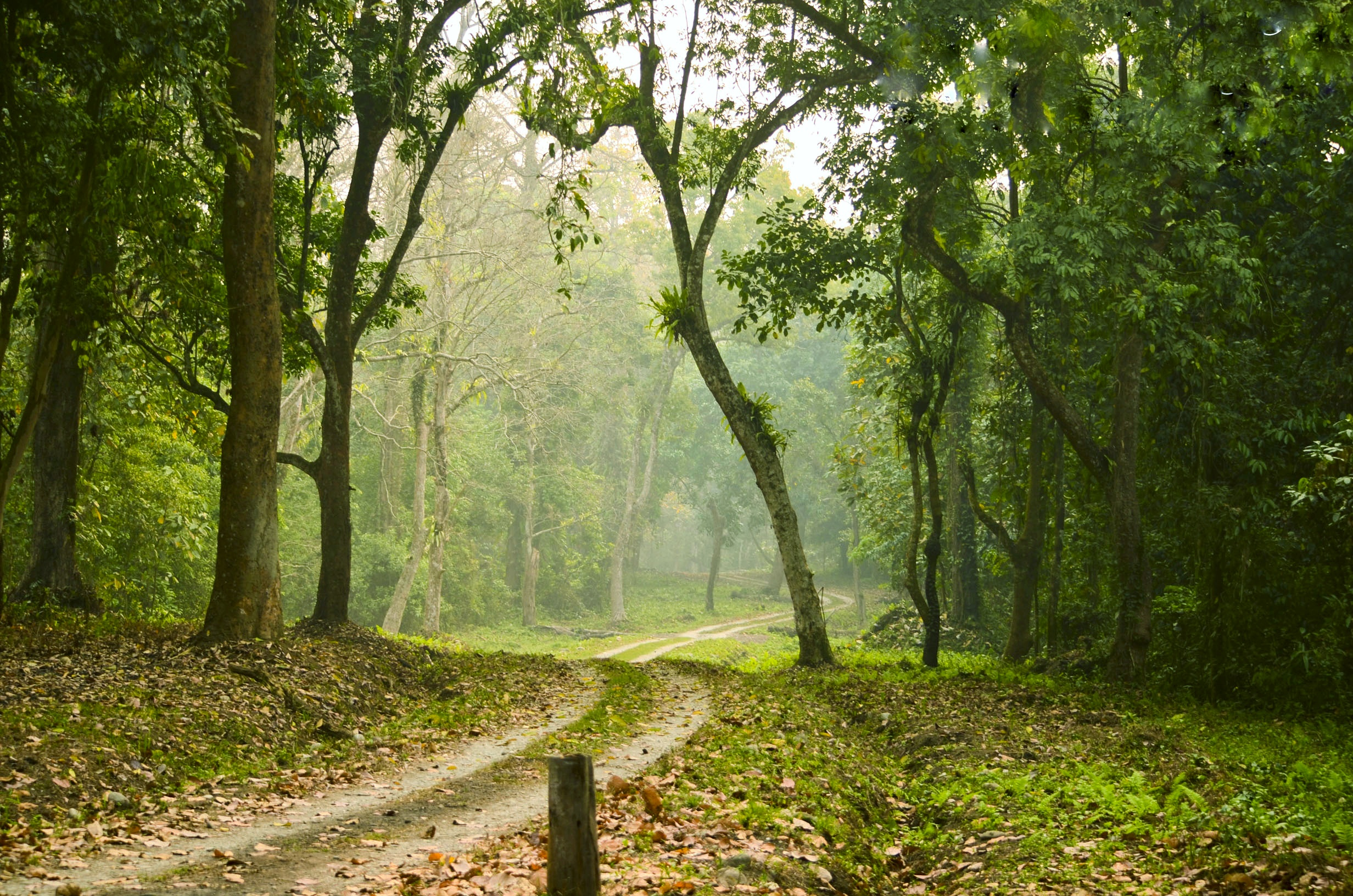
Sukna forest, Siliguri

Siliguri and the surrounding sub-Himalayan forests are rich in both their flora and fauna biodiversity. The plains of North Bengal (Siliguri, Jalpaiguri, Cooch Behar etc.) are surrounded by deep forests, which are home to various common and rare species of native plants. Notably, the forests here are moist Tropical and characterised by the dense growth of tall Sal (Shorea robusta) trees. Overall, Sal trees compose about 80% of all the vegetation in these tropical forests.

These forests are broadly categorised according to the dominant plant species in them, such as:

1) East Himalayan Sal Forest, present on the lower slopes of the Mahananda Wildlife Sanctuary. It contains Sal, Khair, Simul and Sissoo, alongside riverine grasslands and various rare species of plants like Orchids.

2) East Himalayan Upper Bhabar Sal Forest, mainly present in the Jalpaiguri district. It is characterised by a dense population of Microstegium chiliatum and Sal. Other notable species are Terminalia tomentosa and Schima wallichii.

3) Eastern Tarai Sal Forest, mainly present in lower altitudes compared to the other two types of forest. It is characterised by various species of bamboos and ferns, alongside Sal which is found in Baikunthapur Forest (near the Siliguri urban area).

In recent times, the rapid growth of the city has led to deforestation, much like other urban areas globally. This has in turn made Siliguri's climate warmer, disrupting some of the local ecosystems.

=== Fauna ===
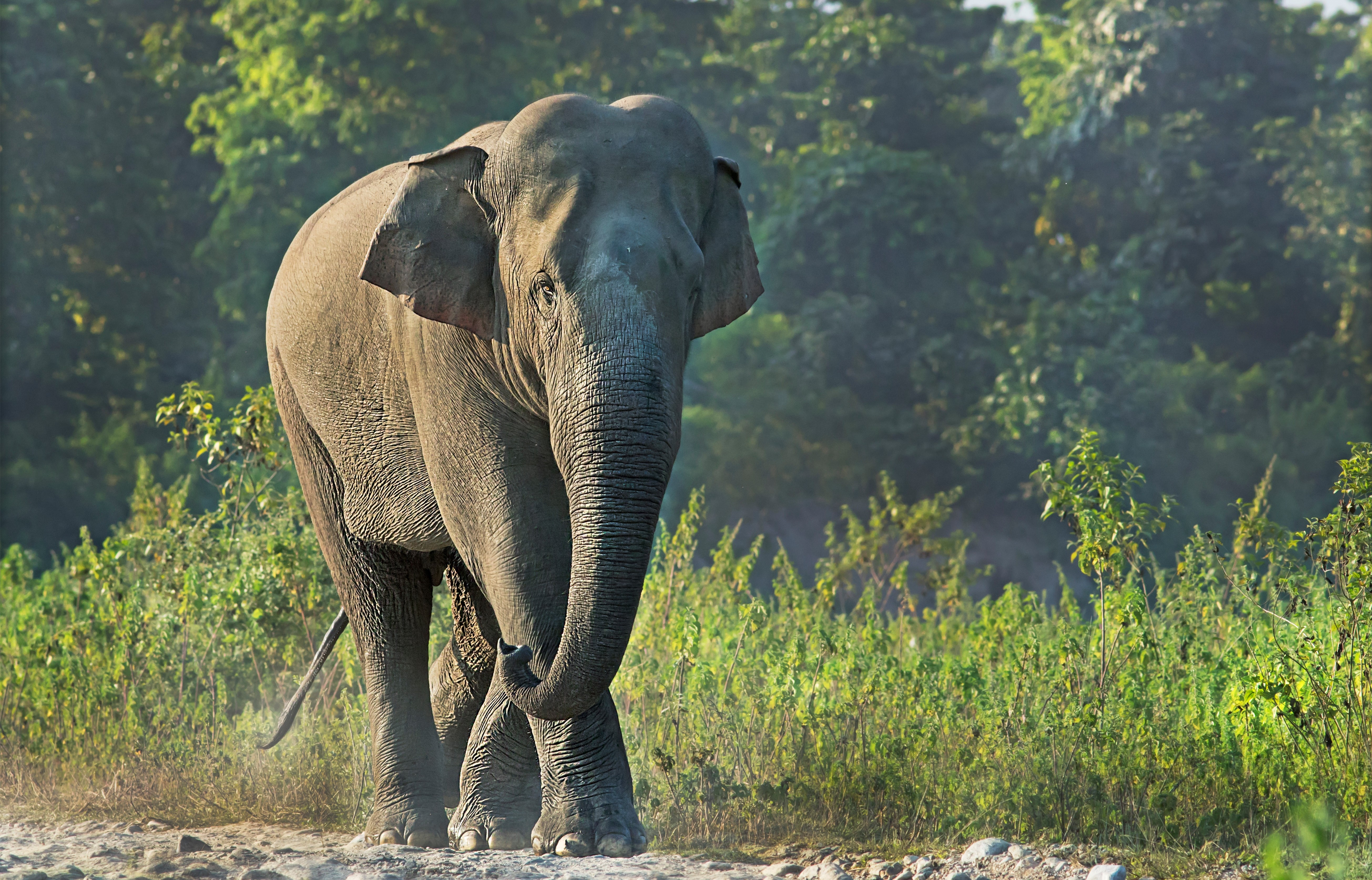
Wild Indian elephant at Mahananda Wildlife Sanctuary

Siliguri is located in the Terai region of the Indo-Gangetic Plain, which is a belt of marshy grasslands and dense tropical deciduous forests at the base of the Himalayan range. The region is rich in biodiversity, containing numerous rare species of flora and fauna. These forests are especially notable for their distinct variety of wildlife. For example, Mahananda Wildlife Sanctuary near Siliguri is famous for its Indian elephants. Sukna is the gateway to this sanctuary, which is located 12 km (7.5 mi) from Siliguri.

These sub-Himalayan forests are home to various types of wild animals like the elephant, tiger, Indian bison, barking deer, wild pig, monkey, civet, snake, lizard, mountain goat, sambar, chital and fishing cat. These forests are also home to about 243 different bird species like the pied hornbill, egret, kingfisher, drongo, fly catcher, woodpecker and others. Migratory water birds are also a common sight.

== Transport ==
=== Roads ===
The NH 27 crosses through the heart of the city and is now a part of the AH2 project. Siliguri is the origin of the century old Hill Cart Road (also known as) NH 110, which connects Siliguri to Darjeeling (77 km (48 mi)) dating from the British period. It is connected to Gangtok via the NH 10. The NH 12 which connects Pankhabari with Mirik. Highways NH 327 and NH 327B connect Siliguri to Panitanki and Mechi Bridge. In June 2026, the state government introduced a free public transit initiative for women passengers. Under this scheme, women holding valid government-issued identity documents (such as Aadhaar cards) can travel free of charge on all state-run buses. In Siliguri, the service is primarily utilised via the North Bengal State Transport Corporation (NBSTC) operating out of the Tenzing Norgay Bus Terminus, connecting commuters to surrounding regional destinations including Jalpaiguri, Alipurduar, and Cooch Behar. Adjacent countries are connected through the following routes:

- Nepal: via Panitanki
- Bangladesh: via Phulbari
- China: via Nathula
- Bhutan: via Jaigaon

==== Bus services ====
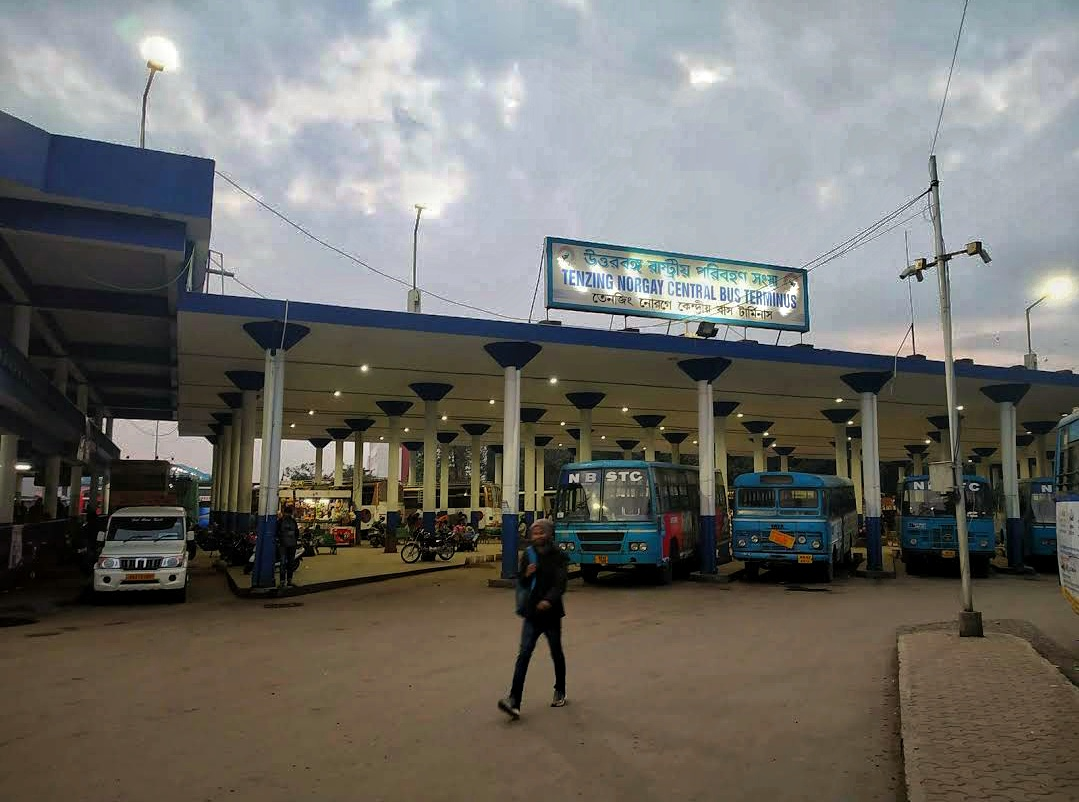
Tenzing Norgay Bus Terminus

- Tenzing Norgay Bus Terminus: Tenzing Norgay Bus Terminus is the main bus terminus and serves as a bus depot for both the Government and a private bus service operated by NBSTC. It connects to cities in Sikkim, Assam, Bihar, Jharkhand, Meghalaya etc. and all other districts and cities in West Bengal including Darjeeling, Kalimpong, Jalpaiguri, Cooch Behar, Alipurduar, Malda, Balurghat, Raiganj, Dalkhola, Berhampore, Kolkata, Asansol, Suri and the SBSTC headquarters Durgapur etc.
- Sikkim Nationalised Transport Bus Terminus: Sikkim Nationalised Transport Bus Terminus (Siliguri) is located at the hill-cart road in Siliguri. This bus terminus is operated by the Sikkim Government. Buses connecting towns and cities of Sikkim are mainly operated from here. This bus terminus is one of the busiest and most important bus termini in the Siliguri area. Sikkim Nationalised Transport Bus Terminus (Siliguri), which connects Sikkim.
- P. C. Mittal Memorial Bus Terminus: P.C. Mittal Memorial Bus Terminus is a bus terminal located on Sevoke Road, Siliguri, District Darjeeling. Both state owned North Bengal State Transport Corporation (NBSTC) buses and private buses towards Dooars areas ply from here.

=== Rail ===
Being a transportation hub, Siliguri is well connected through railway with almost all parts of the country. There are seven stations that serve the city.

New Jalpaiguri Junction railway station

New Jalpaiguri Junction railway station, established in 1960 (station code: NJP) is an A1 category broad gauge and narrow gauge railway station under Katihar railway division of Northeast Frontier Railway zone. It is the largest railway station of Northeast India serving the city Siliguri. This station is well connected to almost all parts of the country except Goa. This station ranked 10th cleanest railway station in India in a 2016 survey and was among the top 100 booking stations of Indian railway. Many premium services are available, including India's first Vande Bharat Sleeper Express Kamakhya–Howrah Vande Bharat Sleeper Express, Howrah–New Jalpaiguri Vande Bharat Express, New Jalpaiguri - Guwahati Vande Bharat Express, New Jalpaiguri–Patna Vande Bharat Express, 4 Rajdhani Express, 3 Tourist Vistadome Express, 1 Shatabdi Express, 6 Amrit Bharat Express and 2 Humsafar Express.

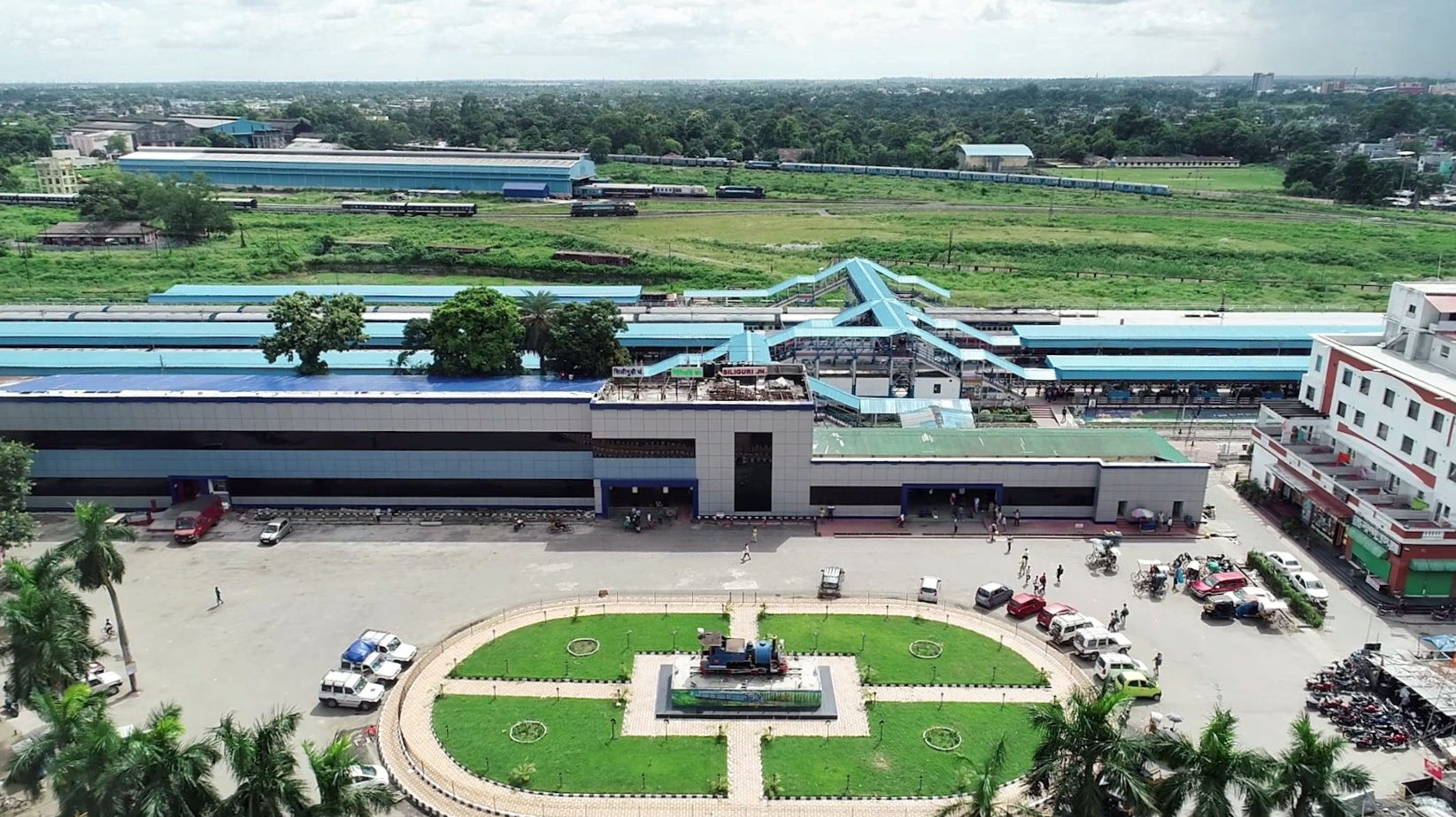
Siliguri Junction railway station

Siliguri Junction

Siliguri Junction railway station (station code: SGUJ) established in 1949 is another major broad gauge and narrow gauge railway station of Siliguri. Until 2011 it was the only triple gauge (broad gauge, meter gauge and narrow gauge) railway station in India. After 2011, the meter gauge was shut down, but the track remains between Siliguri Junction railway station and Bagdogra railway station. Many different cities in India are serviced from this station.

Siliguri Town railway station

Siliguri Town railway station is one of the oldest railway station (station code: SGUT) of the region, opened in 1880 for the Darjeeling Himalayan Railway (Toy train) connecting Siliguri to Darjeeling. Its importance has now lessened with the construction of the Siliguri Junction railway station and New Jalpaiguri junction. Siliguri Town railway station is also a broad gauge and narrow gauge railway station, and is halting point for 8 trains only.

Bagdogra railway station

Bagdogra railway station (station code: BORA) comes under greater Siliguri metropolitan area. It is 10 km (6.2 mi) from Siliguri junction and is the third largest railway station after NJP and Siliguri Junction. This station serves Bagdogra and adjacent areas. Bagdogra railway station is on the Siliguri-Aluabari broad gauge single line via Thakurganj. This station is the halting point for 14 trains.

Gulma railway station

Gulma railway station Railway (station code: GLMA) is part of the Siliguri Urban area. It is 12 km (7.5 mi) from Siliguri City center and serves Champasari Anchal and Gulma areas. Gulma railway station is on the New Jalpaiguri-Alipurduar-Samuktala Road Line. This station is the halting point of 5 trains. Mainly passenger train halt at in this station.

Matigara railway station

Matigara Railway Station (station code: MTRA) is situated at Mathapari, West Bengal. Trains passing through this station include MLFC - SGUJ DEMU and SGUJ- MLFC DEMU. This station has a single platform and two tracks; one broad gauge line and one metre gauge line.

Rangapani railway station

Rangapani railway station (station code RNI) is part of the greater Siliguri metropolitan area. It is 14 km (8.7 mi) from Siliguri City center and serves Rangapani and adjacent areas. Rangapani railway station is on the Howrah-New Jalpaiguri line. This station is a halting point for 2 passenger trains.

=== Air ===
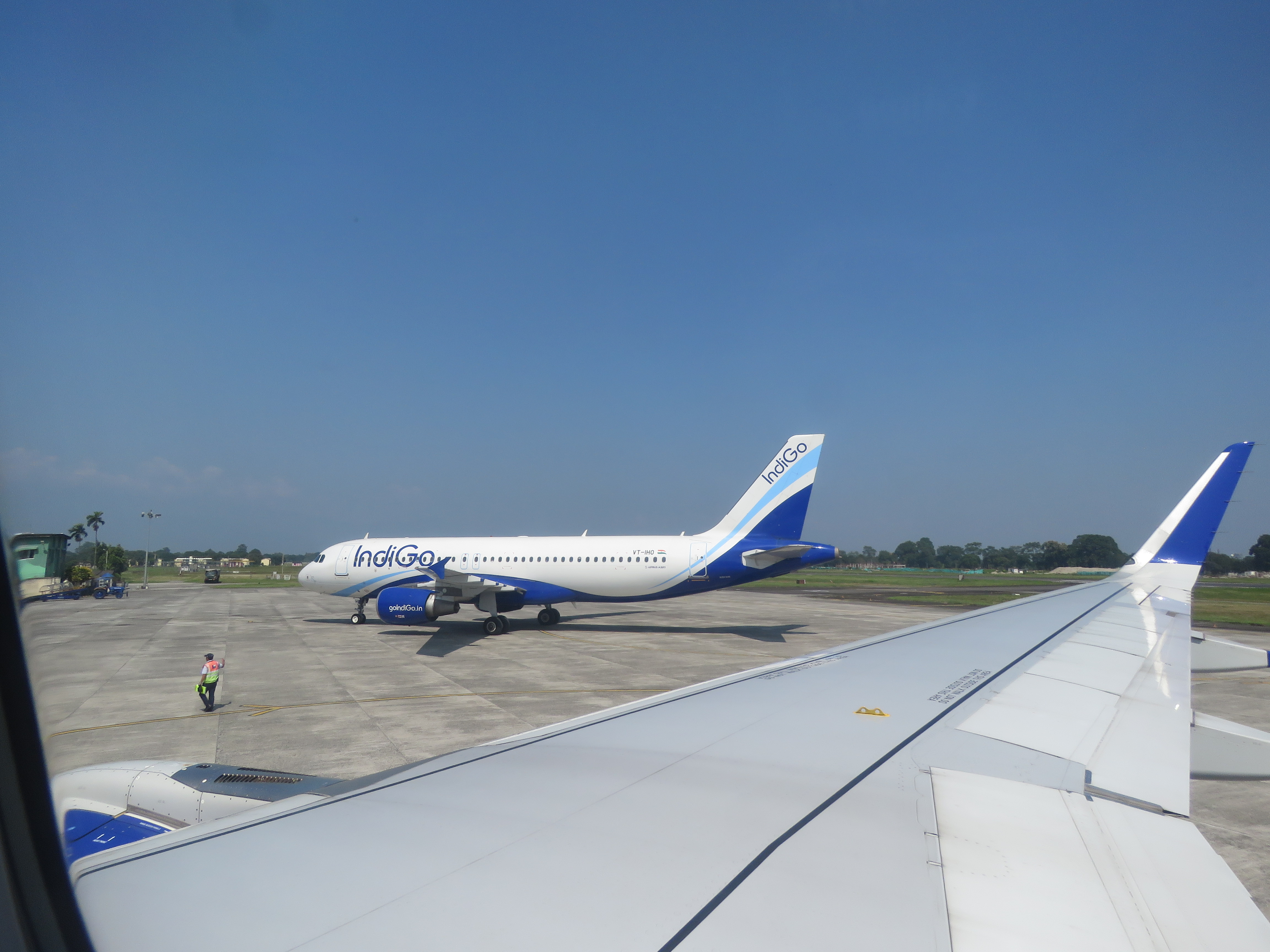
Aircraft at Bagdogra International Airport

Bagdogra Airport is an international airport located towards the west of Siliguri city, operated as a civil enclave at AFS Bagdogra of the Indian Air Force. This airport is a major transport hub in the region, with flights to Kolkata, Durgapur, New Delhi, Mumbai, Chennai, Bangalore, Hyderabad, Ahmedabad, Guwahati, Dibrugarh and has international connectivity with Paro and Bangkok. The airport also has regular helicopter services to Gangtok. Due to its location near Darjeeling hills and Sikkim, the Bagdogra Airport sees thousands of tourists annually.

Central government of India confirmed international airport status to this airport in 2002 with limited international operations. This is one of the few airports in India with zero sales tax on aviation turbine fuel.

== Educational facilities ==
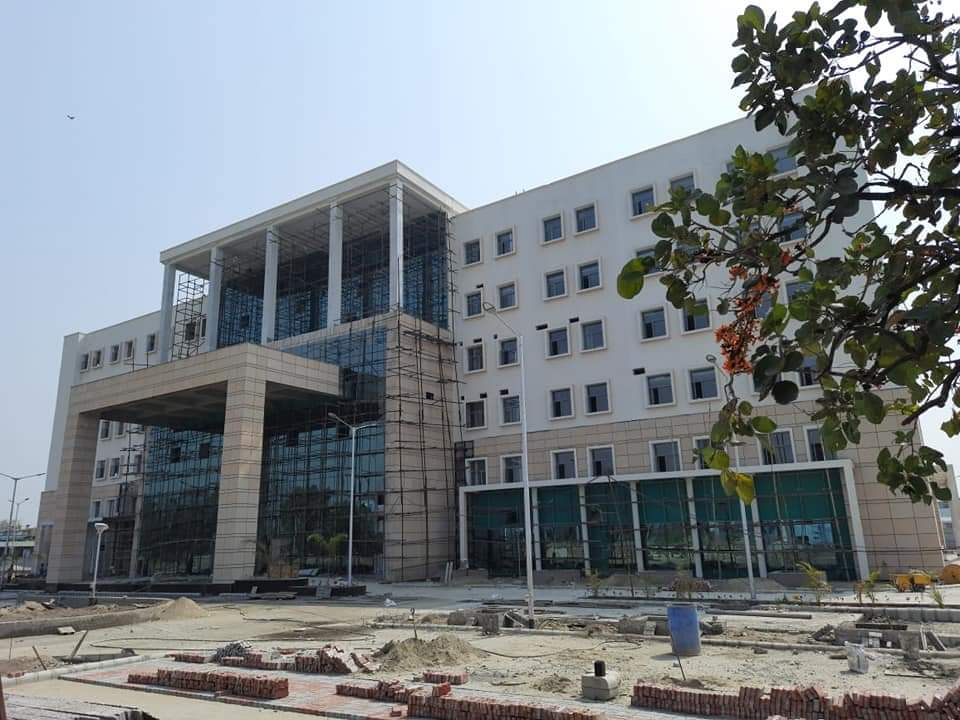
Super Speciality Block, North Bengal Medical College

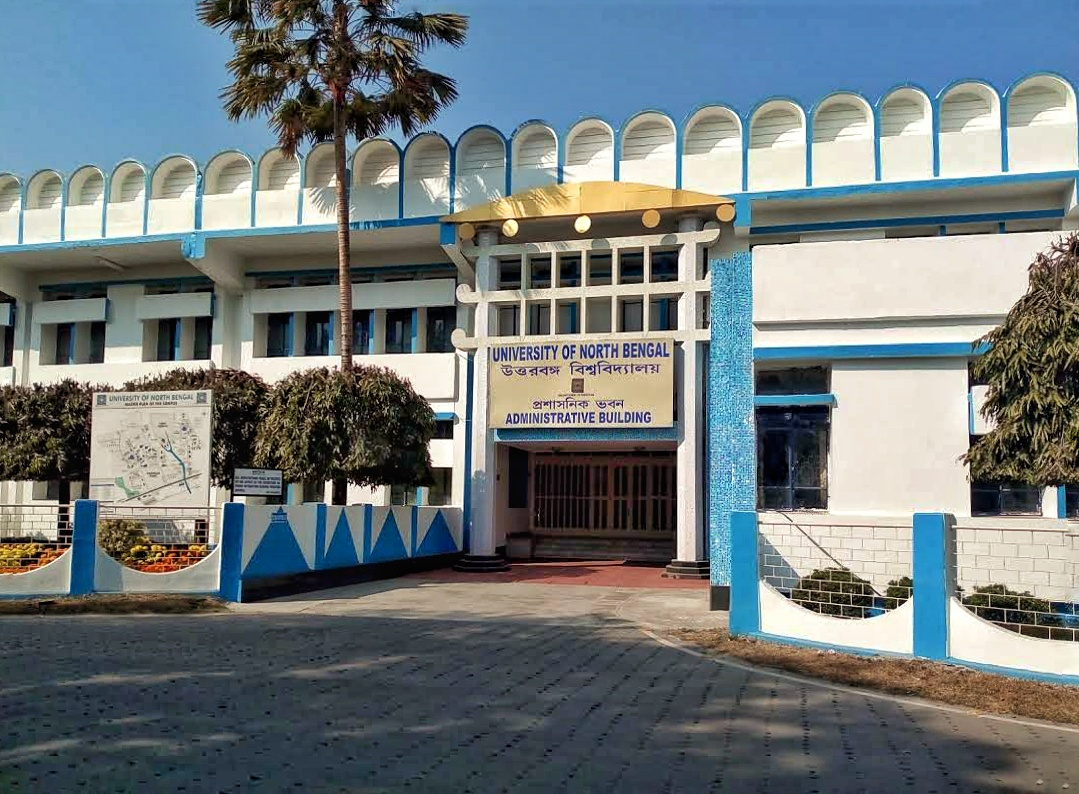
North Bengal University administrative building.

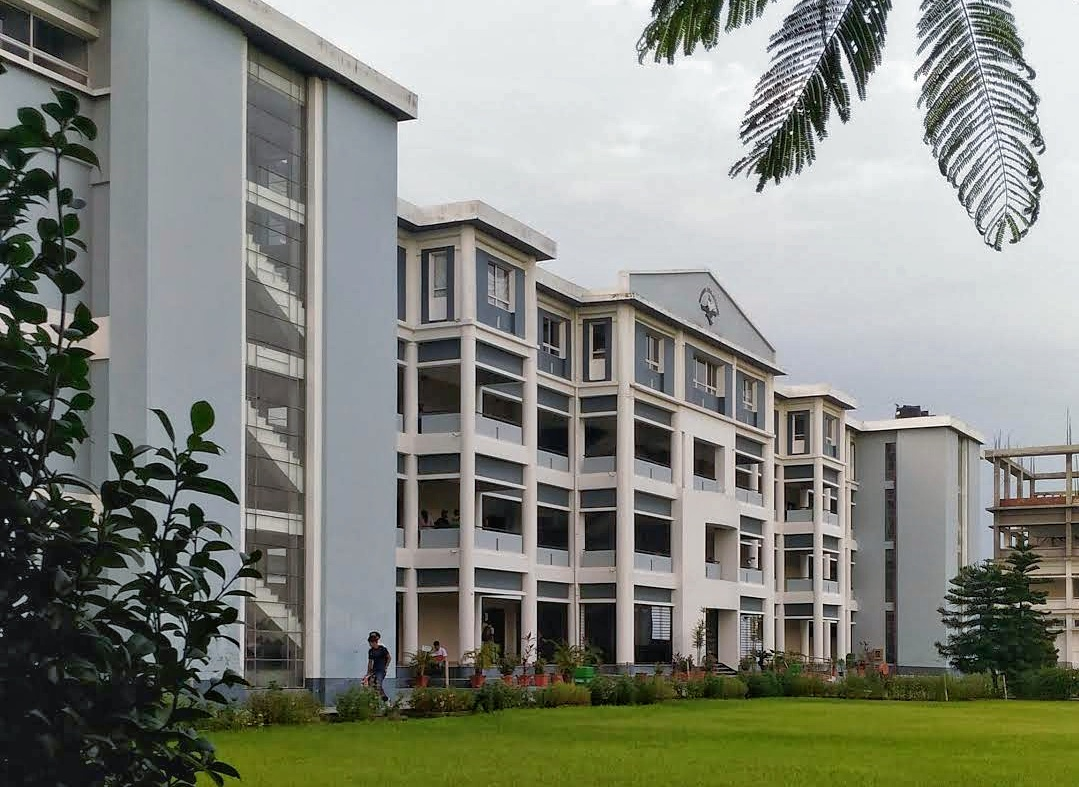
North Bengal St. Xavier's College.

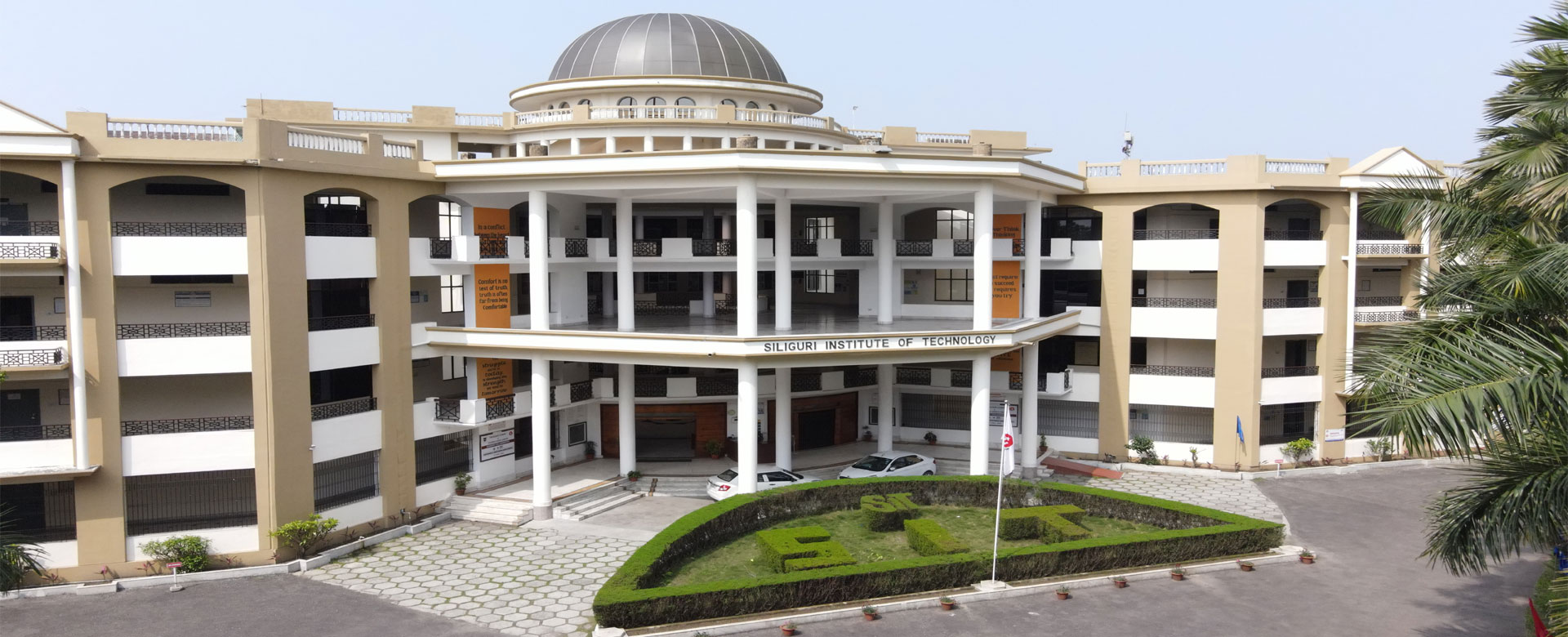
Siliguri Institute of Technology

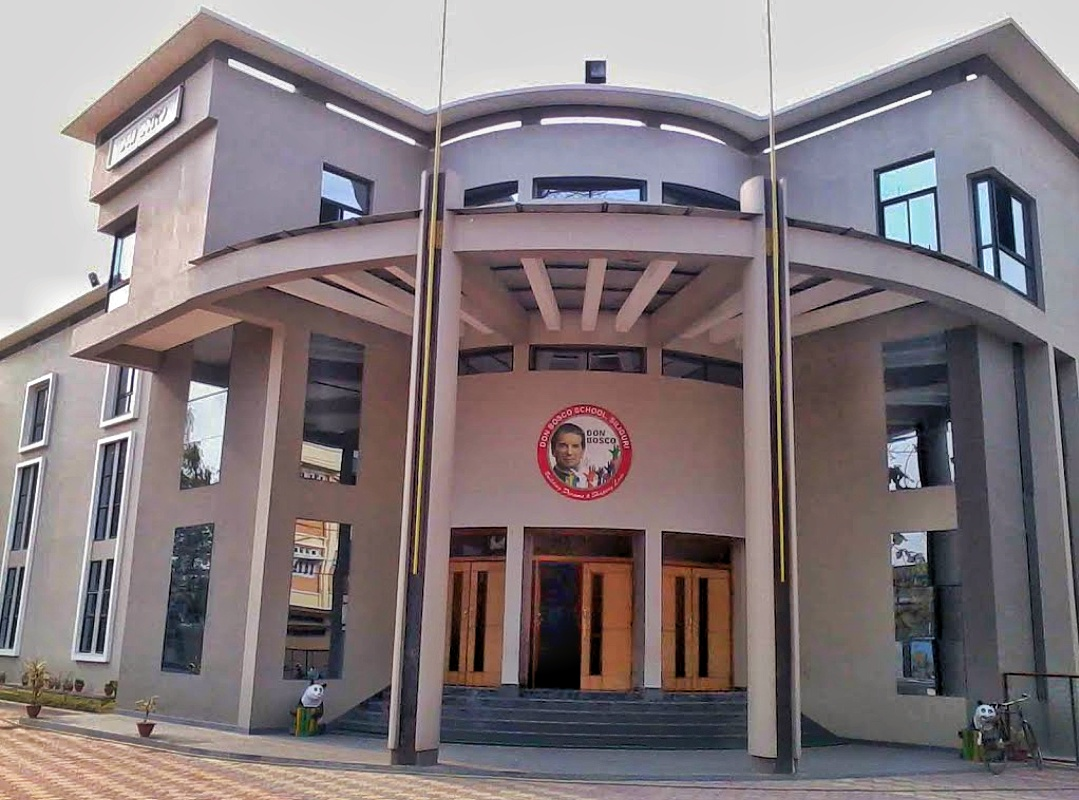
Don Bosco School, Siliguri.

=== University ===
- University of North Bengal, since 1962

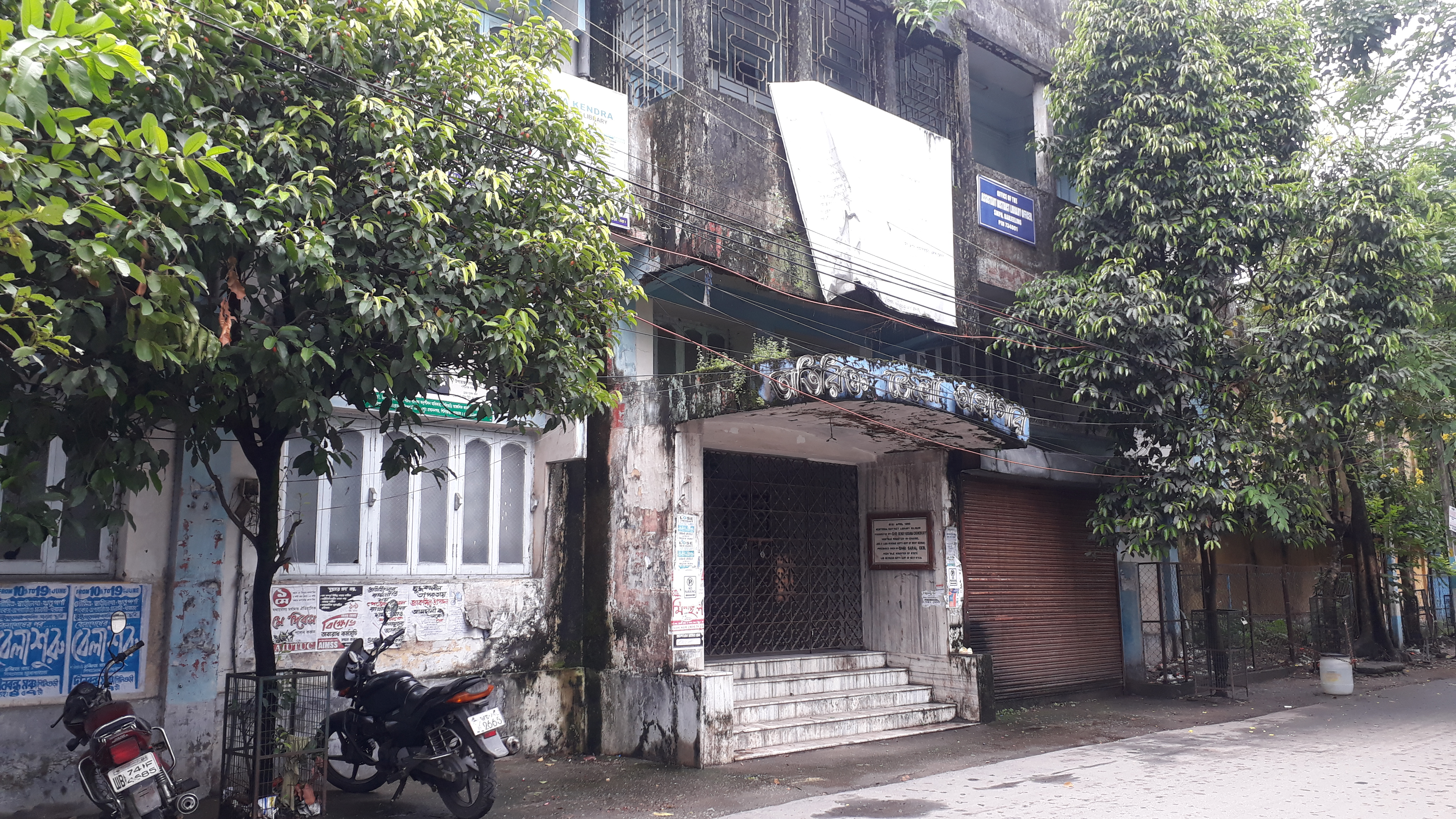
Additional District Library, Siliguri

=== Colleges ===
General degree colleges

- Siliguri College, Since 1950
- North Bengal St. Xavier's College

Medical colleges

- North Bengal Medical College and Hospital, Since 1968
- North Bengal Dental College and Hospital

Engineering colleges

- Siliguri Institute of Technology

Other Colleges

- Inspiria knowledge campus

=== Schools ===
English Medium Schools

- Delhi Public School (CBSE)

Army Schools

- Army Public School (Bengdubi & Khaprail)
- Army Public School, Sukna
- Kendriya Vidyalaya Sevoke Road

== Media ==
Newspaper
Various English language newspapers including The Telegraph, Times of India, The Statesman, The Economic Times, and The Asian Age are widely circulated throughout the city. Several Bengali language newspapers including Uttarbanga Sambad, Anandabazar Patrika, Bartaman, Uttarer Saradin, Aajkaal, Pratidin, and Ganashakti and Nepali Paper Himalaya Darpan are available. The leading Hindi dailies Prabhat Khabar and Janpath Samachar are also published from Siliguri. The online based news portals: Siliguri Times, Khabar Arohan, Bong Siliguri Times, CCN News, The Siliguri Journal, Siliguri Barta, and the Times of North provide live updates regarding Siliguri and adjacent areas.

Radio
All India Radio Siliguri was commissioned in 1963 as an additional station of AIR Kolkata. It has two groups of transmitters: high power BEL HMB 140 (AM) -2 [2×100 kW] and medium range GCEL 136 (FM) - 2 [2×5 kW], for broadcasting programs. Prantik was the first program broadcast from here in 1969. In the course of time many notable individuals like Hemanta Mukhopadhyay, Ustad Rashid Khan, Subhas Mukhopadhyay, Shashi Kapoor, Manabendra Mukhopadhyay, Madhuri Chattopadhyay, and Priya Ranjan Dasmunshi have visited AIR Siliguri. Popular programs executing from here are Pratyusha, Yuva Anusthan, Grame Ganje, Mahila Majlis, Mananiyeshu, Sishumahal and Arogya. Two radio channels are operated from AIR Siliguri through which programs are broadcasting daily:

| No. | Name | Frequency | Language |
|---|---|---|---|
| 01 | Primary Channel (PC) | PC: 421.9 Metres 711 kHz (Medium wave) | Bengali |
| 02 | Vividh Bharati Service (VBS) | VBS: 101.4 MHz (High wave) | Bengali/Hindi |

In addition to the All India Radio, Siliguri has several private FM radio channels:

| No. | Name | Frequency | Language |
|---|---|---|---|
| 01 | Nine FM | 91.9 FM | Hindi |
| 02 | Radio High | 92.7 FM | Hindi |
| 03 | Red FM | 93.5 FM | Hindi |
| 04 | Radio Misty | 94.3 FM | Bengali |
| 05 | Radio Mirchi | 98.3 FM | Bengali |
| 06 | Air Rainbow | 102.3 FM | Hindi/English |

Television
Siliguri receives almost all the television channels received by rest of the country. Apart from the national terrestrial network Doordarshan, cable TV serves most of the houses. Siliguri also receives some Nepali and Bangladeshi channels too. Siliguri has three local channels: CCN, Amar Cable and HTV. There is a TV tower in Kurseong, about 25 km (16 mi) from Siliguri.

== Sports facilities ==
Siliguri hosts numerous sporting events and matches to facilitate developing young athletes from the city. Local clubs in Siliguri that conduct matches include cricket, football, volleyball, swimming, and table-tennis. Sports Authority of India (SAI) in Kanchenjunga Stadium conducts football and athletics. With the provision for an international outdoor and indoor stadium, Siliguri has enough opportunities to host national level matches. This has led Siliguri to become a prominent city for national champions like Mantu Ghosh, the gold medalist winner in the bi-annual South Asian Games (SAF) for table tennis, Ankita Das, Nandita Saha, and Soumyajit Ghosh - another internationally acclaimed table tennis player- and Wriddhiman Saha – Indian international cricketer who plays First-class and Test cricket for the Indian national team. Siliguri has done a tremendous job for Indian table tennis. Bikash Ghosh Memorial Swimming Pool is beside Kanchenjunga Stadium in the city, and conducts swimming competitions. White water rafting is done nearby in the Teesta River.

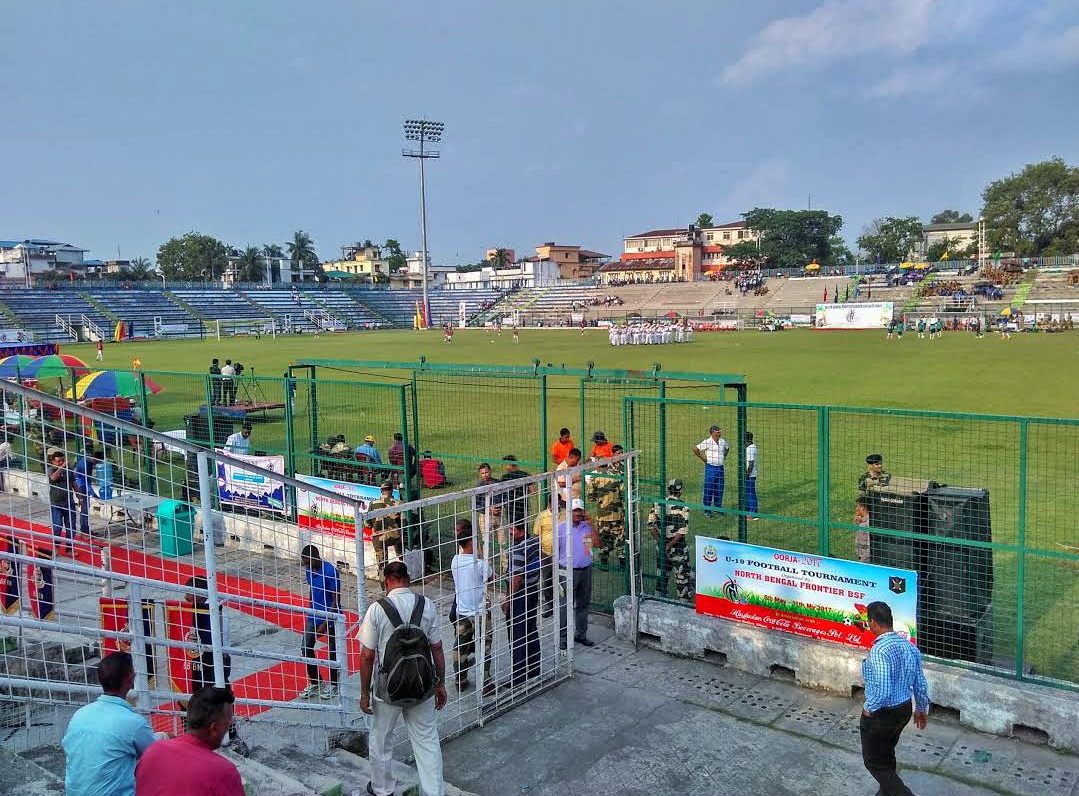
U-19 football tournament at Kanchenjunga Stadium, Siliguri

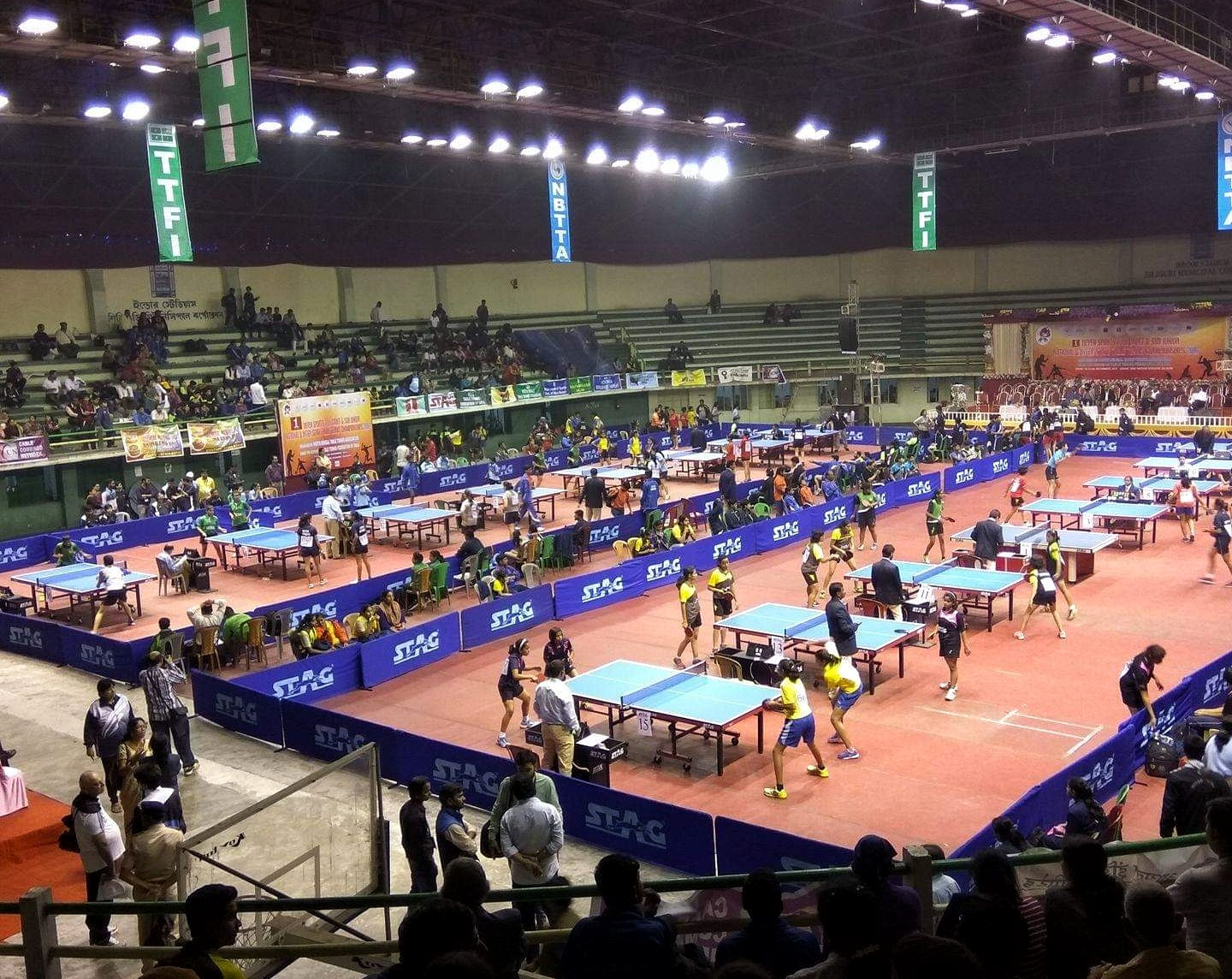
Municipal corporation indoor stadium

=== Kanchenjunga Stadium ===
Kanchenjunga Stadium, a multipurpose stadium, is the main stadium in Siliguri, and is primarily used for football matches, although it has also hosted several cricket matches. It has a seating capacity of 30,000.

Football:

- This stadium hosted the Federation Cup 2012 matches of India.
- The final match of the 2013–14 Santosh Trophy was played at the stadium in March 2014.
- Seven rounds of the 2015 I-League 2nd Division match were played on this ground.
- It also hosted two Kolkata derby matches in 2016 I-league and one in 2017.
- All the matches of 2016 SAFF Women's Championship were played in the Kanchenjunga Stadium.

Cricket:

- This stadium has hosted 11 Ranji Trophy matches.
- Two Celebrity Cricket League matches were played here.

=== Municipal corporation indoor stadium ===
Indoor sports including table tennis, badminton, taekwondo, lawn tennis and chess are played here. Siliguri is renowned for being the training grounds of table tennis players. This stadium can hold 5000 people at a time. The Senior National Table Tennis Championship was recently organised here. Sports festival, 2017 was also held in this indoor stadium.

== Visitors' attractions ==
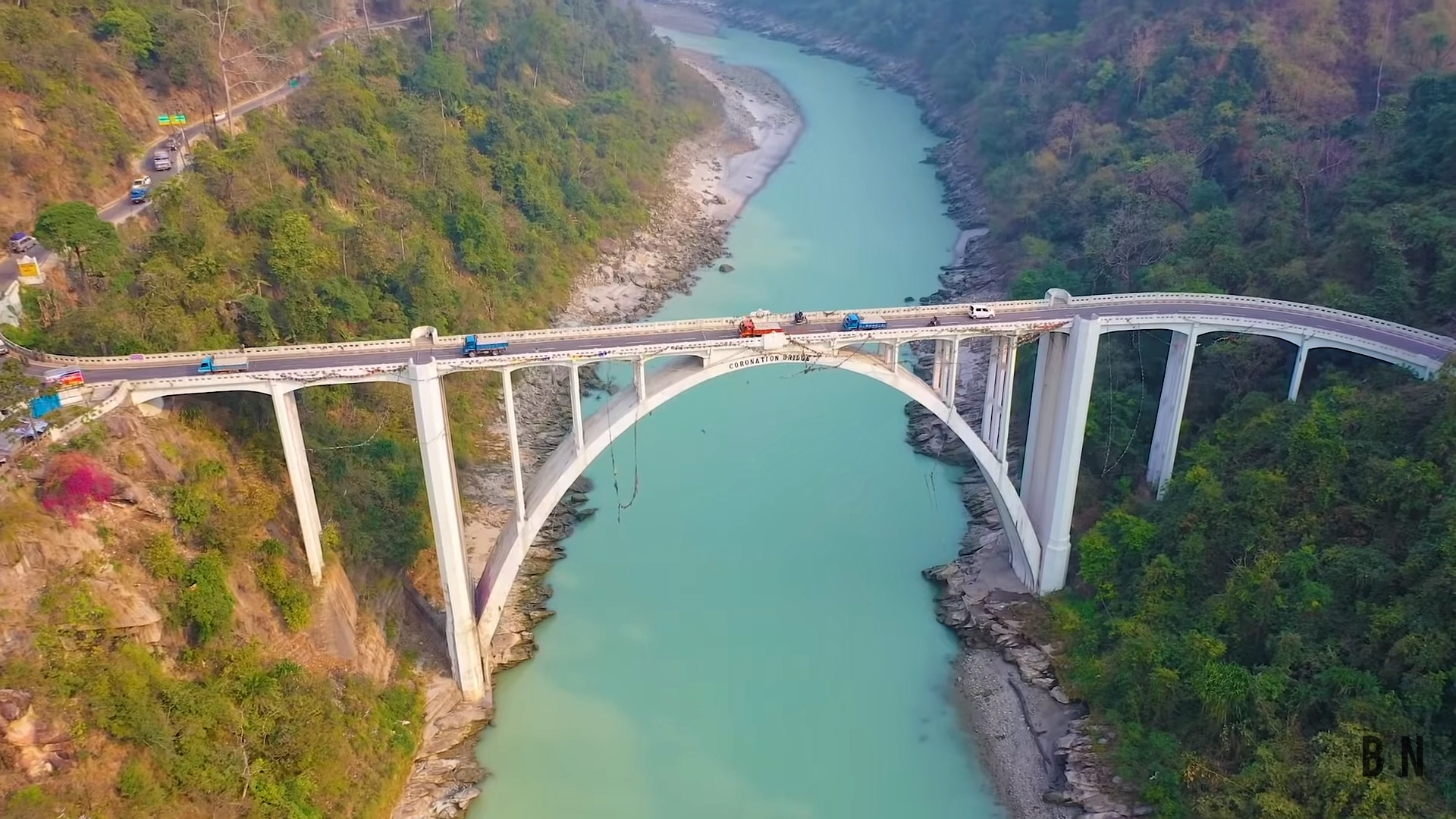
Coronation Bridge on Teesta

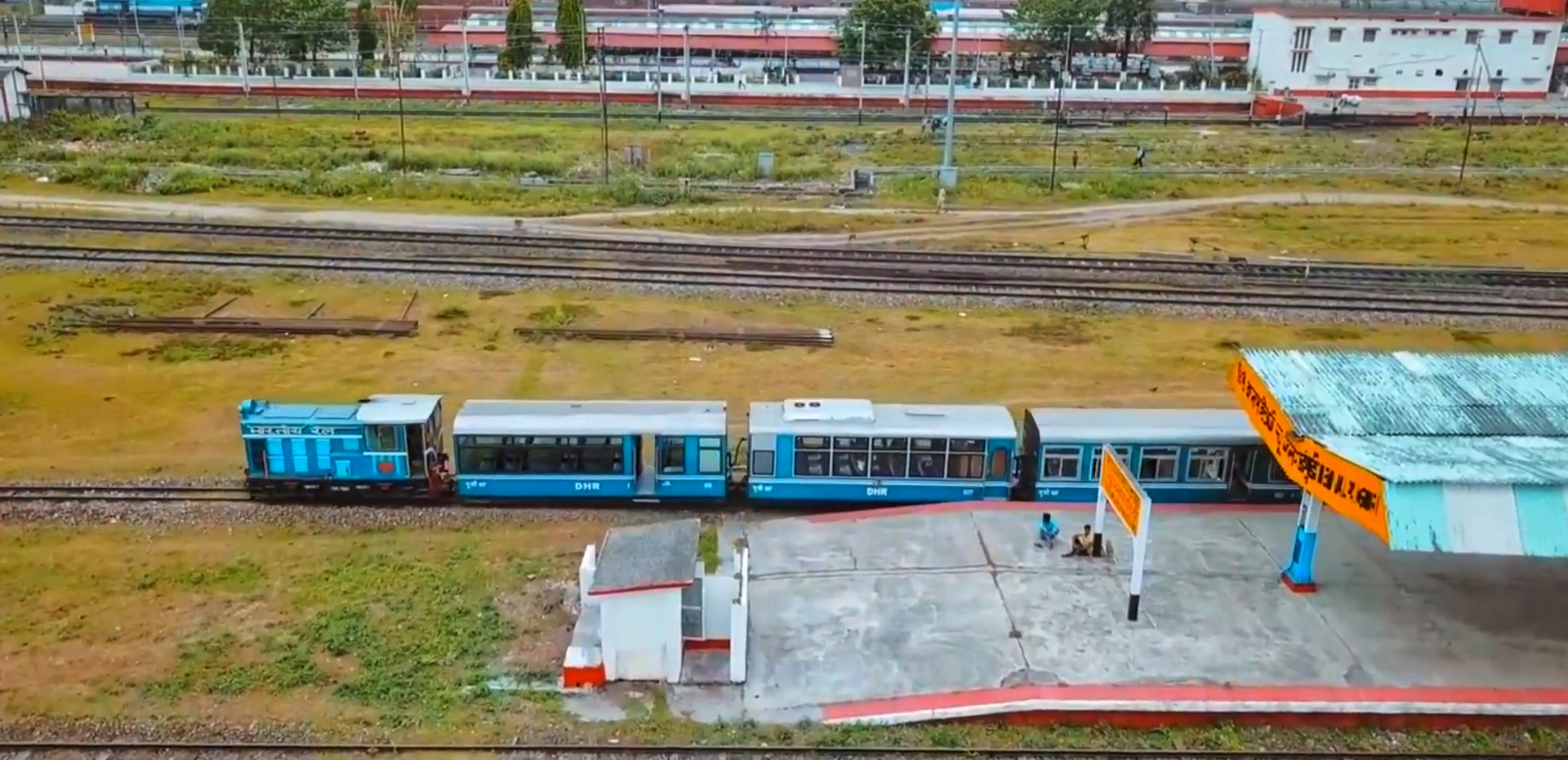
Heritage Toy Train at NJP

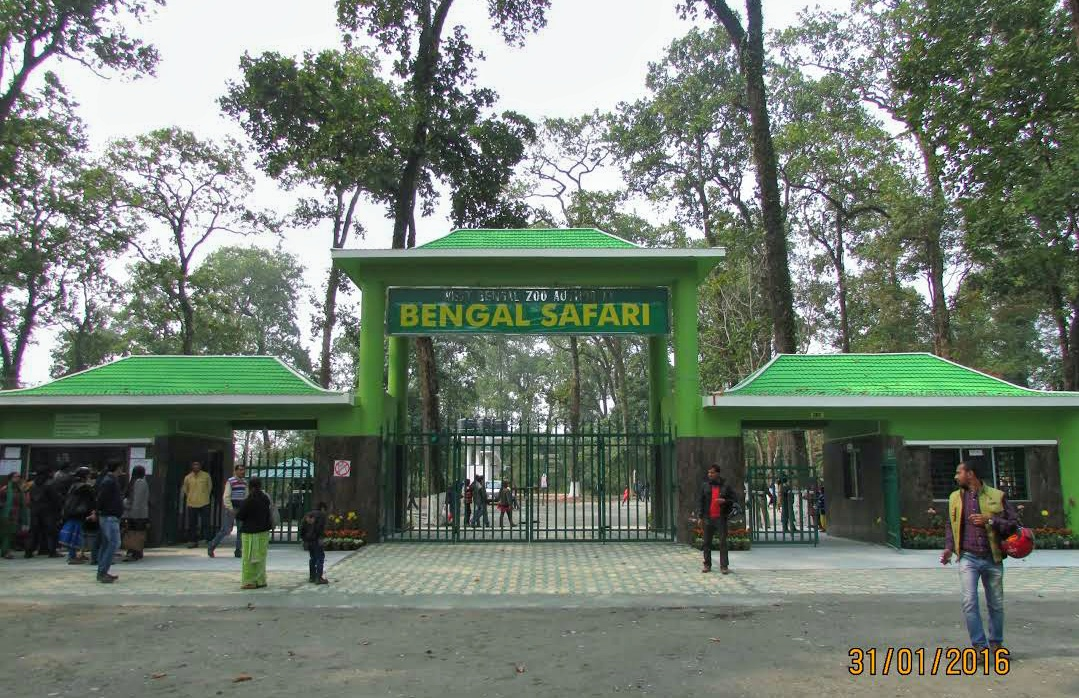
Bengal Safari Park

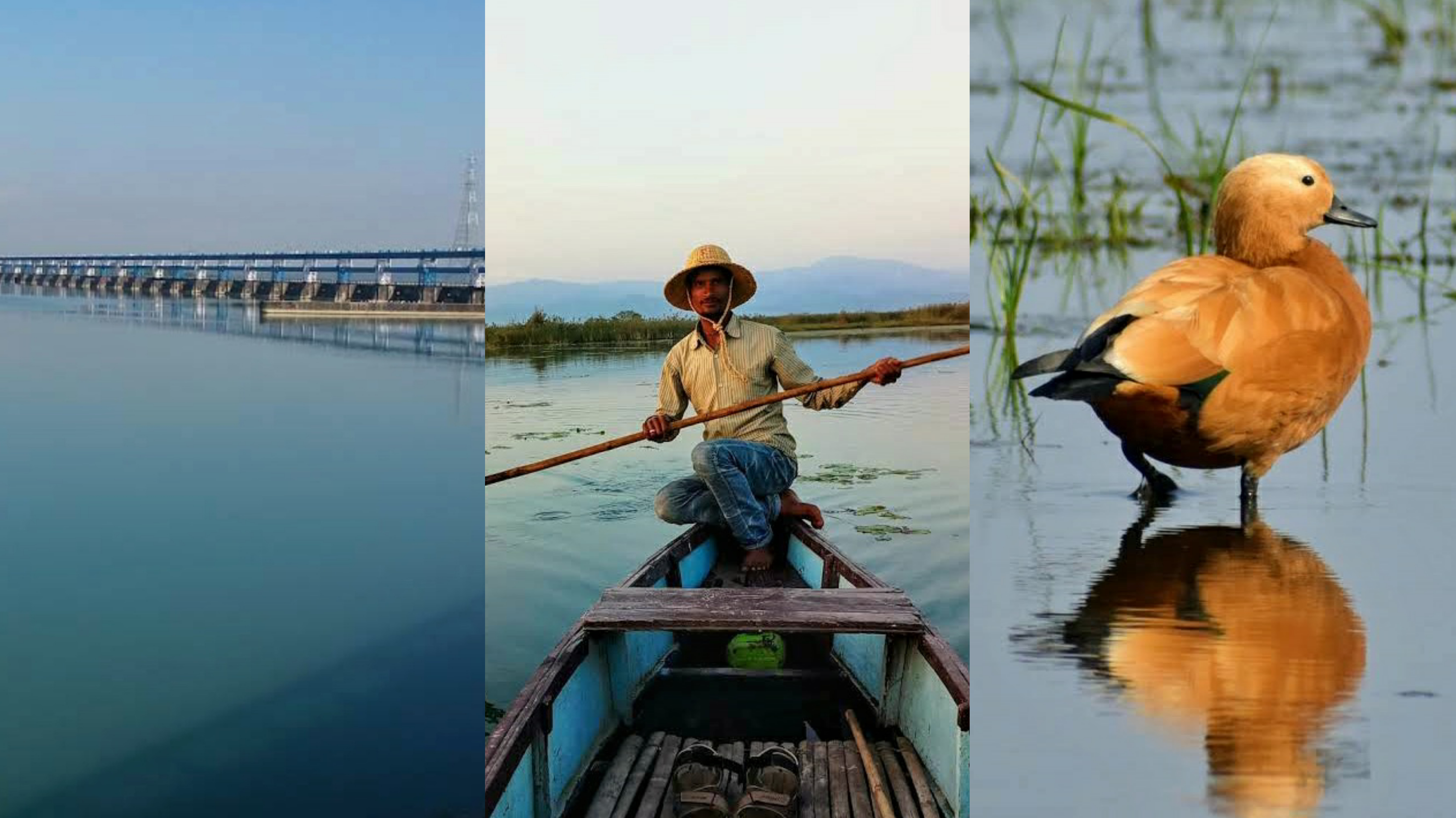
Gajoldoba view point

Darjeeling Himalayan Railway toy train runs between New Jalpaiguri, Siliguri and Darjeeling. It was built between 1879 and 1881 and has been designated as a UNESCO World Heritage Site. Coronation Bridge, also known as Sevoke Bridge, is situated on lower Himalaya about 20 km (12 mi) from Siliguri and was made in 1930. This bridge spans across Teesta River. Gajoldoba view point is 28 km (17 mi) from Siliguri, famous for the huge reservoir formed by Teesta Barrage. This reservoir is home for many species of migratory birds, including river lapwing, great crested grebe, Indian cormorant, purple heron, Eurasian wigeon, common shelduck, cotton teal, tufted duck, little ringed plover, and great cormorant. Due to shuttling of migratory birds, the Pakhibitan sanctuary was established here. A boating facility is available.

North Bengal Wild Animals Park, about 8 km (5.0 mi) away from the city, offers visitors the 'Bengal Safari' to experience sub-Himalayan wildlife closely, such as jungle fowl, sambar deer, Bengal tiger, wild boars, spotted deer, wild bear, and rhinoceros. It is fundamentally a part of the Mahananda Wildlife Sanctuary, spread over an area of 700 acres. The park conducts herbivore safaris, carnivore safaris, and elephant safaris. The Mahananda Wildlife Sanctuary is located 13 km (8.1 mi) away from Siliguri on the foothills of the Himalayas, between Teesta and Mahananda.The sanctuary spans over 159 km^{2} (61 sq mi) of reserve forest. In 1959, it received the status of a sanctuary mainly to protect the Indian bison and the Bengal tiger. This sanctuary is home to rare mountain goat, chital, barking dear, fishing cat, sambar deer, tiger, elephant and Indian bison and migratory birds. It offers mild to medium trekking challenges at some points.

There are some important Hindu and Buddhists monuments in and around the city. Salugara Monastery is located 6 km (3.7 mi) away from Siliguri. The main attraction is the 100 ft (30 m) stupa, which is believed to be founded by the Tibetan Lama, Kalu Rinpoche. This tranquil location for meditation was established by Tibetan monks and followers of Dalai Lama. Sed-Gyued monastery is located near Salugara monastery. It is a breath-taking monument which was destroyed by the Chinese army, and then rebuilt. The monastery is home to more than 90 monks of the Gelukpa division, and is used as a research centre. Ewam India Buddhist Monastery is 11 km (6.8 mi) from Siliguri and is placed in the lap of nature near Bengal safari. The ISKCON temple in the city, also known as Sri Sri Radha Madhav Sundar Mandir locally, is one of the biggest Krishna centres in the North-Eastern region of India. The Sevoke Kali temple is an ancient temple on the banks of Teesta river close to the Coronation Bridge.This temple dedicated to Maa Kali, the Goddess of Destruction.

Siliguri also offers amusement and water parks to tourists and locals. Dreamland Amusement Park, located near Fulbari, 12 km (7.5 mi) from Siliguri junction, is an agricultural land converted in a fun house. It has 5-6 usual rides and a mini Ropeway. Savin Kingdom is an amusement and water park which is located near Dagapur in Siliguri. The water park has a pool, slides, artificial wave, and rain dance. It also has various joy rides like adrenaline junkies, sky train, break dance, go-carting, and artificial bulls, as well as a multiplex, kids zone, and restaurant.

The North Bengal Science Centre, established in 1997, is the only science centre in North Bengal. The main attractions are the Digital Planetarium, Science Shows, 3D Theatre, Taramandal Shows, science galleries and a green Science Park. The Hong Kong market is known as the Chandni Chowk of Northeast India, a street market with a variety of shops popping out on the alleyways.

== Notable people ==
- Saurav Bhadra - Indian film director and lyricist known for writing the title track of the film Ami Shudhu Cheyechi Tomay
- Anandamoy Bhattacharjee - Former chief justice of the Calcutta High Court.
- Ashok Bhattacharya - Ex Minister of Urban Development and Municipal Affairs.
- Ankita Das - Represented India at the 2012 Summer Olympics in Women's singles event in Table Tennis.
- Debabrata Das - Indian cricketer, who plays domestic cricket for Bengal cricket team and the IPL franchise Kolkata Knight Riders.
- Goutam Deb - Incumbent Mayor of Siliguri since February 2022, ex-Cabinet Minister of Department of Tourism, Government of West Bengal
- Mantu Ghosh - Indian table tennis player, two time national-level Champion and Arjuna Awardee.
- Richa Ghosh - Indian cricketer, 2025 Women's Cricket World Cup winner.
- Soumyajit Ghosh - Table tennis player and the youngest Indian to qualify for the London, 2012 Olympics. He also became the youngest national champion at the age of 19.
- Bappi Lahiri - Indian singer, composer and record producer.
- Charu Majumdar - Indian communist leader, founder, and General Secretary of the Communist Party of India (Marxist–Leninist).
- Sailendra Nath Roy - Guinness World Records holder for the farthest distance travelled on a zip wire and pulled 40 tonnes DHR toy train using hair.
- Nandita Saha - Table tennis player who was part of Indian trio, defeated Canada in Commonwealth 2006 at Melbourne and won bronze medal for India.
- Wriddhiman Saha - Retired Indian cricketer, who played First-class and Test cricket for the Indian national cricket team.

== See also ==
- Siliguri Jalpaiguri Development Authority
- Siliguri subdivision
- List of cities in West Bengal
- List of metropolitan area in West Bengal
