= New Jalpaiguri–Malda Town Express =

Train belonging to Indian Railways

New Jalpaiguri - Malda Town Express.

Overview
- Service type: Express
- Locale: West Bengal, Bihar
- First service: 2 November 2020; 5 years ago
- Current operator: Eastern Railway zone

Route
- Termini: New Jalpaiguri Junction; Malda Town
- Stops: 24
- Distance travelled: 235 km (146 mi)
- Service frequency: Daily
- Train number: 15710 / 15709

On-board services
- Classes: General unreserved Second sitting
- Seating arrangements: Yes
- Sleeping arrangements: Yes
- Catering facilities: No

Technical
- Rolling stock: Standard Indian Railways Coaches
- Track gauge: 1,676 mm (5 ft 6 in)
- Operating speed: 46 km/h (29 mph)

The 15709 / 10 New Jalpaiguri Malda Town Express is an Express train belonging to Indian Railways Eastern Railway zone that runs between New Jalpaiguri Junction and Malda Town of West Bengal in India.

It operates as train number 15709 from New Jalpaiguri Junction to Malda Town and as train number 15710 in the reverse direction serving the state of West Bengal and Bihar.

== Route ==
1. New Jalpaiguri (Siliguri) (Starts)
2. Rangapani
3. Chattarhat
4. Dumdangi
5. Tin Mile Hat
6. Mangurjan
7. Aluabari Road Junction
8. Kishanganj
9. Kanki
10. Surja Kamal
11. Dalkhola
12. Telta
13. Sudhani
14. Barsoi Junction
15. Mukuria
16. Azamnagar Road
17. Khurial
18. Kumedpur
19. Harischandrapur
20. Bhaluka Road
21. Samsi
22. Kumarganj
23. Eklakhi
24. Adina
25. Old Malda Junction
26. Malda Town (Ends)
