= Siliguri Town railway station =

Train station in West Bengal, India

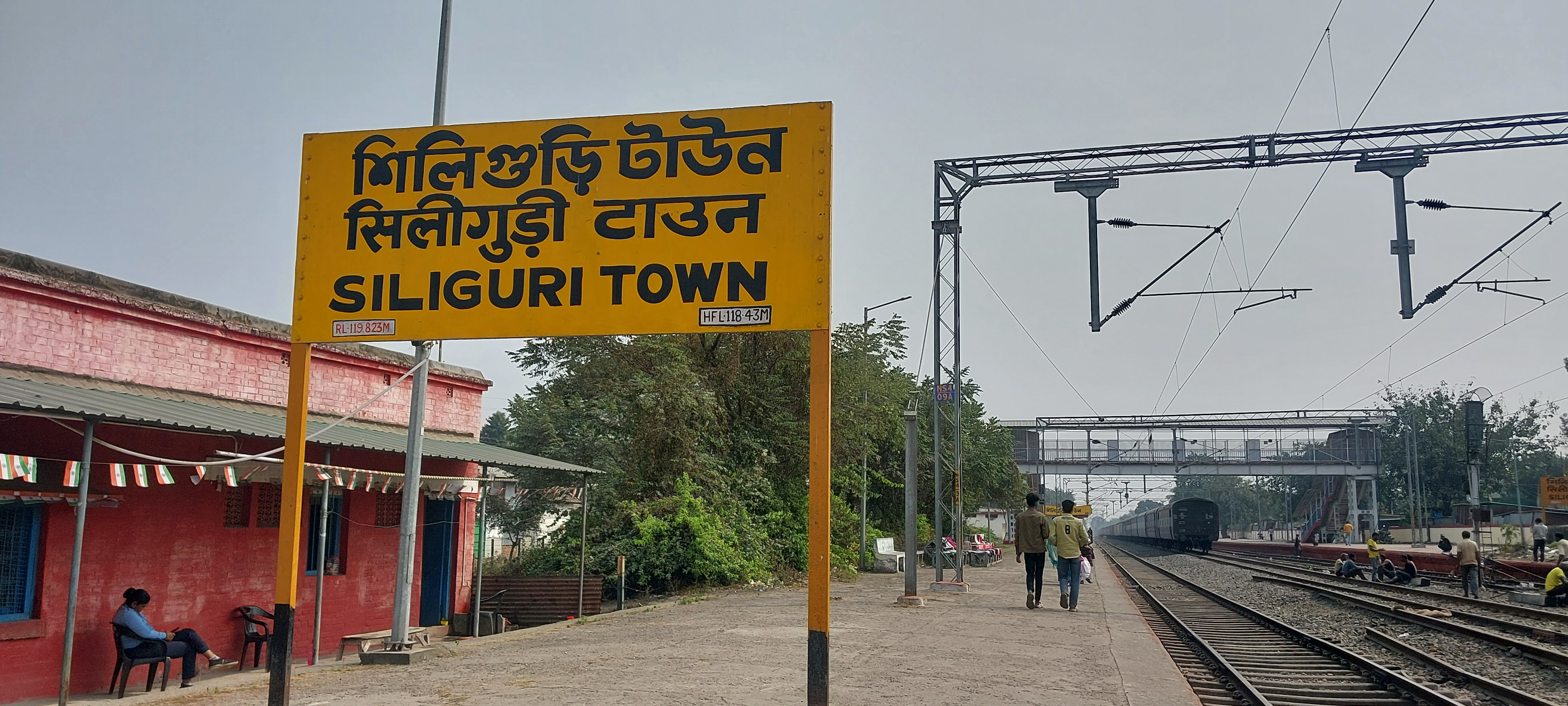
- Siliguri Town railway station

General information
- Location: Bagha Jatin Road, College Para, Siliguri, Distt:Darjeeling, West Bengal; India
- Coordinates: 26.7071°N 88.4292°E
- Elevation: 120 metres (390 ft)
- System: Passenger train station
- Owner: Indian Railways
- Operator: North East Frontier Railway
- Lines: New Jalpaiguri–Alipurduar–Samuktala Road line, Darjeeling Himalayan Railway
- Platforms: 3 [2 broad gauge and 1 narrow gauge]
- Tracks: 4
- Connections: Auto rickshaw, E-rickshaw, Bus, Taxi, Cabs

Construction
- Structure type: Standard at ground
- Parking: Available

Other information
- Status: Functioning
- Station code: SGUT
- Division(s): Katihar

History
- Opened: 1878; 148 years ago
- Electrified: Yes(From 2020)
- Former names: North Bengal State Railway Station
Location
- Location within West Bengal Location within India

Siliguri Town railway station serves Siliguri in Darjeeling district in the Indian state of West Bengal. The other important stations serving the metropolis are Siliguri Junction, Bagdogra, Gulma, Rangapani, Matigara and New Jalpaiguri Junction. This is a small station consisting of three platforms, among them two broad-gauge platforms and one narrow-gauge platform. The legendary 43 up and 44 dn Siliguri – Kolkata bound Darjeeling Mail has also started its first journey from this legendary station. This station is located almost at the centre of the city. It opened in 1878.

== History ==
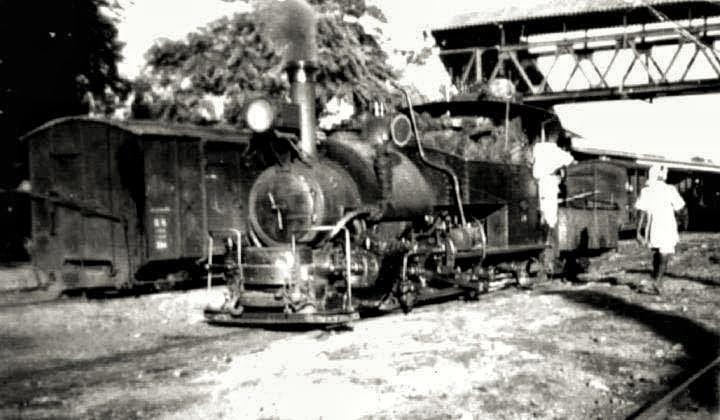
Siliguri Town railway station in 1881

In 1878, the railway line from Calcutta (later called Sealdah) station to Siliguri was in two stages – 5 ft 6 in (1,676 mm) broad gauge from Calcutta to Damookeah Ghat, on the southern bank of the Padma, across the river in a ferry and then 1,000 mm (3 ft 3 3/8 in) metre gauge to Siliguri. In 1881, the 610 mm (2 ft) narrow-gauge line from Siliguri to Darjeeling was added. In 1926, with the Hardinge Bridge in position, the entire Calcutta–Siliguri line was converted to 1,676 mm broad gauge and in 1947, following the partition of India the line was severed, as a major portion of the line ran through East Pakistan.

In the post-partition era, with makeshift arrangements via Barsoi and Kishanganj being metre gauge and narrow gauge, the focus shifted in 1949 to a new Siliguri Junction railway station and later still, in 1961 to the new broad-gauge station at New Jalpaiguri.

== Trains ==
Mostly unreserved trains along with some important trains like Jogbani–Siliguri Town Intercity Express etc are available at this station.

Preceding station	Indian Railways	Following station
New Jalpaiguri towards ?	Northeast Frontier Railway zone New Jalpaiguri–Alipurduar–Samuktala Road line	Siliguri Junction towards ?
New Jalpaiguri towards Darjeeling	Darjeeling Himalayan Railway Siliguri–Darjeeling narrow-gauge line	Siliguri Junction towards New Jalpaiguri Junction
