= Siliguri Junction–Rangtong Evening Safari =

Express trains with Vistadome carriages

Overview
- Service type: Tourist Train
- Locale: West Bengal
- First service: 31 August 2021
- Current operator: Northeast Frontier Railways

Route
- Termini: Siliguri Junction; 26.7234°N 88.4138°E; Siliguri Junction; 26.7234°N 88.4138°E
- Stops: 05
- Distance travelled: 32.4 km (20 mi)
- Average journey time: 3 hrs 03 mins
- Service frequency: Daily
- Train number: 52556

On-board services
- Class: First Class (FC)
- Seating arrangements: Yes
- Sleeping arrangements: No
- Catering facilities: No
- Baggage facilities: Available

Technical
- Rolling stock: ICF coach
- Track gauge: 610 mm (2 ft); Narrow gauge
- Operating speed: Avg. Speed – 10km/hr

Siliguri Junction–Rangtong Evening Safari was a narrow-gauge tourist special steam engine powered train in India that does a round trip between Siliguri Junction and Rangtong and back to Siliguri in the Indian state of West Bengal. The train belongs to the Northeast Frontier Railway zone of Indian Railways. The service was officially started from 31 August 2021 from Siliguri Junction. The train was cancelled in March 2022, due to poor occupancy and has not restarted since.

== Route ==
The train starts its journey from Platform number 01 (narrow gauge) of Siliguri Junction at 14:45 and reaches Sukna railway station at 15:20 after a ten-minute halt it continues its journey and reaches Rangtong at 16:20. For reverse direction, the train starts from Rangtong at 16:40 and reaches Sukna railway station at 17:20. After a five-minute, halt it again travels from Sukna and reaches Siliguri Junction at 18:05. Through its journey through narrow gauge, the train passes through beautiful Mahananda Wildlife Sanctuary, tea gardens, hills, valleys, rivers etc. It provides once in a lifetime experience for the travellers in the steam engine powered train. The train runs entirely in Darjeeling district of West Bengal.

== Traction ==
The train is hauled by Steam Engine of Darjeeling Loco Shed for its entire journey.

== Loco reversal ==
The train reverses its direction in Rangtong Railway station.

== See also ==
- New Jalpaiguri–Alipurduar Tourist Special
