= Bagdogra railway station =

Railway station in India

Bagdogra বাগডোগরা
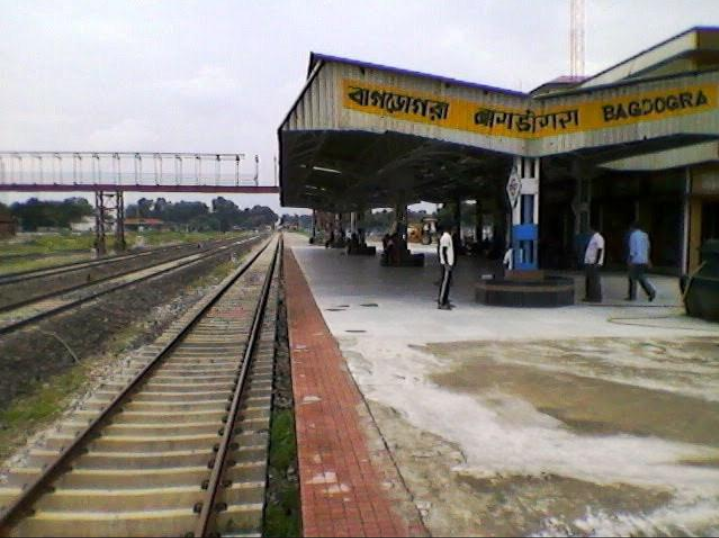
- Bagdogra Railway Station

General information
- Location: North bengal road (National highway 31), near Bagdogra airport, Darjeeling district, West Bengal; India
- Coordinates: 26.7071°N 88.4292°E
- Elevation: 120 metres (390 ft)
- System: Passenger train station
- Owner: Indian Railways
- Operator: North East Frontier Railway
- Line: Katihar–Siliguri line
- Platforms: 6 [5 broad gauge and 1 metre gauge]
- Tracks: 8
- Connections: Auto rickshaw, E-rickshaw, Bus, Taxi, Cabs, bike taxi

Construction
- Structure type: Standard at ground
- Parking: Available
- Accessible: Yes

Other information
- Status: Functioning
- Station code: BORA
- Zone(s): Northeast Frontier Railway
- Division(s): Katihar

History
- Opened: 1949; 77 years ago
- Electrified: electrification completed
- Former names: North Bengal State Railway
Location
- Location within West Bengal Location within India

Bagdogra Railway Station is one of the railway stations that serves Western Siliguri Metropolitan Areas in Darjeeling district in the Indian state of West Bengal. The other stations are: Siliguri Junction, New Jalpaiguri, Siliguri Town, Gulma, Rangapani and Matigara. This station has five broad-gauge platforms and one metre-gauge platform. This station lies in Katihar–Siliguri line and New Jalpaiguri - Thakurganj Line Via Bagdogra and Rangapani . It is located at 12 km (7.5 mi) from Siliguri city centre and 4.6 km (2.9 mi) from Bagdogra Airport.

Note: - Every train that departs from and arrives at Siliguri Junction, have a stoppage at this Station except Paharia Express.
