= Siliguri Junction railway station =

Railway Station in West Bengal, India

Siliguri Junction
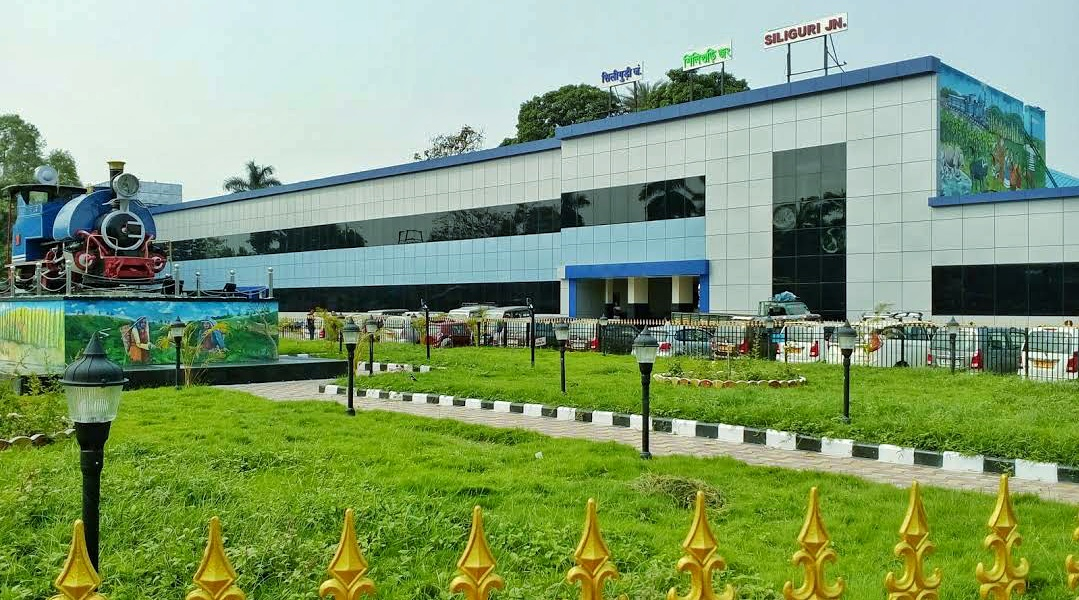
- Siliguri Junction Railway Station Complex

General information
- Location: Hill Cart Road, Pradhan Nagar, Siliguri–734001, Darjeeling district, West Bengal; India
- Coordinates: 26.7234°N 88.4138°E
- Elevation: 120 metres (390 ft)
- System: Regional rail & Commuter rail station
- Owner: Indian Railways
- Operator: Northeast Frontier Railways
- Lines: New Jalpaiguri–Alipurduar–Samuktala Road line; Darjeeling Himalayan Railway; Katihar–Siliguri line
- Platforms: 5 Broad-gauge; 1 Narrow-gauge
- Tracks: 10

Construction
- Structure type: At grade
- Parking: Available
- Cycle facilities: Available
- Accessible: Yes

Other information
- Status: Functioning
- Station code: SGUJ
- Zone(s): Northeast Frontier Railway
- Division(s): Katihar

History
- Opened: 1949; 77 years ago
- Electrified: January 10, 2020; 6 years ago

Passengers
- 50,000/Day (▲ high)
Location
- Location within West Bengal

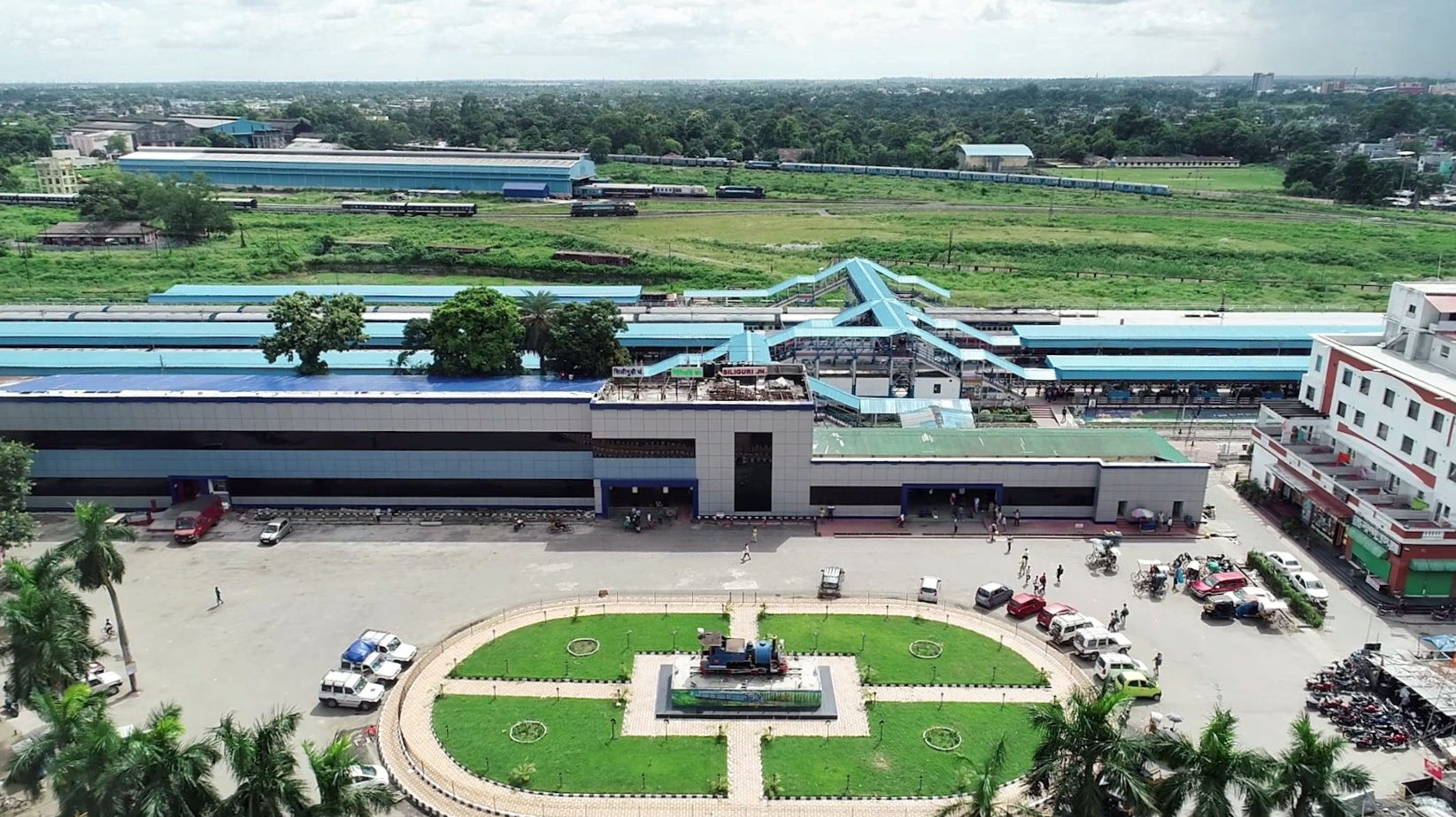
Siliguri Junction in bird's eye view

Siliguri Junction (station code:- SGUJ) is one of the major and second largest railway station that serve the city of Siliguri located in Darjeeling district in the Indian state of West Bengal. The station has two types of gauges visible i.e. 1,676 mm (5 ft 6 in) broad gauge, and 610 mm (2 ft) narrow-gauge tracks for Darjeeling Himalayan Railway. It was opened in 1949. It formerly had the distinction of having three gauges visible but the metre-gauge line from Aluabari Road to Siliguri Junction was converted later into broad gauge. A few years ago, the trains used to run between Siliguri Junction to Naksalbari on the metre-gauge line. Siliguri Junction lies on three railway lines New Jalpaiguri–Alipurduar–Samuktala Road line, Katihar–Siliguri line and Darjeeling Himalayan Railway Line. This railway station also has its own locomotive shed i.e Diesel Loco Shed, Siliguri

== History ==
With the railway routes badly disturbed by the partition of India in 1947, Siliguri Town railway station suddenly lost its preeminence as the broad-gauge link to Calcutta running across East Pakistan. With three metre-gauge lines, the new Siliguri Junction railway station became the main railway station in the area. The three metre-gauge lines were linked to Kishanganj and Barsoi, Assam and Haldibari. The narrow gauge Darjeeling Himalayan Railway was there. The short reign was over in the 1960s when a new broad-gauge line linked Siliguri with Calcutta, and subsequently, all railway lines in the area (excepting Darjeeling Himalayan Railway) were converted to broad gauge. The focus shifted in 1960 to a brand new broad-gauge station at New Jalpaiguri.

== Connections ==
Multiple trains from Siliguri Junction connects to many destinations across India. Trains like

- SMVT Bengaluru–Alipurduar Amrit Bharat Express connects Siliguri Junction with Bangalore via cities like Tirupati, Vellore, Vijayawada, Visakhapatnam, Rajahmundry, Vizianagaram, Nellore, Ongole, Eluru etc, Similarly
- Panvel–Alipurduar Amrit Bharat Express and
- Lokmanya Tilak Terminus–Kamakhya Karmabhoomi Express connects Siliguri Junction to Mumbai via Nagpur, Kalyan, Bhusaval, Itarsi, Jabalpur, Katni, Raipur, Tatanagar, Bilaspur, Rourkela, Bongaigaon, Kamakhya etc.
- Puri Kamakhya Express via Howrah connects Siliguri Junction with Kolkata, Bhubaneswar, Cuttack, Kharagpur and Puri, while
- Kanchan Kanya Express connects Siliguri Junction with Kolkata daily via Bardhaman, Farakka , Malda etc,
- Kamakhya–Ara Junction Capital Express and
- New Jalpaiguri-Ara Junction Capital Express connects with Patna, Katihar, Ara. Trains like
- Ranchi–Kamakhya Express connects with Ranchi, the capital of Jharkhand and cities like Dhanbad, Asansol, Durgapur etc, while trains like
- New Jalpaiguri–Amritsar Amrit Bharat Express connects Siliguri Junction directly with Amritsar via Gorakhpur, Ludhiana, Ambala, Jalandhar, Bareilly, Sitamarhi, Raxaul, Saharanpur, Moradabad etc.
- Sikkim Mahananda Express connects Siliguri Junction with India's capital Delhi via Kanpur, Prayagraj, Aligarh, Buxar, Barauni etc. Scenic Trains like
- New Jalpaiguri–Alipurduar Tourist Express and
- Darjeeling Himalayan Railway connecting cities like Malbazar, Kurseong, Darjeeling, Birpara, Alipurduar etc are also available from Siliguri Junction. Further trains like
- Siliguri Town - Jogbani Express,
- Siliguri Junction - Balurghat Express,
- Siliguri Junction - Alipurduar Express,
- Siliguri Junction - Dhubri Express,
- Siliguri Junction - Bamanhat Express,
- Siliguri Junction - Radhikapur Express,
- Siliguri Junction - Katihar Express connects Siliguri Junction with cities like Purnia, Katihar, Balurghat, Raiganj, Cooch Behar, Araria, Alipurduar, Barsoi, Dhubri, Birpara, etc. Tourist trains like
- Siliguri Junction–Rangtong Evening Safari originates from Siliguri Junction and runs on Narrow gauge towards Sukna railway station, Sukna and Rangtong.

== Amenities ==
Amenities at Siliguri Junction include: Waiting room, Retiring room, Tourist Information Centre, Book stalls and some variety stores. Tenzing Norgay central bus terminal and SNT Siliguri bus stand are located just outside this railway station and West Bengal Tourism Office is also located nearby.

== City transportation ==
=== Buses ===
The North Bengal State Transport Corporation operates bus services from Siliguri Junction railway station to Siliguri city and suburban areas, Also private buses runs between all over the city from Siliguri Junction railway station. The Tenzing Norgay Central Bus Terminus and SNT Siliguri Bus Terminus are just opposite to each other besides Siliguri junction railway station, so long-route buses are available from these terminus.

=== Cars ===
Siliguri junction railway station is located in the middle of the Siliguri city, so it is very easy to reach the railway station.

Ride aggregator services Uber, Rapido, Ola provide rides from the train station to various parts of the city. One can also book private cabs to go Darjeeling, Gangtok and all over hill areas. Apart from these numerous private taxi operators provide pre-paid and post-paid taxi services to the city. E-rickshaw, City auto facilities are available in the station.

== Diesel loco shed ==
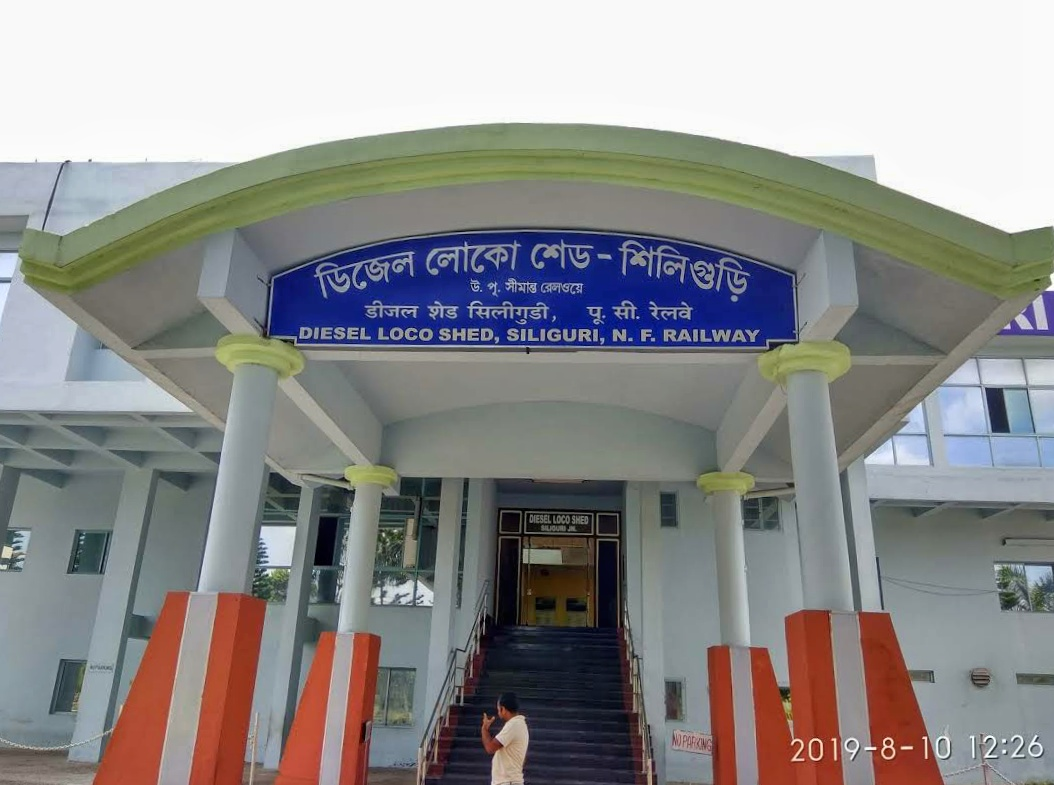
Siliguri diesel loco shed.

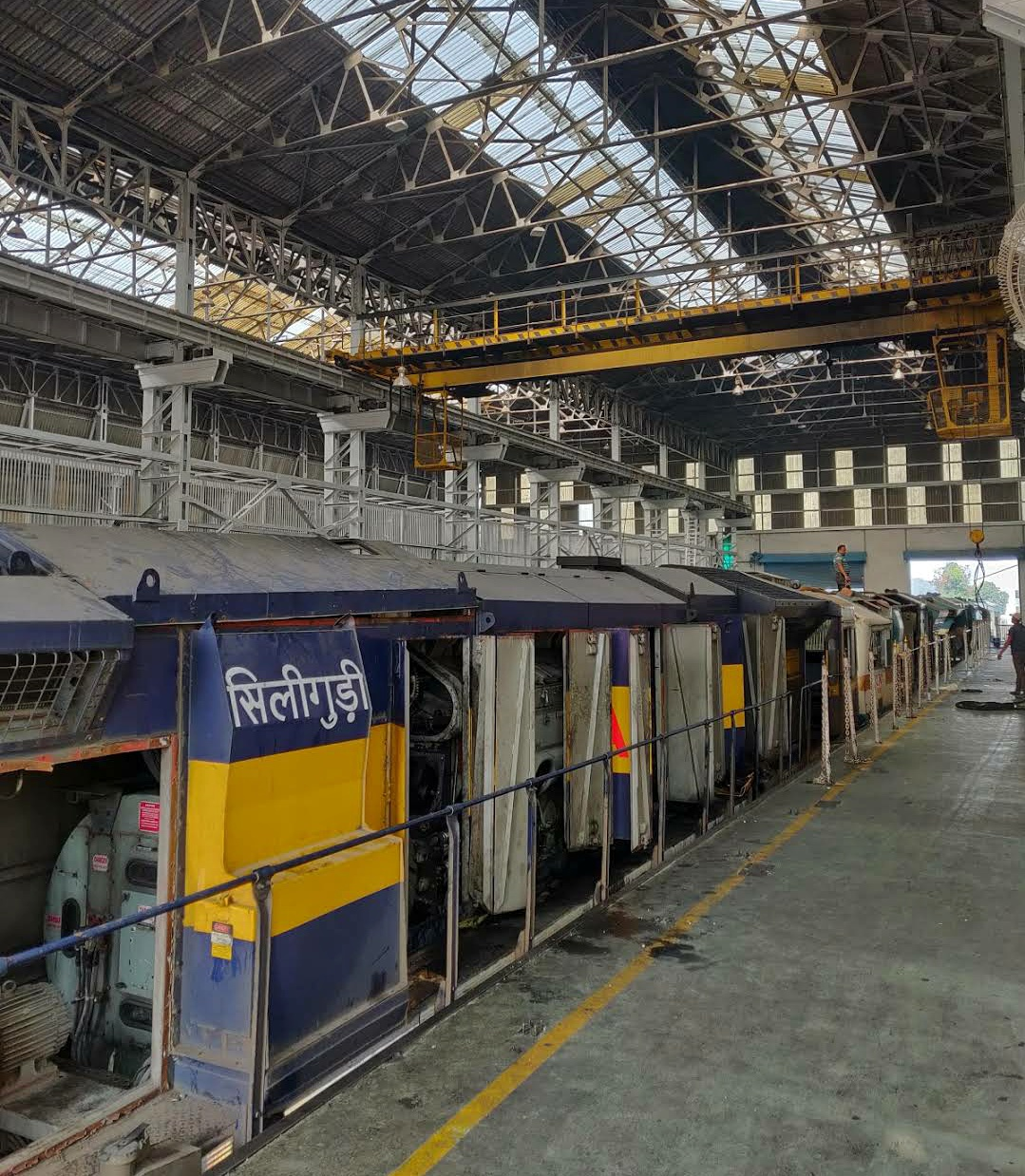
Inside loco shed

Diesel Loco Shed, Siliguri was established at Siliguri in 1961 and a new broad-gauge diesel loco shed was established in 2007. WDP 4 and WDG 4 locos were transferred from Hubli. It is home to the WDP-4 loco "Baaz". Nowadays it is also holds WDP 4B, WDP 4D and WDG 4D locomotives.

== See also ==
- North Eastern Railway Connectivity Project
- North Western Railway zone
- Siliguri Town railway station
- New Jalpaiguri Junction railway station

Preceding station	Indian Railways	Following station
Siliguri Town towards ?	Northeast Frontier Railway zone New Jalpaiguri–Alipurduar–Samuktala Road line	Gulma towards ?
Siliguri Town towards Darjeeling	Darjeeling Himalayan Railway Siliguri–Darjeeling light railway	Sukna towards New Jalpaiguri Junction
Terminus	Northeast Frontier Railway zone Katihar–Siliguri line	Matigara towards ?
Terminus	Northeast Frontier Railway zone Siliguri–Bagdogra metre-gauge line	Matigara towards ?
