= 2024 West Bengal train collision =

Railway accident in West Bengal, India

West Bengal train collision
- Crash location on a map of India

Details
- Date: 17 June 2024 around 9:00 IST
- Location: Near Rangapani railway station, Darjeeling district, West Bengal
- Coordinates: 26.66°N 88.38°E
- Country: India
- Line: Katihar–Siliguri line
- Operator: Indian Railways
- Owner: Government of India
- Incident type: Rear-End Collision, derailment
- Cause: Under investigation

Statistics
- Trains: 2 trains: A goods train carrying containers (Train No. GFCJ); Kanchanjunga Express (Passenger Train No. 13174) between Agartala and Sealdah
- Vehicles: WAG-9 and WAP-7 locomotive
- Deaths: 11
- Injured: 60+

On 17 June 2024, two trains collided in Darjeeling district in the Indian state of West Bengal. A goods train collided with Sealdah–Agartala Kanchanjunga Express, a passenger train near Rangapani railway station. About 11 people were killed and more than 60 were injured in the accident.

== Crash ==
On 17 June 2024, Kanchanjunga Express (Train No. 13174), a passenger train with Sealdah-based WAP-7 was traveling from Agartala in Tripura to Sealdah in West Bengal. The train had left New Jalpaiguri Junction, crossed Rangapani railway station, a non-stopping station at 8:27 IST and stopped some distance before the Chatterhat railway station on the Katihar–Siliguri line, waiting for clearance to proceed further. At 8:45, a goods train carrying containers (Train no: GFCJ) with WAG-9 electric locomotive crossed the Rangapani station and was proceeding on the same line. At 8:55, the goods train rammed the stationary passenger train from behind, causing three coaches of the Kanchenjunga Express to derail.

== Victims ==
Ten people were killed and more than 60 were injured in the collision. The loco pilots of the goods train and the train manager of Kanchanjungha Express were amongst those killed. More than 60 people were injured and the injured were treated at North Bengal Medical College at Siliguri.

== Aftermath ==
The Railways minister, Ashwini Vaishnaw visited the site to oversee the response. The Ministry of Railways announced a compensation of ₹10 lakh (US$10,000) for the dead, ₹2.5 lakh (US$2,600) for those seriously injured and ₹50,000 (US$520) for those with minor injuries. Prime Minister of India Narendra Modi announced a compensation of ₹2 lakh (US$2,100) for the dead and ₹50,000 (US$520) for the injured from the Prime Minister's National Relief Fund (PMNRF). Chief Minister of Tripura Manik Saha announced a compensation of ₹2 lakh (US$2,100) for the victims who were from Tripura.

More than 19 trains were cancelled and 22 train were diverted in the aftermath of the crash. Rail traffic on the line towards Guwahati resumed in the evening on the same day and the other line was restored on the morning of 18 June.

== Causes ==
The chairman of the Railway Board said that the operator of the goods train ignored multiple red signals, which might have caused the crash. The train operators union criticised the statement as premature. Railway sources said the cause of the incident may have been a faulty automatic signal, which was defective since 5:50 IST. The trains were not equipped with Kavach, a collision avoidance system designed by Indian Railways.

Preliminary investigation revealed that the trains were issued manual clearances called TA 912 by the station master of the Rangapani station to ignore the faulty signals. The passenger train had traveled some distance from the station and was stationery on the track, awaiting further clearance. In case of a signal failure, Indian railway rules (GS&R 9.02) stipulate that the loco pilots should operate at speeds less than 10 km/h (6.2 mph), wait for one minute at each red signal and ensure that the track is visually clear for at least 150 m (490 ft) before proceeding. A T/A 912 clearance is typically granted when there are no other obstructions present along the section and is used to override the stipulated rules. Hence, the manual clearance issued to the goods train placed it on a collision course with the stationary passenger train and excessive speed was also considered as a contributing factor to the eventual accident. On 21 June 2024, East Central Railway banned the issuance of T/A 912 until further notice.

== Reactions ==
Indian President Draupadi Murmu said she would pray for the speedy recovery of the injured. On 17 June, Prime Minister Modi offered his condolences and said that rescue operations were underway. Congress leader Mallikarjun Kharge offered his condolences and criticised the central government for mismanaging the ministry of railways. Railway minister Ashwini Vaishnaw said that a thorough investigation would be conducted. West Bengal Chief Minister Mamata Banerjee said that the state is helping with the rescue operations and criticised the central government for not focusing on passenger safety.

== See also ==
- List of rail accidents (2020–present)
- List of railway accidents and incidents in India
- 2023 Odisha train collision
