= KKA =

KKA or kka may refer to:

- Kakanda language, a Nupoid language of Nigeria (by ISO 639-3 code)
- Kanki railway station, West Bengal, India (by Indian Railways station code)
- Kazan Air Enterprise, Russian airline (by ICAO code)
- Koyuk Alfred Adams Airport, near Koyuk, Alaska (by IATA and FAA code)
