= Dhulabari railway station =

Railway station in Bihar, India

General information
- Location: Pamal, Dhulabari, Kishanganj district, Bihar; India
- Coordinates: 26°18′37″N 88°12′13″E
- Elevation: 67 m (220 ft)
- System: Passenger train station
- Owner: Indian Railways
- Operator: Northeast Frontier Railway
- Line: Howrah–New Jalpaiguri line
- Platforms: 2
- Tracks: 2

Construction
- Structure type: Standard (on ground station)

Other information
- Status: Active
- Station code: DBQ
- Zone(s): Northeast Frontier Railway
- Division(s): Katihar

History
- Former names: East Indian Railway Company

Services
Preceding station	Indian Railways	Following station
Mangurjan towards ?	Eastern Railway zone Howrah–New Jalpaiguri line	Aluabari Road Junction towards ?
Location

Dhulabari railway station (station code: DBQ), is a railway station on Katihar–Siliguri branch of Howrah–New Jalpaiguri line in the Katihar railway division of Northeast Frontier Railway zone. It is situated at Pamal, Dhulabari of Kishanganj district in the Indian state of Bihar.

The station is served by a double-track electric rail line.
