= Hatwar railway station =

Railway station in West Bengal

General information
- Location: National Highway 31, Pachim Lahil, Hatwar, Uttar Dinajpur district, West Bengal; India
- Coordinates: 26°02′42″N 87°53′35″E
- Elevation: 46 m (151 ft)
- System: Passenger train station
- Owner: Indian Railways
- Operator: Northeast Frontier Railway
- Line: Howrah–New Jalpaiguri line
- Platforms: 2
- Tracks: 2

Construction
- Structure type: Standard (on ground station)

Other information
- Status: Active
- Station code: HWR
- Zone(s): Northeast Frontier Railway
- Division(s): Katihar

History
- Former names: East Indian Railway Company

Services
| Preceding station | Indian Railways | Following station |
|---|---|---|
| Tauheed towards ? | Eastern Railway zone Howrah–New Jalpaiguri line | Kanki towards ? |
Location

Hatwar railway station is a railway station on Katihar–Siliguri branch of Howrah–New Jalpaiguri line in the Katihar railway division of Northeast Frontier Railway zone. It is situated beside National Highway 31, Pachim Lahil, Hatwar of Uttar Dinajpur district in the Indian state of West Bengal.
