= Nijbari railway station =

Railway station in West Bengal

General information
- Location: Fulbari Ghoshpukur Bypass, Nijbari, Darjeeling district, West Bengal; India
- Coordinates: 26°36′27″N 88°20′42″E
- Elevation: 105 m (344 ft)
- System: Passenger train station
- Owner: Indian Railways
- Operator: Northeast Frontier Railway
- Line: Howrah–New Jalpaiguri line
- Platforms: 2
- Tracks: 2

Construction
- Structure type: Standard (on ground station)

Other information
- Status: Active
- Station code: NJB
- Zone(s): Northeast Frontier Railway
- Division(s): Katihar

History
- Former names: East Indian Railway Company

Services
Preceding station	Indian Railways	Following station
Rangapani towards ?	Eastern Railway zone Howrah–New Jalpaiguri line	Chattarhat towards ?
Location

Nijbari railway station is a railway station on Katihar–Siliguri branch of Howrah–New Jalpaiguri line in the Katihar railway division of Northeast Frontier Railway zone. It is situated beside Fulbari Ghoshpukur Bypass, Mahipal at Nijbari of Darjeeling district in the Indian state of West Bengal.
