= Matigara railway station =

Train station in West Bengal, India

Matigara মাটিগাড়া
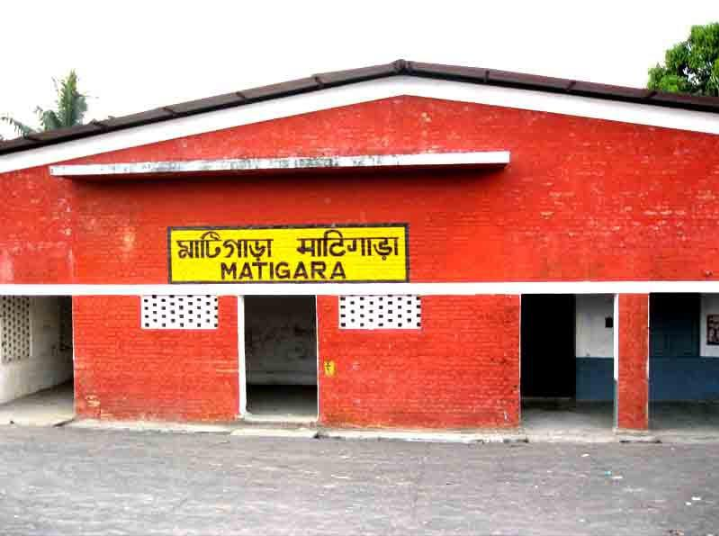

General information
- Location: Asian highway 02, National highway 31, near Matigara Bazar, Darjeeling, West Bengal; India
- Coordinates: 26.7178317°N 88.3847761°E
- Elevation: 120 metres (390 ft)
- System: Passenger train station
- Owner: Indian Railways
- Operator: North East Frontier Railway
- Line: Katihar–Siliguri line
- Platforms: 1 [1 broad gauge and 1 metre gauge]
- Tracks: 2
- Connections: Auto rickshaw, E-Rikshaw, Bus, Taxi, Cabs, bike taxi

Construction
- Structure type: Standard at ground
- Parking: Available
- Accessible: No

Other information
- Status: Not Functioning [Grade O]
- Station code: MTRA
- Zone(s): Northeast Frontier Railway
- Division(s): Katihar

History
- Opened: 1949; 77 years ago
- Electrified: Yes (2023)
- Former names: North Bengal State Railway
Location
- Location within West Bengal Location within India

Matigara Railway Station is one of the railway stations that serve Siliguri in Darjeeling district in the Indian state of West Bengal. The other stations are: Siliguri Junction, New Jalpaiguri, Siliguri Town, Gulma, Rangapani and Bagdogra. This is a small station consisting of three platforms, among them one 5 ft 6 in (1,676 mm) broad gauge platforms and one metre gauge platform. It is located at 6.2 km (3.9 mi) from Siliguri city centre and 10 km (6.2 mi) from Bagdogra Airport.

== Trains ==
The train operation in this station is now closed for upgradation. But in the past time some local trains are stopped here. Few years ago, Train Bus is running from Siliguri to Naxalbari is halt here but now due to less passenger, this Train Bus service also closed. Now Indian railway department is monitoring to develop the station and after that again start local train service from this station.
