= New Jalpaiguri–Amritsar Amrit Bharat Express =

Amrit Bharat Express train route in India

Overview
- Service type: Amrit Bharat Express, Superfast
- Status: Active
- Locale: West Bengal, Bihar, Uttar Pradesh, Haryana and Punjab
- First service: 14 May 2026; 5 months ago (Inaugural); 16 May 2026; 5 months ago (Commercial)
- Current operator: Northeast Frontier Railways (NFR)

Route
- Termini: New Jalpaiguri Junction (NJP); Amritsar Junction (ASR)
- Stops: 37
- Distance travelled: 1,851 km (1,150 mi)
- Average journey time: 42 hrs 20 mins
- Service frequency: Weekly
- Train number: 14663/14664
- Lines used: Katihar–Siliguri line; Araria–Thakurganj–Galgalia railway line; Saharsa–Forbesganj line; Samastipur–Muzaffarpur line; Raxaul-Sitamarhi line; Raxaul–Narkatiaganj–Gorakhpur line; Gorakhpur–Barhni line Towards (Gonda Junction), (Sitapur Junction); Shahjahanpur–Bareilly–Moradabad line; Moradabad–Ambala line towards → (Saharanpur Junction); Ambala–Ludhiana line Towards → Main line Jalandhar City Junction; Amritsar Junction

On-board services
- Class: Sleeper class coach (SL) General unreserved coach (GS)
- Seating arrangements: Yes
- Sleeping arrangements: Yes
- Auto-rack arrangements: Upper
- Catering facilities: No
- Observation facilities: Saffron-grey
- Entertainment facilities: Electric outlets; Reading lights; Bottle holder
- Other facilities: CCTV cameras; Bio-vacuum toilets; Foot-operated water taps; Passenger information system

Technical
- Rolling stock: Modified LHB coaches
- Track gauge: Indian gauge
- Electrification: 25 kV 50 Hz AC overhead line
- Operating speed: 42 km (26 mi) (Avg.)
- Track owner: Indian Railways
- Rake maintenance: Amritsar Junction (ASR)
- Rake sharing: No
Route map
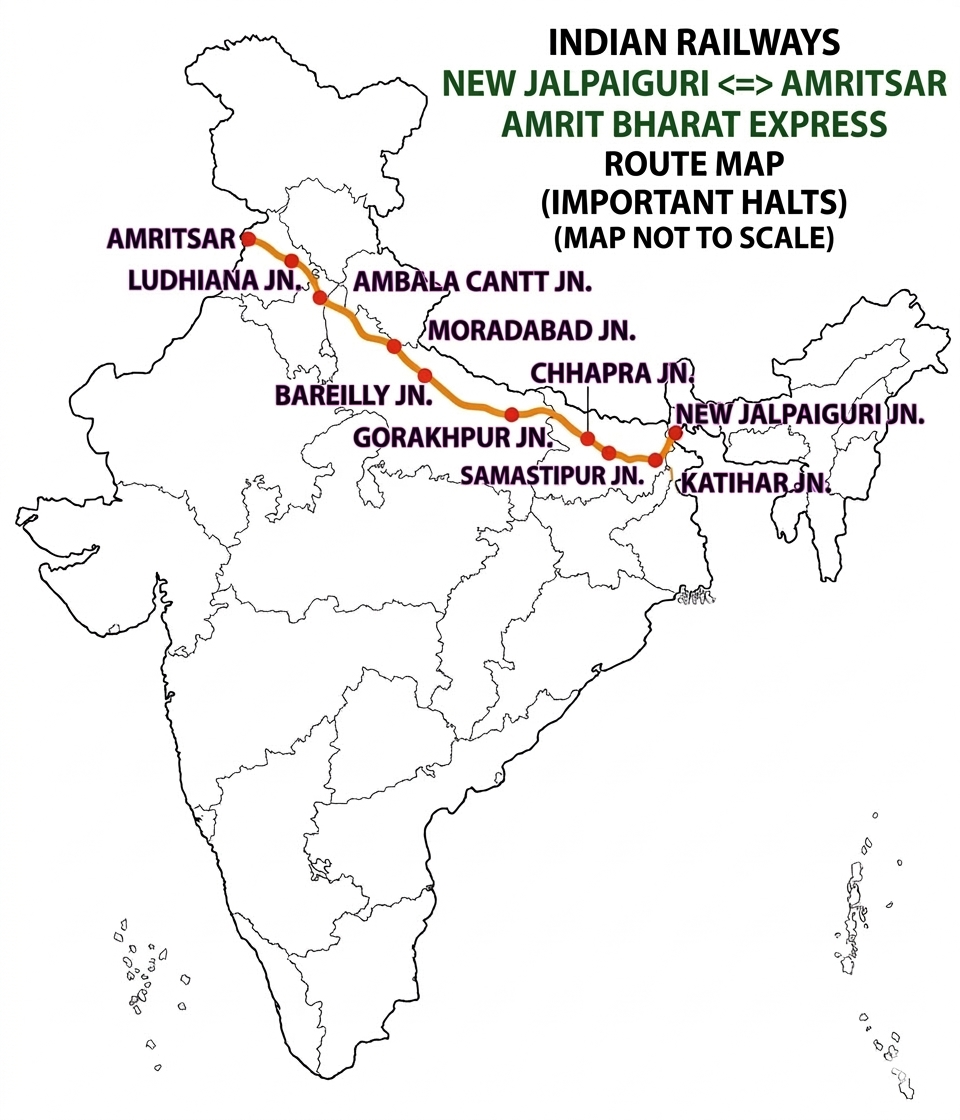

The 14663/14664 New Jalpaiguri–Amritsar Amrit Bharat Express is India's 34th Non-AC Superfast Amrit Bharat Express train, which runs across the states of West Bengal, Bihar, Uttar Pradesh, Haryana and Punjab by connecting New Jalpaiguri Junction of Siliguri the Gateway of Northeast India city in West Bengal with Amritsar Junction of Amritsar the Holy Golden Temple city of Punjab.

The express train is inaugurated on 2026 by Honorable Prime Minister Narendra Modi through video conference.

== Overview ==
The train is operated by Indian Railways, connecting New Jalpaiguri Junction and Amritsar Junction. It is currently operated 14663/14664 on weekly basis.

== Rakes ==
It is the 34th Amrit Bharat 2.0 Express train in which the locomotives were designed by Chittaranjan Locomotive Works (CLW) at Chittaranjan, West Bengal and the coaches were designed and manufactured by the Integral Coach Factory at Perambur, Chennai under the Make in India Initiative.

== Schedule ==
Train Schedule: New Jalpaiguri ↔ Amritsar Amrit Bharat Express
Train No.	Station Code	Departure Station	Departure Time	Departure Day	Arrival Station	Arrival Hours
14663	NJP	New Jalpaiguri Junction	08:05 AM	Amritsar Junction	02:20 AM	42h 15m
14664	ASR	Amritsar Junction	12:45 PM	New Jalpaiguri Junction	04:00 AM	39h 15m

== Routes and halts ==
The important halts of the train are :

- New Jalpaiguri Junction
- Siliguri Junction
- Bagdogra
- Thakurganj
- Araria
- Forbesganj
- Narpatganj
- Raghopur
- Saraigarh Junction
- Nirmali
- Jhanjharpur
- Sakri Junction
- Shisho Halt
- Kamataul
- Janakpur Road
- Sitamarhi
- Bairgania
- Raxaul Junction
- Sikta
- Narkatiaganj Junction
- Siswa Bazar
- Kaptanganj Junction
- Gorakhpur Junction
- Anand Nagar Junction
- Siddharthnagar
- Barhni
- Balrampur
- Gonda Junction
- Sitapur Junction
- Shahjahanpur
- Bareilly Junction
- Moradabad Junction
- Saharanpur Junction
- Ambala Cantt Junction
- Ludhiana Junction
- Jalandhar City Junction
- Amritsar Junction

== Rake reversal or rake share ==
No rake reversal or rake share.

== See also ==
- Amrit Bharat Express
- Vande Bharat Sleeper Express
- Vande Bharat Express
- Uday Express
- Humsafar Express

== Notes ==
a. Runs 2 day in a week with both directions.
