= Adhikari railway station =

Railway station in West Bengal, India

General information
- Location: Adhikari, Darjeeling, West Bengal; India
- Coordinates: 26.5767°N 88.1699°E
- Elevation: 100 metres (330 ft)
- System: Indian Railways station
- Owner: Indian Railways
- Operator: Northeast Frontier Railway
- Line: Katihar–Siliguri line
- Platforms: 1
- Tracks: 4 (Single Electric Line BG)
- Train operators: Indian Railways (Katihar Division)
- Connections: Auto stand

Construction
- Structure type: Standard (on-ground station)
- Parking: No
- Cycle facilities: No
- Accessible: Yes

Other information
- Status: Functioning
- Station code: ADQ
- Zone(s): Northeast Frontier Railway
- Division(s): Katihar
- Fare zone: NFR
Location
- Location within West Bengal Location within India

Adhikari railway station is a small railway station in Darjeeling district, West Bengal which lies on Katihar–Siliguri line. Its code is ADQ. It serves Adhikari town. The station consists of two platforms, which are not well sheltered. It lacks many facilities, including water and sanitation.

== Major trains ==
Some of the important trains that run from Adhikari are:

- Balurghat–Siliguri Intercity Express
- Siliguri Junction - Radhikapur Express
- Siliguri - Katihar Intercity Express (via Purnea)
- Siliguri-Katihar Intercity Express (via Barsoi)
- Siliguri–Katihar Passenger (unreserved)
- Radhikapur–Siliguri DEMU
- Siliguri Jn.–Malda Court DMU
