= Gulma railway station =

Railway station in West Bengal

Gulma গুলমা

General information
- Location: Station Rd, Kherjhora Forest Village, North Siliguri, Dist- Darjeeling- West Bengal 734003; India
- Coordinates: 26.8061120°N 88.3964423°E
- Elevation: 163 metres (535 ft)
- System: Indian Railways station
- Owner: Indian Railways
- Operator: Northeast Frontier
- Line: New Jalpaiguri–Alipurduar–Samuktala Road line
- Platforms: 2
- Tracks: 4

Construction
- Structure type: At grade
- Parking: Yes

Other information
- Status: Open
- Station code: GLMA
- Zone(s): Northeast Frontier Railway
- Division(s): Alipurduar
Location
- Location within West Bengal Location within India

Gulma railway Station is a small railway station, which serves Northern regions of Siliguri Metropolitan Areas like Sukna, Milan More, Debidanga, Kherjhora, Anchal, Champasari, Sisabari, Babubasa etc., in Siliguri, West Bengal. It is 10 km away from Siliguri Junction. It lies in New Jalpaiguri–Alipurduar–Samuktala Road line of Northeast Frontier Railway, Alipurduar railway division. The station lies near the Mahananda Wildlife Sanctuary. The other stations serving Siliguri are Siliguri Junction, Siliguri Town, Bagdogra, Matigara and New Jalpaiguri.

== Trains ==
Some important trains like

- New Jalpaiguri–Alipurduar Tourist Express
- Siliguri–Alipurduar Intercity Express
- Siliguri–Dhubri Intercity Express
- Siliguri Bamanhat Intercity Express

Other local trains like

- Alipurduar–New Jalpaiguri Passenger
- Bamanhat–Siliguri Passenger
- Dinhata–Siliguri DEMU
- Siliguri-New Bongaigaon DEMU
- New Cooch Behar–Siliguri Jn DEMU (via Changrabandha)
- New Jalpaiguri–Alipurduar Passenger special
- Bamanhat - Siliguri Junction DEMU
- Bamanhat - Siliguri Junction DEMU Special
- New Bongaigaon - Siliguri Jn. DEMU Special (via Dhubri - Mathabhanga)

are available from this station.
