= Tauheed railway station =

Railway station in Bihar

General information
- Location: National Highway 31, Kishanganj, Kishanganj district, Bihar; India
- Coordinates: 26°05′06″N 87°55′51″E
- Elevation: 51 m (167 ft)
- System: Passenger train station
- Owner: Indian Railways
- Operator: Northeast Frontier Railway
- Line: Howrah–New Jalpaiguri line
- Platforms: 2
- Tracks: 2

Construction
- Structure type: Standard (on ground station)

Other information
- Status: Active
- Station code: THED
- Zone(s): Northeast Frontier Railway
- Division(s): Katihar

History
- Former names: East Indian Railway Company

Services
Preceding station	Indian Railways	Following station
Kishanganj towards ?	Eastern Railway zone Howrah–New Jalpaiguri line	Hatwar towards ?
Location

Tauheed railway station (station code: THED), is a halt railway station on Katihar–Siliguri branch of Howrah–New Jalpaiguri line in the Katihar railway division of Northeast Frontier Railway zone. It is situated beside National Highway 31, Kishanganj of Kishanganj district in the Indian state of Bihar.
