= Old Malda Junction railway station =

Railway Station in West Bengal, India

Old Malda Junction

General information
- Location: Station Road, Old Malda, Malda district, West Bengal; India
- Coordinates: 25.0533°N 88.1434°E
- Elevation: 31 metres (102 ft)
- System: Indian Railways station
- Owner: Indian Railways
- Operator: Northeast Frontier Railway
- Lines: Howrah–New Jalpaiguri line; Old Malda–Abdulpur line
- Platforms: 3
- Tracks: 4
- Connections: Auto stand

Construction
- Structure type: At grade
- Parking: No
- Cycle facilities: No

Other information
- Status: Functioning
- Station code: OMLF
- Zone(s): Northeast Frontier
- Division(s): Katihar

Services
| Preceding station | Indian Railways | Following station |
|---|---|---|
| Malda Town towards ? | Northeast Frontier Railway zone and Eastern Railways Howrah–New Jalpaiguri line | Adina towards ? |
| Terminus | Northeast Frontier Railway zone and Eastern Railways Old Malda–Abdulpur line | Malda Court towards ? |
Location
- Location within West Bengal Location within India

Old Malda Junction railway station is a junction railway station in Malda district, West Bengal. Its code is OMLF. It serves Malda. The station consists of three platforms. The platforms are not well sheltered. It lacks many facilities including water and sanitation.

== Major trains ==
Some of the important trains that runs from Malda are :

- New Jalpaiguri -Malda Town Express
- Balurghat–Malda Town Passenger (unreserved)
- Balurghat Malda Town Passenger (unreserved)
- Katihar–Malda Town Passenger (unreserved)
- Malda Court–Siliguri Jn DMU
- Malda Town New Jalpaiguri Passenger (unreserved)
- Singhabad Old Malda Passenger (unreserved)
