= New Jalpaiguri–Amritsar Clone Humsafar Superfast Express =

Train belonging to Indian Railways

New Jalpaiguri–Amritsar Clone Superfast Express
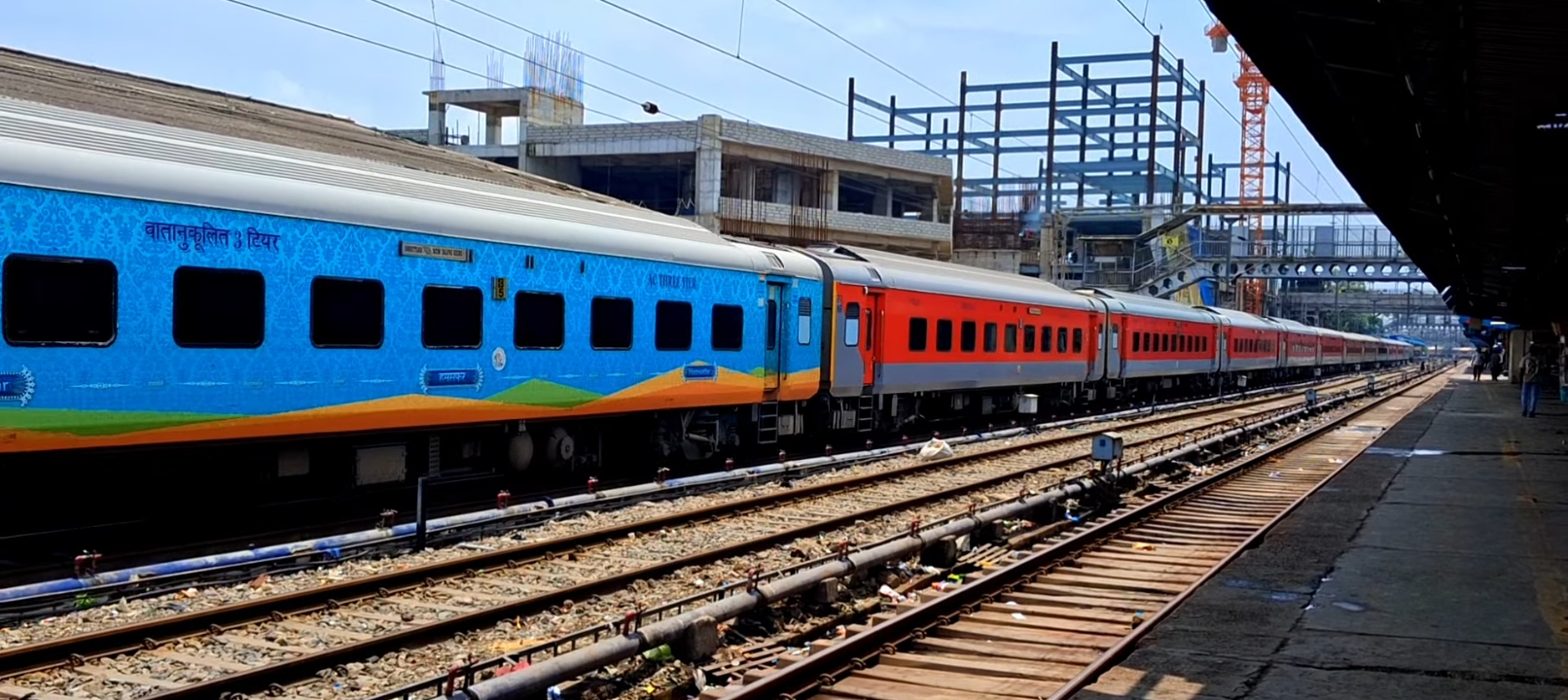
- New Jalpaiguri–Amritsar Clone Superfast Express Arrived At Ludhiana Junction railway station

Overview
- Service type: Humsafar Express
- First service: 25 July 2021; 4 years ago
- Current operator: Northern Railway zone

Route
- Termini: New Jalpaiguri Junction (NJP); Amritsar Junction (ASR)
- Stops: 08
- Distance travelled: 1,825 km (1,134 mi)
- Average journey time: 33 hours 20 minutes
- Service frequency: Weekly
- Train number: 04653/04654

On-board services
- Classes: 3AC, ME1, SL
- Seating arrangements: No
- Sleeping arrangements: Yes
- Catering facilities: Yes
- Observation facilities: LHB coach
- Entertainment facilities: No
- Baggage facilities: Below the seats

Technical
- Rolling stock: 2
- Track gauge: 1,676 mm (5 ft 6 in)
- Operating speed: 55 km/h (34 mph)

New Jalpaiguri–Amritsar Clone Superfast Express is an Humsafar Express train of the Indian Railways connecting the cities of Amritsar in Punjab and Siliguri in West Bengal. It originates from New Jalpaiguri Junction of Siliguri and terminates in Amritsar Junction of Amritsar. It is currently being operated with 04653/04654 train numbers on a weekly basis.

== Coach composition ==
New Jalpaiguri–Amritsar Clone Superfast Express consists of Nine Third AC (3AC) coaches, One AC Three Tier Economy (ME1) Coach, six Sleeper (SL) coaches, One Engine cum Generator Coach and One Second Sitting(2S) Coach.

== Timings ==
The train departs from Platform Number 02 of Amritsar at 08:40 on Wednesday and reaches Platform Number 02 of New Jalpaiguri at 17:45 on Thursday.

Again the train starts from Platform Number 02 of New Jalpaiguri at 07:00 on Friday and reaches Platform Number 02 of Amritsar at 16:20 on Saturday.

== Route ==
1. New Jalpaiguri (Siliguri) (Starts)
2. Katihar
3. Samastipur
4. Muzaffarpur Junction
5. Chhapra Junction
6. Gorakhpur Junction
7. Sitapur Junction
8. Moradabad
9. Saharanpur
10. Amritsar (Ends)

== Traction ==
The train is hauled by WAP-5/WAP-7 Locomotive of Electric Loco Shed, Ghaziabad from New Jalpaiguri to Amritsar.

== See also ==
- Dibrugarh–Amritsar Express
