= Kanki, Uttar Dinajpur =

Village in Uttar Dinajpur, West Bengal

Kanki
- Interactive map of Kanki
- Coordinates: 26.006140°N 87.858254°E

Kanki is a village under Goalpokhar II community development block in the district of Uttar Dinajpur, West Bengal, India. It is also the center of the Kanki Gram Panchayat. It is famous for historical Jain Mandir Kanki and Ramdev Baba Mandir.

== Features ==
The village is located in North Dinajpur, a district of West Bengal. It is situated beside NH-31. The population is about 1600, and the town has a railway station named Kanki railway station with trains to the nearest city, Kishanganj. The area has a population of around 12000. Kanki has a church and two nationalised banks (Punjab National Bank and Indian Overseas Bank), with a temple of Shri Krishna Avatar Baba Ramdev, Digambar Jain Mandir and a Mosque considered tourist attractions.

Kanki's daily temperatures tend to coincide with those of Darjeeling, by virtue of their proximity. In summer, temperatures reach 40 °C and can drop as low as 4 °C in the winter.

== Gram Panchayat ==
The Kanki gram panchayat (village council) is the local government for the villages of Basatput, Chaugharia, Dangi, Deogaon, Hathipaon, Hatwar, Kanki, Mahishakhor, Majlispur, Manora, Matiari, Najarpur, Nayanagar, Pachim Lahil, Peazgaon, Sahaspur, Simulia, Suhia, and Suhiasani.

== Industry ==
The majority of the workforce is involved with the agricultural industry. As suits its agricultural focus, Kanki serves as a hub for vegetable exports and Lahil developing in progress.

== Education ==
There are four high schools (Kanki Shree Jain Vidya Mandir, Kanki, St. Ignatius High School, Majlishpur Manora High School, Manora and Bani Bharati Academy, Deogaon) with co-education facility up to class XII. There is also a girls' school, offering up to class VIII.

Schools offering primary education in the area include Marigold English school, Simulia f.p. School, Evergreen Public School Kanki, Kanki Public School, Kanki Jr. Basic School, Darul Ulum Mohammadia, Hatwar F.p. School, Basatpur Madrasah Shiksha Kendra, Hatwar Msk, Children Ideal English School, Hatipaon F.p. School, Kanki Colony Ssk, Aljamiatus Sunnia Lahil Manora, Sahapur F.p. School, Mahisakhore Ssk, Manora Urdu Medium F.p.school, Al-jame-atul Ashrafia Garib, Dr. Zakir Hussain Public School, Sani Suhia F.p. School, and Nayanagar Ssk., Al Habib Islamic School
