= Mangurjan railway station =

Railway station in Bihar, India

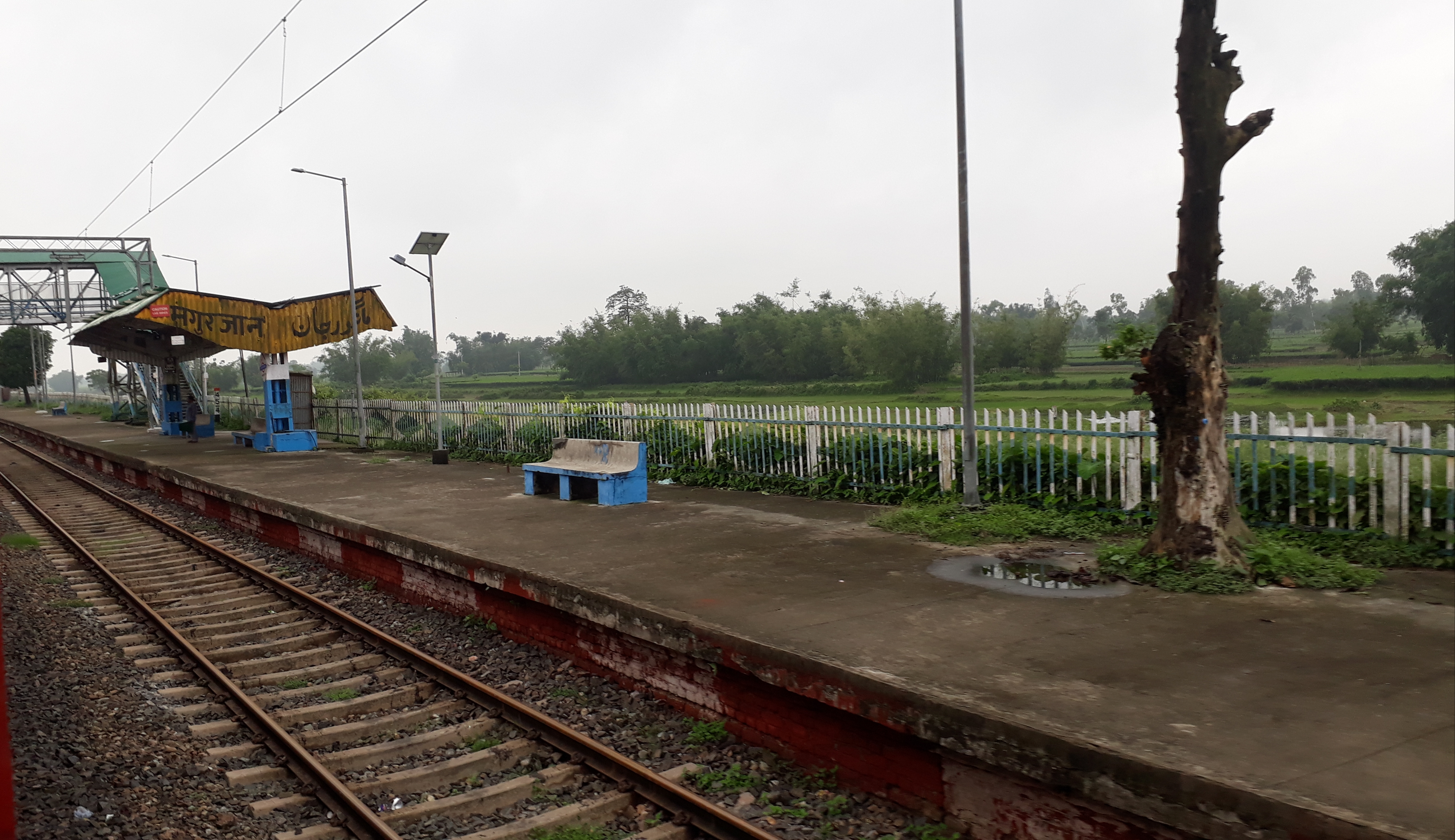
- Mangurjan railway station

General information
- Location: Bhotamari, Mangurjan, Kishanganj district, Bihar; India
- Coordinates: 26°21′42″N 88°13′52″E
- Elevation: 69 m (226 ft)
- System: Passenger train station
- Owner: Indian Railways
- Operator: Northeast Frontier Railway
- Line: Howrah–New Jalpaiguri line
- Platforms: 2
- Tracks: 2

Construction
- Structure type: Standard (on ground station)

Other information
- Status: Active
- Station code: MXJ
- Zone(s): Northeast Frontier Railway
- Division(s): Katihar

History
- Former names: East Indian Railway Company

Services
Preceding station	Indian Railways	Following station
Tin Mile Hat towards ?	Eastern Railway zone Howrah–New Jalpaiguri line	Dhulabari towards ?
Location

Mangurjan railway station (station code: MXJ), is a railway station on Katihar–Siliguri branch of Howrah–New Jalpaiguri line in the Katihar railway division of Northeast Frontier Railway zone. It is situated at Bhotamari, Mangurjan of Kishanganj district in the Indian state of Bihar.
