= Dumdangi railway station =

Railway station in West Bengal

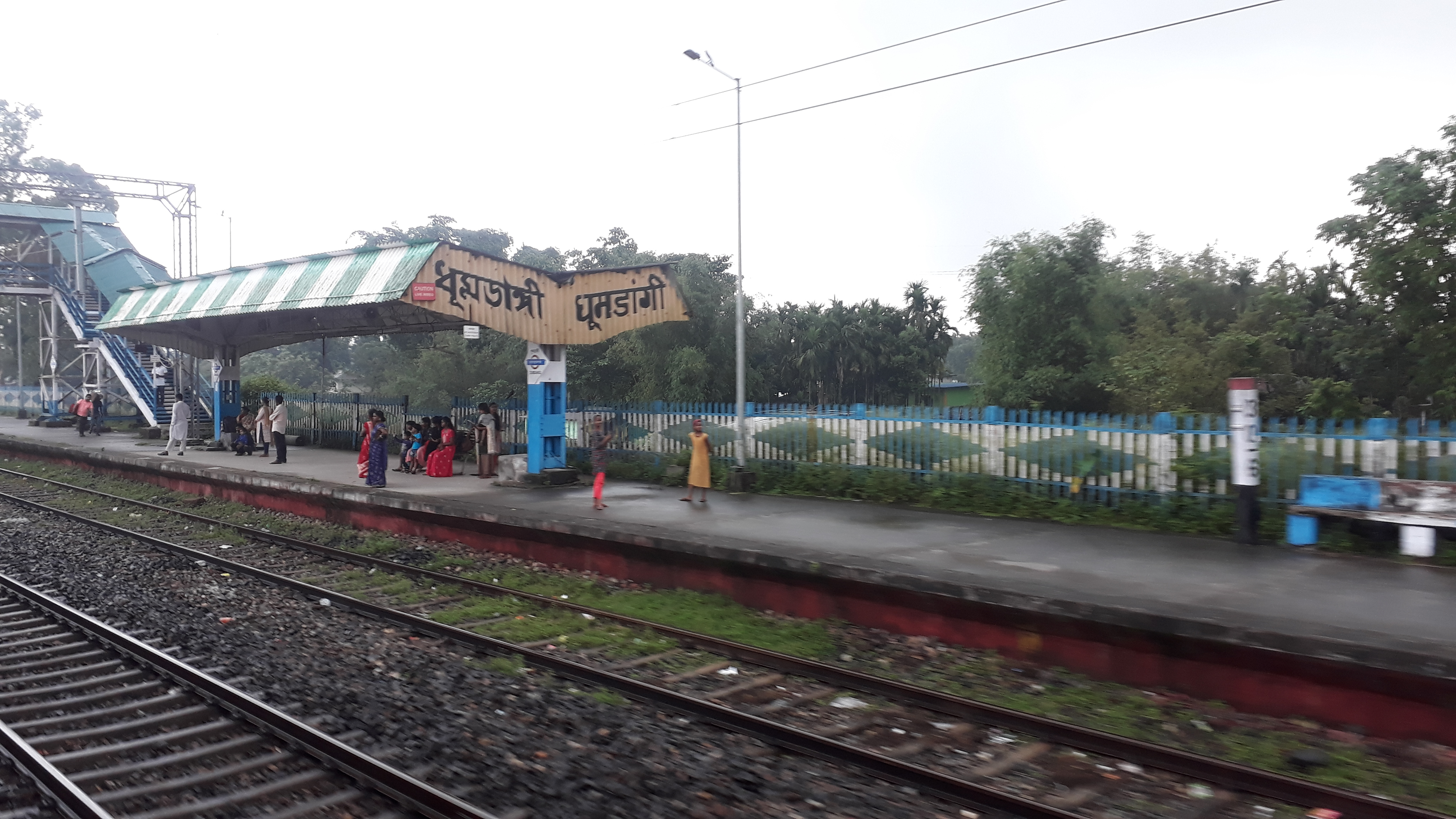
- Dumdangi railway station

General information
- Location: Chopra, Jhajhri, Dhumdangi, Uttar Dinajpur district, West Bengal; India
- Coordinates: 26°28′38″N 88°17′47″E
- Elevation: 87 m (285 ft)
- System: Passenger train station
- Owner: Indian Railways
- Operator: Northeast Frontier Railway
- Line: Howrah–New Jalpaiguri line
- Platforms: 2
- Tracks: 2

Construction
- Structure type: Standard (on ground station)

Other information
- Status: Active
- Station code: DMZ
- Zone(s): Northeast Frontier Railway
- Division(s): Katihar

History
- Former names: East Indian Railway Company

Services
Preceding station	Indian Railways	Following station
Chatterhat towards ?	Eastern Railway zone Howrah–New Jalpaiguri line	Tin Mile Hat towards ?
Location

Dumdangi railway station is a railway station on Katihar–Siliguri branch of Howrah–New Jalpaiguri line in the Katihar railway division of Northeast Frontier Railway zone. It is situated at Chopra, Jhajhri, Dhumdangi of Uttar Dinajpur district in the Indian state of West Bengal.
