= Surja Kamal railway station =

Railway station in West Bengal, India

General information
- Location: National Highway 31, Surjapur, Uttar Dinajpur district, West Bengal; India
- Coordinates: 25°56′09″N 87°50′57″E
- Elevation: 44 m (144 ft)
- System: Passenger train station
- Owner: Indian Railways
- Operator: Northeast Frontier Railway
- Line: Howrah–New Jalpaiguri line
- Platforms: 2
- Tracks: 2

Construction
- Structure type: Standard (on ground station)

Other information
- Status: Active
- Station code: SJKL
- Zone(s): Northeast Frontier Railway
- Division(s): Katihar

History
- Former names: East Indian Railway Company

Services
Preceding station	Indian Railways	Following station
Kanki towards ?	Eastern Railway zone Howrah–New Jalpaiguri line	Dalkhola towards ?
Location

Surja Kamal railway station is a railway station on Katihar–Siliguri branch of Howrah–New Jalpaiguri line in the Katihar railway division of Northeast Frontier Railway zone. It is situated beside National Highway 31 at Surjapur of Uttar Dinajpur district in the Indian state of West Bengal.
