= Sukna, Darjeeling =

Sukna
- Village
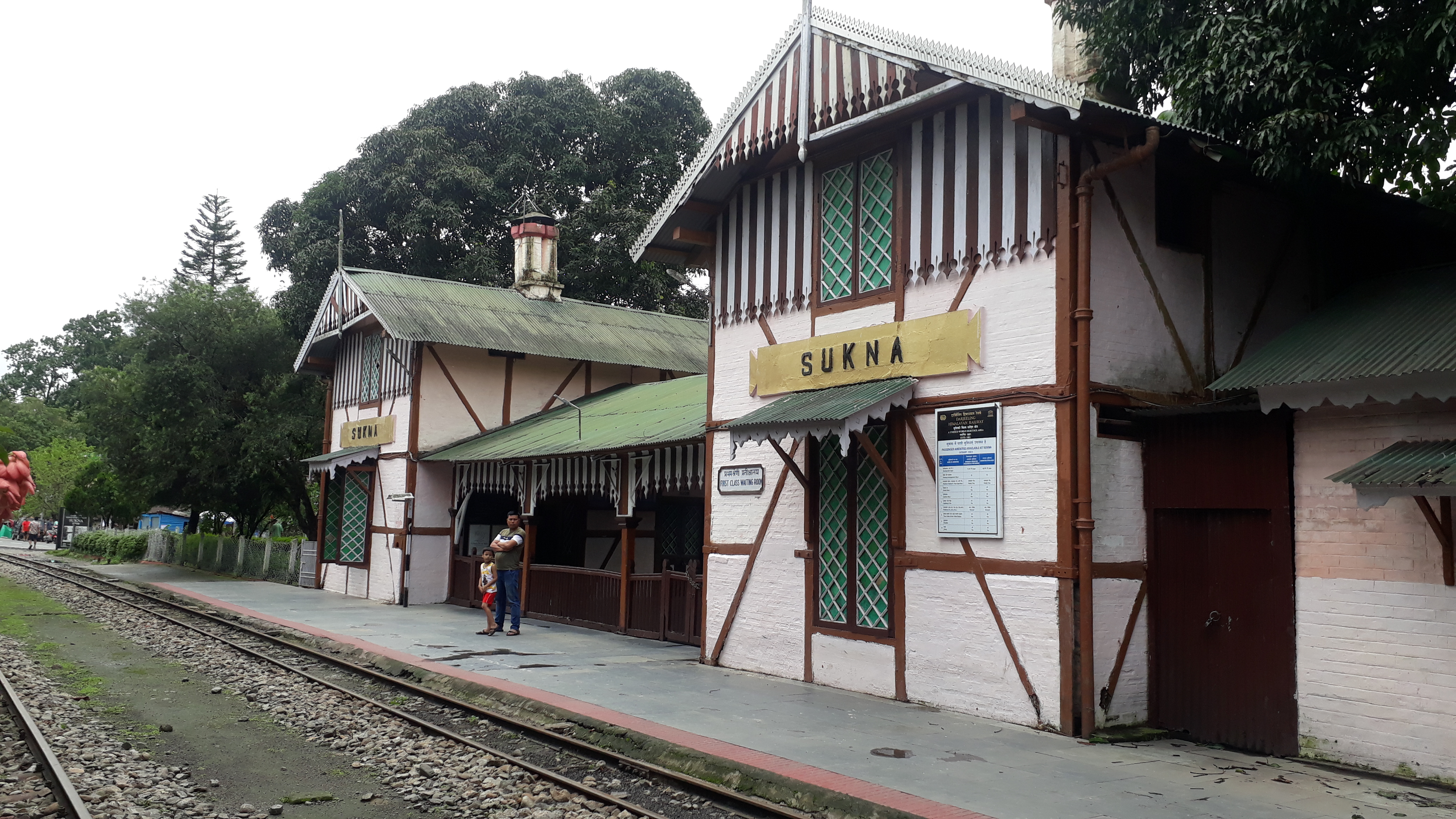
- Sukna railway station

- Location in West Bengal, India Sukna (India)
- Coordinates: 26.7917°N 88.3624°E
- Country: India
- State: West Bengal
- District: Darjeeling
- Elevation: 1,527 m (5,010 ft)

Population (2011)
  - Total: 1,011
- Time zone: UTC+5:30 (IST)
- PIN: 734009
- Telephone/STD code: 0353
- Lok Sabha constituency: Darjeeling
- Vidhan Sabha constituency: Kurseong
- Website: darjeeling.gov.in

Sukna is a village and a gram panchayat in the Kurseong CD block in the Kurseong subdivision of the Darjeeling district in the state of West Bengal, India.

== Geography ==
Places and tea estates in the north-eastern portion of Darjeeling Sadar subdivision (including Rangli Rangliot CD block) and Kurseong subdivision in Darjeeling district
CT: census town, R: rural/ urban centre, N: neighbourhood, H: hill centre, NP: national park/ wildlife sanctuary, TE: tea estate, TA: tourist attraction
Abbreviations used in names – TG for Tea Garden (town/village), TE for Tea Estate
Owing to space constraints in the small map, the actual locations in a larger map may vary slightly

=== Location ===
Sukna is located at 26.7917°N 88.3624°E.

The main entrance to the Mahananda Wildlife Sanctuary is from Sukna. Those who have their own transport can get a guide (on payment) at the Sukna gate and enter the sanctuary. The area inside the sanctuary is hilly and small cars are not advisable. Elephant rides in the sanctuary are not available.

Sukna in the foothills of the Himalayas and is 11 km from Siliguri. There is a popular picnic spot on the bank of the Mahanada.

=== Area overview ===
The map alongside shows the eastern portion of the Darjeeling Himalayan hill region and a small portion of the terai region in its eastern and southern fringes, all of it in the Darjeeling district. In the Darjeeling Sadar subdivision 61.00% of the total population lives in the rural areas and 39.00% of the population lives in the urban areas. In the Kurseong subdivision 58.41% of the total population lives in the rural areas and 41.59% lives in the urban areas. There are 78 tea gardens/ estates (the figure varies slightly according to different sources), in the district, producing and largely exporting Darjeeling tea. It engages a large proportion of the population directly/ indirectly. Some tea gardens were identified in the 2011 census as census towns or villages. Such places are marked in the map as CT (census town) or R (rural/ urban centre). Specific tea estate pages are marked TE.

Note: The map alongside presents some of the notable locations in the subdivision. All places marked in the map are linked in the larger full screen map.

== Army camp ==
The 33 Corps of the Indian Army is based at Sukna. A Corps is made up of 3 divisions and has 45,000 to 50,000 troops.

== Demographics ==
According to the 2011 Census of India, Sukna had a total population of 1,011 of which 480 (47%) were males and 531 (53%) were females. There were 95 persons in the age range of 0 to 6 years. The total number of literate people in Sukna was 830 (82.10% of the population over 6 years).

== Transport ==
The UNESCO World Heritage Site Darjeeling Himalayan Railway narrow gauge, has a Special Jungle Safari daily from Siliguri to Tindharia and back. The light railway passes through Mahananda Wildlife Sanctuary and the renowned Z-reverse between Sukna and Tindharia. The latter is "famous for the 'Agony Point' where the engine seems to overhang the edge as it negotiates a fierce curve of 18 metre radius, the toughest in the line." The nearest broad gauge railway station is Gulma railway station which is around 5 kilometres from Sukna.

Note: Open the section between Sukna and Hill Cart Road in the Route Chart given alongside.

== Education ==
Sukna Higher Secondary School is an English-medium coeducational institution established in 1972. It has facilities for teaching from class V to class XII. It has 5 computers, a library with 500 books and a playground.

Kendriya Vidyalaya at Khaprail, PO Sukna follows the CBSE syllabus up to the higher secondary level.

Army Public School, Simulbari, Sukna, was started as Sisu Siksha Kendra, a pre-primary school in 1976. It grew to become Army School Khaprail in 1991 and became a senior secondary school in 2003. It is affiliated with the CBSE. There are priorities regarding admissions for children of service and ex-service personnel but children of civilians are also admitted.

== Healthcare ==
Sukna Rural Hospital, with 30 beds, is the major government medical facility in the Kurseong CD block.
