= Adina railway station =

Railway station in West Bengal, India

General information
- Location: Gotpara, Adina, Malda district, West Bengal; India
- Coordinates: 24°06′52″N 87°07′23″E
- Elevation: 33 m (108 ft)
- System: Passenger train station
- Owner: Indian Railways
- Operator: Northeast Frontier Railway
- Line: Malda Town–New Jalpaiguri line
- Platforms: 2
- Tracks: 2

Construction
- Structure type: Standard (on ground station)

Other information
- Status: Active
- Station code: ADF
- Zone(s): Northeast Frontier Railway
- Division(s): Katihar

History
- Former names: East Indian Railway Company

Services
Preceding station	Indian Railways	Following station
Eklakhi Junction towards ?	Eastern Railway zone Malda Town–New Jalpaiguri line	Old Malda Junction towards ?
Location

Adina railway station is a railway station on the Malda Town–New Jalpaiguri line of Katihar railway division of Northeast Frontier Railway Zone. It is situated at Gotpara, Adina of Malda district in the Indian state of West Bengal. Total 16 passenger and express trains stop at Adina railway station.
