= Tin Mile Hat railway station =

Railway station in West Bengal, India

General information
- Location: Sonapur Hat, Jiakhori, Uttar Dinajpur district, West Bengal; India
- Coordinates: 26°26′12″N 88°16′48″E
- Elevation: 74 m (243 ft)
- System: Passenger train station
- Owner: Indian Railways
- Operator: Northeast Frontier Railway
- Line: Howrah–New Jalpaiguri line
- Platforms: 2
- Tracks: 2

Construction
- Structure type: Standard (on ground station)

Other information
- Status: Active
- Station code: TMH
- Zone(s): Northeast Frontier Railway
- Division(s): Katihar

History
- Former names: East Indian Railway Company

Services
Preceding station	Indian Railways	Following station
Dumdangi towards ?	Eastern Railway zone Howrah–New Jalpaiguri line	Mangurjan towards ?
Location

Tin Mile Hat railway station is a railway station on Katihar–Siliguri branch of Howrah–New Jalpaiguri line in the Katihar railway division of Northeast Frontier Railway zone. It is situated at Sonapur Hat, Jiakhori of Uttar Dinajpur district in the Indian state of West Bengal.
