= Kanki railway station =

Railway station in West Bengal

General information
- Location: Jain Mandir Road, Basatput, Kanki, Uttar Dinajpur district, West Bengal; India
- Coordinates: 26°00′12″N 87°51′52″E
- Elevation: 47 m (154 ft)
- System: Passenger train station
- Owner: Indian Railways
- Operator: Northeast Frontier Railway
- Line: Howrah–New Jalpaiguri line
- Platforms: 3
- Tracks: 2

Construction
- Structure type: Standard (on ground station)

Other information
- Status: Active
- Station code: KKA
- Zone(s): Northeast Frontier Railway
- Division(s): Katihar

History
- Former names: East Indian Railway Company

Services
Preceding station	Indian Railways	Following station
Hatwar towards ?	Eastern Railway zone Howrah–New Jalpaiguri line	Surja Kamal towards ?
Location

Kanki railway station is a railway station on Katihar–Siliguri branch of Howrah–New Jalpaiguri line in the Katihar railway division of Northeast Frontier Railway zone. It is situated beside Jain Mandir Road at Basatput, Kanki of Uttar Dinajpur district in the Indian state of West Bengal.
