= Sukna railway station =

Railway station in West Bengal, India

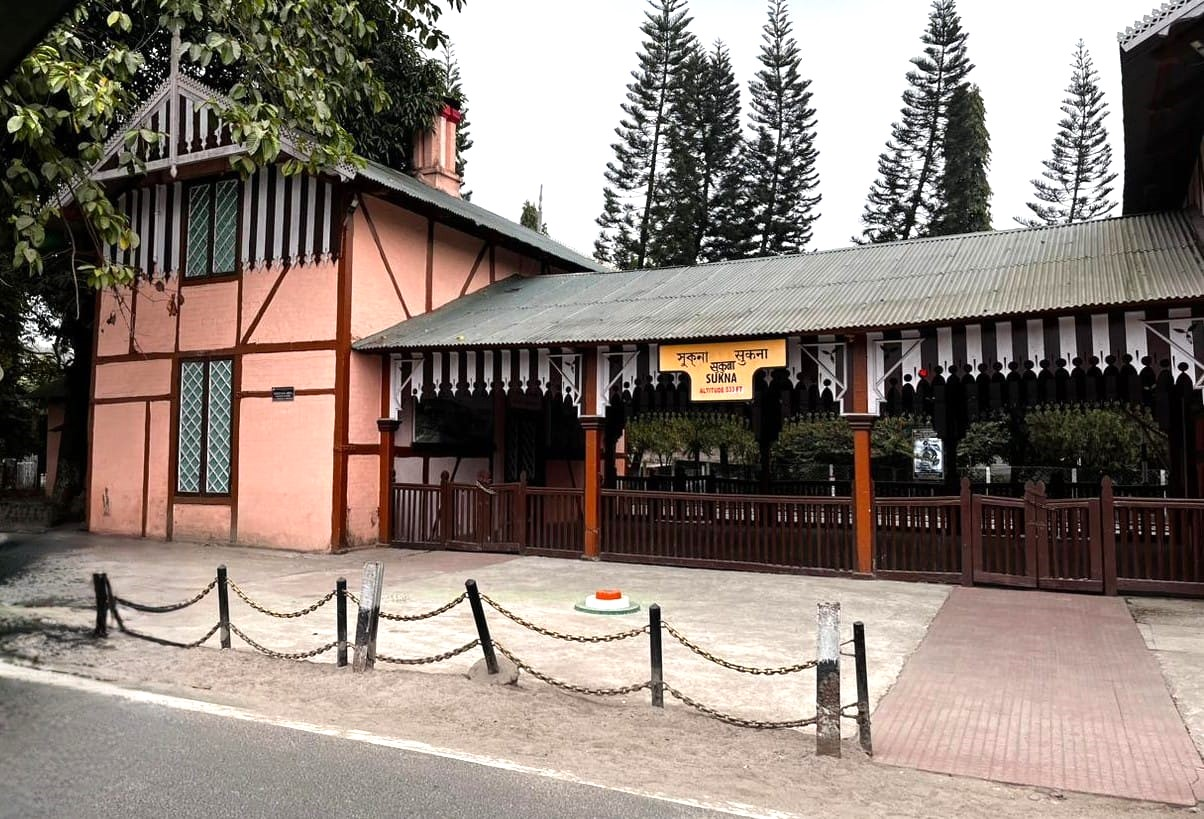
- Sukna Train Station

General information
- Location: Hill Cart Rd, Sukna Pratham Khanda, West Bengal 734007; India
- Coordinates: 26.7917°N 88.3624°E
- Owner: Indian Railways
- Operator: Darjeeling Himalayan Railway
- Line: Katihar railway division
- Tracks: 1 (narrow gauge)

Other information
- Station code: DHR
Location
- Location within India Location within West Bengal

Sukna Train Station "सुकना" is a small train station on the Darjeeling Himalayan Railway line. Sukna station lies in the foothills of the Himalayas, 11 km from Siliguri city.

Sukna station is significant owing to the change in the landscape and altitude of the Darjeeling Himalayan Railway track, transitioning from flat plains to the wooded lower slopes of the mountains. From here, the gradient of the train line changes dramatically. Loop 1, located in the woods above Sukna, was decommissioned after flood damage in 1991, and the site is now obscured by natural forest growth.

A UNESCO World Heritage Site, Darjeeling Himalayan Railway, offers a special jungle safari everyday from Siliguri to Tindharia and back, passing through Sukna station. The scenic and main leg of the journey begins from Sukna Station. The light railway traverses the Mahananda Wildlife Sanctuary and the renowned Z-reverse between Sukna and Tindharia.

Geo location: 26.7917°N 88.3624°E

Station Grade: E

Station code: SN

Zone: NFR/Northeast Frontier

Division: Katihar

Number of Platforms: 1

Track: Narrow Gauge
