= Chattarhat railway station =

Railway station in West Bengal

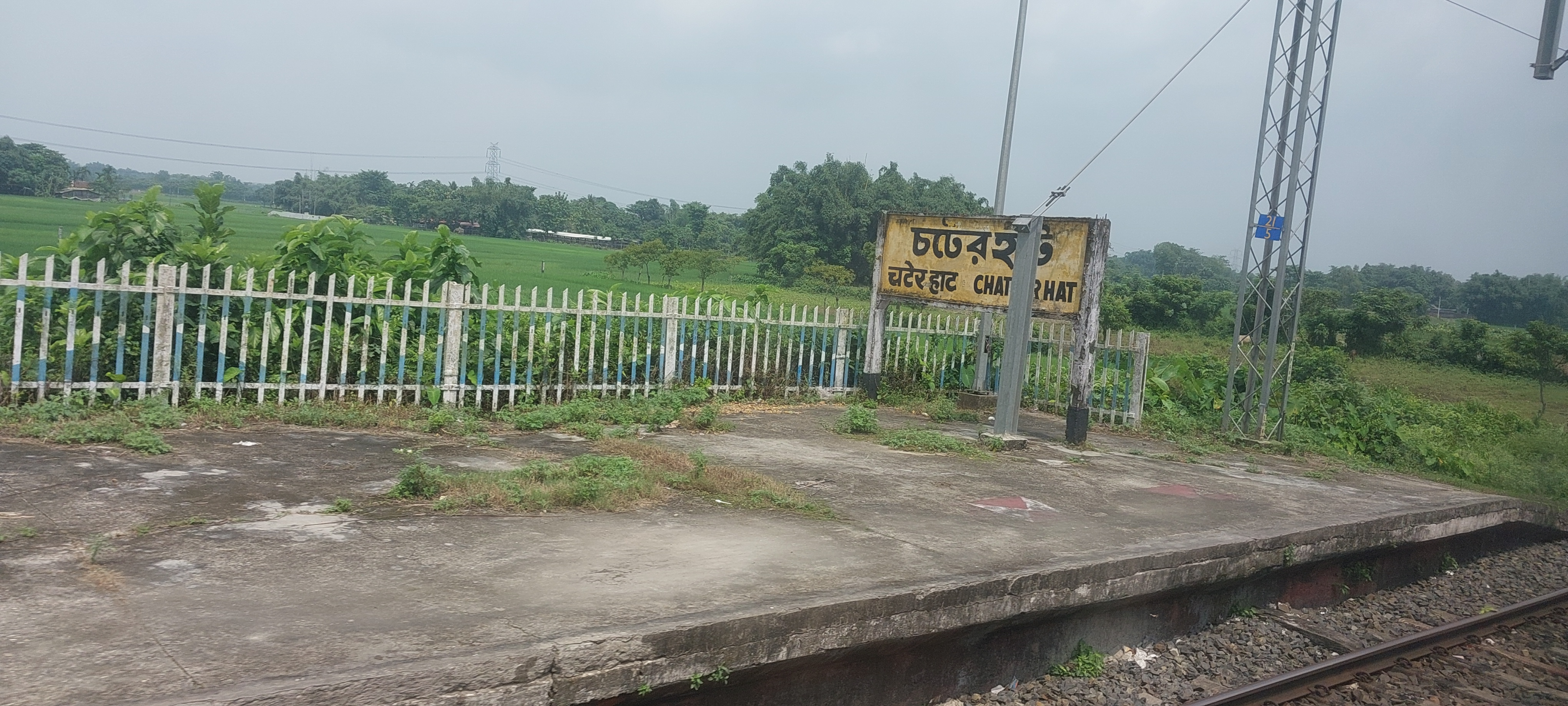

General information
- Location: Paschim Bansgaon Kismat, Chattarhat, Darjeeling district, West Bengal; India
- Coordinates: 26°32′56″N 88°19′24″E
- Elevation: 92 m (302 ft)
- System: Passenger train station
- Owner: Indian Railways
- Operator: Northeast Frontier Railway
- Line: Howrah–New Jalpaiguri line
- Platforms: 2
- Tracks: 2

Construction
- Structure type: Standard (on ground station)

Other information
- Status: Active
- Station code: CAT
- Zone(s): Northeast Frontier Railway
- Division(s): Katihar

History
- Former names: East Indian Railway Company

Services
Preceding station	Indian Railways	Following station
Nijbari towards ?	Eastern Railway zone Howrah–New Jalpaiguri line	Dumdangi towards ?
Location

Chattarhat railway station is a railway station on Katihar–Siliguri branch of Howrah–New Jalpaiguri line in the Katihar railway division of Northeast Frontier Railway zone. It is situated at Paschim Bansgaon Kismat, Chattarhat of Darjeeling district in the Indian state of West Bengal.
