= New Jalpaiguri Junction railway station =

Railway junction station in West Bengal, India

NEW JALPAIGURI Jn.
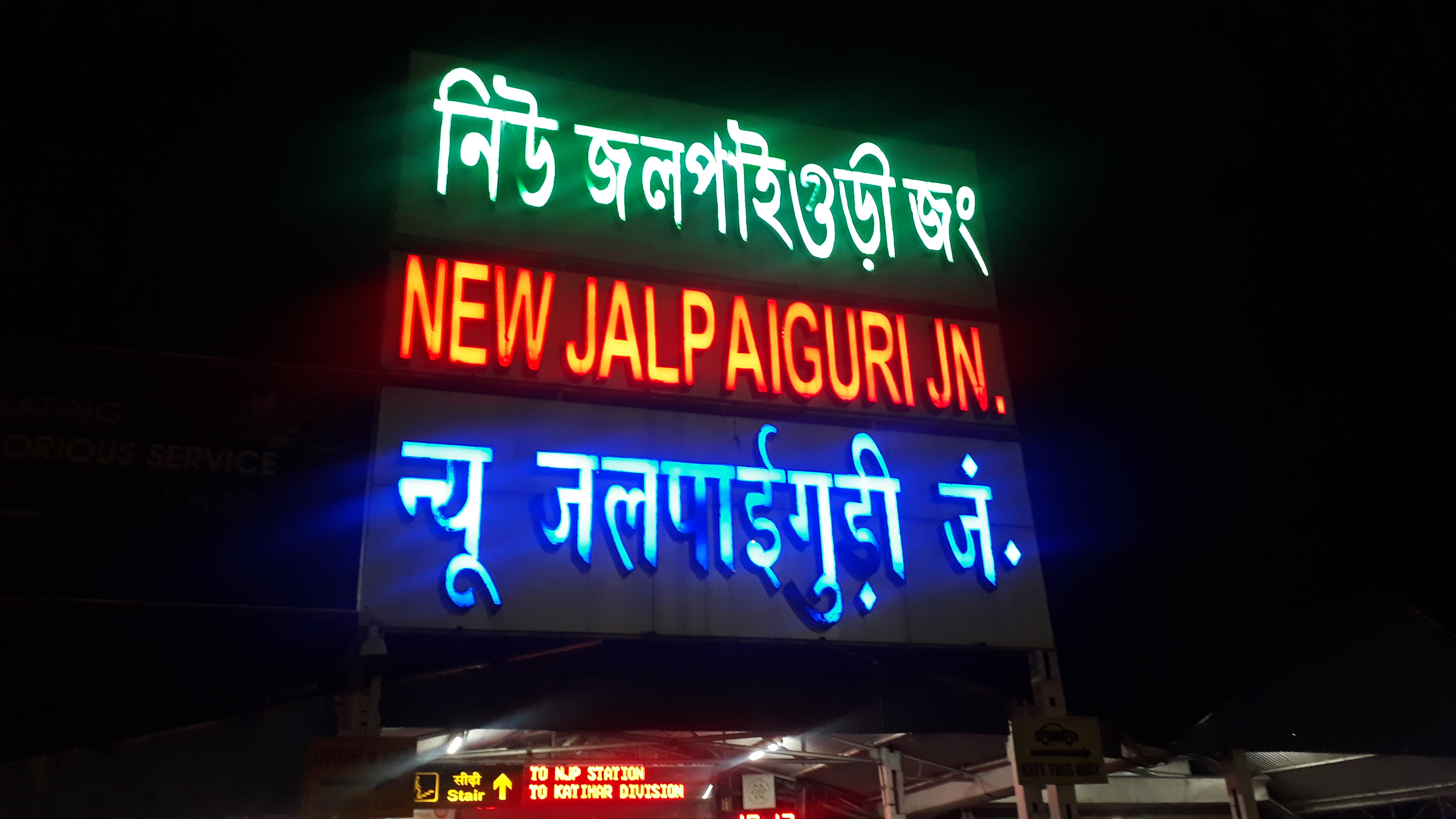
- New Jalpaiguri Junction railway station board

General information
- Location: New Jalpaiguri Road, Bhaktinagar, Siliguri-734004, Jalpaiguri district, West Bengal; India
- Coordinates: 26°40′57″N 88°26′38″E
- Elevation: 114.00 metres (374.02 ft)
- System: Express train and Passenger train station
- Owner: Indian Railways
- Operator: Northeast Frontier Railway (NFR)
- Lines: Darjeeling Himalayan Railway, Howrah–New Jalpaiguri line, Haldibari–New Jalpaiguri line, New Jalpaiguri–Alipurduar–Samuktala Road line; Barauni–Guwahati line; New Jalpaiguri-New Bongaigaon line
- Platforms: 10 (8 Broad Gauge/2 Narrow Gauge)
- Tracks: 45
- Connections: Cabs, Taxi, Auto-rickshaw, E-rickshaw

Construction
- Structure type: At grade
- Parking: Available
- Cycle facilities: Available
- Accessible: Yes

Other information
- Status: Functioning
- Station code: NJP
- Zone(s): Northeast Frontier Railway
- Division(s): Katihar

History
- Opened: 1960; 66 years ago
- Electrified: Yes(July 2020)

Passengers
- 22M/Year: 60K/Day (▲ high)
Location
- Location within West Bengal
- Interactive map

New Jalpaiguri Junction railway station (station code: NJP) established in 1960, is an A1 category broad-gauge and narrow-gauge railway station in Siliguri under Katihar railway division of Northeast Frontier Railway zone. It is the largest and the busiest railway junction of northern Bengal. This junction is largest among the railway stations which serve the city of Siliguri, the largest metropolis of the North Bengal. The other stations are- Siliguri Junction, Gulma, Bagdogra, Matigara, Rangapani and Siliguri Town. New Jalpaiguri junction ranked 10th cleanest railway station in India in 2016 survey and came among the top 100 booking stations of Indian railway. New Jalpaiguri, as a railway station serves as the entry point to North Bengal, Sikkim, other countries like Nepal, Bhutan, Bangladesh and the seven northeastern states (Assam, Arunachal Pradesh, Nagaland, Manipur, Mizoram, Tripura and Meghalaya). New Jalpaiguri Junction acts as a connecting base of railways for the northeastern states to the Indian mainland.

== History ==
The partition of India in 1947 completely disrupted railway communication links in North Bengal and Assam with the southern parts of West Bengal. Earlier, the links were through the eastern part of Bengal, which became a part of Pakistan in 1947. Siliguri gained in importance as the gateway to North Bengal, Sikkim and Bhutan.

Around 1949, Siliguri Junction station, a new station north of the old Siliguri Town railway station, came up with several metre-gauge lines converging on it. In addition there was the narrow-gauge Darjeeling Himalayan Railway running from Siliguri Town station to Darjeeling via Siliguri Junction. The Assam Rail Link Project, completed in 1950, linked the railways in Assam, with a metre-gauge line to Kishanganj. The line running across North Bengal, spanned the Teesta, Torsha, and Sankosh rivers.

In the early 1960s, Indian Railways started changing over from metre gauge to broad gauge and built a new 5 ft 6 in (1,676 mm) broad-gauge station south of Siliguri Town station. Since the new station was located in Jalpaiguri district, it was named New Jalpaiguri. By 1964, New Jalpaiguri became the most important railway station in the area. It had both broad gauge (to Kishanganj and Barsoi, and to Siliguri town and Siliguri junction) and metre gauge (to Siliguri town and Siliguri junction) tracks. The Darjeeling Himalayan Railway narrow-gauge track was extended from Siliguri town station to the New Jaipaiguri station. The metre-gauge track from New Jaipaiguri to Siliguri town and Siliguri junction was later converted to broad gauge.

== Amenities ==
New Jalpaiguri railway station has two double-bedded air-conditioned (AC) retiring rooms, six double-bedded non-AC retiring rooms, one three-bedded dormitory and one twelve-bedded dormitory. Free High speed Google RailWire WiFi is available at this station. It has IRCTC and other private restaurants.

== Services ==
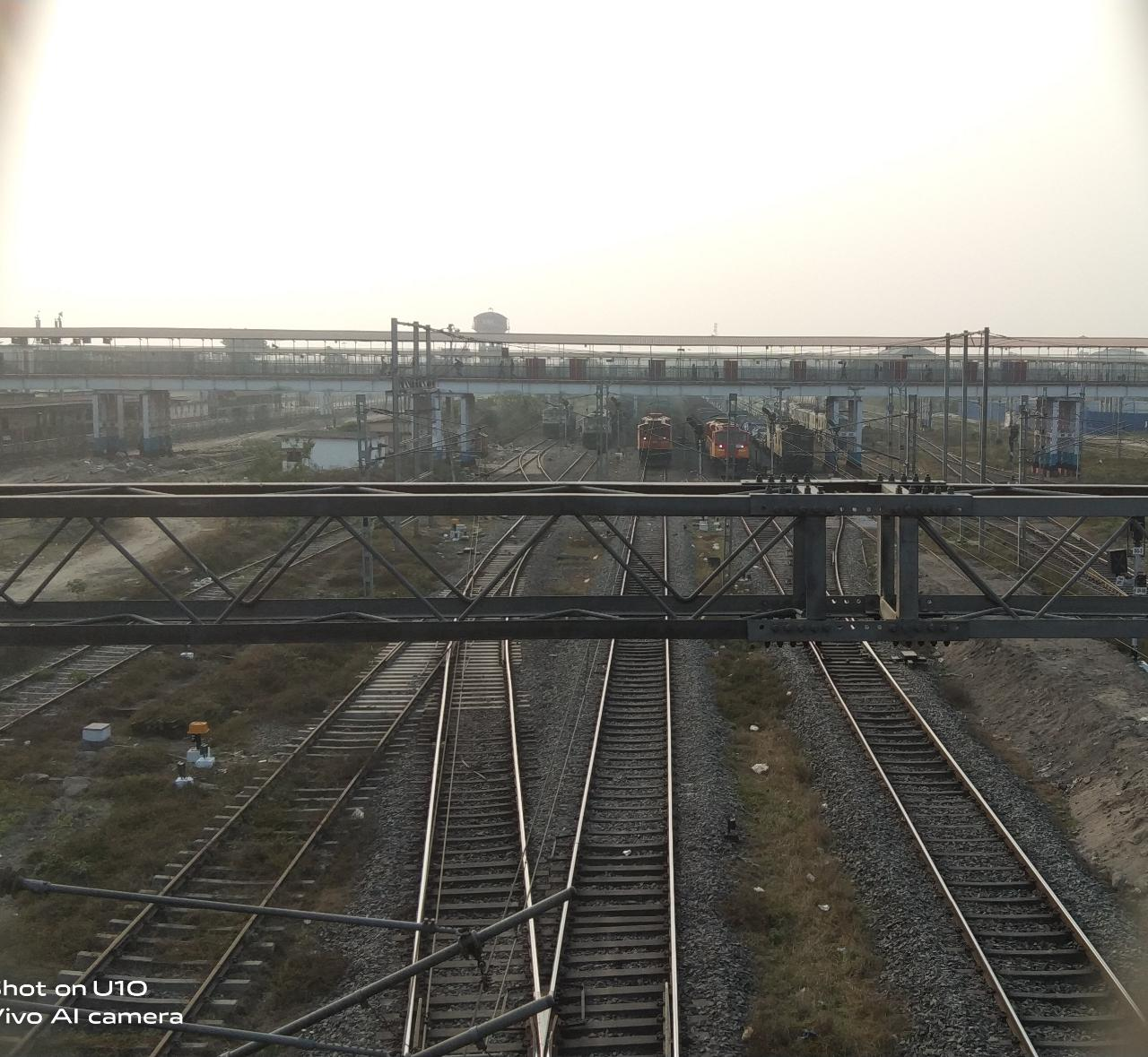
View of tracks from foot over bridge

New Jalpaiguri Jn, which is commonly called as NJP is the largest as well as busiest railway junction of North East Frontier Zone, which serves as the lifeline of the Northeastern states. NJP acts as a connecting base for the Northeastern states to the Indian mainland. NJP is the railway station of the largest city of North Bengal (Siliguri), which is popularly referred as the gateway of northeast India. New Jalpaiguri railway station is amongst the top hundred booking stations of Indian Railway.

New Jalpaiguri has a good connection to Kolkata, Delhi and Guwahati and there are many other trains to different parts of India. New Jalpaiguri is the busiest station in North Bengal and the Northeast Frontier Railway Zone.

=== Darjeeling-Himalayan railway ===
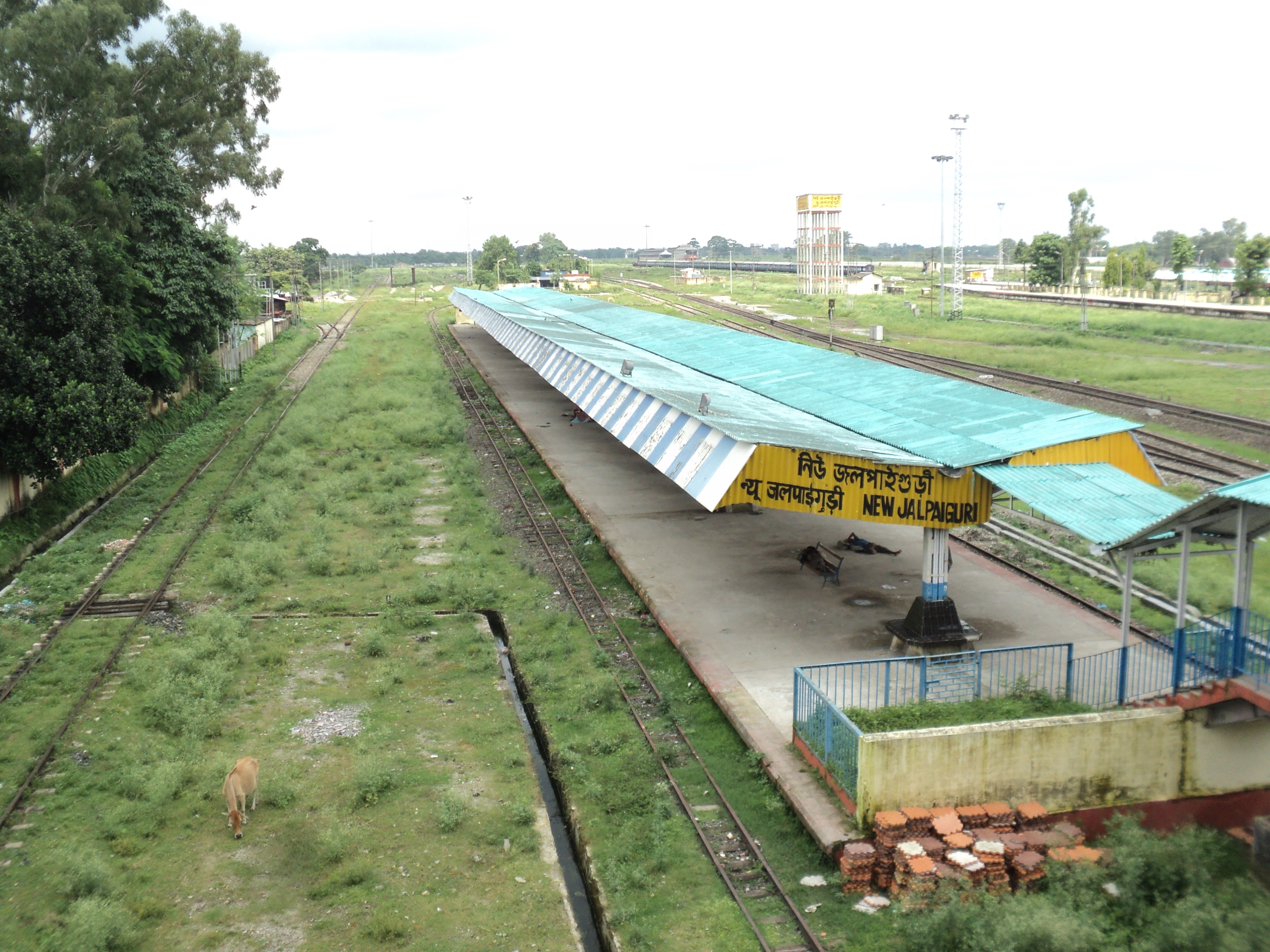
The narrow gauge line and platform at the station

There is one narrow-gauge platform at this station which operates trains towards Darjeeling hills as a part of Darjeeling Himalayan Railway. This is the last terminal of the DHR Railways.

=== Vande Bharat Express ===
- New Jalpaiguri - Howrah Vande Bharat Express connects Siliguri with Kolkata.
- New Jalpaiguri–Guwahati Vande Bharat Express connects Siliguri with Guwahati.
- New Jalpaiguri – Patna Vande Bharat Express connects Siliguri with Patna.
- Kamakhya–Howrah Vande Bharat Sleeper Express India's first Vande Bharat Sleeper train connects Siliguri with Kolkata and Guwahati.

=== Vistadome Trains ===
- New Jalpaiguri–Alipurduar Tourist Express originates from this station and passes through the beautiful Doars region of North Bengal.
- DHR Vistadome Special on Narrow Gauge also originates from this station and passes through hills of Darjeeling.
- New Jalpaiguri–Howrah Shatabdi Express with Vistadome Starts from NJP and reaches Howrah in Kolkata.

=== Rajdhani Express ===
- Three different sets of Dibrugarh Rajdhani Express (Train number 20503, 20505, 12423) connects New Jalpaiguri with Delhi on daily basis.
- Agartala Tejas Rajdhani Express connects NJP to Delhi.
- Sairang–Anand Vihar Terminal Rajdhani Express also connects NJP with Delhi

=== Humsafar Express ===
Different Humsafar Express operating from this station is :

- Sealdah - Jalpaiguri Road Humsafar Express
- Agartala–SMVT Bengaluru Humsafar Express
- New Jalpaiguri–Amritsar Humsafar Superfast Express

=== Amrit Bharat Express ===
The following sets of Amrit Bharat Express trains are available from New Jalpaiguri Junction:

- Nagercoil–New Jalpaiguri Amrit Bharat Express
- Tiruchchirappalli–New Jalpaiguri Amrit Bharat Express
- Panvel–Alipurduar Amrit Bharat Express
- New Jalpaiguri–Amritsar Amrit Bharat Express
- SMVT Bengaluru–Alipurduar Amrit Bharat Express
- Charlapalli–Kamakhya Amrit Bharat Express
- Dibrugarh - Gomti Nagar Amrit Bharat Express
- Kamakhya–Rohtak Amrit Bharat Express

=== AC Superfast Express ===
The following sets of AC Superfast Express trains are available from this railway station:

- Kamakhya–SMVT Bengaluru AC Superfast Express
- Naharlagun - Anand Vihar Arunachal AC Superfast Express
- Lokmanya Tilak Terminus–Agartala AC Superfast Express

=== Other Important trains ===
Important trains like

- Darjeeling Mail
- Padatik Express
- Saraighat Express
- Kamrup Express
- Paharia Express
- Karmabhoomi Express
- Poorvottar Sampark Kranti Express
- Kanchan Kanya Express
- Kanchanjungha Express
- Brahmaputra Mail
- North East Express
- Kaziranga Express
- Avadh Assam Express
- Nagaon Express
- Lohit Express
- Amarnath Express
- Vivek Express
- Kavi Guru Express
- Chennai Central Express
- Tripura Sundari Express
- Aronai Express
- Capital Express
- Dwarka Express
- Uttar Banga Express
- Teesta Torsha Express
- Sairang Express
- Guwahati Garib Rath Express
- Agartala Garib Rath Express

etc are available from NJP.

== Connections ==
=== Buses ===
The North Bengal State Transport Corporation operates bus services from NJP New Jalpaiguri Junction railway station to Siliguri city and sub urban areas, Also private buses runs between all over the city from NJP New Jalpaiguri Junction railway station

=== Cars ===
Many road is directly connected from Siliguri to New Jalpaiguri Junction railway station.

Ride aggregator services Uber, Rapido, Ola provide rides from the train station to various parts of the city. One can also book private cabs to go Darjeeling, Gangtok and all over hill areas. Apart from these numerous private taxi operators provide pre-paid and post-paid taxi services to the city. E-rickshaw, City auto facilities are available in the station.

== See also ==
- North Eastern Railway Connectivity Project
- North Western Railway zone
- Siliguri Junction railway station
- Siliguri Town railway station

Preceding station	Indian Railways	Following station
Rangapani towards ?	Northeast Frontier Railway zone Howrah–New Jalpaiguri line	Terminus
Siliguri Town towards Darjeeling	Darjeeling Himalayan Railway	Terminus
Siliguri Town towards ?	Northeast Frontier Railway zone New Jalpaiguri–Alipurduar–Samuktala Road line	Terminus
Ambari Falakata towards ?	Northeast Frontier Railway zone Haldibari–New Jalpaiguri line	Terminus
Rangapani towards ?	Northeast Frontier Railway zone Katihar–Guwahati line	Ambari Falakata towards ?
