= Darjeeling railway station =

Railway station in West Bengal, India

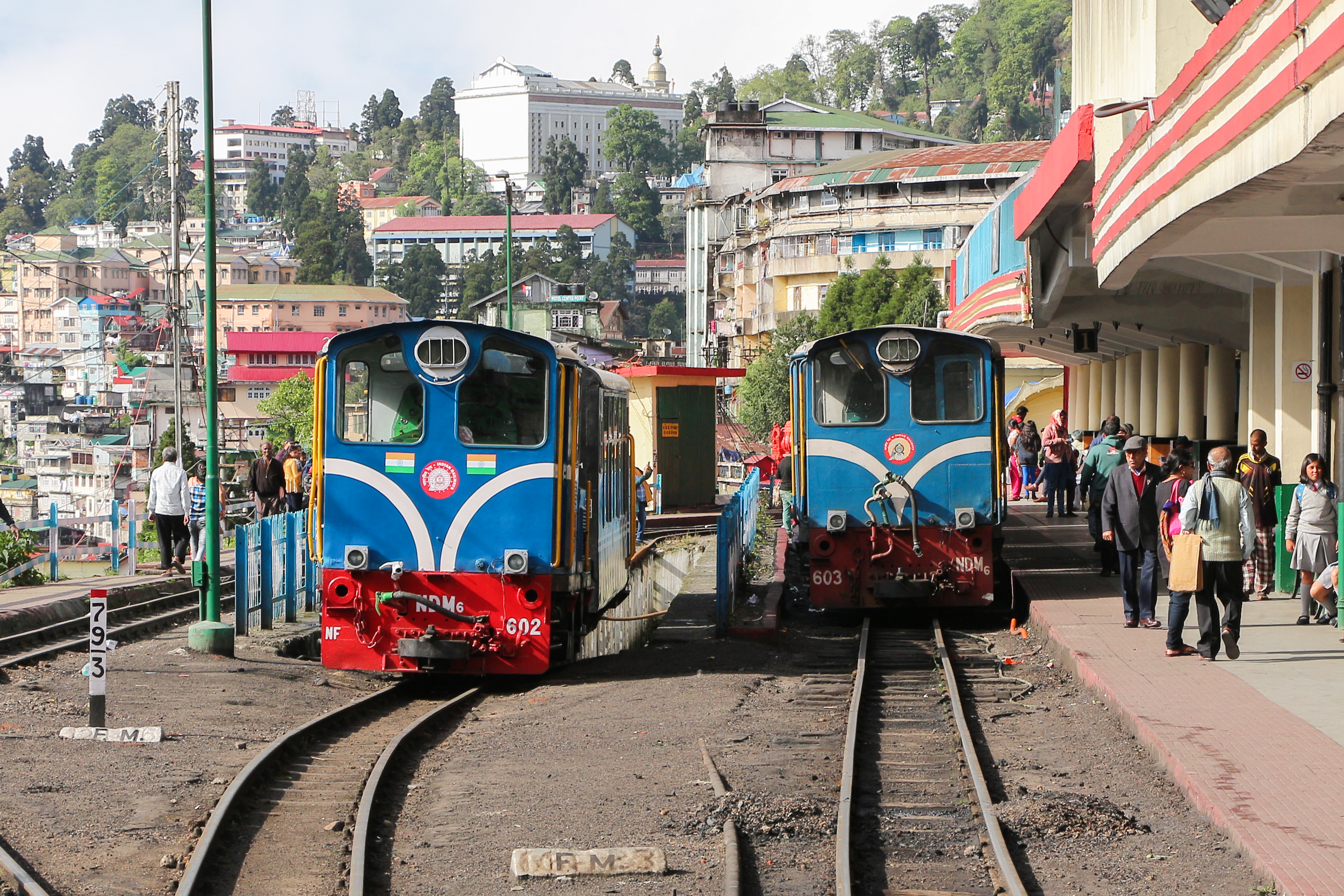

General information
- Location: Hill Cart Road, Limbugaon, Darjeeling, West Bengal; India
- Coordinates: 27.0378°N 88.2630°E
- Elevation: 2,073 metres (6,801 ft)
- System: Indian Railways station
- Owner: Indian Railways
- Operator: Northeast Frontier Railway
- Line: Darjeeling Himalayan Railway
- Platforms: 2
- Tracks: 4
- Connections: Auto stand

Construction
- Structure type: Standard (on-ground station)
- Parking: No
- Cycle facilities: No

Other information
- Status: Functioning
- Station code: DJ
- Zone(s): Northeast Frontier Railway
- Division(s): Katihar

History
- Opened: 1881
- Location within India

UNESCO World Heritage Site
- Part of: Mountain Railways of India
- Criteria: Cultural: (ii)(iv)
- Reference: 944ter-002
- Inscription: 1999 (23rd Session)
- Extensions: 2005, 2008
- Area: 4.59 ha (11.3 acres)
- Buffer zone: 500 ha (1,200 acres)
- Coordinates: 27°02′16″N 88°15′47″E
Location
- Location within West Bengal Location within India

Darjeeling railway station is the main railway station in Darjeeling district in the Indian state of West Bengal. The station lies on UNESCO World Heritage Site Darjeeling Himalayan Railway. Darjeeling station is located at an altitude of 2,073 metres (6,801 ft) above mean sea level. It was allotted the railway code of DJ under the jurisdiction of Katihar railway division.

== Trains ==
Some of the trains that run from Darjeeling are:

- Darjeeling–Ghoom–Darjeeling JOY RIDE (Diesel)
- Darjeeling–Ghoom–Darjeeling JOY RIDE (Steam)
- Darjeeling–Ghoom–Darjeeling Joy Ride (Diesel)
- Darjeeling–Ghoom–Darjeeling Joyride (Diesel)
- Darjeeling–Kurseong NG Passenger
- Darjeeling–Kurseong NG Passenger
- Darjeeling–New Jalpaiguri Passenger
- Red Panda Express
