= Mahananda Wildlife Sanctuary =

Protected area in West Bengal, India

- IUCN category IV (habitat/species management area)
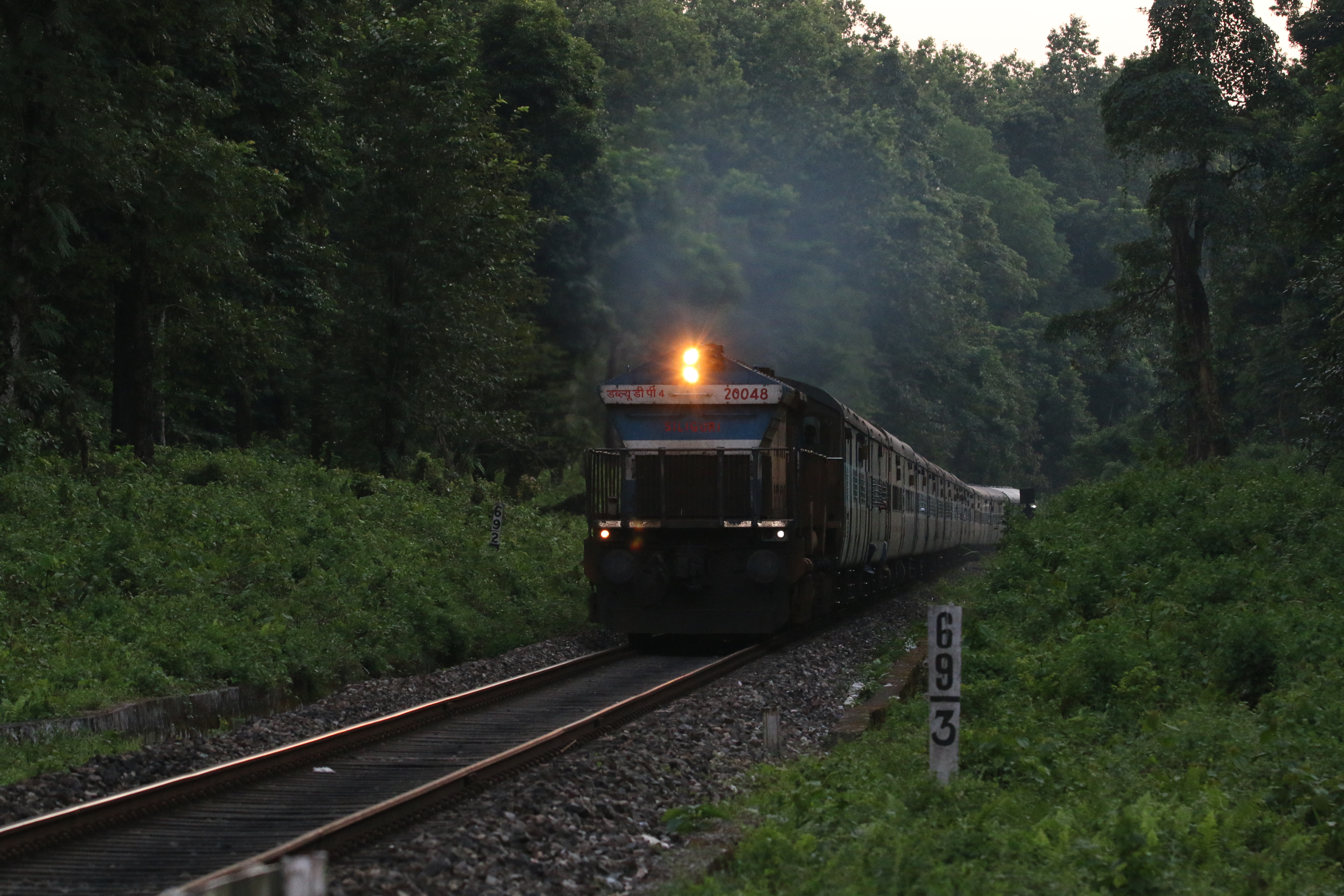
- Diesel locomotive of Indian Railways going through Mahananda Wildlife Sanctuary near Sevoke

- Location within West Bengal Location within India
- Interactive map of Mahananda Wildlife Sanctuary
- Location: Darjeeling, West Bengal, India
- Nearest city: Siliguri
- Coordinates: 26°28′52″N 88°15′50″E
- Area: 158 km^{2} (61 sq mi)
- Established: 1976
- Governing body: Government of India, Government of West Bengal

Mahananda Wildlife Sanctuary (Pron: móhɑ́nɑ́ndaa) is located on the foothills of the Himalayas, between the Teesta and Mahananda rivers. Situated in the Darjeeling district of West Bengal, India; it comes under Darjeeling Wildlife division and can be reached from Siliguri in 30 minutes. Sukna, the gateway to the sanctuary, is only 13 km from Siliguri and 28 km from Bagdogra airport. The sanctuary sprawls over 159 km^{2} of reserve forest and was started as a game sanctuary in 1955. In 1959, it got the status of a sanctuary mainly to protect the Indian bison and Bengal tiger, which were facing the threat of extinction.

== Geography ==
Places and tea estates in the southern portion of Darjeeling Sadar subdivision (including Jorebunglow Sukhiapokhri CD block), Kurseong subdivision and Mirik Subdivision in Darjeeling district
CT: census town, R: rural/ urban centre, NP: national park/ wildlife sanctuary, TE: tea estate
Abbreviations used in names – TG for Tea Garden (town/village), TE for Tea Estate
Owing to space constraints in the small map, the actual locations in a larger map may vary slightly

The forest type in Mahananda WLS varies from riverain forests like Khayer-Sisoo to dense mixed-wet forest in the higher elevation in Latpanchar area of Kurseong hills. The variation in elevation and forest types helps the existence of a large number of species of mammals, birds and reptiles. Varying elevation from 166 metres at the southern range of Sukna forest to the elevation up to 1,500 metres at Latkothi beat office covers varied vegetation and is home to superb biome restricted species. Latpanchar actually forms the highest part of the Sanctuary, with an average elevation of 1,400 metres.

Note: The map alongside presents some of the notable locations in the subdivision. All places marked in the map are linked in the larger full screen map.

== Biodiversity ==
Avian fauna listed from this park are of A1, A2 and A3 categories with IBA site code IN-WB-07.

== Natural history ==
=== Biomes ===
Inside this wildlife sanctuary, the primary biomes corresponding to the ecoregions are:

- Sino-Himalayan Temperate Forest of the Eastern Himalayan broadleaf forests Biome 7
- Sino-Himalayan Subtropical Forest of the Himalayan subtropical broadleaf forests Biome 8
- Indo-Chinese Tropical Moist Forest of the Himalayan subtropical pine forests Biome 9

All of these are typical forest type of foothills of the Bhutan - Nepal - India hilly region between altitudinal range 166 metres to 1,500 metres.

=== Fauna ===
Birds in Mahananda Wildlife Sanctuary include the rufous-necked hornbill, Oriental pied hornbill, and the Great hornbill. Among the others, swallow, swift, thrush, babbler, warbler, roller, minivet and sunbird can be found in abundance. Mammals reported in this area include Himalayan serow, Himalayan porcupine, Himalayan black bear, binturong and clouded leopard. Other mammalian species include Indian elephant, gaur, chital, barking deer, sambar, rhesus monkey, leopard.

== See also ==
- Neora Valley National Park
- Gorumara National Park
- Chapramari Wildlife Sanctuary
- Pangolakha Wildlife Sanctuary
- Kyongnosla Alpine Sanctuary
