= Rangapani railway station =

Railway station in West Bengal

General information
- Location: Fulbari Ghoshpukur Canal Road, Rangapani, Siliguri, Darjeeling district, West Bengal; India
- Coordinates: 26°39′51″N 88°22′28″E
- Elevation: 114 m (374 ft)
- System: Passenger train station
- Owner: Indian Railways
- Operator: Northeast Frontier Railway
- Line: Howrah–New Jalpaiguri line
- Platforms: 2
- Tracks: 12
- Connections: Auto rickshaw, E-rickshaw, Bus, Taxi, Cabs, bike taxi

Construction
- Structure type: Standard (on ground station)
- Parking: Available

Other information
- Status: Active
- Station code: RNI
- Zone(s): Northeast Frontier Railway
- Division(s): Katihar

History
- Former names: East Indian Railway Company

Services
Preceding station	Indian Railways	Following station
New Jalpaiguri Junction towards ?	Eastern Railway zone Howrah–New Jalpaiguri line	Nijbari towards ?
Location

Rangapani railway station is a railway station on Katihar–Siliguri branch of Howrah–New Jalpaiguri line in the Katihar railway division of Northeast Frontier Railway zone. It is situated beside Fulbari Ghoshpukur Canal Road, Rangapani in Siliguri of Darjeeling district in the Indian state of West Bengal.

== Trains ==
Few trains have stoppages in this station.

== Accidents and incidents ==
- On 17 June 2024, A Kanchanjungha Express train collided with a goods train near Rangapani railway station, killing 15 people and injuring at least 60.
