= Katihar railway division =

Railway division of India

Katihar Railway Division
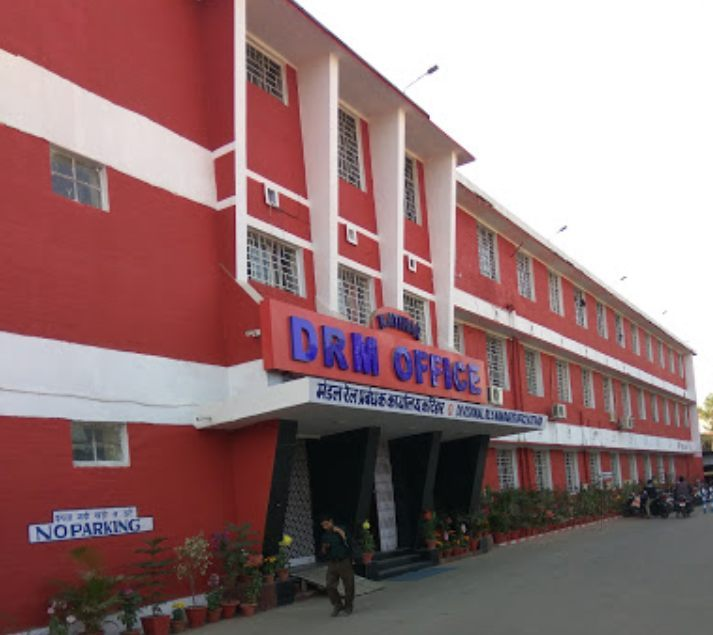
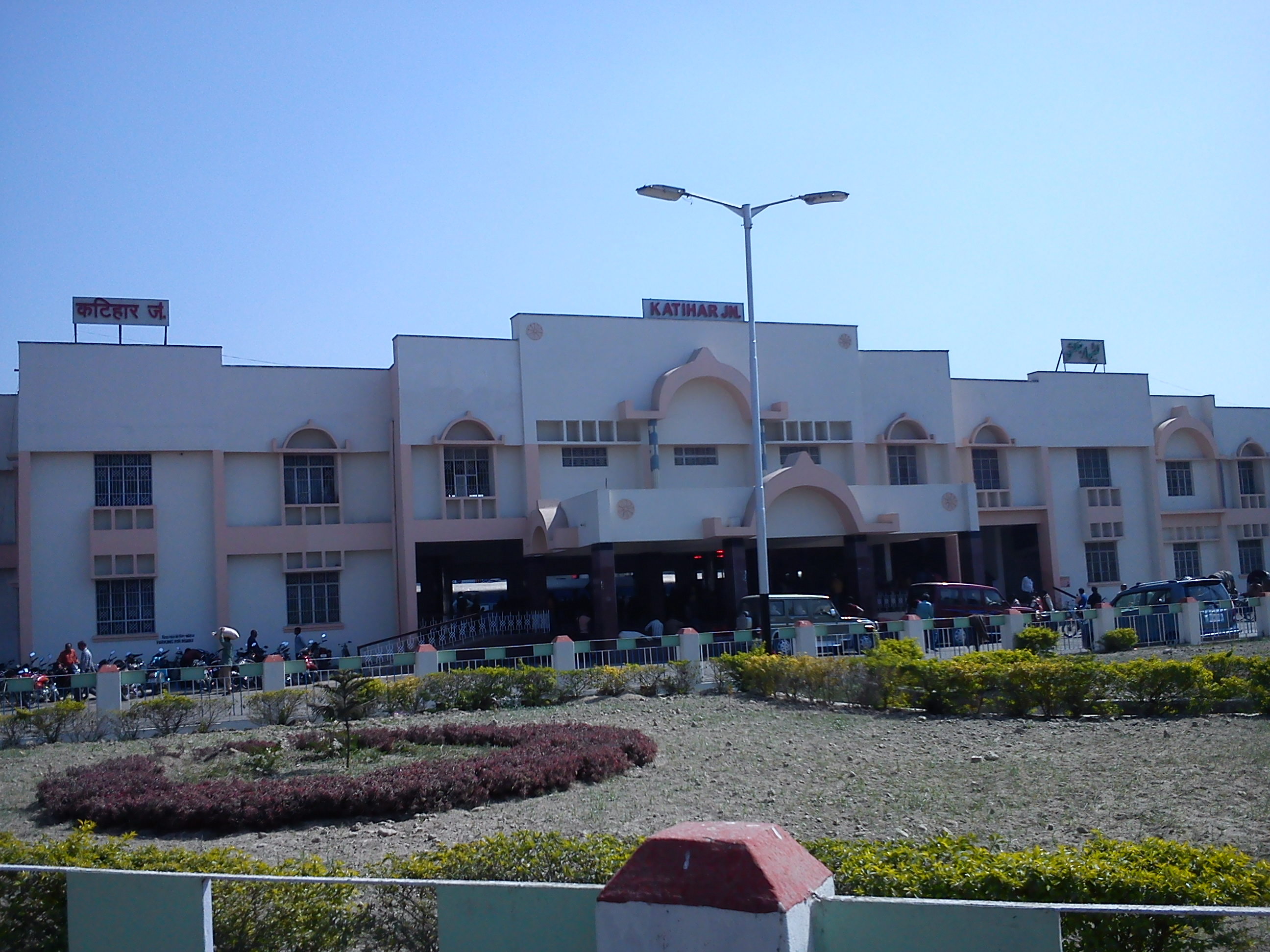
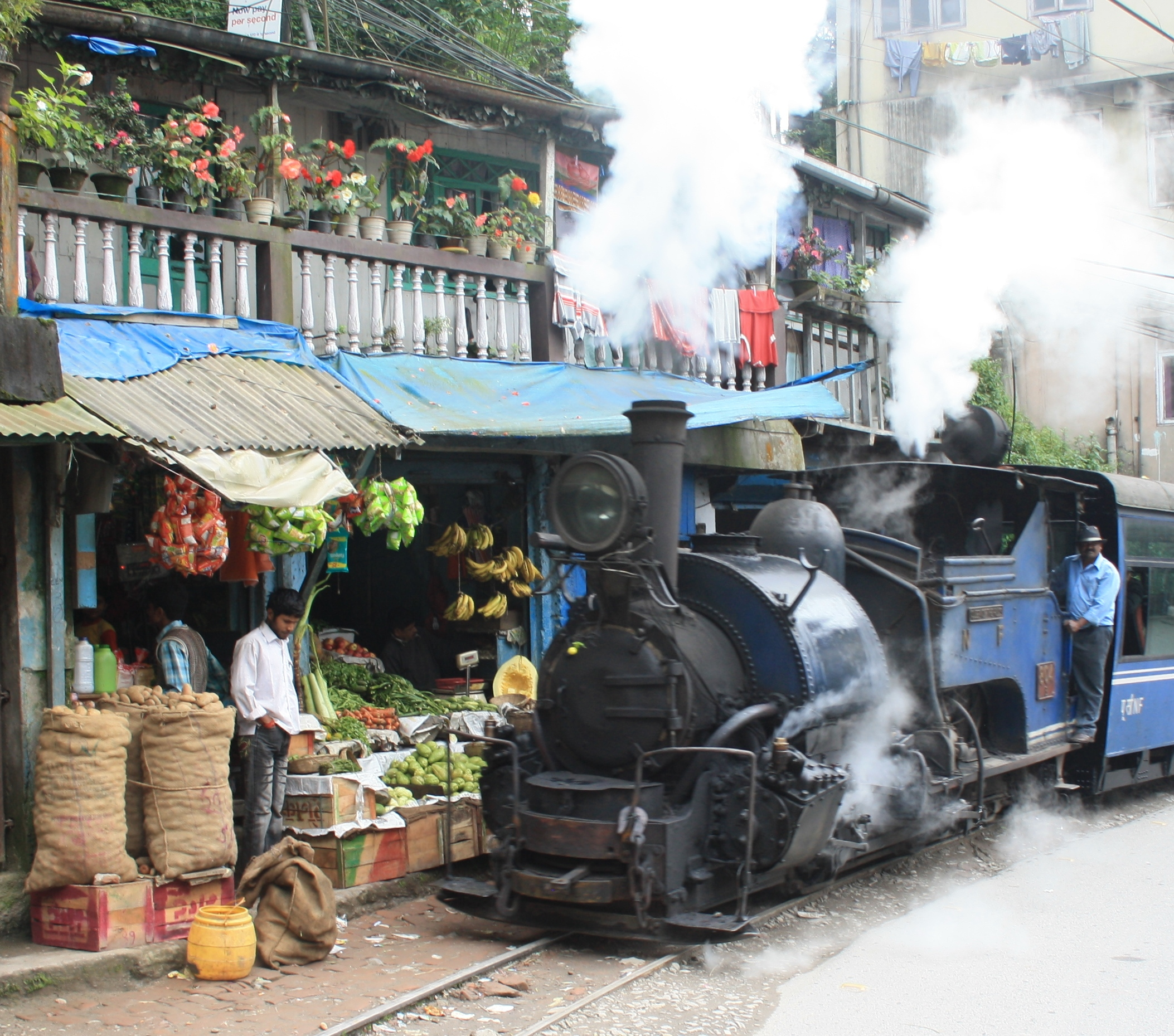
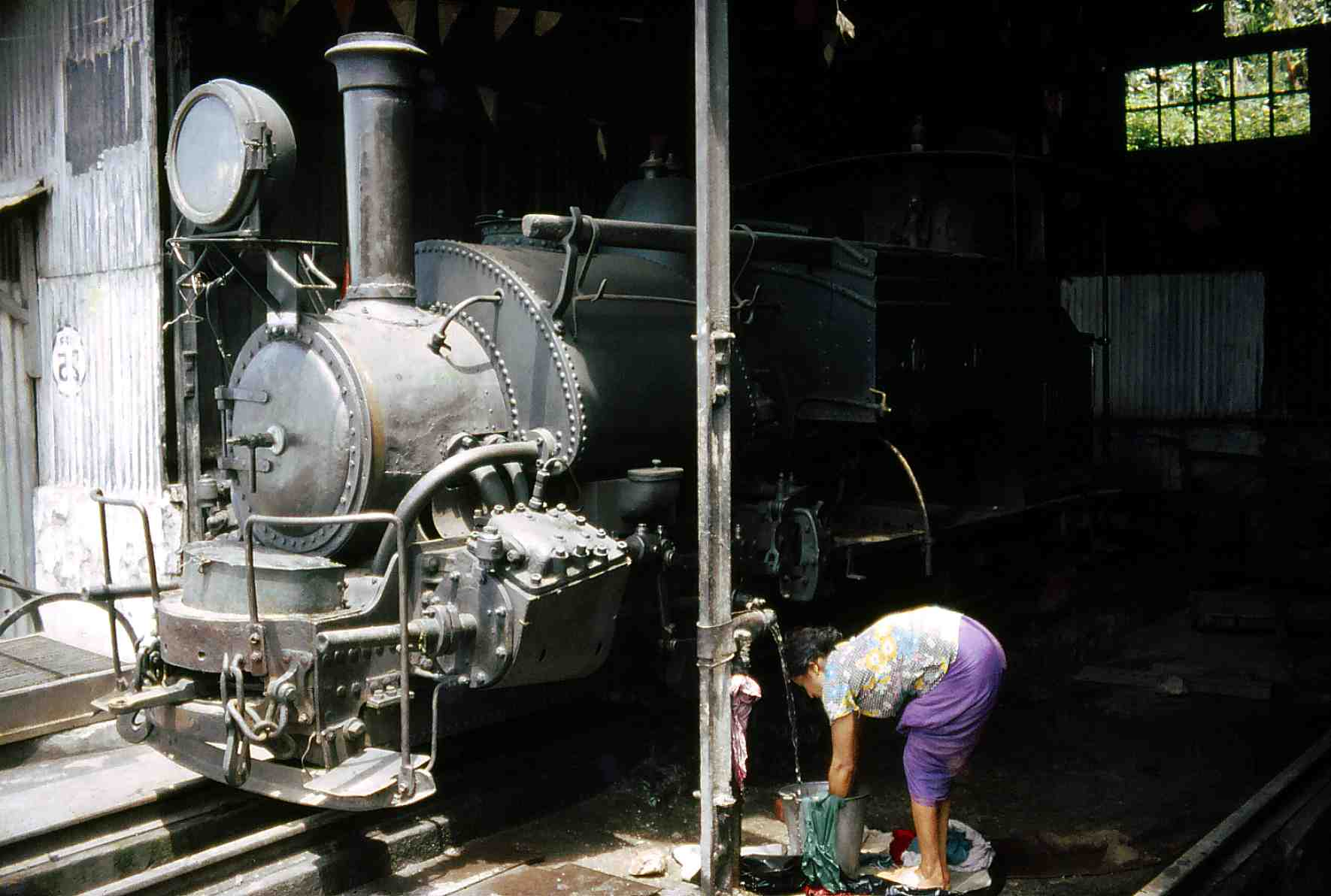
- From top, left to right: Katihar DRM Office, Katihar Junction, New Jalpaiguri RS (under KIR division), Darjeeling Himalayan Railway (under KIR division), NG steam loco shed, Purnia Junction (under KIR division)

Overview
- Headquarters: Katihar, Bihar, India
- Locale: West Bengal, Bihar
- Dates of operation: 15 January 1958; 68 years ago–

Technical
- Track gauge: Broad Gauge; Narrow Gauge
- Previous gauge: Metre Gauge
- Electrification: On construction

Other
- Website: North East Frontier Railway website

Katihar railway division is one of the five railway divisions under the jurisdiction of Northeast Frontier Railway zone of the Indian Railways. This railway division was formed on 15 January 1958 and its headquarter is located at Katihar in the state of Bihar.

Alipurduar railway division, Lumding railway division, Tinsukia railway division and Rangiya railway division are the other four railway divisions under the NFR Zone headquartered at Maligaon, Guwahati.

== List of railway stations ==
The list includes the stations under the Katihar railway division and their station category.

Category of station	No. of stations	Names of stations		
A-1 Category	2	New Jalpaiguri; Katihar Junction		
A Category	4	Purnia Junction; Jalpaiguri Road; Kishanganj; Siliguri Junction		
B Category	7	Barsoi; Old Malda Junction; Jogbani		
C Category (Suburban station)	-	Raiganj; D Category	-	-
E Category	-	-		
F Category; Halt Station				
Total	-	-		

Stations closed for Passengers -

== State Wise Route KMs ==
As of 31-03-2018
State	BG			MG	NG	Total KMs
State	Electrified	Non-Electrified	Sub-Total	MG	NG	Total KMs
Bihar	31.03	296.23	327.26	0.34	-	327.60
West Bengal	66.72	367.74	434.46	-	87.48	521.94
Total	97.75	663.97	761.72	0.34	87.48	849.54

== See also ==
- Indian Railways
- Rail transport in India
- Katihar Junction railway station
- Zones and divisions of Indian Railways
