= Borders of Bhutan =

Political boundaries between Bhutan and neighboring territories

Bhutan shares its borders with only two countries i.e. India and China. Bhutan, being a landlocked country does not maintain any maritime boundaries.

== Land border ==
Bhutan shares its land borders with India and China.

Land Border Country	Length (km) and (mi)	Force	Notes
India	578 km (359 mi)	Royal Bhutan Army	Also see- Bhutan–India border
China	477 km (296 mi)	Royal Bhutan Army	Also see- Bhutan–China border

== Disputes ==
Bhutan has a few land disputes with China. For a brief period in circa 1911, the Republic of China officially maintained a territorial claim on parts of Bhutan. The territorial claim was maintained by the People's Republic of China after the Chinese Communist Party took control of mainland China in the Chinese Civil War in 1949. Mao Zedong declared in the original 1939 version of The Chinese Revolution and the Communist Party that "the correct boundaries of China would include Burma, Bhutan and Nepal". In his Five Fingers of Tibet policy, he also referred to Bhutan as a part of Tibet and therefore China. In 1959, China released a map in A brief history of China where considerable portions of Bhutan as well as other countries was included in its territorial claims. In 1998, China and Bhutan signed a bilateral agreement for maintaining peace on the border. In the agreement, China affirmed its respect for Bhutan's sovereignty and territorial integrity and both sides sought to build ties based on the Five Principles of Peaceful Co-existence. However, China's building of roads on what Bhutan asserts to be Bhutanese territory, allegedly in violation of the 1998 agreement, has provoked tensions. In 2002, however, China presented what it claimed to be 'evidence', asserting its ownership of disputed tracts of land; after negotiations, an interim agreement was reached. On 2 June 2020, China raised a new dispute over territory that has never come up in boundary talks earlier. In the virtual meeting of the Global Environment Facility (GEF), China objected to a grant for the Sakteng Wildlife Sanctuary in eastern Bhutan's Trashigang District claiming that the area was disputed.

Bhutan has no border disputes with India.

== Transport and crossings ==
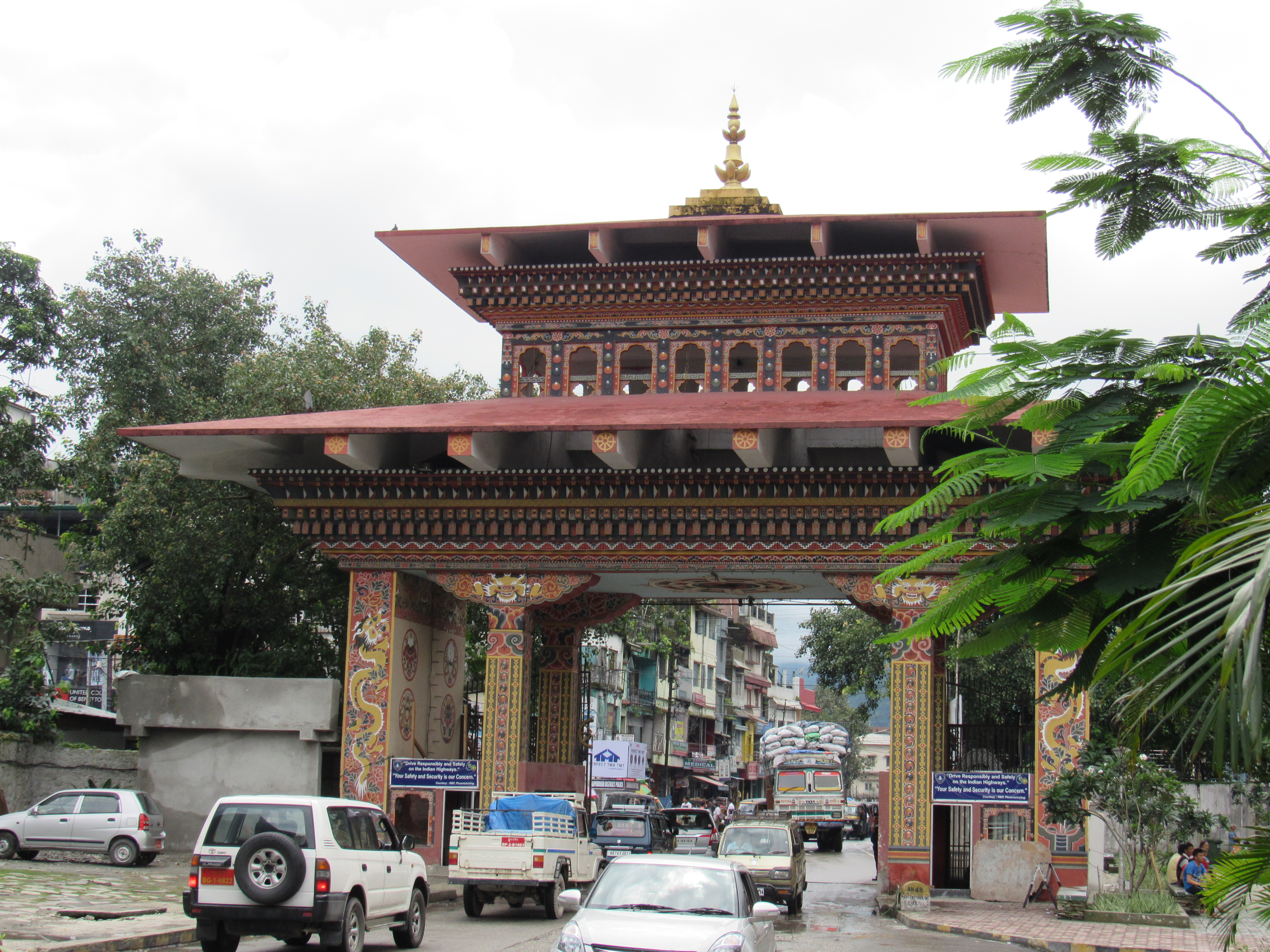
The gate marking the border, view from Phuntsholing, Bhutan

The border between Bhutan and India is the only land access into entering Bhutan, as the border with China is completely closed. The single entry point for foreign nationals is between the towns of Jaigaon, Alipurduar subdivision, Alipurduar District in the Indian state of West Bengal and Phuntsholing, in South West Bhutan.
