= P. C. Mittal Memorial Bus Terminus =

Bus terminal in North Bengal, India

P.C. Mittal Memorial Bus Terminus
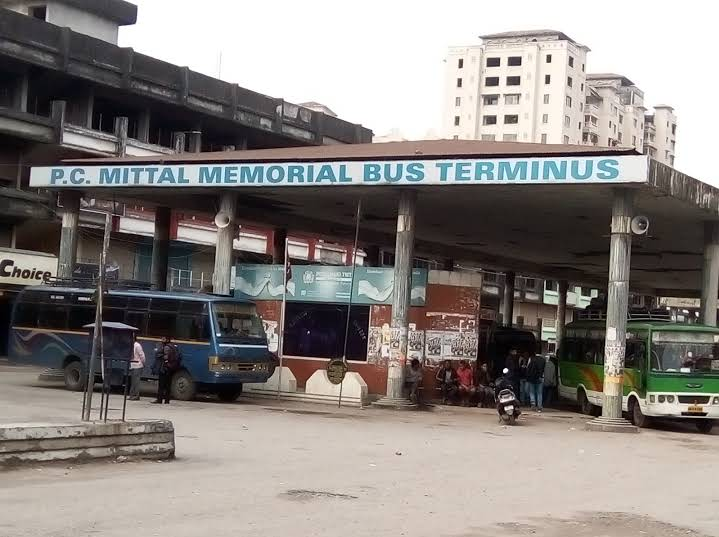
- Front View of P.C. Mittal Memorial Bus Terminus; P.C. Mittal Memorial Bus Terminus, Siliguri

General information
- Other names: Dooars Bus Stand
- Location: Sevoke road, Siliguri–734001 Dist: Darjeeling, West Bengal; India
- Coordinates: 26.74195°N 88.434638°E
- Elevation: 120 metres (390 ft)
- System: Private Bus Terminus
- Owner: PCM Group of Industries
- Operator: Siliguri Municipal Corporation
- Platforms: 28
- Bus routes: 10present
- Bus operators: NBSTC and Private operators
- Connections: North Bengal, Bhutan

Construction
- Structure type: Standard
- Parking: Available
- Cycle facilities: Available
- Accessible: ♿ Ok

Other information
- Fare zone: Siliguri

History
- Opened: 03/02/2001

Passengers
- 5,000 -20,000 per day
Location
- Location within West Bengal Location within India

The P.C. Mittal Memorial Bus Terminus is a bus terminal located on Sevoke Road, Siliguri, District Darjeeling. It is from 5.4 km (3.4 mi) from Siliguri Junction railway station and about 8.2 km (5.1 mi) from New Jalpaiguri Railway Station. Both State owned North Bengal State Transport Corporation (NBSTC) buses and private buses ply from here. Some bus routes may be shifted to this terminal to reduce traffic congestion. The Terminus is named after P.C. Mittal, a social worker and a businessman, who was a resident of the Darjeeling District.

This bus terminus is maintained by Siliguri Municipal Corporation. In 2021, plans to refurbish the terminus were announced. The buses from this station connects Alipurduar district, Kalimpong District, Cooch Behar district and Jalpaiguri district of West Bengal.

== Amenities ==
- Parking
- Washroom
- Restroom
- Food stall
- Bookstore
- Newspaper seller
- Information center
- 24×7 Transit
- Ola Cabs, Uber, Rapido

== Bus routes ==
- Siliguri-Jaigaon
- Siliguri-Malbazar
- Siliguri-Cooch Bihar
- Siliguri-Alipurduar
- Siliguri-Phuentsholing
- Siliguri-Gorubathan
- Siliguri-Birpara
- Siliguri-Sevoke-Odlabari
- Siliguri-Hasimara
- Siliguri-Binnaguri
- Siliguri-Lataguri
- Siliguri-Banarhat
- Siliguri-Lava
- Siliguri-Jaldhaka
- Siliguri-Kalchini
- Siliguri-Gairkata

== See also ==
- Tenzing Norgay Bus Terminus (Siliguri)
- Sikkim Nationalised Transport Bus Terminus (Siliguri)
