= Kaljani River =

Stream in India and Bhutan

Coordinates: 26.5124°N 89.4601°E

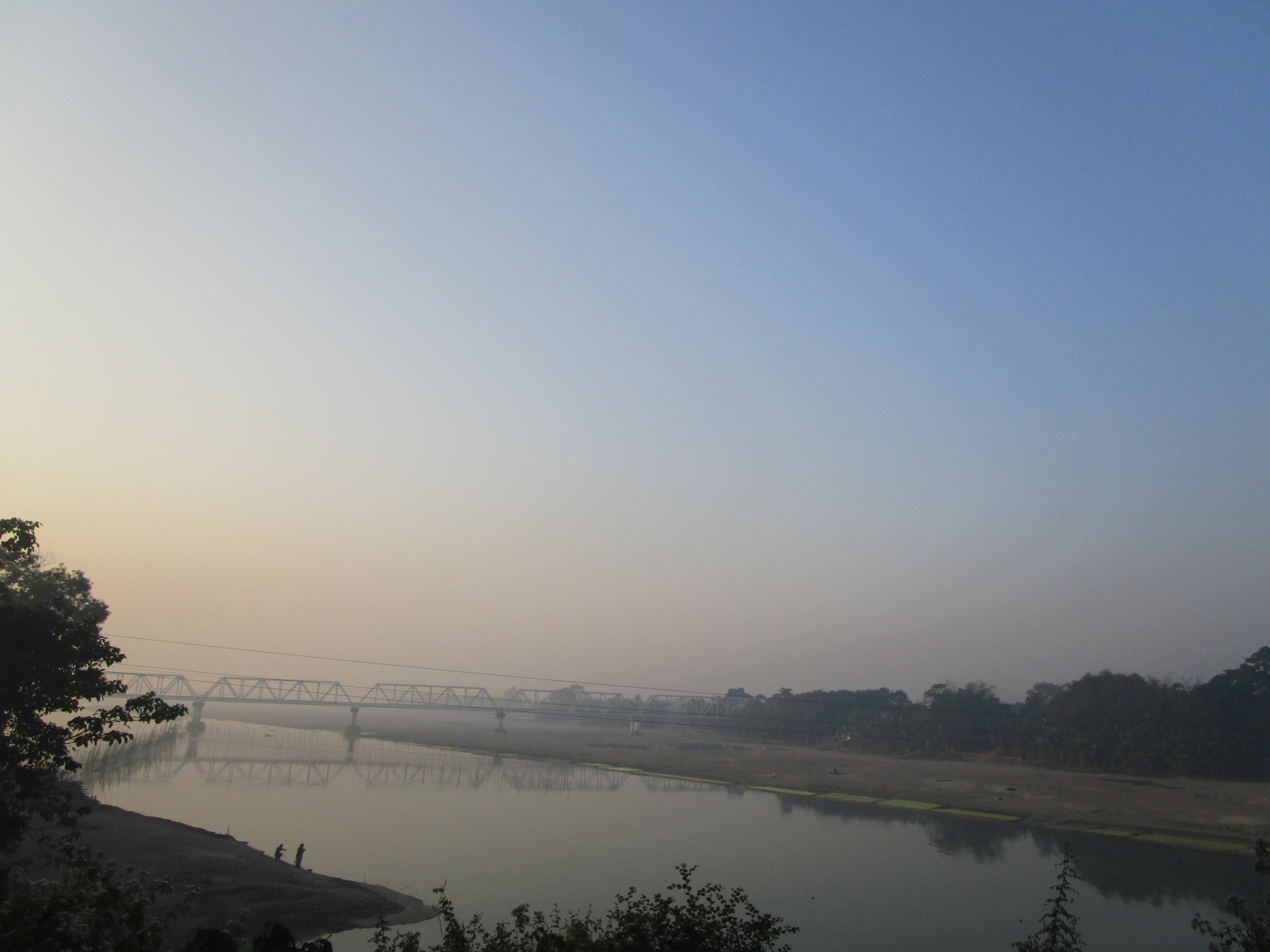
Kaljani River

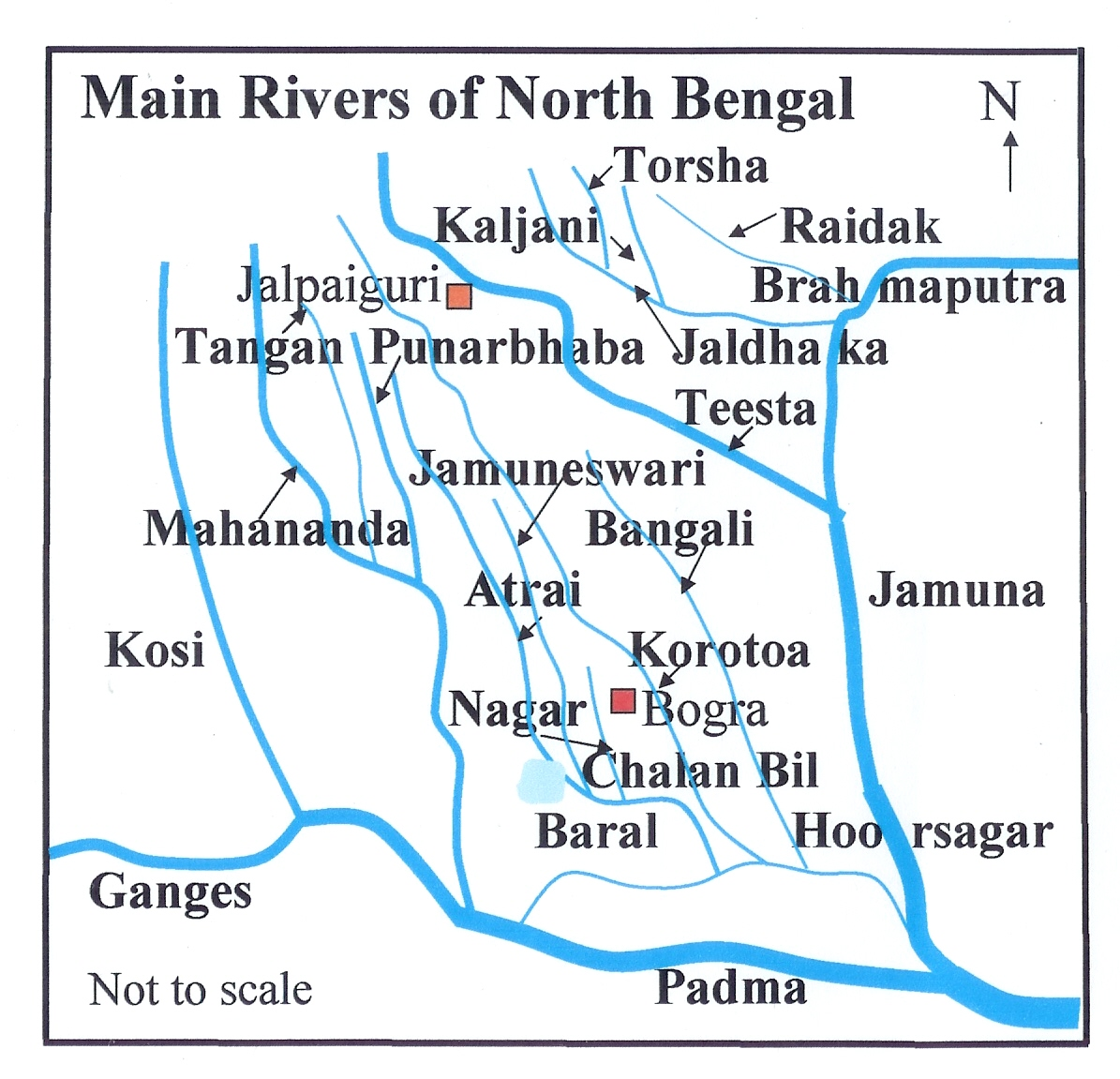
Kaljani shown within the rivers of North Bengal

Kaljani River (Bengali: কালজানী) is a tributary of Torsha river, originated (26°50'24"N 89°26'28"E) in Bhutan at the foothills of the Himalayas and it flows from north to south via Bhutan & India and converges (26°16'25"N 89°35'01"E) with Torsha river that again converges with Brahmaputra river which converges with Padma river that merges with Bay of Bengal. Kaljani river and its tributaries are attractions of the Dooars[] Major tributaries of Kaljani are Dima, Nonai, etc. The major portion of the river flows through the Indian state West Bengal. In 1993, towns like Alipurduar, Hamiltanganj on its bank was flooded when retaining wall of dam leaked and thrashed while letting the river enter in town killing hundreds of people and animals.

== Major places on the bank ==
Phuentsholing, Jaigaon, Hamiltanganj, Nimti, Dakshin Barajhor Forest, Alipurduar, Chilakhana are some places situated on Kaljani river's bank.
