= Tenzing Norgay Bus Terminus =

Bus terminal in North Bengal, India

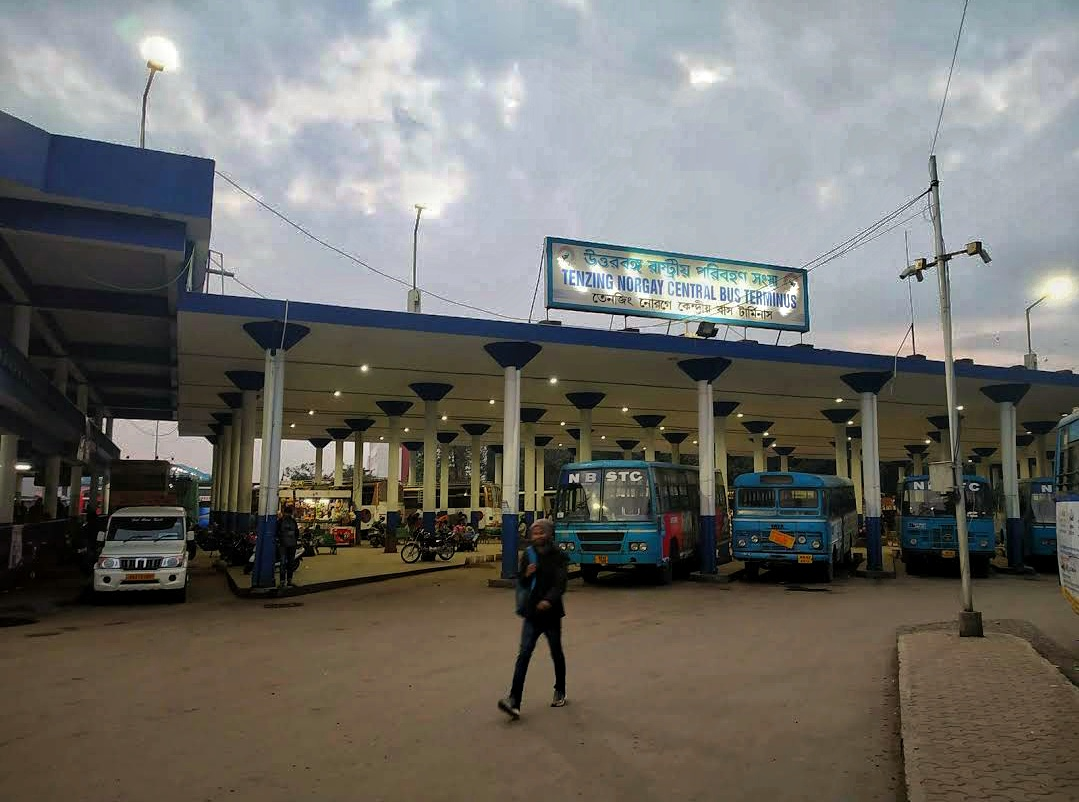
- Tenzing Norgay Central bus terminus, Siliguri

General information
- Other names: Siliguri Junction Bus Stand
- Location: Near Siliguri Railway Station, Hill Cart Rd, Pradhan Nagar, Siliguri–734001 Dist: Darjeeling, West Bengal; India
- Coordinates: 26.7252°N 88.4148°E
- Elevation: 120 metres (390 ft)
- System: Central Bus Terminus
- Owner: North Bengal State Transport Corporation
- Operator: North Bengal State Transport Corporation
- Platforms: 25
- Bus routes: 20present
- Bus operators: NBSTC and Private operators
- Connections: National; Assam, Bihar, Jharkhand, Sikkim, South Bengal, Meghalaya, Arunachal Pradesh, International; Bhutan, Nepal, Bangladesh

Construction
- Structure type: Standard
- Parking: Available
- Cycle facilities: Available
- Accessible: ♿ Yes

Other information
- Fare zone: Siliguri
- Website: nbstc.in/index2.aspx

History
- Opened: 1984

Passengers
- 1,50,000 per day
Location
- Location within West Bengal Location within India

The Tenzing Norgay Central Bus Terminus is one of the largest and most important bus terminals in North Bengal. It is located on Hill Cart Road, Siliguri, District Darjeeling, adjacent to the Siliguri Junction railway station, about 6 kilometers from New Jalpaiguri Railway Station. Both state owned North Bengal State Transport Corporation (NBSTC) buses and private buses ply from here. The terminus is named after Nepali mountaineer Tenzing Norgay who was a resident of the Darjeeling District and was one of the two mountaineers to have reached the summit of Mount Everest for the first time in histor.

In August 2017 the state government announced its plan to shift the private buses operations to a proposed new site nearby and upgrade the terminus to international standards.

== International bus service ==
From the year of 2022 Greenline Paribahan (NBSTC) operated bus service is available from Siliguri (India) to Kathmandu (Nepal) daily, also BRTC, Shyamoli Paribahan operated daily bus is available from Siliguri to Dhaka (Bangladesh), Bhutan bus service also available from Siliguri to Phuntsholing (Bhutan).

== Distance from towns/cities ==
National	Kilometres
Kurseong	36 km
Darjeeling	64.4 km
Mirik	48.3 km
Kalimpong	65.7 km
Siliguri	1 km
Jalpaiguri	50 km
New Jalpaiguri Railway Station	5.9 km
Gangtok	113 km
Rangpo	76 km
Bagdogra International Airport	14.1 km
Pakyong Airport	120 km
Guwahati	474 km
Kolkata	590 km
International
Kakarbhitta (Nepal Border)	30.3 km
Kathmandu (Capital of Nepal)	488 km
Bhadrapur Airport (Nepal - also known as Chandragadhi Airport)	51.3 km
Dharan (Nepal)	138 km
Biratnagar (Nepal)	138 km
Phuntsholing (Bhutan Border)	155 km
Thimpu (capital of Bhutan)	319 km
Nathula (China Border)	170 km
Fulbari or Phulbari (Bangladesh border)	11.7 km
Dhaka (capital of Bangladesh)	472 km

== See also ==
- Sikkim Nationalised Transport Bus Terminus (Siliguri)
- P.C. Mittal Memorial Bus Terminus (Siliguri)
- Siliguri Junction railway station
- Siliguri Corridor
- New Jalpaiguri Railway Station
