= Torsa River =

Coordinates: 26.279°N 89.580°E

Torsa River Machu, Amo Chhu
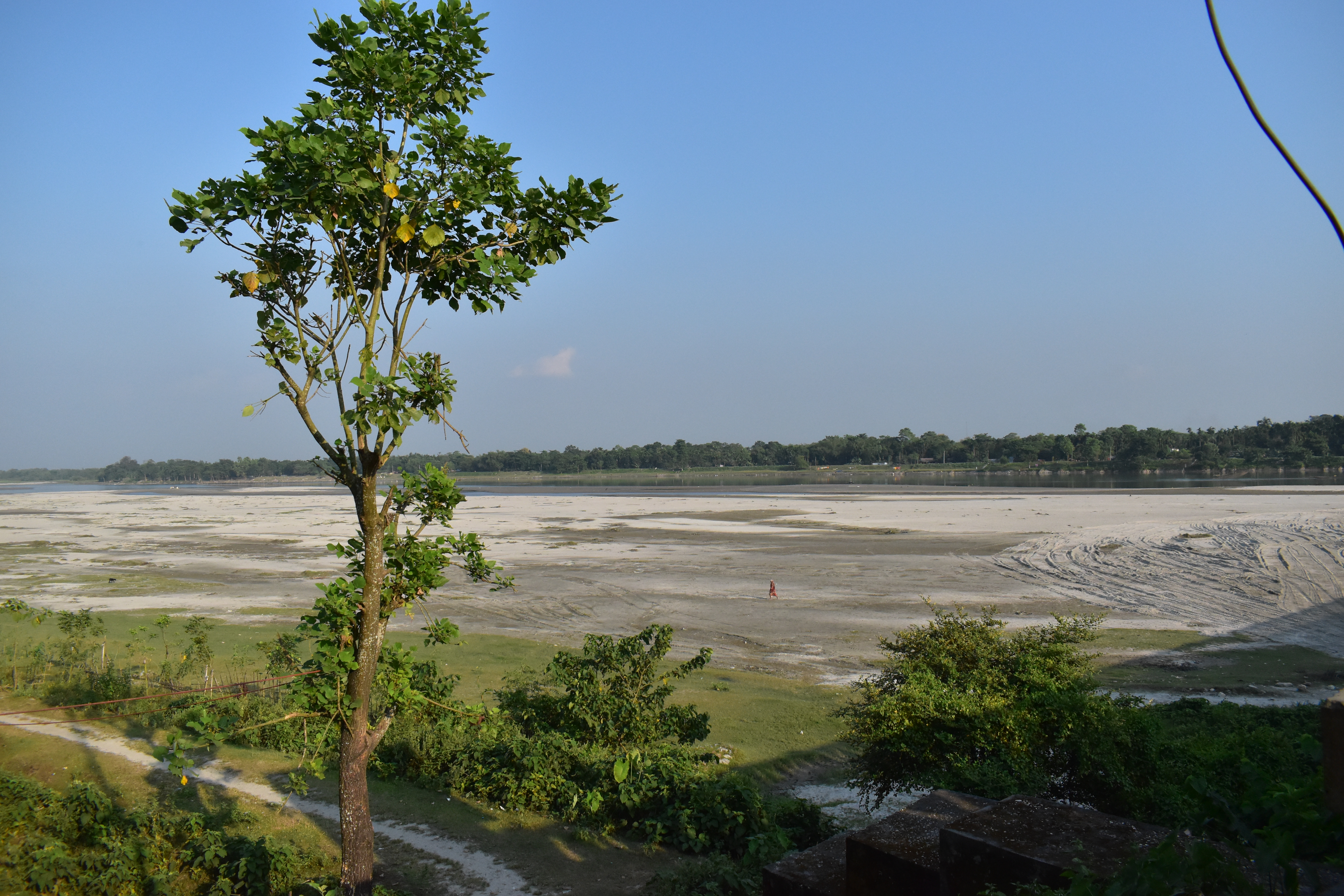
- Torsa River near Cooch Behar

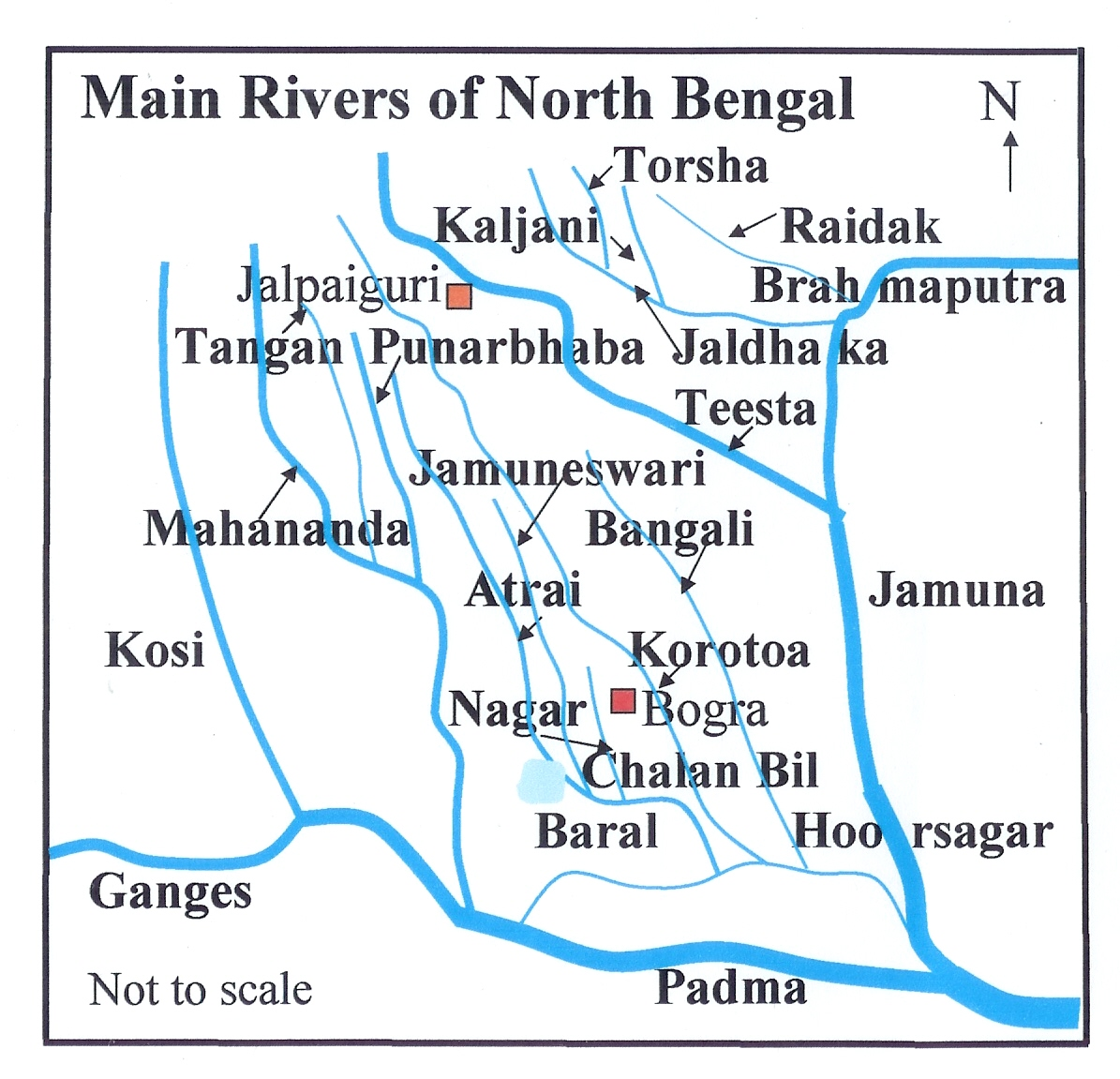

Location
- Country: China, Bhutan, India, Bangladesh
- Cities: Phuntsholing, Jaigaon, Hasimara, Cooch Behar

Physical characteristics
- Mouth: Brahmaputra River
- Length: 358 km (222 mi)

Basin features
- Tributaries
  - left: Kaljani

The Torsa River (also spelt Torsha and also known as Kambu Maqu, Machu and Amo Chhu) rises from the Chumbi Valley in Tibet, China, where it is known as Machu. Its course continues into Bhutan, India, and Bangladesh before joining the Brahmaputra River into the Bay of Bengal.

== Course ==
From Tibet, the Torsa flows into Bhutan, where it is known as the Amo Chu. It has a length of 358 kilometres (222 mi) before entering India, of which 113 kilometres (70 mi) are in Tibet and 145 kilometres (90 mi) in Bhutan. After entering West Bengal in India, it is known as the Torsa. In Bangladesh too, it is known by the same name. It is also known as Chumbi, Am-Chu, and Jaldhaka.

Afterwards, the river flows past the border towns of Phuntsholing (in Bhutan) and Jaigaon, and Hasimara (in India) and past the tea estate of Dalsingpara and the Jaldapara National Park. Ghargharia River meets with Torsa in the Tufanganj subdivision, near Deocharai and Balarampur. Torsa meets with Kaljani and then flows into Bangladesh by the name of Kaljani and meets with Brahmaputra in BD. A distributary known as the Buri Torsa meets Jaldhaka.

Ghargharia River meets with the Torsa in the Tufanganj subdivision, near Deocharai and the Balarampur Torsa meets with the Kaljani and then flows into Bangladesh by the name of the Kaljani and meets with the Jamuna there.

== Major towns and cities ==
The major towns along the river's banks are:

- Phuntsholing, in Bhutan
- Jaigaon in India
- Hasimara in India
- Cooch Behar, in India
- Torsa Strict Nature Reserve, upstream in Bhutan

== Hydro projects ==
- Amo chu Hydro Power Project, By NTPC Limited

== Floods ==
The Torsha River, along with the Jaldhaka River and Teesta River, has created major flooding multiple times in Bangladesh during the monsoon season between June and September.
