= Maladera phuntsholingensis =

Scientific classification
- Kingdom: Animalia
- Phylum: Arthropoda
- Class: Insecta
- Order: Coleoptera
- Suborder: Polyphaga
- Infraorder: Scarabaeiformia
- Family: Scarabaeidae
- Genus: Maladera
- Species: M. phuntsholingensis

Binomial name
- Maladera phuntsholingensis Ahrens, 2004

Species of beetle

Maladera phuntsholingensis is a species of beetle of the family Scarabaeidae. It is found in India (Meghalaya) and Bhutan.

== Description ==
Adults reach a length of about 6.1–6.6 mm. They have a dark to reddish-brown, oval body. The head and pronotum sometimes have a faint greenish shine. The upper surface is dull and glabrous, except for a few setae on the head and the lateral cilia of the pronotum and elytra.

== Etymology ==
The species name is derived from its type locality, Phuntsholing.
