= Naliya Air Force Station =

Air force station in Gujarat, India

- IATA: none; ICAO: VANY

Summary
- Airport type: Military
- Operator: Indian Air Force
- Location: Naliya, Gujarat, India
- Elevation AMSL: 142 ft / 43 m
- Coordinates: 23°13′12″N 68°54′00″E

Map

Runways
Direction	Length		Surface
Direction	m	ft	Surface
06/24	2,743	9,000	Concrete

Naliya Air Force Station (ICAO: VANY) of the Indian Air Force (IAF) is located in Naliya in Gujarat, India. It is about 90 km from Sir Creek that forms the border with Pakistan. It lies on National Highway 41 or NH 41. It is about 90 km from Bhuj.

== History ==
It was home to No. 101 Squadron IAF in India, which as of May 2024, relocated to Hasimara AFS. It consists of 12 FBSU (Forward Base Supporting units) and MiG-21 Bison. Later it was upgraded to the 49th Wing in 2009. Currently,No. 101 Squadron IAF at Hasimara AFS hosts one of the only two squadrons of Dassault Rafale.

As of September 2024, No. 18 Squadron IAF, equipped with the indigenous HAL Tejas, has been relocated to this base. The change was done before Exercise Tarang Shakti.

== Facilities ==
The airbase is situated at an elevation of 21 m (21 metres (69 ft)) above mean sea level. It has one runway with concrete surfaces: 06/24 measuring 9000 by 148 feet (2,743 m x 45 m).
