= Deshalpur railway station =

Railway station in Gujarat, India

Deshalpur

General information
- Location: Sanatan Patidar Wadi Rd, Deshalpur, Kutch district, Gujarat; India
- Coordinates: 23°12′04″N 69°26′09″E
- Elevation: 175 metres (574 ft)
- System: Indian Railways station
- Owner: Indian Railways
- Operator: Western Railway
- Line: Gandhidham–Naliya line
- Platforms: 1
- Tracks: 2
- Connections: Auto stand

Construction
- Structure type: Standard (on-ground station)

Other information
- Status: Active
- Station code: DSLP
- Zone(s): Western Railway
- Division(s): Ahmedabad

Services
Preceding station	Indian Railways	Following station
Sukhpur towards ?	Western Railway zone Gandhidham–Naliya line	Sukhpur Roha towards ?
Location
- Location within Gujarat

Deshalpur railway station is a small railway station in Kutch district, Gujarat, in India. Its code is DSLP. The station consists of 1 platform. It serves Deshalpur village and is located in the vicinity of an archaeological site belonging to the Indus Valley Civilisation.

The station had a metre-gauge railway line laid in 1980 to get connected with the town of Bhuj. The line was abandoned later since Gandhidham–Bhuj section got converted to broad gauge and this 101.24 km line became isolated. Recently gauge conversion to broad gauge has been approved by the Government of India in June 2016, so that it can be used for public, military or freight purpose. In 2018 the railway section between Bhuj and Deshalpur village (28 km) was commissioned, remaining under gauge conversion Deshalpur–Naliya section (74 km). As of December 2019 there are not any train services from and to this station.

Bhuj–Naliya railway line is classified as being of strategic importance, due to its proximity to the border with Pakistan and Naliya Air Force Station.

There is a project to extend the line up to Vayor village, 25 km northwest of Naliya.
