= Nirang Pajhra =

Nirang Pajhra (Hindi: निरंग पझरा) is a multilingual Adivasi magazine, published from Madhu Bagan, Hasimara, Dist. Alipurduar, West Bengal. The title has been registered with the government of India.

The magazine publishes analytical news and views related to the Jharkhandi Society of India which have been spread over in Jharkhand, West Bengal, Assam, Orissa, Chhattisgarh, Madhya Pradesh, Uttar Pradesh, Tripura, Delhi and all the other metros and towns in India. The magazine is edited by Oliva Arjun Indwar. Nirang Pajhra contains articles in Hindi, English, Sadri, Kurukh, Oraon, Mundari, and Kharia languages on social, culture, language, and Adivasi rights. This is the first multilingual Adivasi magazine in (Dooars and Terai of Jalpaiguri, Alipurduar and Darjeeling districts) West Bengal.
