= Sikkim Nationalised Transport Bus Terminus =

Bus terminal in North Bengal, India

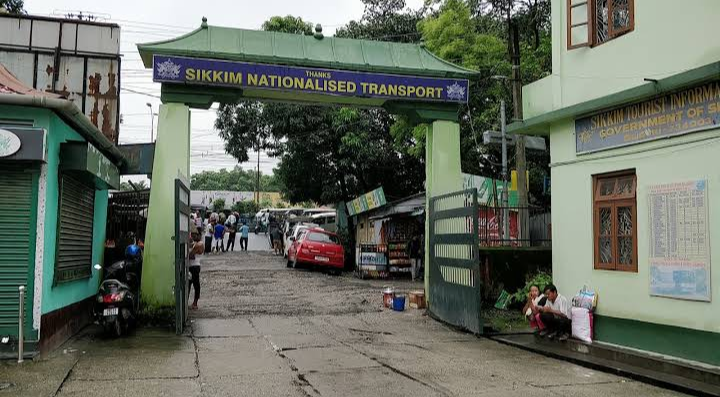

General information
- Other names: Sikkim Bus Stand
- Location: Near Tenzing Norgey Central Bus Terminus, Hill Cart Rd, Pradhan Nagar, Siliguri–734001 Dist: Darjeeling, West Bengal; India
- Coordinates: 26.7242°N 88.4175°E
- Elevation: 120 metres (390 ft)
- System: Nationalised Bus Terminus
- Owner: Government of Sikkim
- Operator: Sikkim Nationalised Transport
- Bus operators: SNT(Sikkim Nationalised Transport)
- Connections: Sikkim

Construction
- Structure type: Standard
- Parking: Available
- Cycle facilities: Available
- Accessible: ♿ Ok

Other information
- Fare zone: Siliguri
- Website: www.sntd.in/about.html

History
- Opened: 1999

Passengers
- 5,000-20,000 per day
Location
- Location within West Bengal Location within India

The Sikkim Nationalised Transport Bus Terminus is one of the most important bus terminals in North Bengal. It is located on Hill Cart Road, Siliguri, Darjeeling, and is adjacent to the Siliguri Junction railway station, about six kilometres (3.7 mi) New Jalpaiguri Railway Station. It is operated by the transport department of the Government of Sikkim. Mainly Sikkim based bus service is available on this bus terminus.

== Amenities ==
- Parking
- Washroom
- Restroom
- Food-stall
- Bookstore
- Newspaper seller
- Information center
- 24×7 Transit
- Ola Cabs, Uber, Rapido (company) service available

== Bus Route ==
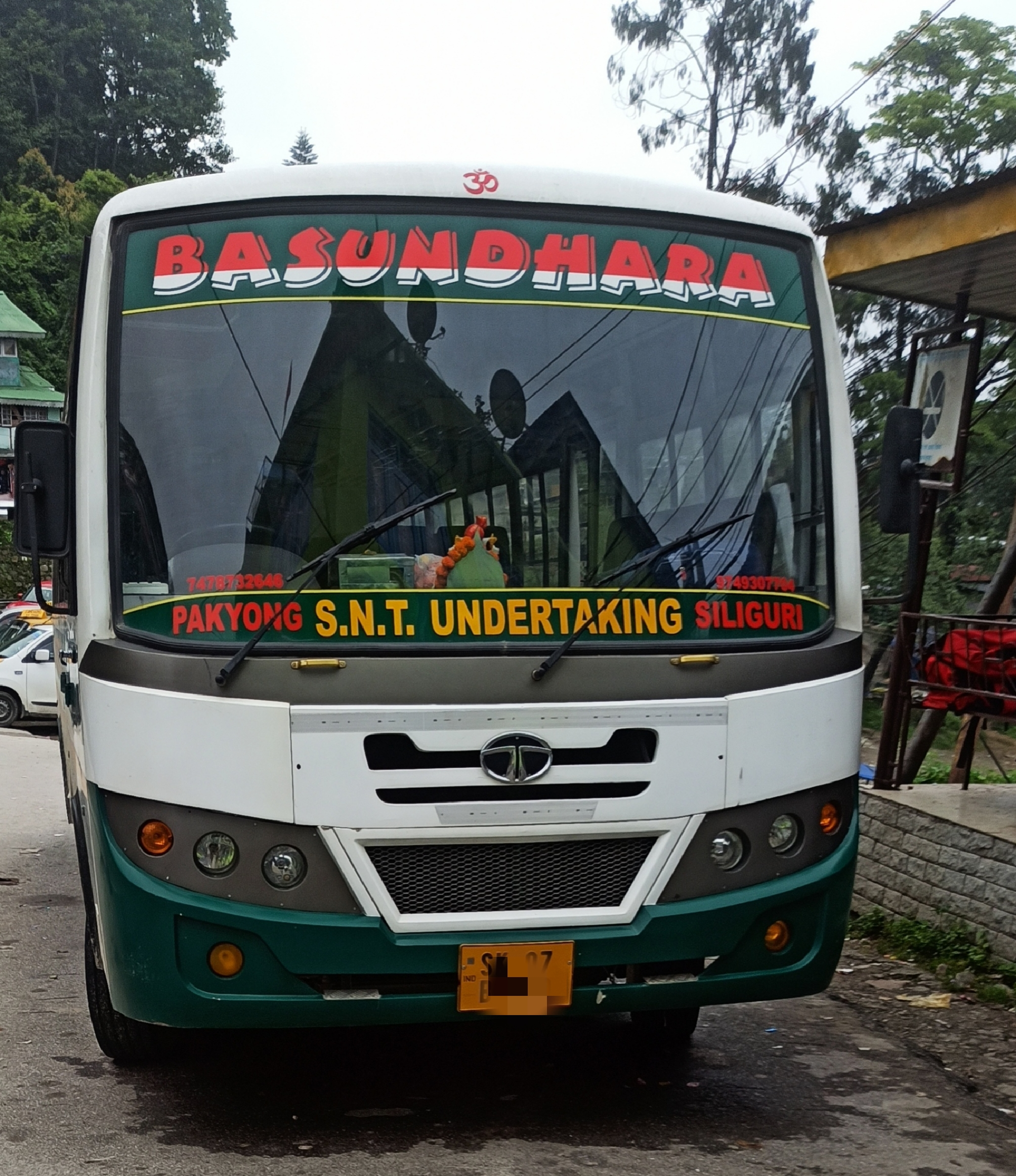
Pakyong to Siliguri Bus undertaken by SNT

- Siliguri-Pakyong
- Siliguri-Jorethang
- Siliguri-Gangtok
- Siliguri-Mangan
- Siliguri-Pelling
- Siliguri-Rangpo
- Siliguri-Singtam
- Siliguri-Namchi
- Siliguri-Majitar
- Siliguri-Kumrek
- Siliguri-Rongli
- Siliguri-Gyalshing
- Siliguri-Namthang
- Siliguri-Ravangla
- Siliguri-Chungthang

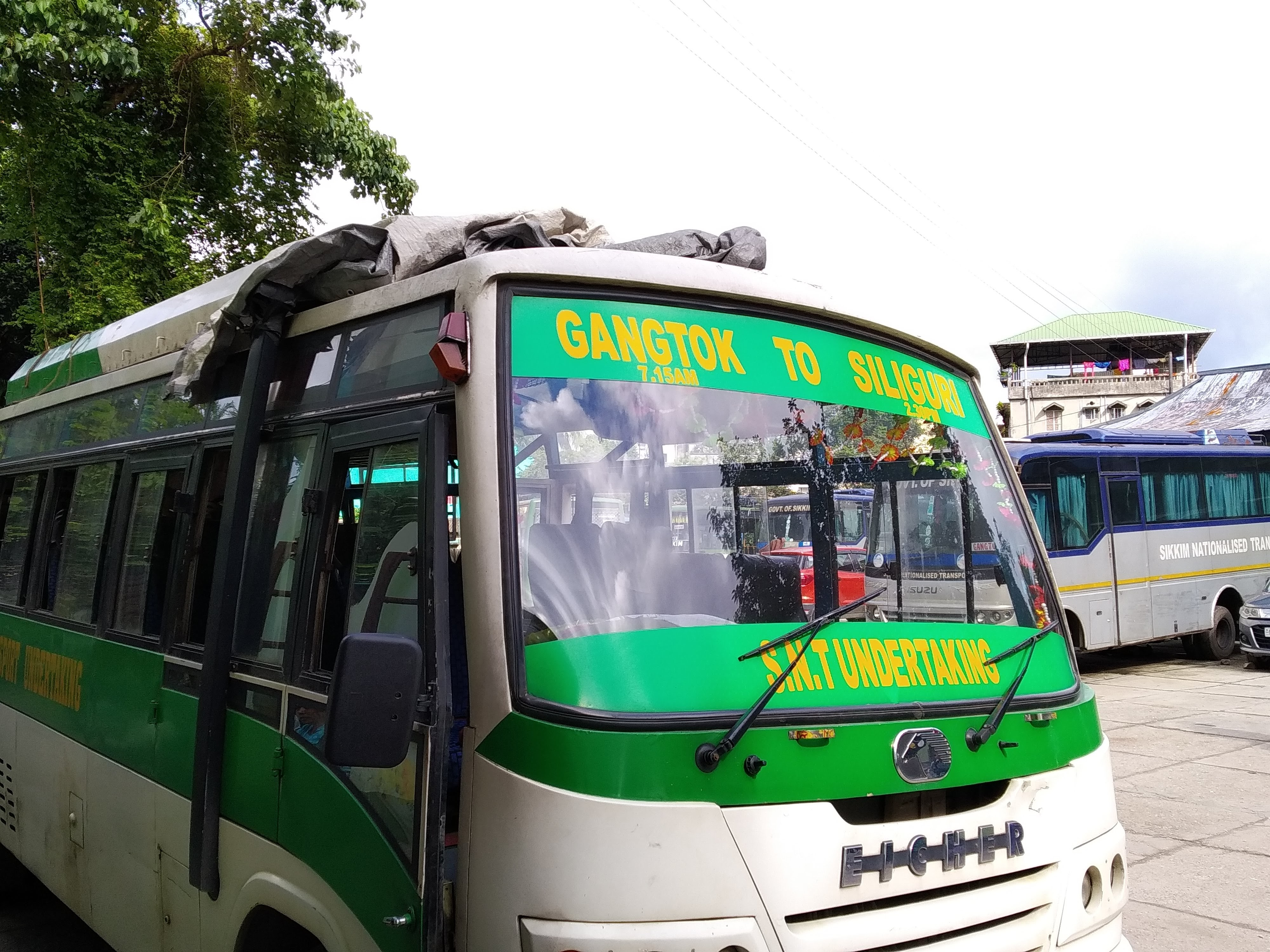
Gangtok to Siliguri Bus (undertaken by SNT) in SNT Bus Terminus, Siliguri

== See also ==
- Tenzing Norgay Bus Terminus, Siliguri
- P.C. Mittal Memorial Bus Terminus, Siliguri
