= No. 101 Squadron IAF =

Indian Air Force squadron

No. 101 Squadron Falcons
- Insignia of No. 101 Squadron IAF "Falcons"
- Active: 1 May 1949 - January 2011; June 2021 - Present
- Country: Republic of India
- Allegiance: Indian Armed Forces
- Branch: Indian Air Force
- Role: Fighter
- Garrison/HQ: Hasimara AFS
- Nickname: "Falcons"
- Mottos: Anwishyavedhi; Search and Destroy
- Engagements: India-Pakistan war of 1965; India-Pakistan war of 1971

Commanders
- Current commander: Group Captain Abhisek Tripathi

Aircraft flown
- Fighter: Dassault Rafale

The No. 101 Squadron nicknamed as Falcons is an Indian Air Force fighter aircraft squadron which is equipped with the Dassault Rafale and is based at the Hasimara Air Force Station.

== History ==
101 Squadron was formed with the specific role of photo reconnaissance. Enjoying the place of pride in the Squadron crest is a trained hunting Falcon, the bird's keen eyesight, quick and sure kill ability symbolises the role for which the Squadron was formed. The unit was equipped with four Harvards, two Spitfires, eight pilots and fifty five airmen. The first commanding officer was Flight Lieutenant John Frederick Shukla.

The squadron was reinstated with Dassault Rafale in June 2021 and was inducted into Hasimara, West Bengal on 28 July 2021.

== Present ==
The squadron was reinstated in June 2021 with 5 Dassault Rafale in Ambala. The squadron was commissioned in its designated base in Hasimara from 28 July 2021.

=== Assignments ===
- Indo-Pakistani War of 1965
- Indo-Pakistani War of 1971

== Aircraft ==
Aircraft types operated by the squadron

Aircraft type	From	To	Air base
Harvard	June 1949	February 1957	Palam AFS
Supermarine Spitfire	June 1949	February 1957	Palam AFS
de Havilland Vampire	February 1957	July 1968	Adampur AFS
Sukhoi Su-7	July 1968	June 1981	Adampur AFS
MiG-21 M	June 1981	2002	Sirsa AFS
MiG-21 M	2002	January 2011	Adampur AFS
Dassault Rafale	28 July 2021	Present	Hasimara AFS

== Gallery ==
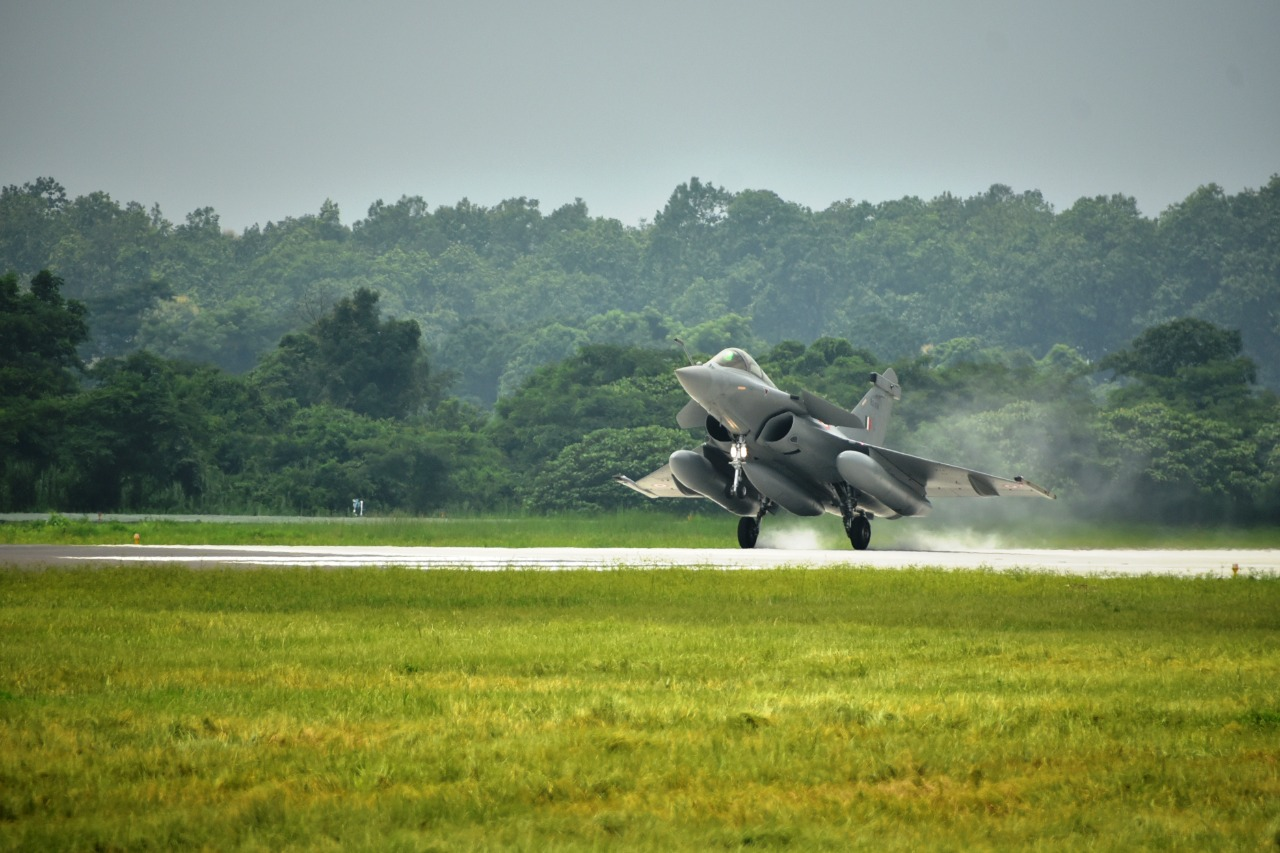
Dassault Rafale of Indian Air Force squadron 101 landing in Hasimara, West Bengal.

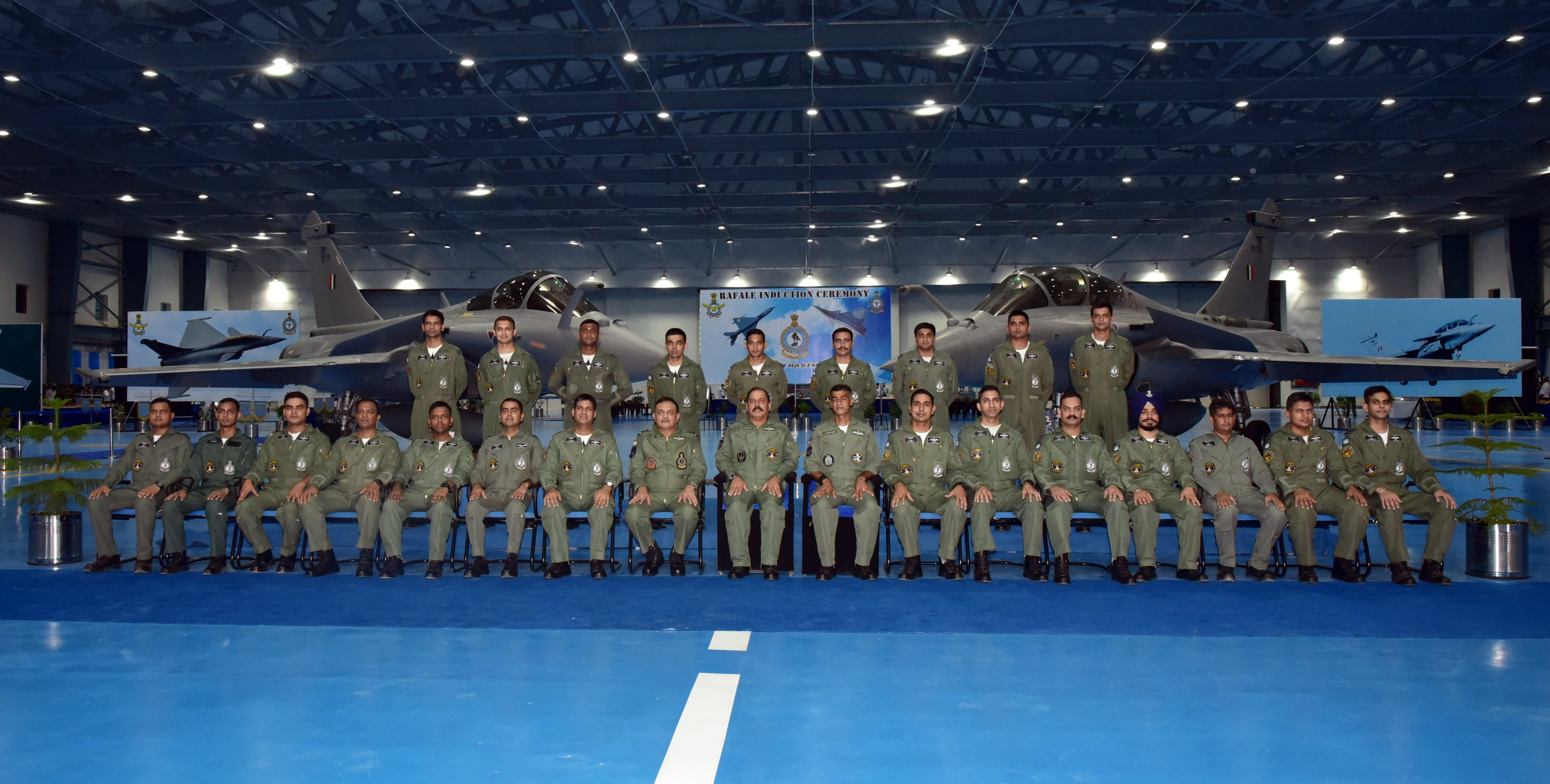
Air Chief Marshal RKS Bhadauria interacting with the Rafale pilots of 101 Sqn.

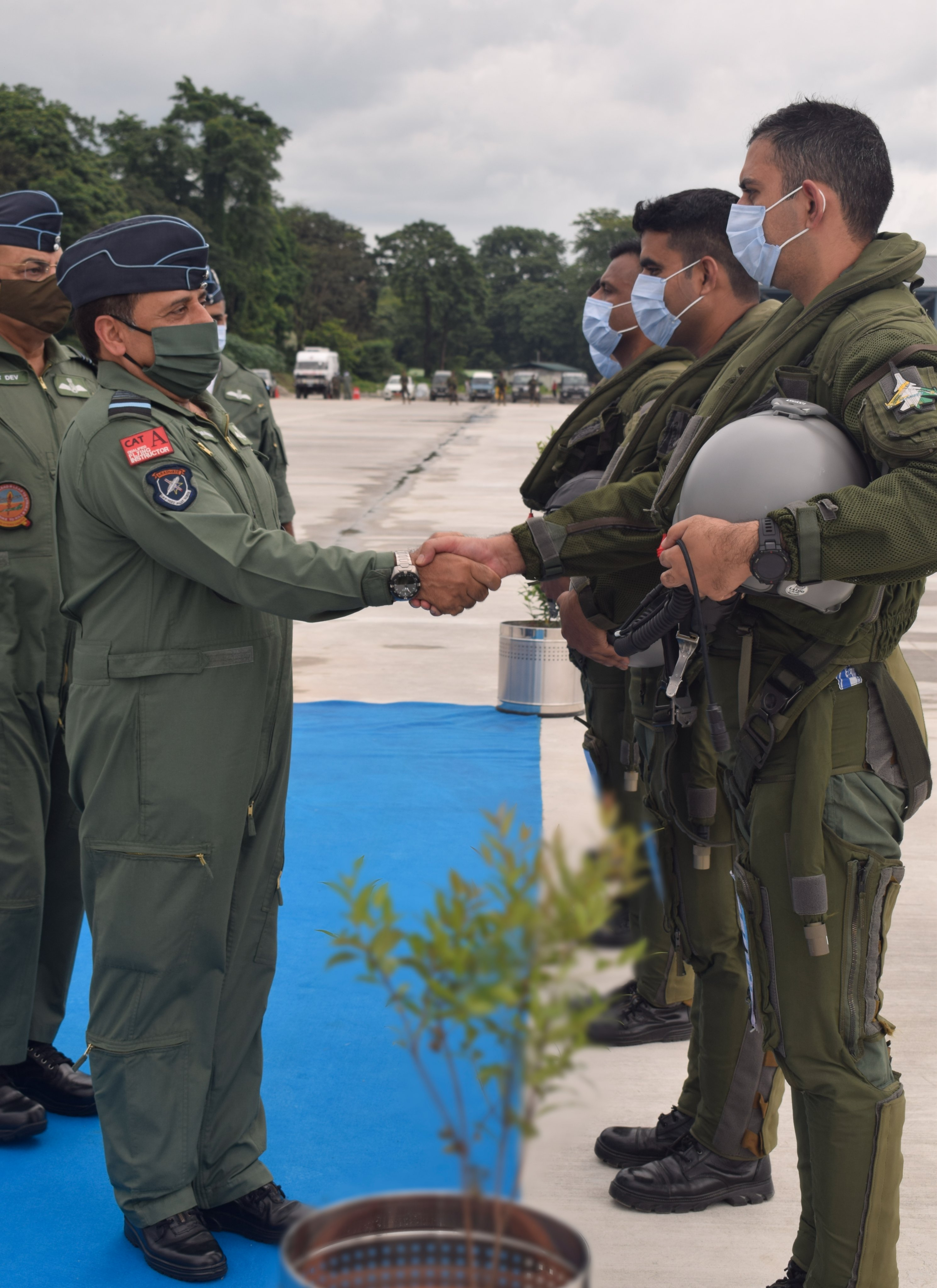
Air Chief Marshal RKS Bhadauria during induction ceremony of 101 Squadron.
