= Jaigaon =

- Census Town
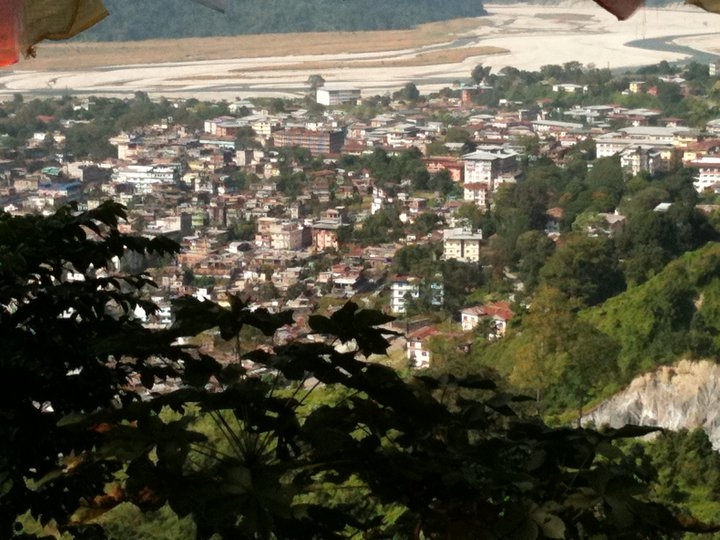
- Jaigaon from the kharbandi (Bhutan)

- Location in West Bengal, India, Jaigaon (India)
- Coordinates: 26.83°N 89.38°E
- Country: India
- State: West Bengal
- District: Alipurduar

Government
  - MLA: Bishal Lama
  - MP: Manoj Tigga

Population (2011)
  - Total: 42,254

Languages
  - Official: Bengali
  - Additional official: English
- Time zone: UTC+5:30 (IST)
- PIN: 736182
- Vehicle registration: WB
- Lok Sabha Constituency: Alipurduar (ST)
- Vidhan Sabha constituency: Kalchini (ST)
- Website: www.alipurduar.org www.wbdma.gov.in/HTM/MUNI_JDA.htm

Jaigaon (Bengali pronunciation: [d͡ʒɔe̯ɡão]) is a census town in Alipurduar subdivision under Kalchini Block of Alipurduar district in the state of West Bengal, India. It is located on the country's border with Bhutan, and Bhutan Gate separates the two countries. Phuentsholing is the Bhutan's nearest city to Jaigaon. Bhutan does not have domestic roads linking all its towns, so it uses roads passing through Jaigaon to reach destinations such as Samtse, Gomtu, Nganglam and Samdrup Jongkhar.

== Geography ==
Places and tea estates in the eastern portion of Alipurdar subdivision (including Kalchini, Kumargram and Alipuduar II CD blocks) in Alipurduar district
CT: census town, R: rural/ urban centre, N: neighbourhood, A: Air Force Station, NP: national park/ wildlife sanctuary, TE: tea estate, H: historical site
Abbreviations used in names – TG for Tea Garden (town/village), TE for Tea Estate
Owing to space constraints in the small map, the actual locations in a larger map may vary slightly

=== Location ===
Jaigaon is located at 26.83°N 89.38°E.

Jaigaon has a hilly, slopy terrain. The town is situated at the India-Bhutan border with Phuentsholing. There are several streams coming from the uphills and joining the river Toorsa at the downtown. Bagdogra Airport (Siliguri) is the nearest airport, and Kolkata its nearest port, where goods to Bhutan are brought from. Hasimara is the nearest railway station. National Highway 317A in India connects Jaigaon to Hasimara. India offers a free flow of goods from Kolkata port to Bhutan. It lies on the banks of the Torsa River.

=== Area overview ===
Alipurduar district is covered by two maps. It is an extensive area in the eastern end of the Dooars in West Bengal. It is undulating country, largely forested, with numerous rivers flowing down from the outer ranges of the Himalayas in Bhutan. It is a predominantly rural area with 79.38% of the population living in the rural areas. The district has 1 municipal town and 20 census towns and that means that 20.62% of the population lives in the urban areas. The scheduled castes and scheduled tribes, taken together, form more than half the population in all the six community development blocks in the district. There is a high concentration of tribal people (scheduled tribes) in the three northern blocks of the district.

Note: The map alongside presents some of the notable locations in the subdivision. All places marked in the map are linked in the larger full screen map.

== Environment ==
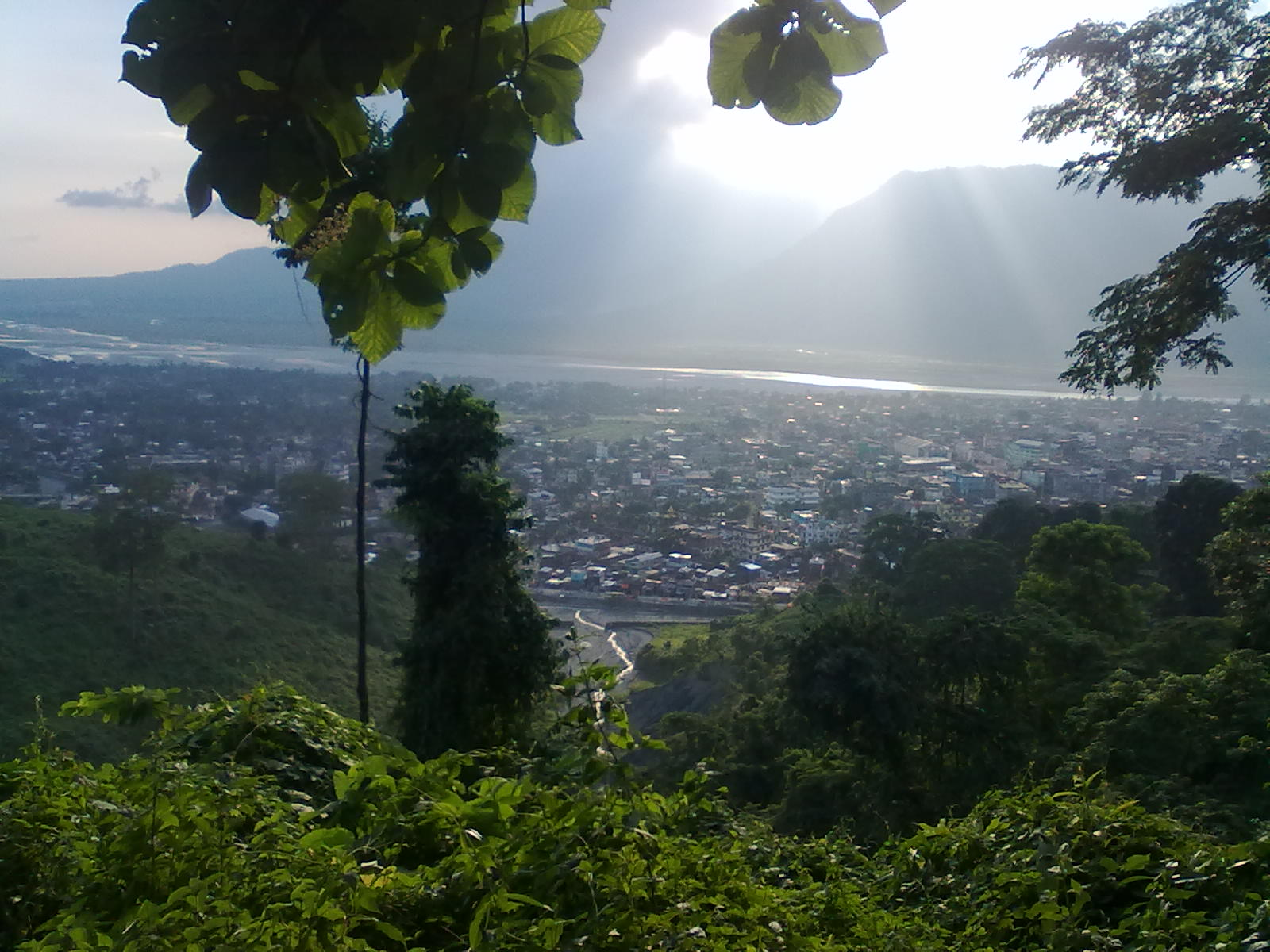
Hill Down View Of Jaigaon

Jaigaon is in a small valley located near the low-lying hills of the Himalayan mountains. Jaigaon receives an abundant amount of rainfall throughout the year. The outskirts of the city are demarcated by tea gardens. The Torsa River flows at the lower end of the town. High levels of in-migration to Jaigaon from elsewhere in India has caused the environmental conditions of the city to deteriorate. To solve the problem of non-potable drinking water, various bore wells and pump stations operate around the town, adding to the problem of the decreasing water table below the town.

== Demographic ==
As of census 2011 India census, Jaigaon had a population of 42,254. Males constitute 51.2% of the population and females 48.8%. Jaigaon has an average literacy rate of 60.52%.

Languages spoken in Jaigaon Town (2011)
1. Bengali (40.2%)
2. Rajbongshi (3.13%)
3. Nepali (23.6%)
4. Hindi (12.3%)
5. Bhojpuri (11.2%)
6. Marwari (1.62%)
7. Others (7.92%)

== Transport ==
=== Roadways ===
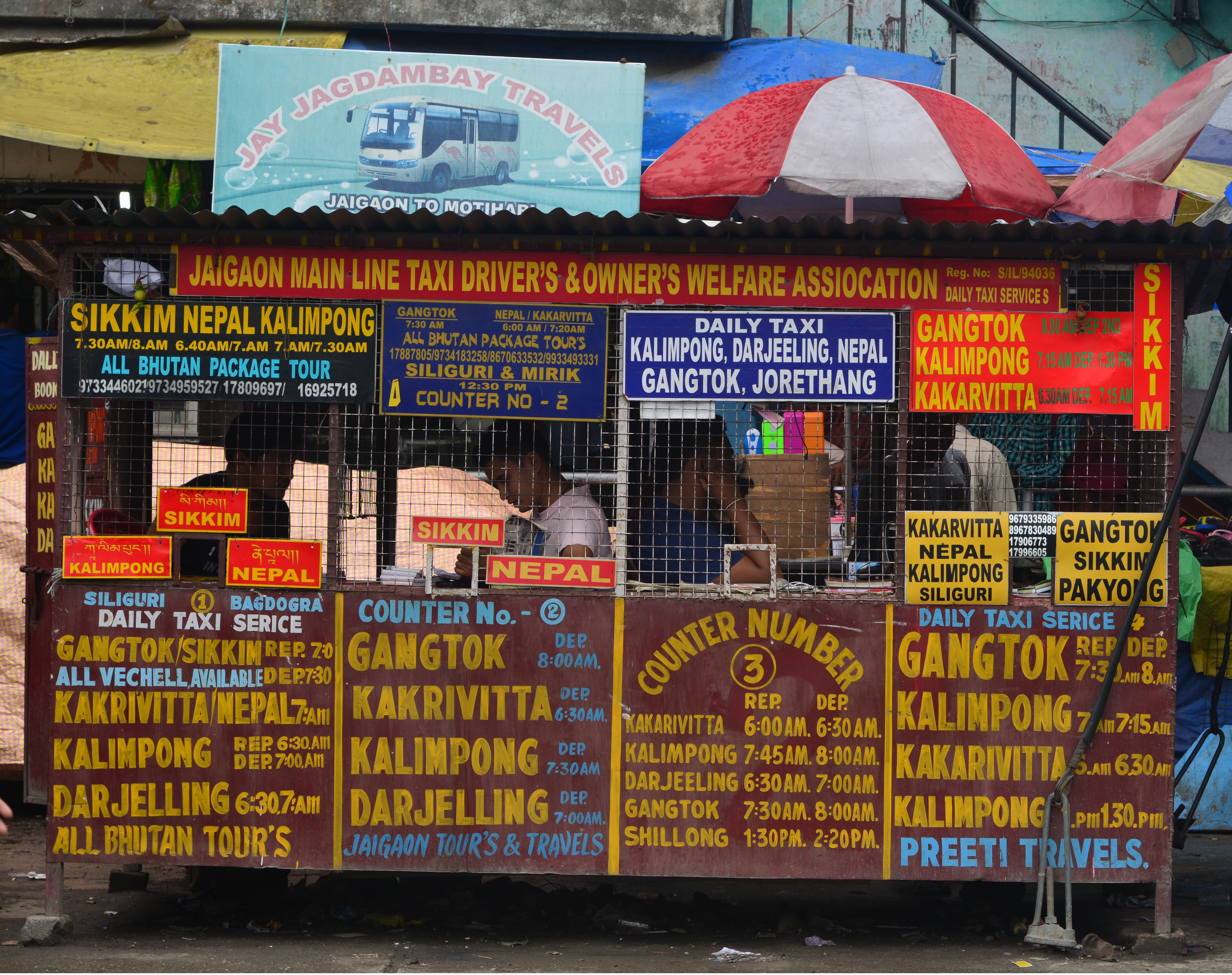
Taxi and bus reservation stand, Jaigaon

Jaigaon is connected to the nearby cities and towns with roads of good condition. Taxi and jeep services access Siliguri, Alipurduar, Jalpaiguri, Mainaguri, Malbazar, Birpara, Dhupguri, Gangtok, Kalimpong, Pakyong, Hasimara, Cooch Behar, Panitanki, Jorethang, Darjeeling, Namchi, Pelling, Thimphu-Bhutan, Phuntsholing-Bhutan etc.

Bus services connects Jaigaon with P.C. Mittal Memorial Bus Terminus, Siliguri. Frequent buses are also available from the town to all cities/towns mentioned above.

=== Railway ===
Hasimara Railway Station is the nearest railway station 15 Kilometres away from the town which falls under New Jalpaiguri–Alipurduar–Samuktala Road line of Northeast Frontier Railway.

=== Airways ===
Bagdogra International Airport, Siliguri is the nearest airport from Jaigaon.

== Education ==
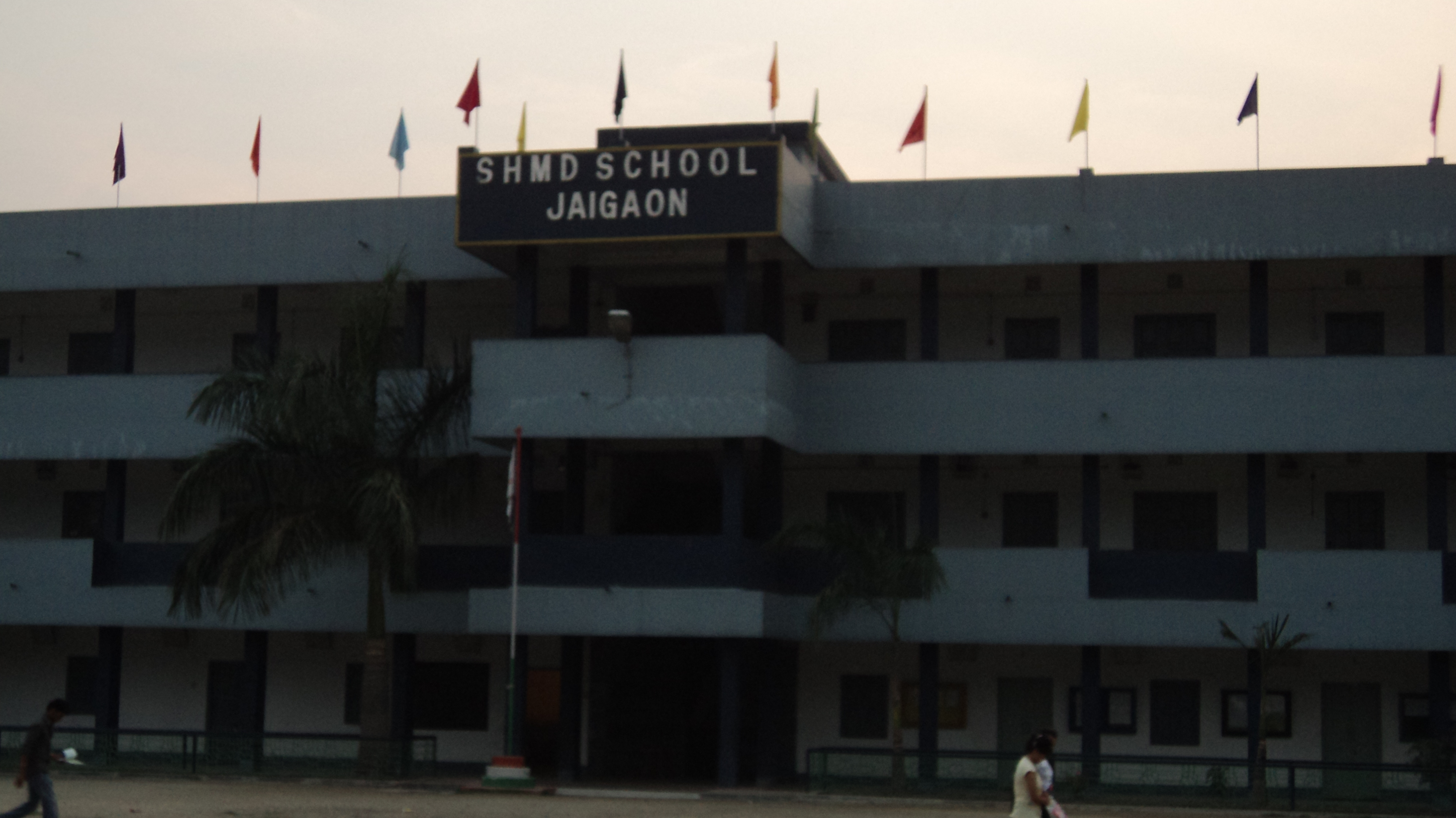
SHMD School

Jaigaon has several schools under various education boards of India. Schools such as Sunrise English School, St. Anthony's Convent, B.D Memorial English Higher Secondary School, and St. John's, follow the curriculum for the Indian Certificate of Secondary Education (ICSE) and Indian Certificate of Secondary Education § For classes XI, XII (ISC), administered by Council for the Indian School Certificate Examinations (CISCE). SHMD School is the only Central Board of Secondary Education (CBSE) school in Jaigaon. Schools like Ved Vyas, St. Dominic's, Chinary Academy, Zenith School, and Green View English School follow the state education board, whereas New Adarsh is an open board school.

Nani Bhattacharya Smarak Mahavidyalaya is an affiliated college of North Bengal University located in the vicinity of Jaigaon, and offers degrees in a variety of fields.

Many students in Jaigaon choose to pursue higher education in other parts of West Bengal, particularly in Siliguri and Kolkata, due to the lack of adequate college infrastructure and the absence of commerce or science colleges in their hometown.

== Culture ==
The lifestyle of Jaigaon is influenced by the town's diverse population of people from throughout India and Bhutan. The demand of Indian and Bhutanese consumers from nearby Phuentsholing has led to the development of the service sector in various fields.

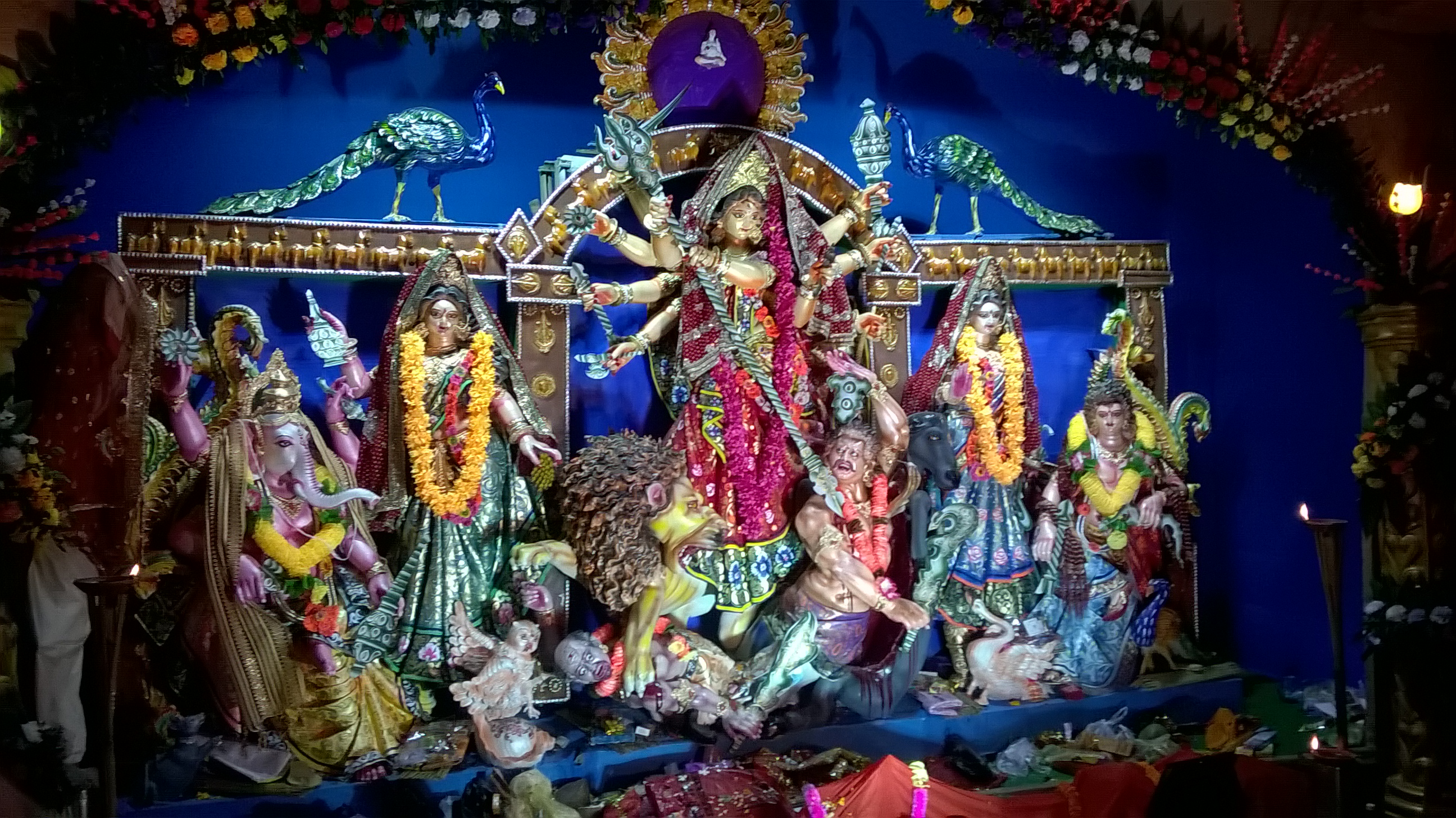
Durga Idol in Jaigaon Puja Pandal

A variety of festivals of various religions are celebrated in Jaigaon, reflecting the town's diverse demographics.

Jaigaon's cultural diversity can be seen in its food and clothing. Various segments of Indian culture are represented, and the town's proximity to Bhutan has influenced locally available commodities. For instance, Tibetan-style cuisine, such as momos are popular, while gho and kira, items of Bhutanese national dress, are produced in Jaigaon for Bhutanese consumers.

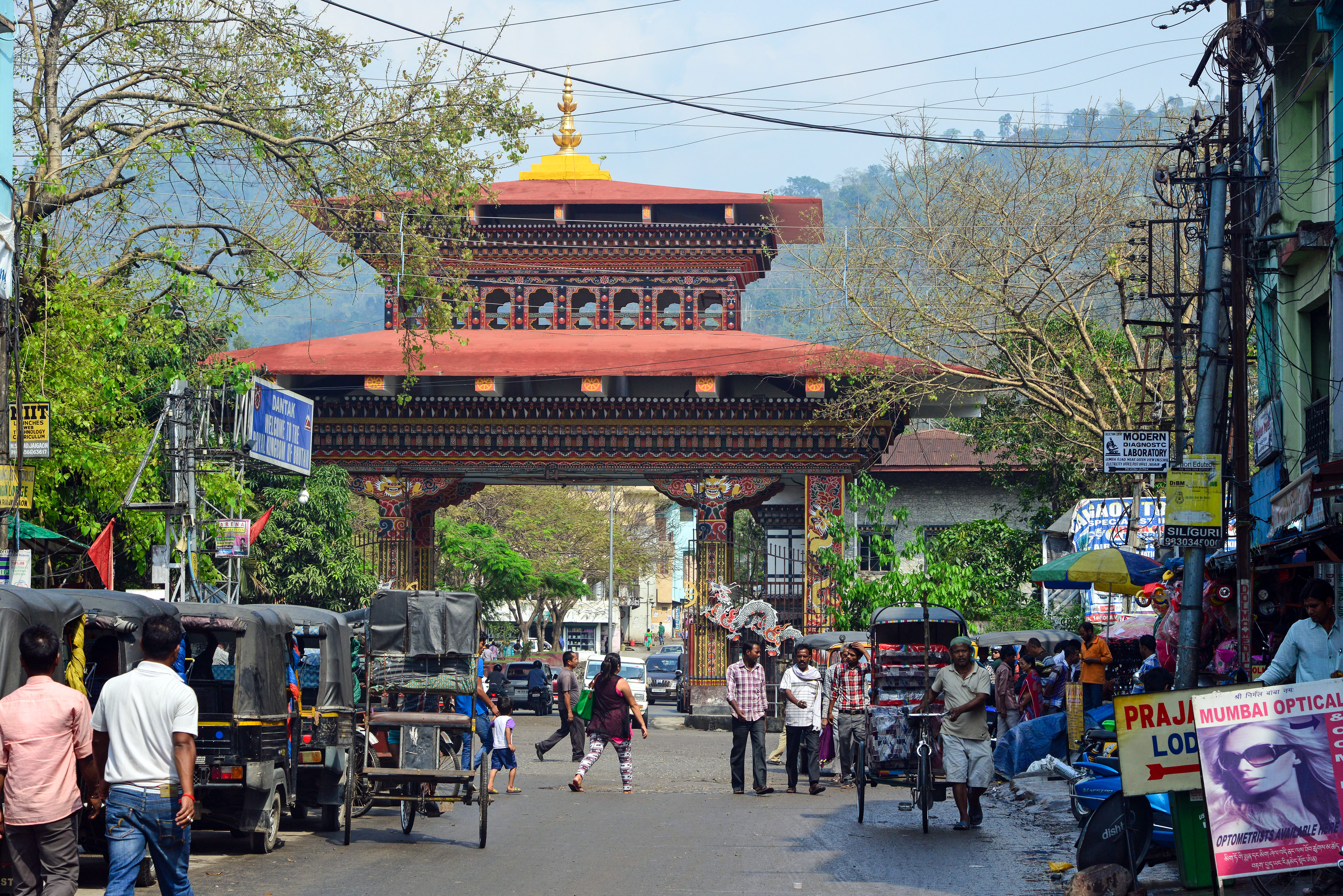
Bhutan gate, Jaigaon on the India-Bhutan border

Every year various sports and other tournaments are organised in Jaigaon by various trusts and NGOs. A cricket tournament is organised every year, and a marathon is organised every January. Apart from these, various inter-school debates, quizzes and sports meets are organised. On Independence Day, students from various schools participate in events organised by the Indian Consulate to Bhutan. Also on Republic Day every year, parades and cultural programs are organised in the town.

== Issues ==
The development of the town has been completely neglected by the state government. Jaigaon lacks a hospital, forcing residents to travel to Cooch Behar, Alipurduar, or Siliguri for medical treatment. Road construction has not been undertaken by the West Bengal government for years. In response, Jaigaon shopkeepers went on strike in the latter half of 2024, but the issue remains unresolved.

Garbage collection is another major problem, with waste often left uncollected for days, leading to unsanitary conditions and health hazards. The town also suffers from severe waterlogging during the monsoon season due to poor drainage systems, exacerbating the already inadequate sewerage infrastructure. Traffic congestion is a growing concern, with narrow roads and a lack of traffic management making daily commutes chaotic.The town has also seen a rise in cases of extortion, particularly targeting businessmen, adding to the already challenging environment.

The town has also seen growing cases of rapes and killings, with repeated failures by the West Bengal Police to apprehend the culprits on time, leading to protests on multiple occasions. Additionally, there is no college in Jaigaon offering science or commerce courses, which forces students to bear the extra burden of pursuing education elsewhere.

The file concerning the development and expansion of Hasimara Air Force Station into domestic airport, which could have greatly benefited Jaigaon, continues to gather dust in the State Government's office and issues pertaining to land acquisition remains unresolved at West Bengal Government's end.

== See also ==
- Bhutan-India Border
- Alipurduar
- Kalchini
