= Bhutan–India border =

International border

Coordinates: 26.89887°N 89.04659°E

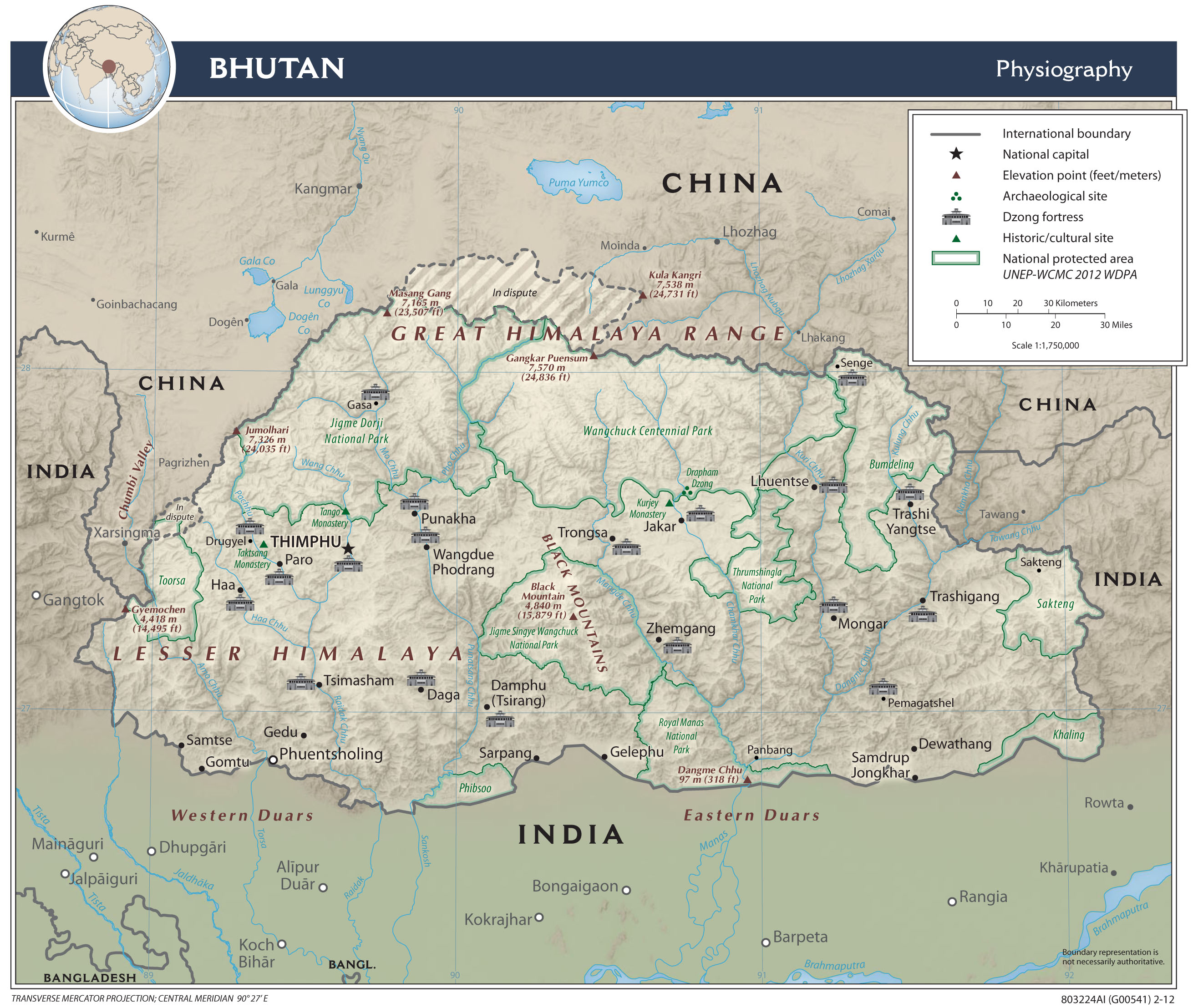
- Map of Bhutan, with India to the south

Characteristics
- Entities: India Bhutan
- Length: 699 km

History
- Established: 11 November 1865; Signing of the Treaty of Sinchula at the end of the Bhutan War
- Current shape: 1973-1984; Further delimitation by Bhutan and India
- Treaties: Treaty of Sinchula

The Bhutan–India border is the open international border separating the Kingdom of Bhutan from the Republic of India. The border is 699 km (434 m) long, and adjoins the Indian states of Assam (267 km; 166 m), Arunachal Pradesh (217 km; 135 m), West Bengal (183 km; 114 m), and Sikkim (32 km; 20 m).

== Description ==
The border starts in the west at the western tripoint with Tibet, China, proceeding from there broadly southwards across Mount Gipmochi and down to the Jaldhaka River. It then utilises this river for a period before turning south-westwards and then east via a series of irregular overland lines that broadly follow the foothills of the Himalayas, notably Dangme Chhu peak. It then turns to the north, turns west near Sakteng, briefly utilising the Tawang Chu and Nyamjang Chu, before turning north up to the eastern Chinese tripoint.

== History ==
Britain had begun conquering India from the 17th century, gradually expanding their rule and creating British India. This brought them into conflict with Bhutan, with Cooch Behar being annexed by Britain in 1770 and a peace treaty signed in 1774 which recognised Bhutan's then borders. Boundary disputes flared up repeatedly in the first half of the 1800s, with Britain annexing the Bengal and Assam Duars in 1841–1842. Continuing tensions led to the Bhutan War of 1860–65; by the subsequent Treaty of Sinchula Bhutan permanently ceded the Bengal and Assam Duars and parts of Dewangiri. Some further modifications to the boundary were made in 1910 via the Treaty of Punakha.

In 1947 India gained independence from Britain, and two years later it signed a treaty with Bhutan by which it recognised the country's sovereignty, though retaining significant influence over its foreign affairs. The boundary was further detailed and refined in the 1973-1984 period through talks between Bhutan and India. Border disputes of a relatively minor nature existed concerning part of the border with Arunachal Pradesh, and the region between Sarbhang and Geylegphug. In 2006 a final border demarcation treaty was signed. A new friendship and cooperation treaty granting Bhutan greater freedom in external matters was signed in 2007.

== Transport and crossings ==
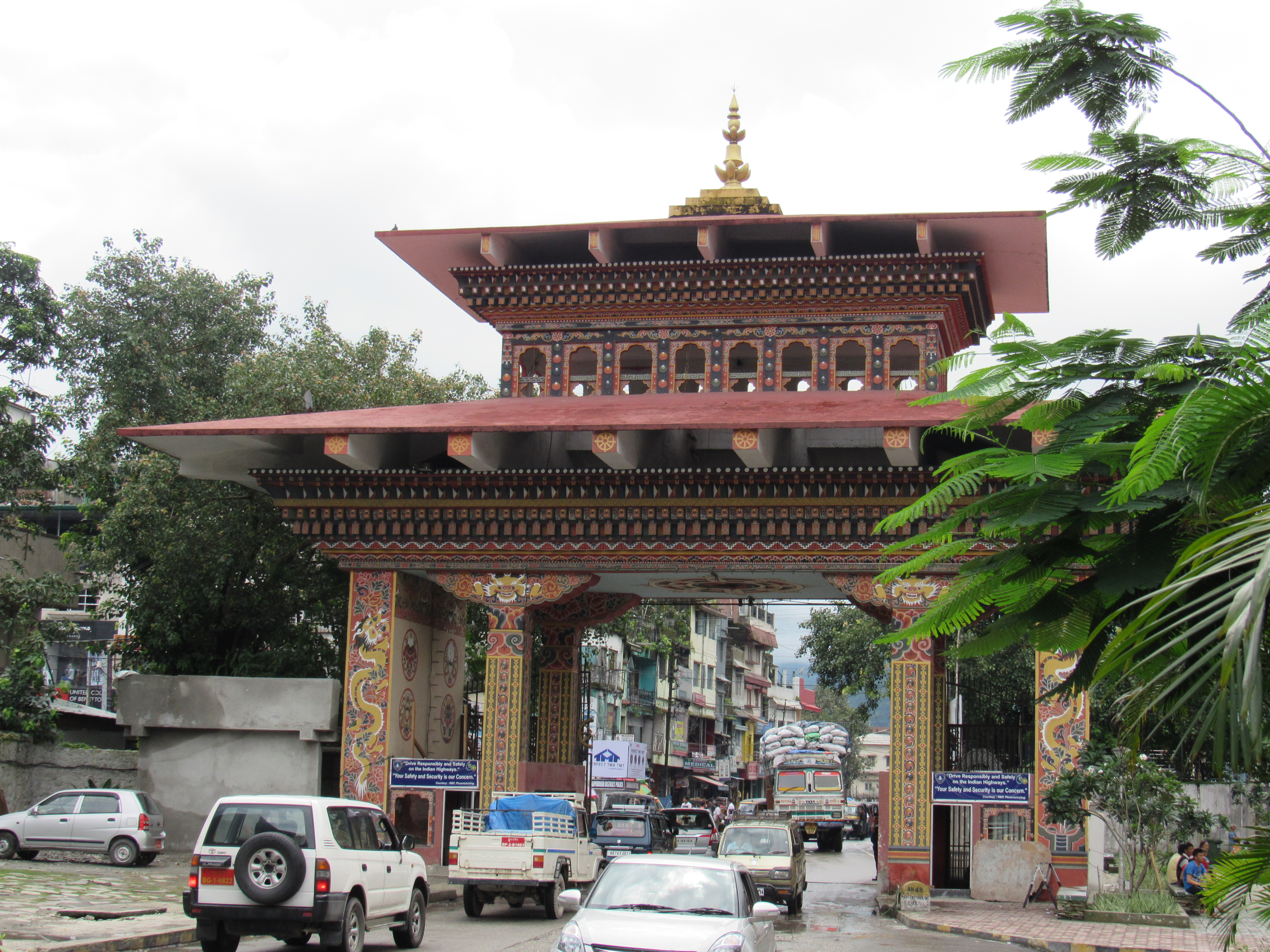
The gate marking the border, view from Phuntsholing, Bhutan

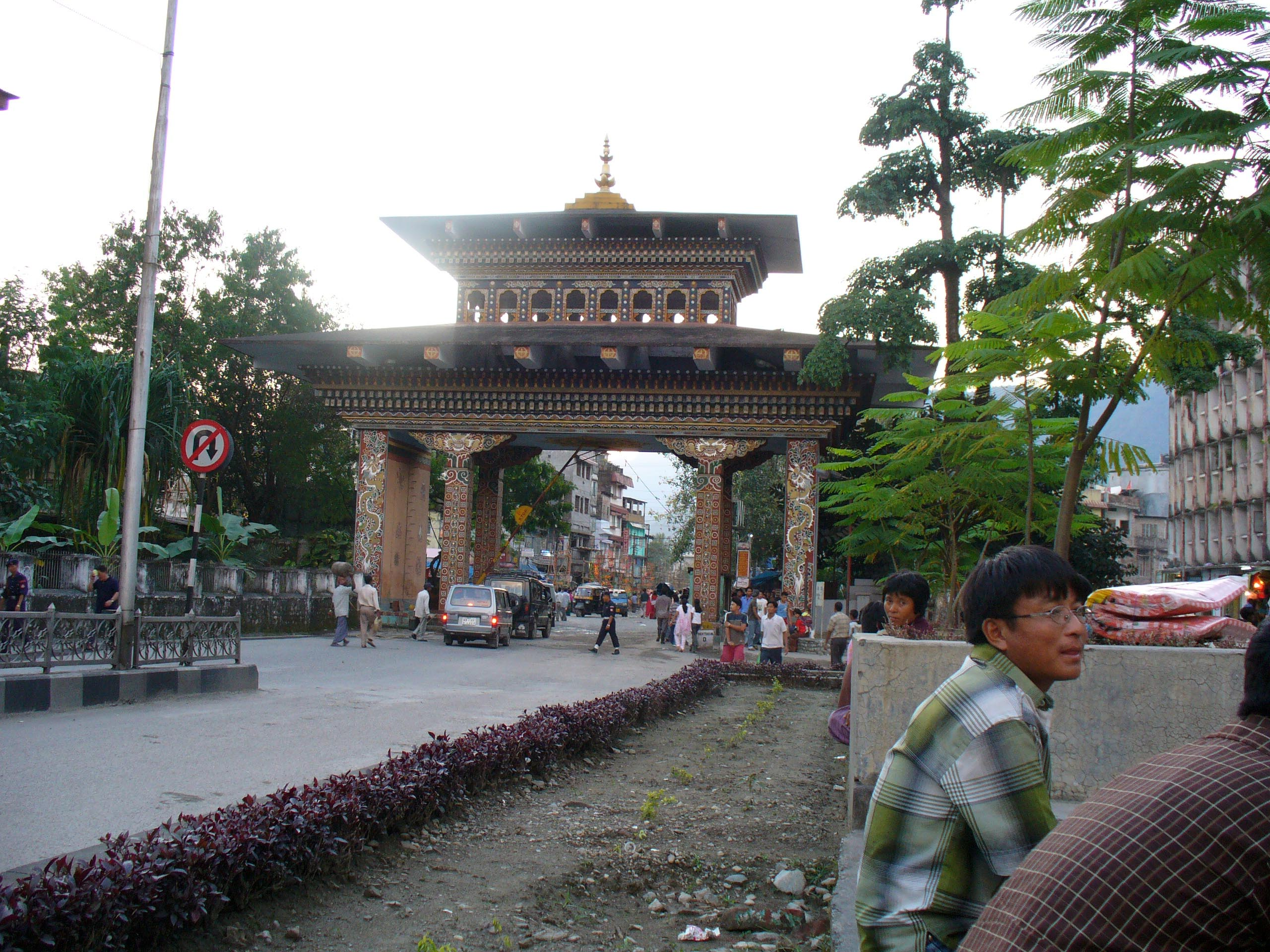
The gate marking the border, view from Phuntsholing, Bhutan

The border between Bhutan and India is the only land access into entering Bhutan, as the border with China is completely closed. As of November 7, 2024 there are two entry points for foreign nationals between Bhutan and India. One is the longstanding one between the towns of Jaigaon, Alipurduar subdivision, Alipurduar District in the Indian state of West Bengal and Phuntsholing, in South West Bhutan. The second is the Darranga Immigration checkpoint between the Eastern border town of Samdrupjongkhar, Bhutan and the state of Assam, India.

== Border protection ==
The Indian government deploys 12 battalions of Sashastra Seema Bal (SSB), and 132 border posts, to guard the border on its side. The bilateral Indian-Bhutan Group Border Management and Security has been established to collaboratively assess and secure the border between the two countries. The Bhutan Army patrols the Bhutanese side.

Following the 2017 China–India border standoff, the Indian government increased the number of border posts.

== See also ==
- Borders of India
- Bhairabkunda
- Jaigaon
- Phuntsholing
- Bhutan–India relations
