= Hasimara Air Force Station =

- IATA: none; ICAO: VEHX

Summary
- Airport type: Military
- Operator: Eastern Air Command
- Serves: Indian Air Force
- Location: Hasimara, West Bengal
- Elevation AMSL: 340 ft (100 m)
- Coordinates: 26°41′53″N 089°22′08″E

Map
- Location within West Bengal Location within India

Runways
Direction	Length		Surface
Direction	m	ft	Surface
11/29	2,743	9,000	Concrete / asphalt
- Source: ourairports.com

Hasimara Air Force Station (ICAO: VEHX) is an Indian Air Force (IAF) base located in Alipurduar district, West Bengal, India. Hasimara is located strategically near the Indo-Bhutan border. It is also the closest Indian air base to the Chumbi Valley - the tri-junction between the Indian state of Sikkim, Bhutan and the Tibet Autonomous Region.

== History ==
The Hashimara AFS was established in the sub-Himalayan region of West Bengal after the Sino-Indian War of 1962. It has completed 50 years of operational existence in April 2013. The station was activated on April 7, 1963, when an IAF Caribou aircraft landed and dropped off its first Station Commander, Wing Commander Douglas George King-Lee. The decision to establish the air base here was taken after the 1962 war. The airbase took active part in the Indo-Pak conflict of 1965 and the Indo-Pak war in 1971.

It was home to No. 22 Squadron IAF in India.

== Facilities ==
The airport is situated at an elevation of 340 ft (104 m) above mean sea level. It has one runway with concrete surfaces: 11R/29L measuring 9,000 by 148 feet (2,743 by 45 m).

== Assets ==
In July 2021, the second squadron of Dassault Rafale fighter jets was inducted into No. 101 Squadron IAF at Hasimara.
