= North Bengal State Transport Corporation =

Transport company in West Bengal, India

- Founded: 1960; 66 years ago
- Headquarters: Paribahan Bhavan, Sagar Dighi West, Coochbehar-736101
- Service area: West Bengal, Assam, Sikkim, Bihar and Jharkhand
- Service type: Bus transport network
- Routes: 459
- Depots: 21
- Fleet: 650+ in service
- Daily ridership: 100,000+
- Annual ridership: 1.2 million+
- Fuel type: Diesel fuel
- Operator: Government of West Bengal
- Chief executive: Partha Pratim Ray (Chairman); Dipankar Piplai (Managing Director)
- Website: nbstc.in

North Bengal State Transport Corporation (NBSTC) is a state government run transport corporation in West Bengal, India. It plies buses mainly in North Bengal but operates services to other parts of West Bengal and neighboring states like Sikkim, Assam, and Bihar. The corporation runs premium long haul buses as well as local buses. It is one of the most favoured bus operators in West Bengal.

== Incidents ==
- In Early October 2021, a NBSTC bus rammed into a standing truck in Murshidabad, killing 3 people and leaving 10 injured. Later the police concluded that the bus driver could not estimate that the truck was motionless and this caused the fatal crash.
- An incident took place in Alipurduar in October 2020, where a car collided with a NBSTC bus leaving 5 dead and 6 injured. As per police reports, both the vehicles were speeding when the accident took place. The car collided with the bus when it was in a sharp turn with high speed.
- A NBSTC bus fell into a deep canal in January 2018 killing 36 people. This incident occurred in Murshidabad. Few survivors claim that it was the driver's fault as he was speaking over his phone while driving.
