= Hasimara =

- Town
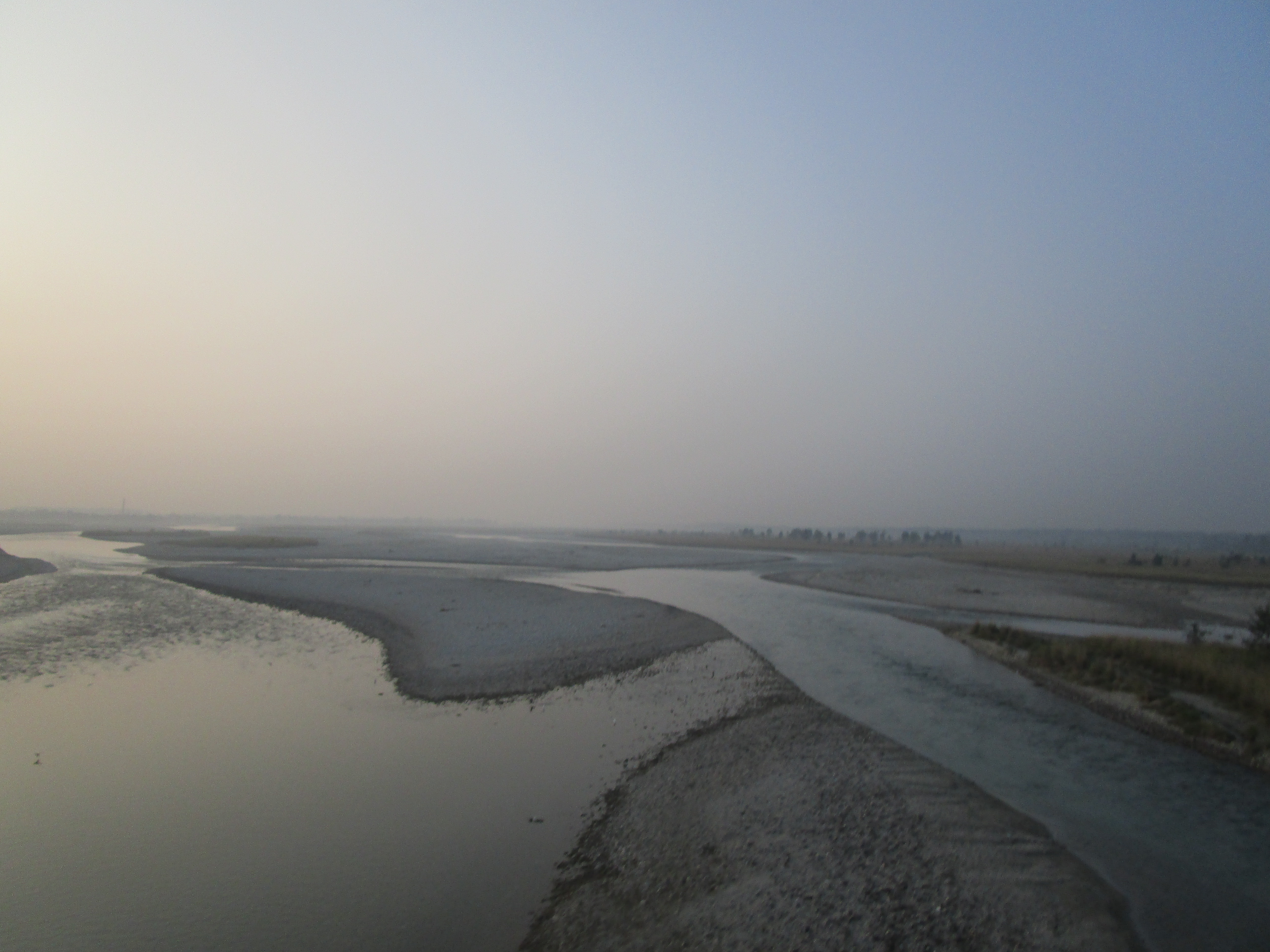
- Torsa River at Hasimara

- Location in West Bengal, India
- Coordinates: 26.75°N 89.35°E
- Country: India
- State: West Bengal
- District: Alipurduar
- Elevation: 109 m (358 ft)

Languages
  - Official: Bengali, English
- Time zone: UTC+5:30 (IST)
- Website: alipurduar.org

Hasimara is a town in Alipurduar district of West Bengal state, India near the border with Bhutan, in the eastern Sivalik Hills. It is located at 26° 45' N latitude and 89° 21' E longitude at an altitude of 109 metres above sea level and has a population of about 40,000 (2001 census).

== Geography ==
Places and tea estates in the eastern portion of Alipurdar subdivision (including Kalchini, Kumargram and Alipuduar II CD blocks) in Alipurduar district
CT: census town, R: rural/ urban centre, N: neighbourhood, A: Air Force Station, NP: national park/ wildlife sanctuary, TE: tea estate, H: historical site
Abbreviations used in names – TG for Tea Garden (town/village), TE for Tea Estate
Owing to space constraints in the small map, the actual locations in a larger map may vary slightly

=== Location ===
The town is located in the central Dooars region of the district and is surrounded by tea gardens. The town also lies on the way to Phuentsholing, the gateway to Bhutan, and the border is just about 17 km away.

Hasimara is located at 26°45′N 89°21′E / 26.75°N 89.35°E / 26.75; 89.35. It has an average elevation of 109 metres (358 feet). Hasimara lies between two rivers running from north to south, draining from the lower Himalayas in Bhutan. Torsa on the west and Basra on the east, both offer picnic spots; though Basra is not frequented on account of a cremation ground next to the road-rail bridge on the west banks of the river. Both rivers are perennial; they don't flood in the monsoon season but can be quite ferocious when in spate. This small hamlet lies at the cross-roads between Alipurduar, Cooch-Behar, Alipurduar, and Phuentsholing (gateway to Bhutan). Phuentsholing is accessed through Jaigaon, the border town. Hamilton-Ganj is another small settlement on the railway line to Alipurduar, about 10 km away, across river Basra. The road traverses through some of the most pristine tropical monsoon forests.

=== Area overview ===
Alipurduar district is covered by two maps. It is an extensive area in the eastern end of the Dooars in West Bengal. It is undulating country, largely forested, with numerous rivers flowing down from the outer ranges of the Himalayas in Bhutan. It is a predominantly rural area with 79.38% of the population living in the rural areas. The district has 1 municipal town and 20 census towns; 20.62% of the population lives in the urban areas. The scheduled castes and scheduled tribes, taken together, form more than half the population in all the six community development blocks in the district. There is a high concentration of tribal people (scheduled tribes) in the three northern blocks of the district.

Note: The map alongside presents some of the notable locations in the subdivision. All places marked in the map are linked in the larger full screen map.

== Transport ==
=== Railway ===
The town is served by the Hasimara Railway Station (Code: HSA) that lies on the New Jalpaiguri–Alipurduar–Samuktala Road line. This railway line was metre gauge and converted to 5 ft 6 in (1,676 mm) broad gauge in 2003.

=== Roadways ===
Frequent taxis and service Jeeps are available from Hasimara to Siliguri, Jaigaon, Birpara, Malbazar, Alipurduar, Jalpaiguri, Mainaguri, Kalimpong, Gangtok, Gorubathan, Dhupguri and Phuntsholing, Bhutan. Bus services are available from the town to P.C. Mittal Memorial Bus Terminus, Siliguri. Apart from it frequent buses connects Hasimara with Alipurduar, Jaigaon, Malbazar, Birpara, Cooch Behar, Jalpaiguri, Falakata, Phuntsholing, Bhutan etc.

== Hasimara Air Force Station ==
Hasimara Air Force Station is an airbase of Indian Air Force where 101 Squadron housing Rafale Fighter Jets is based. The airbase is not open to civilian flights. The nearest civilian airport is Bagdogra Airport just west of Siliguri. (Incidentally Bagdogra is also an airbase of Indian Air Force but IAF allows civilian flights at Bagdogra.)
