= Phuntsholing =

Phuentsholing ཕུན་ཚོགས་གླིང་ Phuentsholing
- Thromde
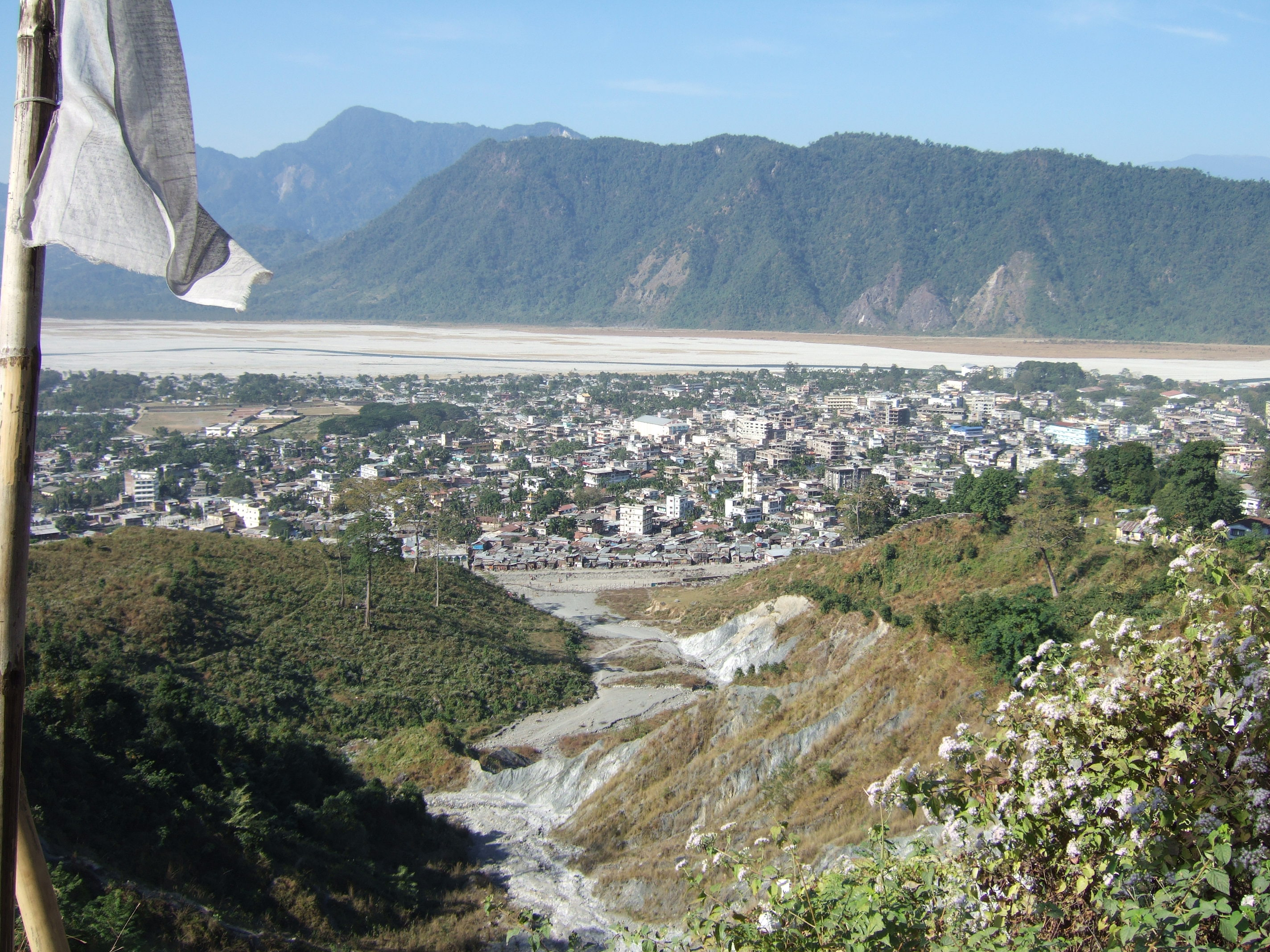
- Phuntsholing, Bhutan

- Location in Bhutan
- Coordinates: 26°51′0″N 89°23′0″E
- Country: Bhutan
- Dzongkhag: Chukha District
- Gewog: Phuentsholing, Sampheling

Area
  - Total: 15.6 km^{2} (6.0 sq mi)
- Elevation: 293 m (961 ft)

Population (2017)
  - Total: 27,658
- Time zone: UTC+6 (BTT)
- Website: pcc.bt

Phuntsholing, also spelled as Phuentsholing (Dzongkha: ཕུན་ཚོགས་གླིང་), is a border town in southern Bhutan and is the administrative seat of Chukha District. The town occupies parts of both Phuentsholing Gewog and Sampheling Gewog.

Phuentsholing adjoins the Indian town of Jaigaon, and cross-border trade has resulted in a thriving local economy. The town previously hosted the headquarters of the Bank of Bhutan before they were shifted to Thimphu. In 2017, Phuentsholing had a population of 27,658.

== History ==
On 5 April 1964, reformist Prime Minister Jigme Dorji was assassinated in Phuntsholing by monarchist cadres as the king lay ill in Switzerland. The Dorji family was subsequently put under close watch. It was 1958 when the first one-storeyed cottage was constructed to house a shop. The late Prime Minister, Jigme Dorji informed Phuentsholing residents that concrete houses could be constructed. Tashi group of companies constructed the first concrete house, followed by Tibetans and Indians. Some of the structures that exist to this day are the buildings housing Bhutan Enterprise, Jatan Prasad Lal Chand Prasad shop and a beauty parlour near Zantdopelri lhakhang. After the announcement, 18 shops were built around Zangdopelri area. The Zangdopelri area was a bus terminal, and on Saturday a market would be assembled. Apart from the cottages, there were several huts and Phuentsholing was beginning to grow.

== Geography ==
=== Climate ===
Phuntsholing has a sultry tropical monsoon climate, strongly influenced by the South Asian monsoon. It has an average annual precipitation of 3,953 millimetres (155.6 in). Summers are long, muggy and very rainy, while winters are short, very mild and dry. This climate is described by the Köppen climate classification as Am. On 27 August 1997, Phuntsholing recorded the highest temperature ever in Bhutan, at 40 °C (104 °F).

Climate data for Phuntsholing (1996–2017)
Month	Jan	Feb	Mar	Apr	May	Jun	Jul	Aug	Sep	Oct	Nov	Dec	Year
Record high °C (°F)	33.0 (91.4)	33.8 (92.8)	38.0 (100.4)	37.0 (98.6)	39.0 (102.2)	38.0 (100.4)	39.0 (102.2)	40.0 (104.0)	39.0 (102.2)	38.0 (100.4)	36.9 (98.4)	35.0 (95.0)	40.0 (104.0)
Mean daily maximum °C (°F)	23.9 (75.0)	26.6 (79.9)	29.8 (85.6)	31.1 (88.0)	32.3 (90.1)	32.3 (90.1)	31.9 (89.4)	32.3 (90.1)	31.7 (89.1)	31.2 (88.2)	28.7 (83.7)	25.4 (77.7)	29.8 (85.6)
Daily mean °C (°F)	18.6 (65.5)	21.5 (70.7)	24.2 (75.6)	25.6 (78.1)	27.0 (80.6)	27.7 (81.9)	27.8 (82.0)	28.1 (82.6)	27.4 (81.3)	26.2 (79.2)	23.3 (73.9)	20.2 (68.4)	24.8 (76.6)
Mean daily minimum °C (°F)	13.4 (56.1)	16.3 (61.3)	18.5 (65.3)	20.1 (68.2)	21.7 (71.1)	23.1 (73.6)	23.7 (74.7)	23.8 (74.8)	23.1 (73.6)	21.1 (70.0)	17.9 (64.2)	15.0 (59.0)	19.8 (67.7)
Record low °C (°F)	5.0 (41.0)	9.0 (48.2)	12.0 (53.6)	14.3 (57.7)	15.1 (59.2)	16.0 (60.8)	17.0 (62.6)	19.0 (66.2)	17.0 (62.6)	14.0 (57.2)	10.0 (50.0)	7.5 (45.5)	5.0 (41.0)
Average rainfall mm (inches)	17.3 (0.68)	31.1 (1.22)	80.2 (3.16)	216.5 (8.52)	380.3 (14.97)	807.2 (31.78)	962.6 (37.90)	779.1 (30.67)	492.6 (19.39)	162.9 (6.41)	13.2 (0.52)	10.4 (0.41)	3,953.4 (155.63)
Average relative humidity (%)	72.4	71.3	70.0	74.7	80.1	83.8	88.5	87.1	84.4	75.6	70.7	72.4	77.6
Source: National Center for Hydrology and Meteorology

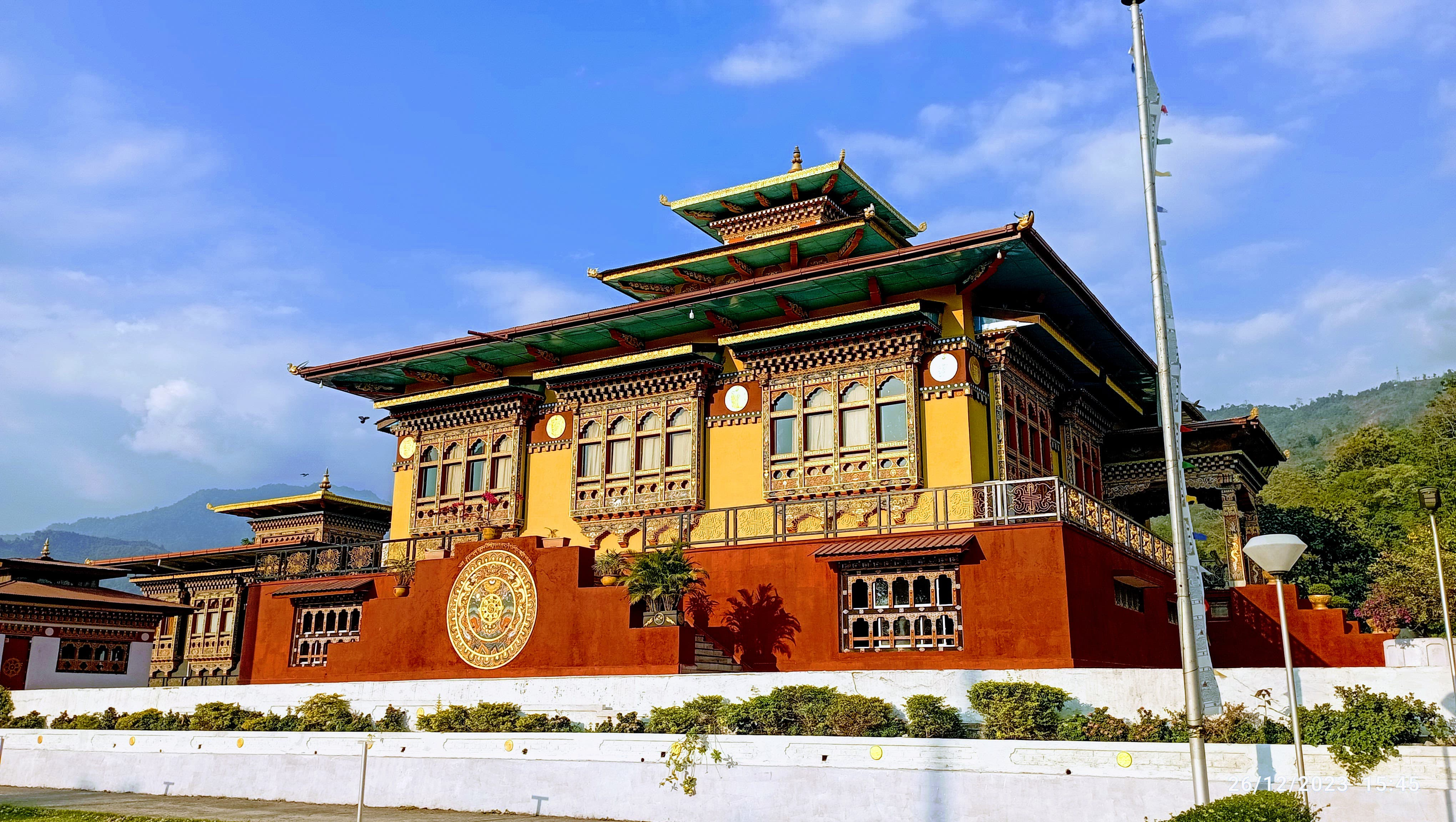
Palden Tashi Chholing Shedra

== Architecture and culture ==
The India-Bhutan border separates two different urban areas. Jaigaon across the border is larger, bustling and loud, similar to many other West Bengal centres of commerce, albeit with many Bhutanese shoppers. Phuntsholing is uniquely more urban than other Bhutanese towns as it is the Bhutan financial, industrial and trading capital. It is more orderly than its neighbour.

== Economy ==
The majority of goods traded into Bhutan transit through Phuntsholing, making the town the gateway to Bhutan for trade with India. The border with China is closed.

== Indian border crossing ==
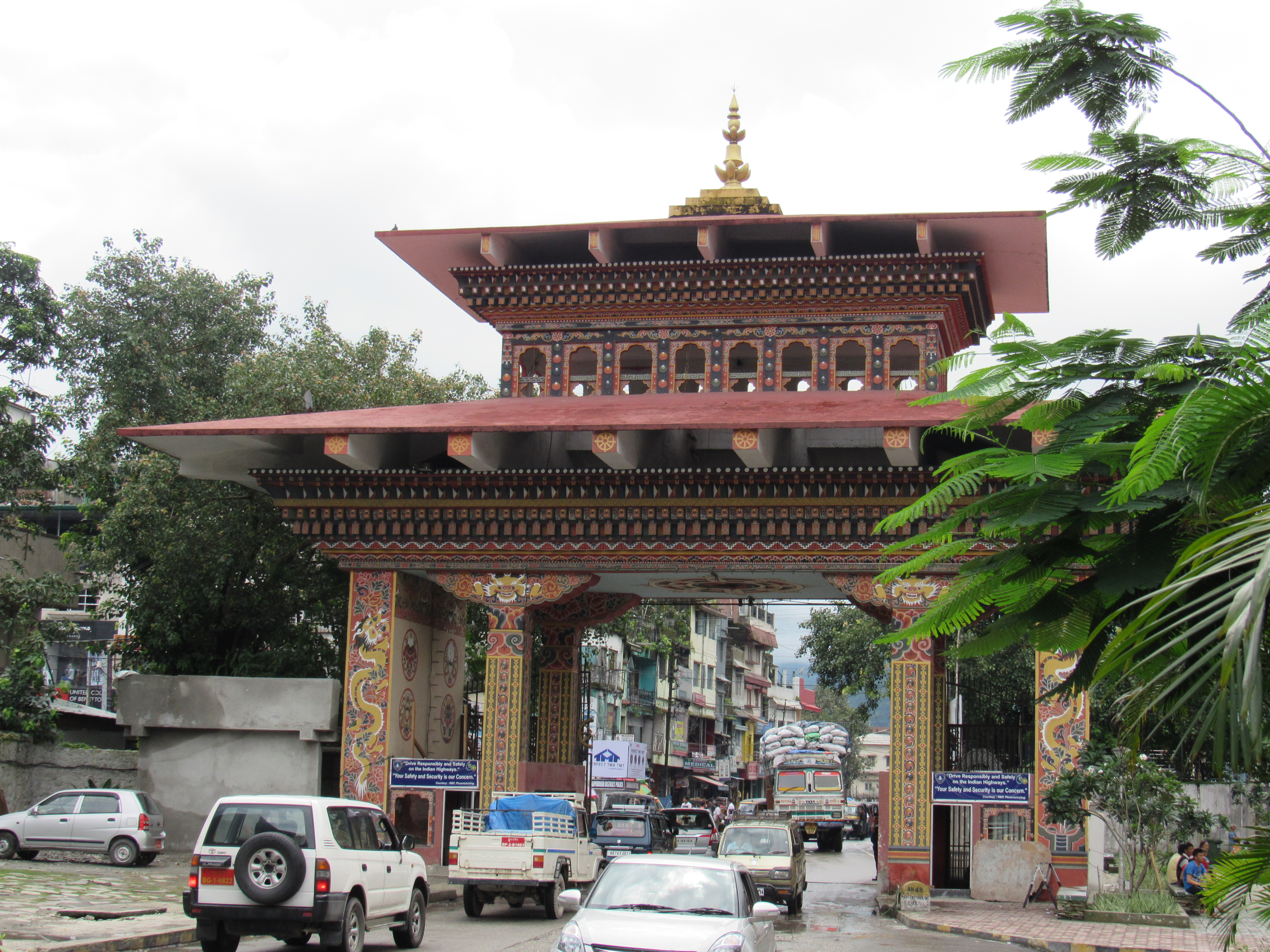
The ornate border gate between Bhutan and India, seen from Bhutan

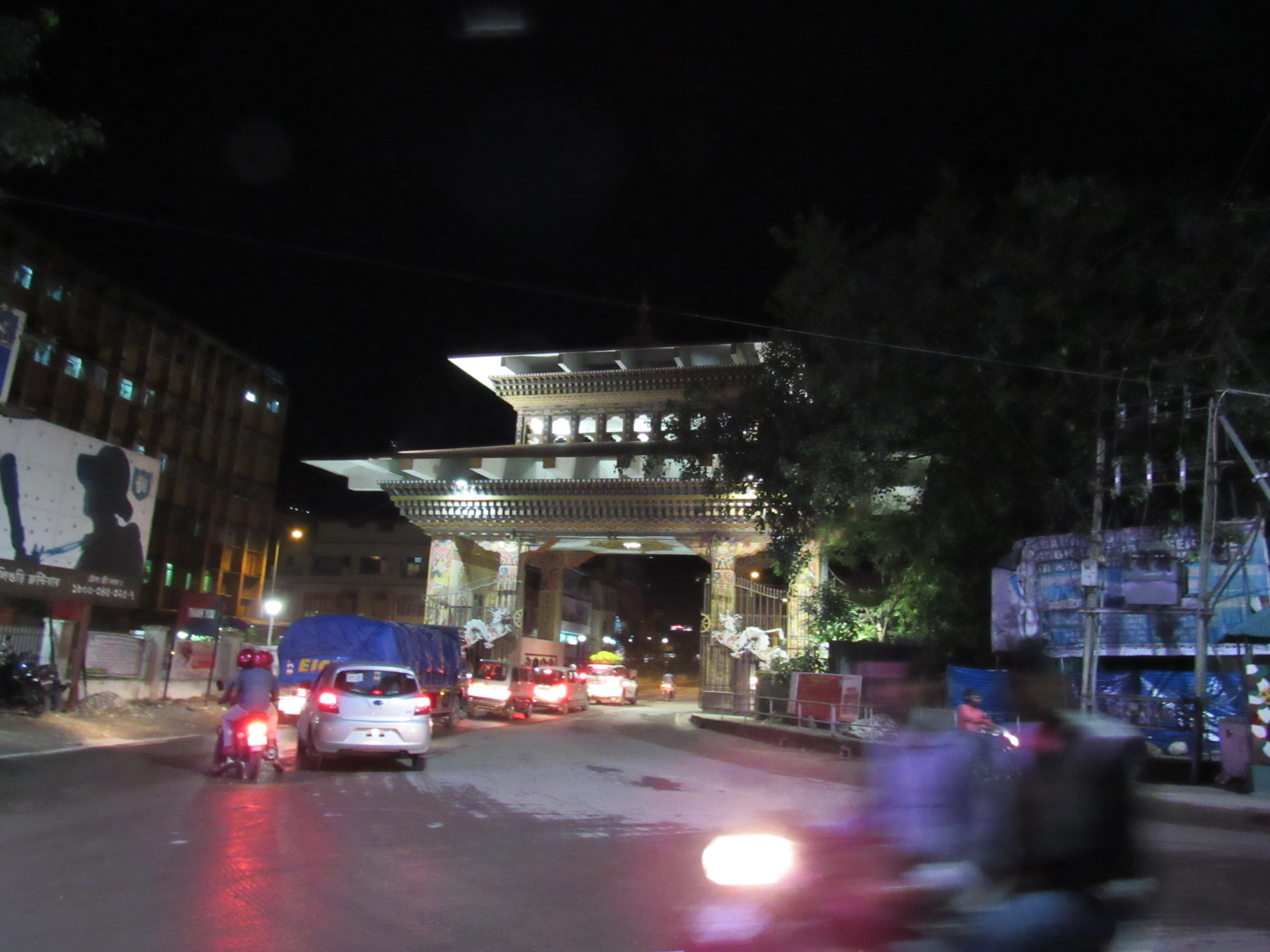
Bhutan India border seen from Jaigaon, India

The border is separated by a long wall with a single Bhutanese gate. Locals can sometimes even cross without being asked for papers. Tourists from India, Bangladesh and Maldives do not need visa to enter Bhutan but have to show proof of identity such as a passport or voter ID card and apply for a permit at Phuntsholing to enter Bhutan. Other foreigners need a visa presented by a hired registered tour guide. The entry gate into the town is staffed by the Sashastra Seema Bal and Bhutanese Army guards. The terrain inclines soon after the gate.

== Transportation ==
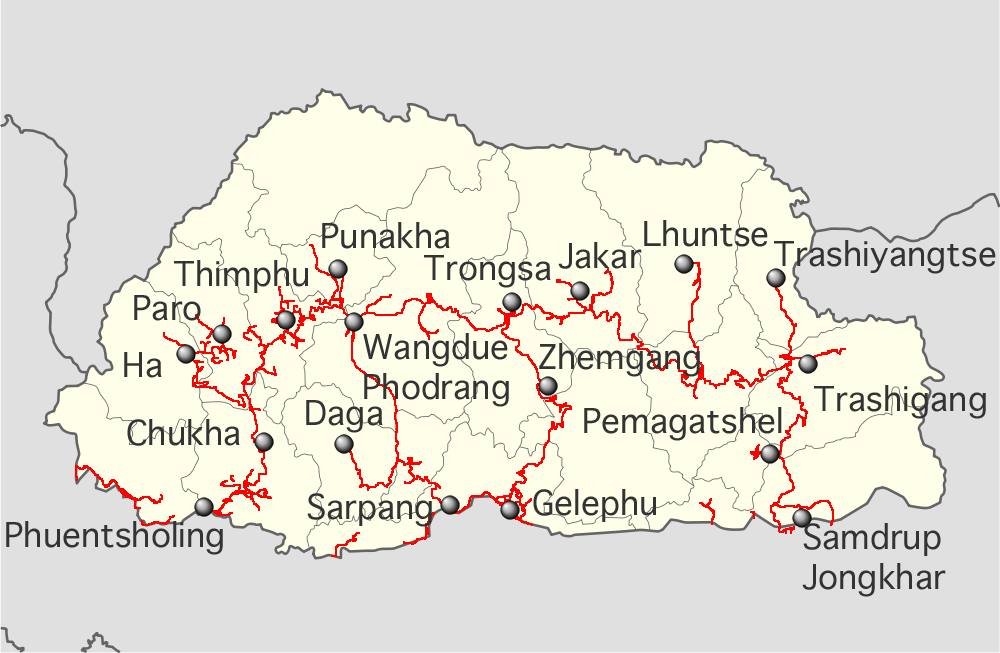
Highways of Bhutan

The town is connected to the rest of the major cities via national highway. The town does not have airport facilities or a railway but Indian Railways has railway stations nearby. A 20 km (12 mi) railway track has been planned from the nearest railway stone Hasimara in North Bengal to Phuntsholing.

Siliguri is the nearest large city in India. New Jalpaiguri and New Alipurduar are the nearest large railway junctions. Buses are available from the towns in North Bengal. Buses are operated by both Indian based companies and Bhutanese government. Once at Phuntsholing, the Lateral Road gives travelers access to the rest of Bhutan.

From almost anywhere in the city, one can see the road to Thimphu snaking up the hillside, and in the evening it is easy to see the headlights of distant vehicles heading towards the capital. Opposite the big ground PSA is the road that connects the rest of the cities of Bhutan. The Lateral Road, Bhutan's main highway, begins in Phuntsholing and winds some 636 kilometres (395 mi) to Trashigang in the east.

== See also ==
- Tourism in Bhutan
- Transport in Bhutan
- Bhutan-India Border
- Püncogling Township
