= Prestage =

Prestage is a surname. Notable people with the surname include:

- Edgar Prestage, British historian
- Franklin Prestage, British railway engineer
- Grady Prestage, American politician and civil engineer
- Jewel Prestage, American political scientist, activist, and author
- John Prestage, American physicist
