= Ghum railway station =

Railway station in India

Ghoom railway station
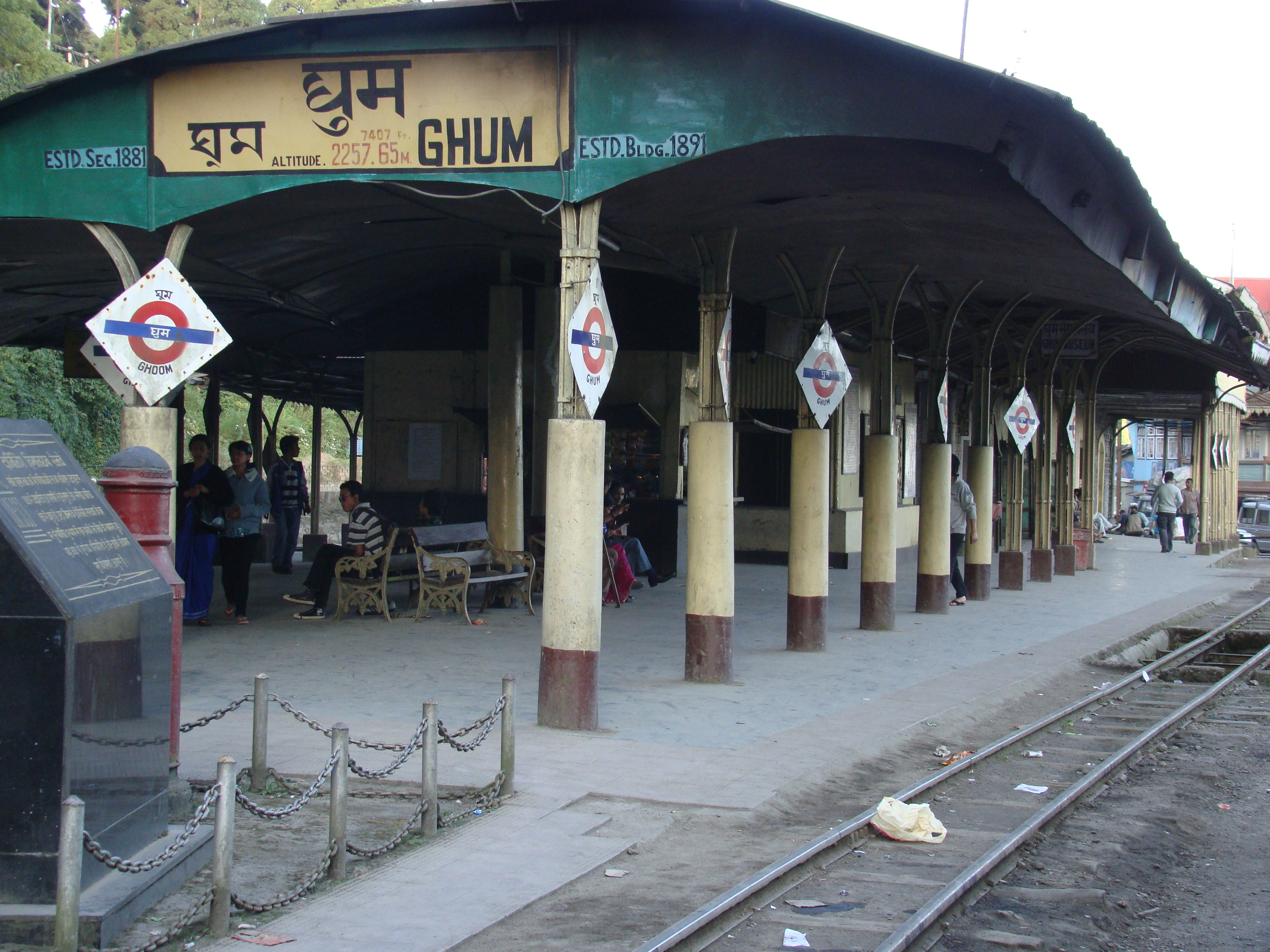
- Ghum railway station platform in 2009

General information
- Location: Hill Cart Road, Ghoom, Darjeeling West Bengal; India
- Coordinates: 27.0077589°N 88.253708°E
- Line: Darjeeling Himalayan Railway
- Platforms: 2

Other information
- Station code: GHUM
- Website: http://dhr.in.net/

History
- Opened: 4 April 1881
Location
- Location within India Location within West Bengal

Ghum railway station of the Darjeeling Himalayan Railway is situated at an altitude of 2,260 metres (7,410 ft). The place is the home of the Ghum Monastery and the Batasia Loop, a bend of the Darjeeling Himalayan Railway.

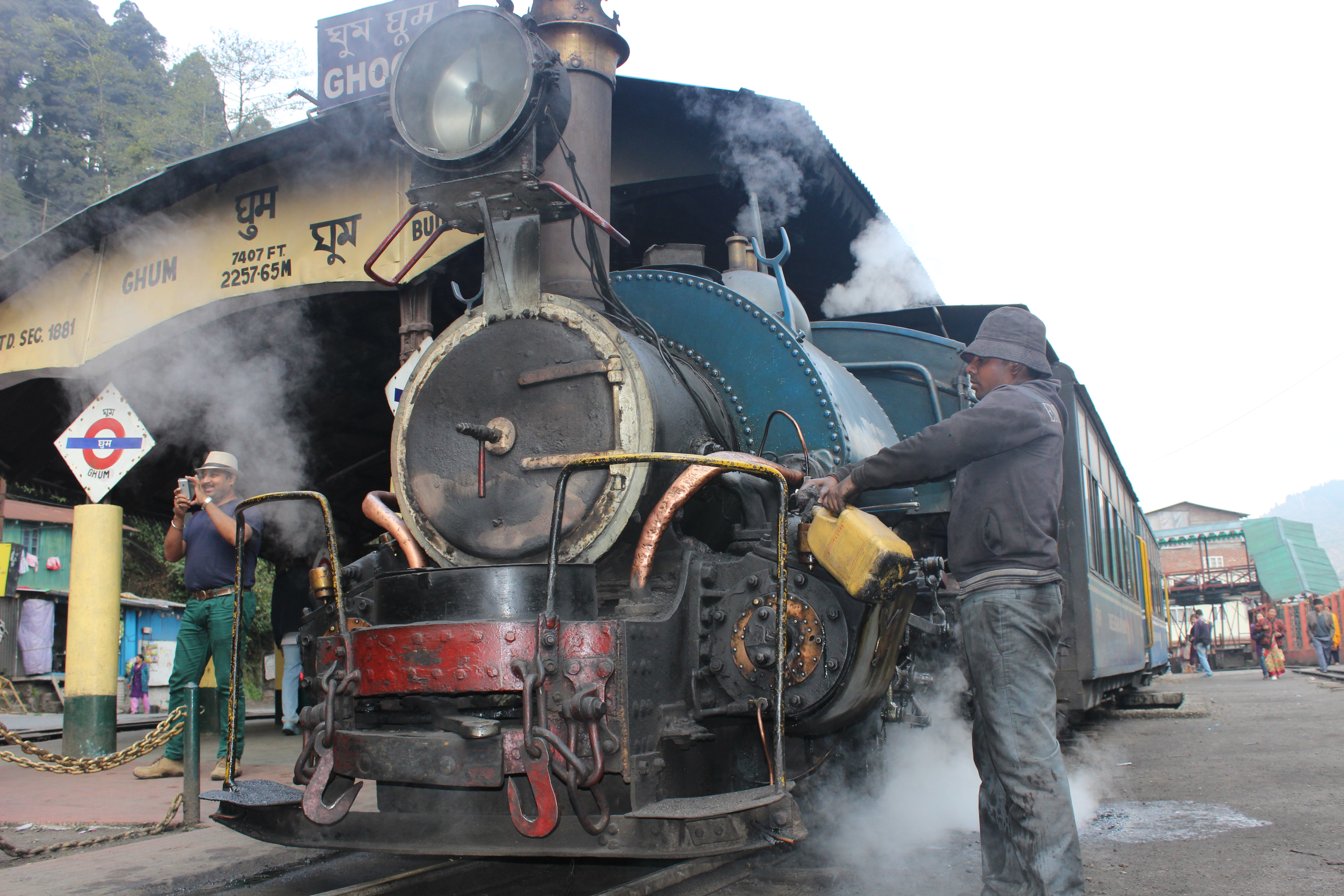
Himalayan Bird

Construction of the Darjeeling Himalayan Railway started in 1879 and the railway track reached Ghum on 4 April 1881. Until 1878, the journey from Kolkata to Darjeeling took 5–6 days — using steam-engine-pulled trains, crossing the Ganges by steam ferry at Sahebganj, and then using bullock carts and palanquins. In 1878, Siliguri was put on the railway map of India, cutting down the journey to two days. In 2007, the train journey from Kolkata to New Jalpaiguri (a new railway station 6 km, 3.7 mi from Siliguri) takes about 10 hours. Thereafter it is 3–4 hours to Ghum or Darjeeling by road or 6–7 hours by the Darjeeling Himalayan Railway. Those who are not eager to travel all the way from New Jalpaiguri to Darjeeling by the slow train climbing up the hill can enjoy a ride on the tourist train from Darjeeling to Ghum and back.

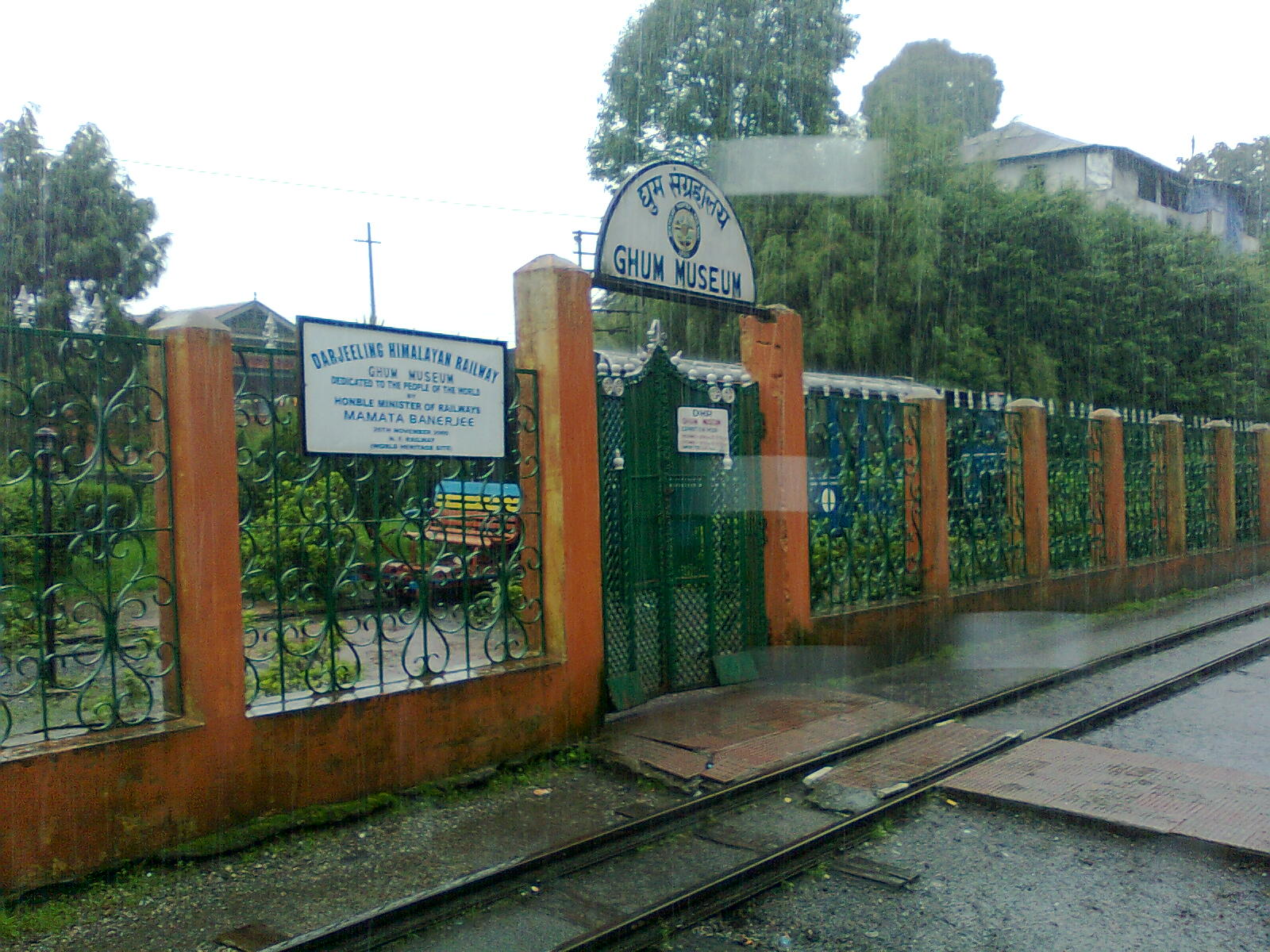
Rail Museum, Ghum

After climbing from Siliguri to Ghum, the train starts descending about 1,000 ft (300 m) to Darjeeling, first crossing the graceful double loop at Batasia (meaning windy place).

Ghum is (falsely) claimed by some tourist literature to be the highest railway station in the world. It never was. Chicla station at 3,724 m (12,218 ft) in Peru opened in 1878. The Tanggula railway station on the Qingzang railway in China and Tibet, opened in 2006, is at 5,068 m (16,627 feet). In Switzerland, the Jungfraubahn (JB) is a 1,000 mm (3 ft 3 3/8 in) rack railway which runs 9 kilometres (5.6 mi) from Kleine Scheidegg to the highest railway station in Europe at Jungfraujoch (elevation 3,471 m, 11,388 ft).

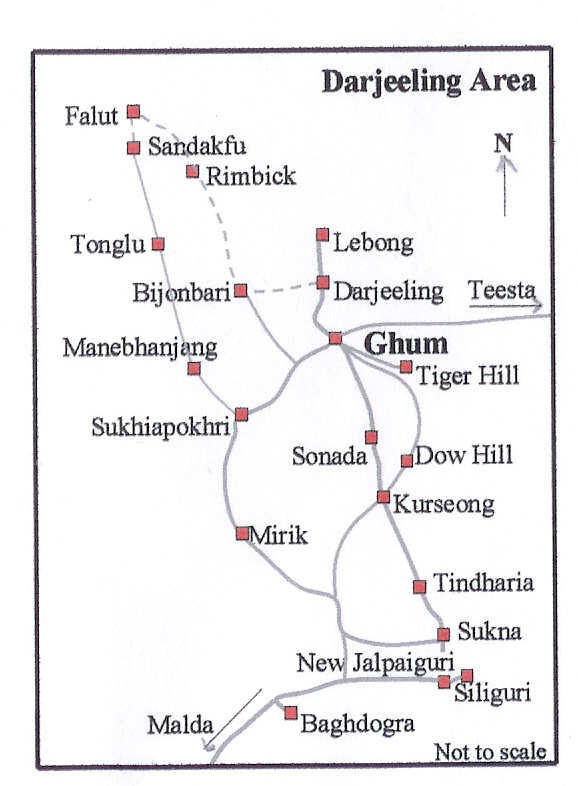
