= Darjeeling Himalayan Railway =

Narrow gauge mountain railway in north India

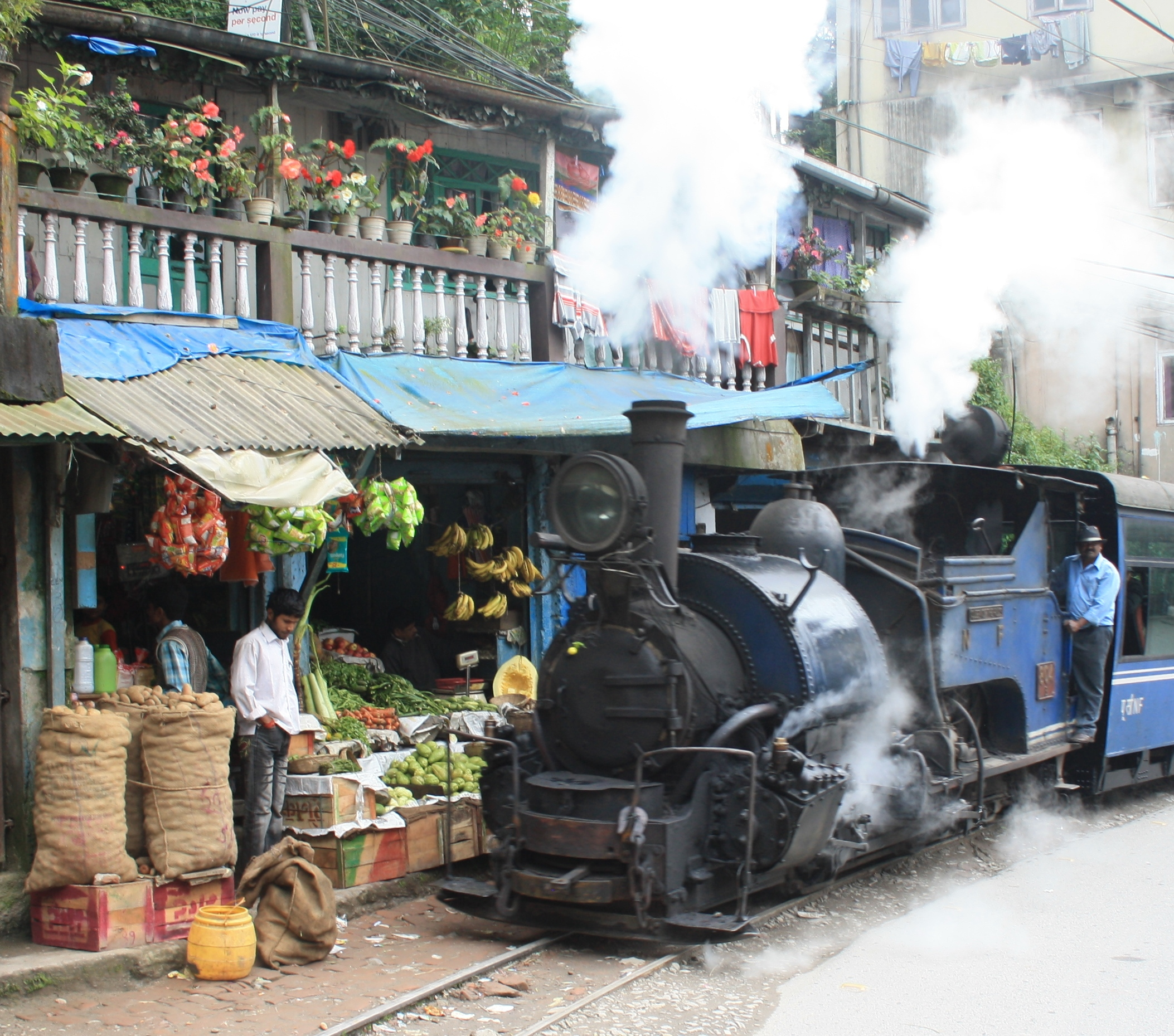
- Passing a fruit shop in Darjeeling
- Terminus: Darjeeling

Commercial operations
- Built by: Franklin Prestage
- Original gauge: 610 mm (2 ft)

Preserved operations
- Owned by: Indian Railways
- Operated by: Northeast Frontier Railway
- Stations: 17
- Length: 83.9 km (52.1 mi)

Commercial history
- Opened: 1881; 145 years ago

Preservation history
- Headquarters: Elysia Place, Kurseong

Website
- dhr.in.net
- Location within India

UNESCO World Heritage Site
- Part of: Mountain Railways of India
- Criteria: Cultural: (ii)(iv)
- Reference: 113645
- Inscription: 1999 (23rd Session)
- Extensions: 2005, 2008
- Area: 5.34 ha (13.2 acres)
- Buffer zone: 70 ha (170 acres)
- Coordinates: 26°41′2″N 88°26′38″E
Route map
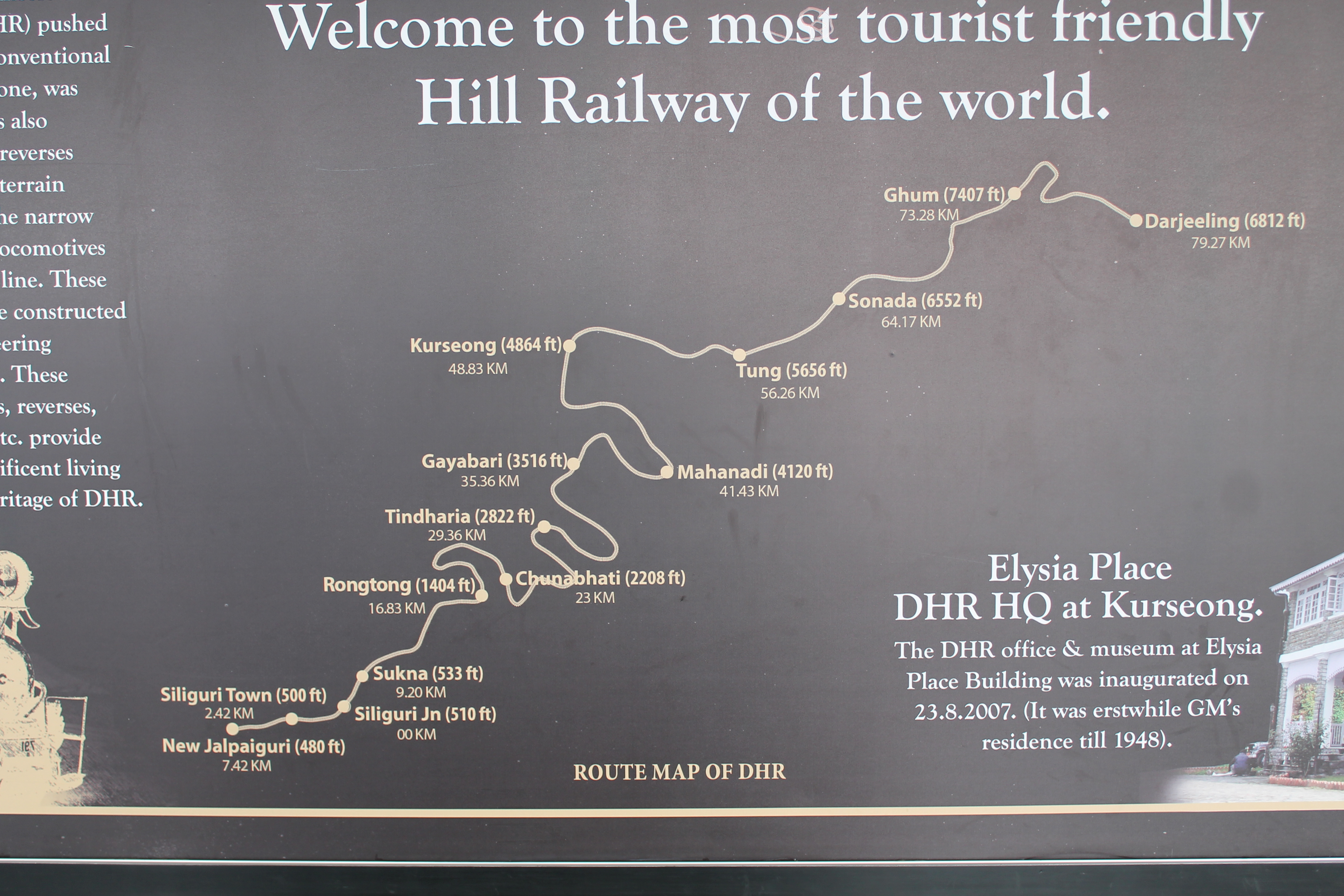

The Darjeeling Himalayan Railway, also known as the DHR, is a 610 mm (2 ft) gauge railway that runs between New Jalpaiguri and Darjeeling in the Indian state of West Bengal. Built between 1879 and 1881, it is about 88 km (55 mi) long. It climbs from about 100 m (330 ft) above sea level at New Jalpaiguri to about 2,200 m (7,200 ft) at Darjeeling, using six zig zags and three loops (originally five) to gain altitude. Ghum station is situated at an altitude of 2,260 metres (7,410 ft). Six diesel locomotives handle most of the scheduled service, with daily tourist trains from Darjeeling to Ghum – India's highest railway station – and the steam-hauled Red Panda service from Darjeeling to Kurseong. Steam-enthusiast specials are hauled by vintage British-built B-Class steam locomotives. The railway's headquarters are at Kurseong.

On 5 December 1999, UNESCO declared the DHR a World Heritage Site. Two more railway lines were later added, and the site became known as one of the mountain railways of India.

== History ==
Siliguri, at the base of the Himalayas, was connected with Calcutta (now Kolkata) by a metre gauge railway in 1878. Between Siliguri and Darjeeling, Tanga services ran on a cart road – the present-day Hill Cart Road. Franklin Prestage, an agent of the Eastern Bengal Railway, approached the government with a proposal to lay a steam tramway from Siliguri to Darjeeling. Ashley Eden, lieutenant governor of Bengal, formed a committee to assess the project's feasibility. The proposal was accepted in 1879 after a positive report by the committee, and construction began that year.

Gillanders, Arbuthnot and Company was hired to construct the line and, by March 1880, track was laid as far as Tindharia, and Lord Lytton, the first viceroy to visit Darjeeling, rode to Tindharia on the train. Colonel F.S. Taylor, R.E., Consulting Engineer to the Government of India for Guaranteed Railways, and Franklin Prestage inspected the line and authorised the stretch from Siliguri to Kurseong open for traffic from 16 August 1880. It opened a few days later on 23 August 1880. The stretch from Siliguri to Darjeeling opened on 4 July 1881. The company's name was changed to Darjeeling Himalayan Railway Company.

Although the railway originally followed Hill Cart Road, the steepness of the road was more than the locomotives could handle in some areas. In 1882, four loops and four zig-zags were built between Sukna and Gayabari to ease the gradient to a uniform 1 in 28. The line was extended by a quarter-mile to Darjeeling Bazar in 1886. The Darjeeling station was renovated in 1891 and Kurseong got a new station building and storage shed in 1896, but the railway was affected by an 1897 earthquake and a major cyclone in 1899. In 1902, heavy rains caused many landslips along the route and the Teesta bridge was washed away. Services were maintained with transhipments at the breaks.

In 1910, the DHR carried 174,000 passengers and 47,000 tons of goods. The first bogie carriages entered service, replacing basic four-wheel carriages. DHR extension lines were built to Kishanganj in 1914 and Gielkhola in 1915. At Tindharia, the railway works were relocated from behind the locomotive shed to a larger site.

The Batasia Loop was constructed in 1919, creating easier gradients on the ascent from Darjeeling. The DHR began facing competition from buses operating on the Hill Cart Road which took less time than the railway to reach Darjeeling. In 1934, a major earthquake in Bihar shook all of Northeast India. Many buildings in Darjeeling were heavily damaged and the railway was also affected, although it soon recovered and played a vital role in transporting repair materials. During World War II, the DHR transported military personnel and supplies to the camps around Ghum and Darjeeling.

In 1951, the railway was purchased by the Indian government and absorbed into the government railway organisation before it was managed by the Assam Railway. Assam Railway (including the DHR) became part of the North Eastern Railway zone in 1952, and part of Indian Railways' Northeast Frontier Railway zone six years later. In 1962, the railway was realigned at Siliguri and extended by nearly 6 km (3.7 mi) to New Jalpaiguri (NJP) to meet the new broad-gauge line there. The extension began freight service that year, and passenger service in 1964. The locomotive shed and carriage depot at Siliguri Junction were moved to NJP.

The railway was closed for 18 months during the Gorkhaland hostilities in 1988 and 1989. It was declared a World Heritage Site by UNESCO in 1999.

Following the COVID-19 pandemic in the country, the service was stopped for 18 months from March 2020 to August 2021. On 25 August 2021, the service was restarted from New Jalpaiguri to Darjeeling with the new vistadome coaches for the tourists.

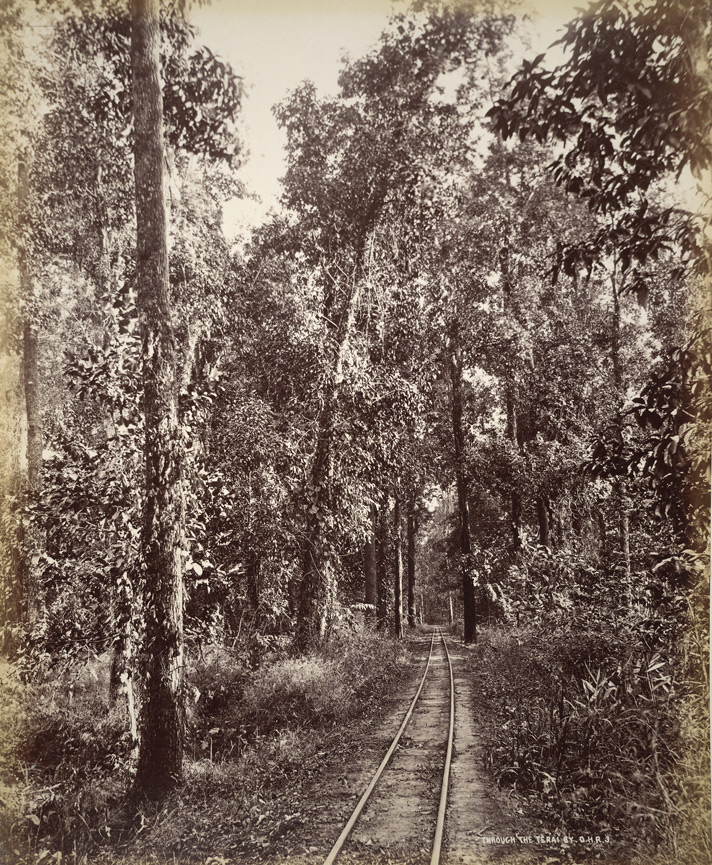
1880 line through the Terai

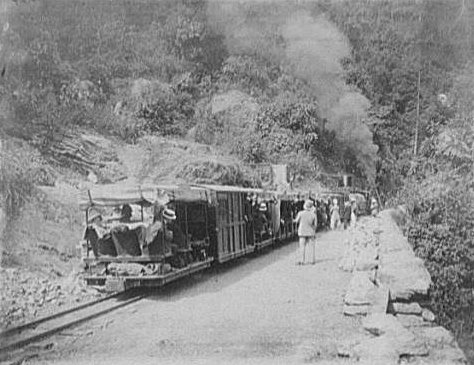
The railway in 1895

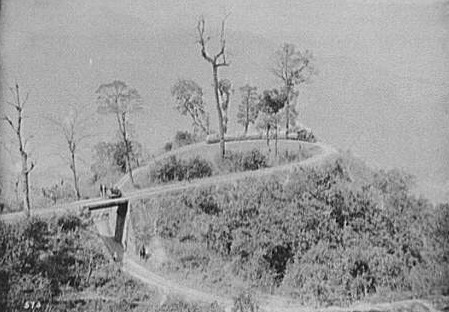
The Choonbatty loop in 1895

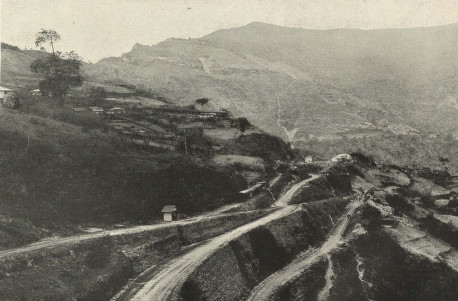
Darjeeling reversing station around 1905

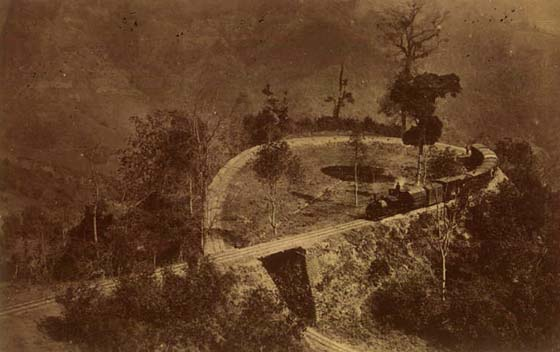
The Agony Point loop in 1921

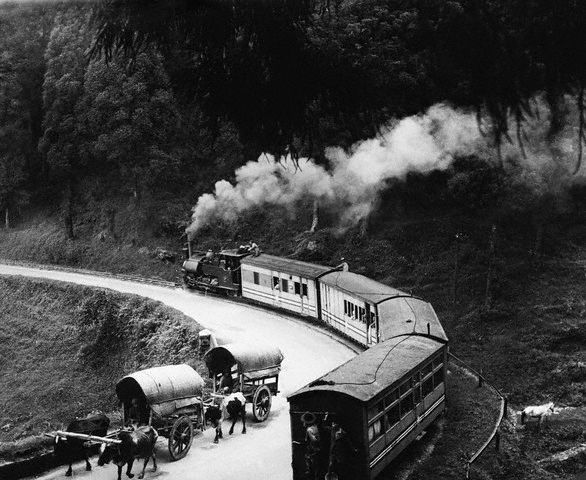
1930s train

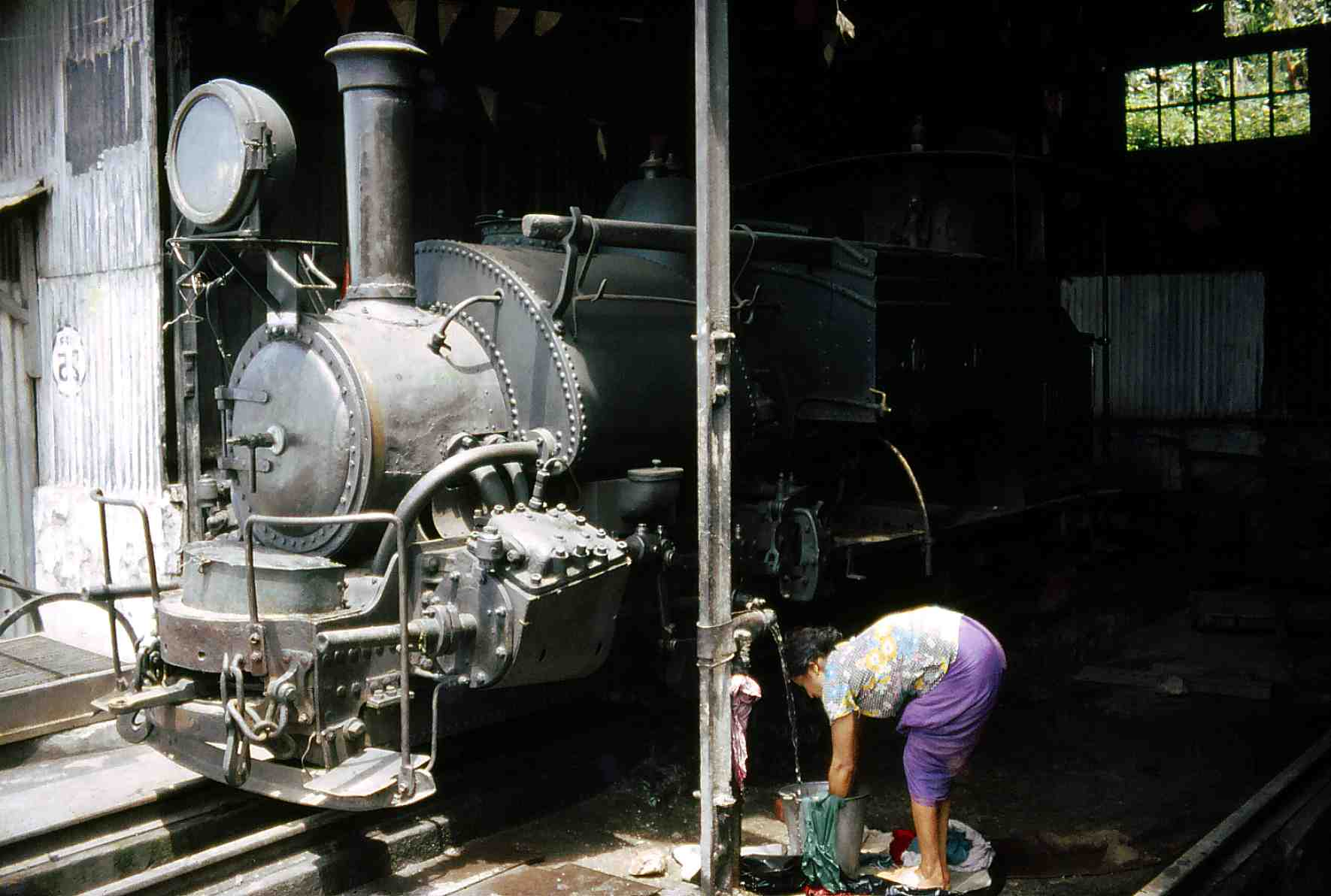
Locomove in shed, 1979

== Operators ==
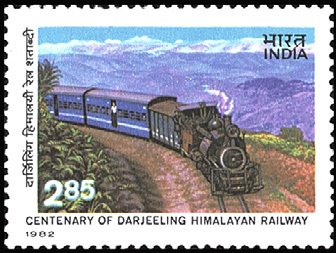
Centenary of Darjeeling Himalayan Railway postage stamp, 1982

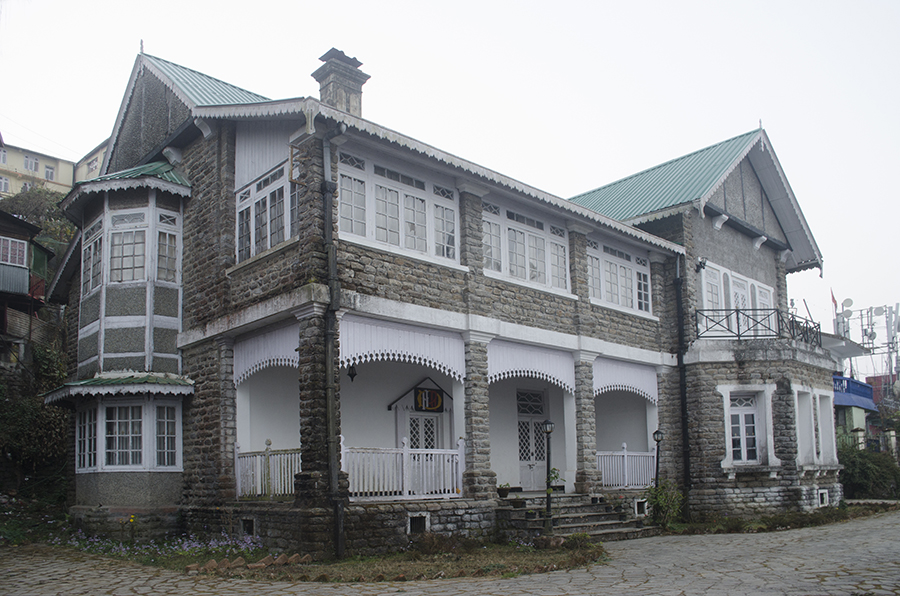
Elysia Place in Kurseong, the railway's headquarters

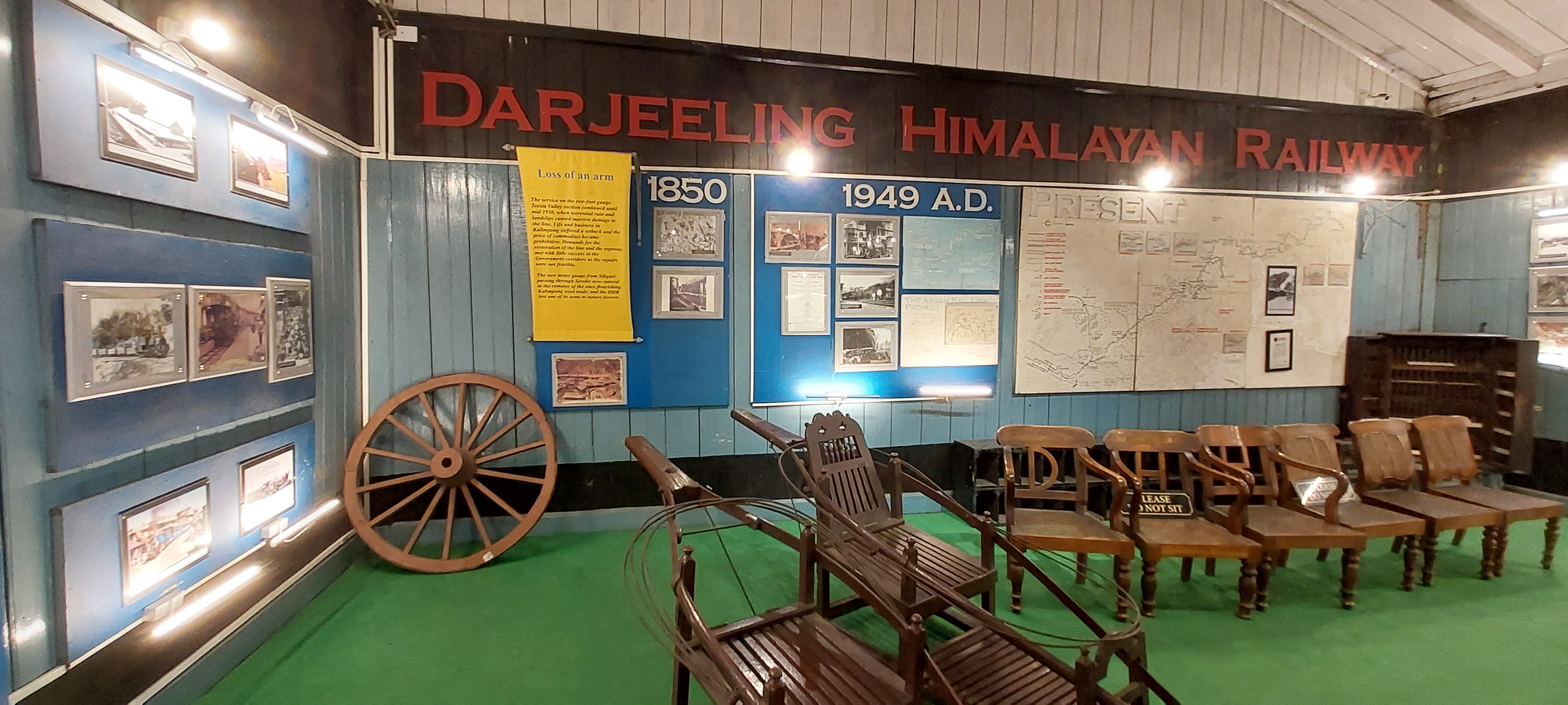
Darjeeling Himalayan Railway museums at Ghum railway station

The DHR and its assets, including the stations, line and vehicles, is owned by the government of India and entrusted to the Ministry of Railways. The Northeast Frontier Railway documented the railway in a comprehensive register, and handles its day-to-day maintenance and management. Several programs, divisions and departments of Indian Railways are responsible for operating, maintaining and repairing the DHR. It is protected by the 1989 Railway Act and the stipulations governing public property. It is now headed by the director, Darjeeling Himalayan Railway.

== Rolling stock ==
=== Present ===
==== Steam ====
All the steam locomotives currently in use on the railway are 0-4-0ST B-Class, built by Sharp, Stewart and Company and later the North British Locomotive Company between 1889 and 1925. A total of 34 were built but, by 2005, only 12 were still in use or being repaired by the railway.

A 1999 documentary Toy Train to the Clouds by film maker Nick Lera provides a record of the line and the locomotives as they were then operating.

In 2002, No. 787 was rebuilt for oil firing on the same principle as that used on Nilgiri Mountain Railway No. 37395. A diesel-powered generator was fitted to operate the oil burner and an electrically driven feed pump, and a diesel-powered compressor was fitted to power the braking system. The locomotive was also fitted with a feedwater heater. The rebuild dramatically changed its appearance. Trials of the refitted locomotive were disappointing, and it never entered regular service; in early 2011, it was in the Tindharia Works awaiting re-conversion to coal-firing. In early 2019, B787 was restored cosmetically and is now displayed on a plinth outside Siliguri Junction station.

In March 2001, No. 794 was transferred to the Matheran Hill Railway for a "joy train" (a steam-hauled tourist train) on that railway. It entered service there in May 2002.

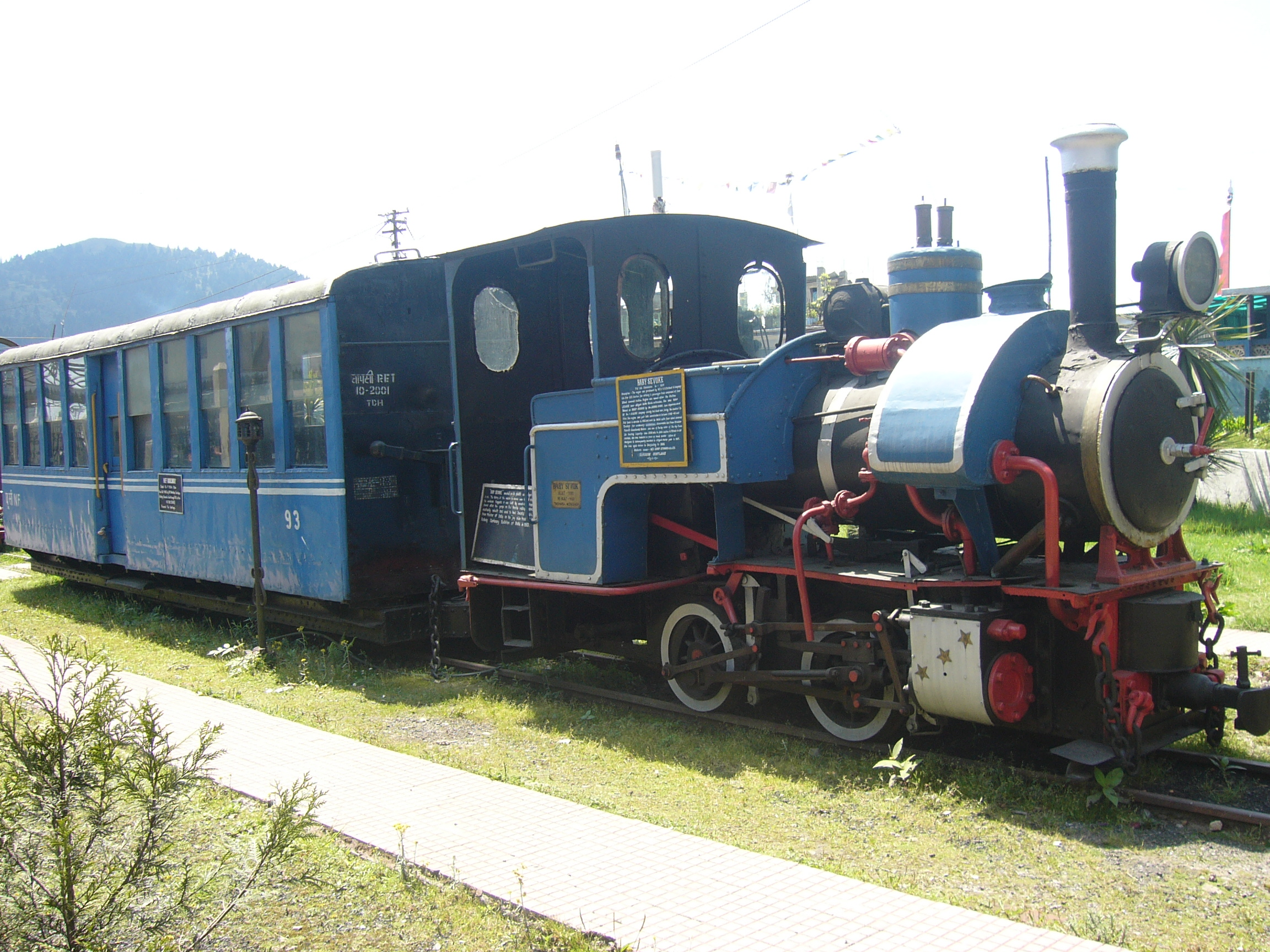
First construction locomotive called 'Baby Sivok'

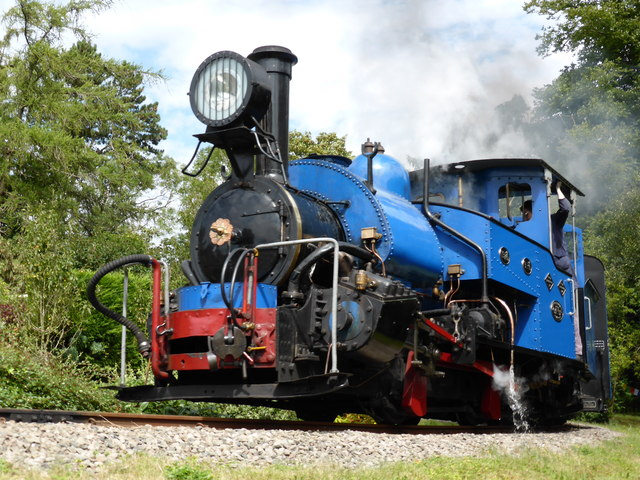
B-Class locomotive

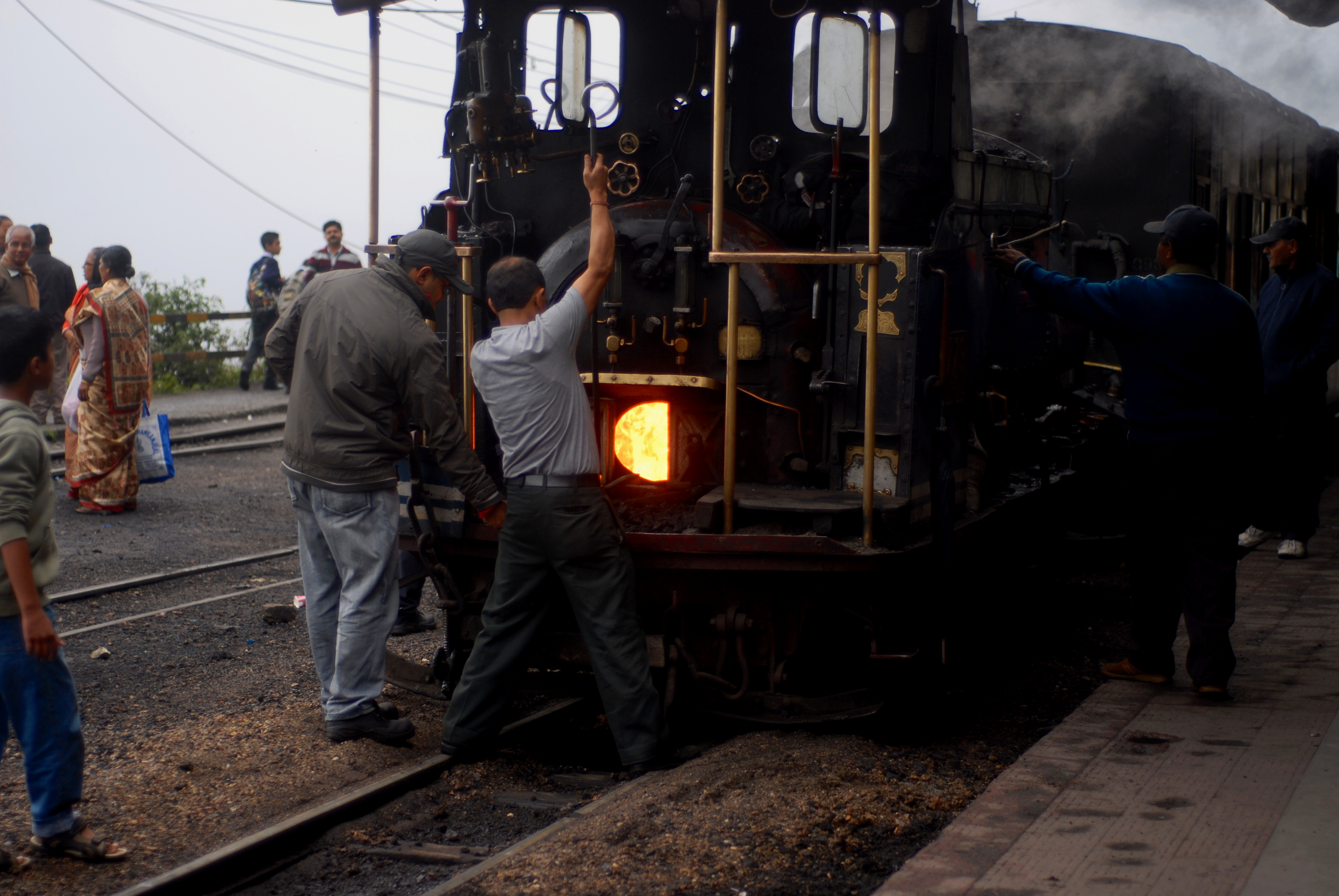
Loading coal into a locomotive

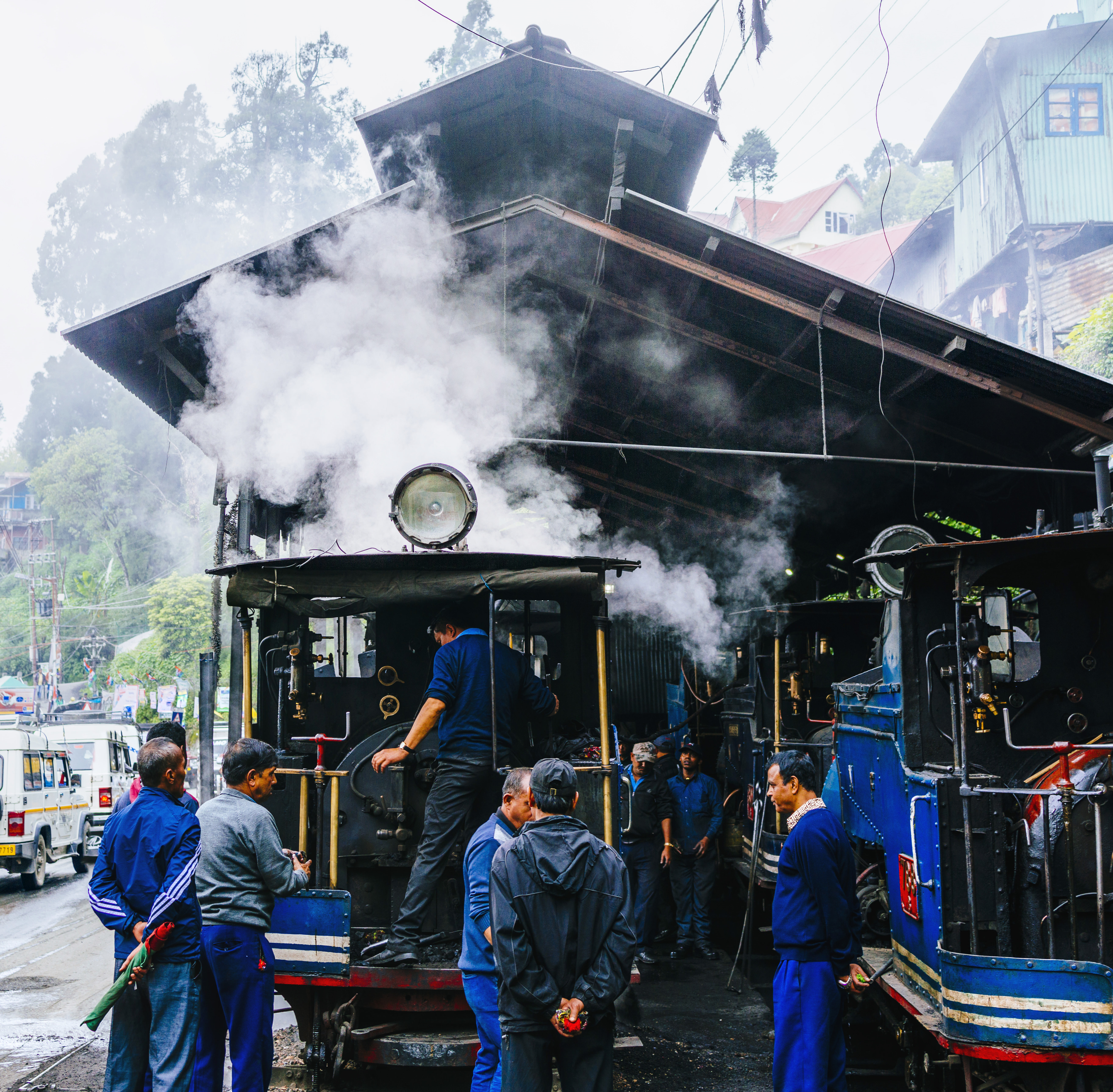
Daily maintenance

==== Diesel ====
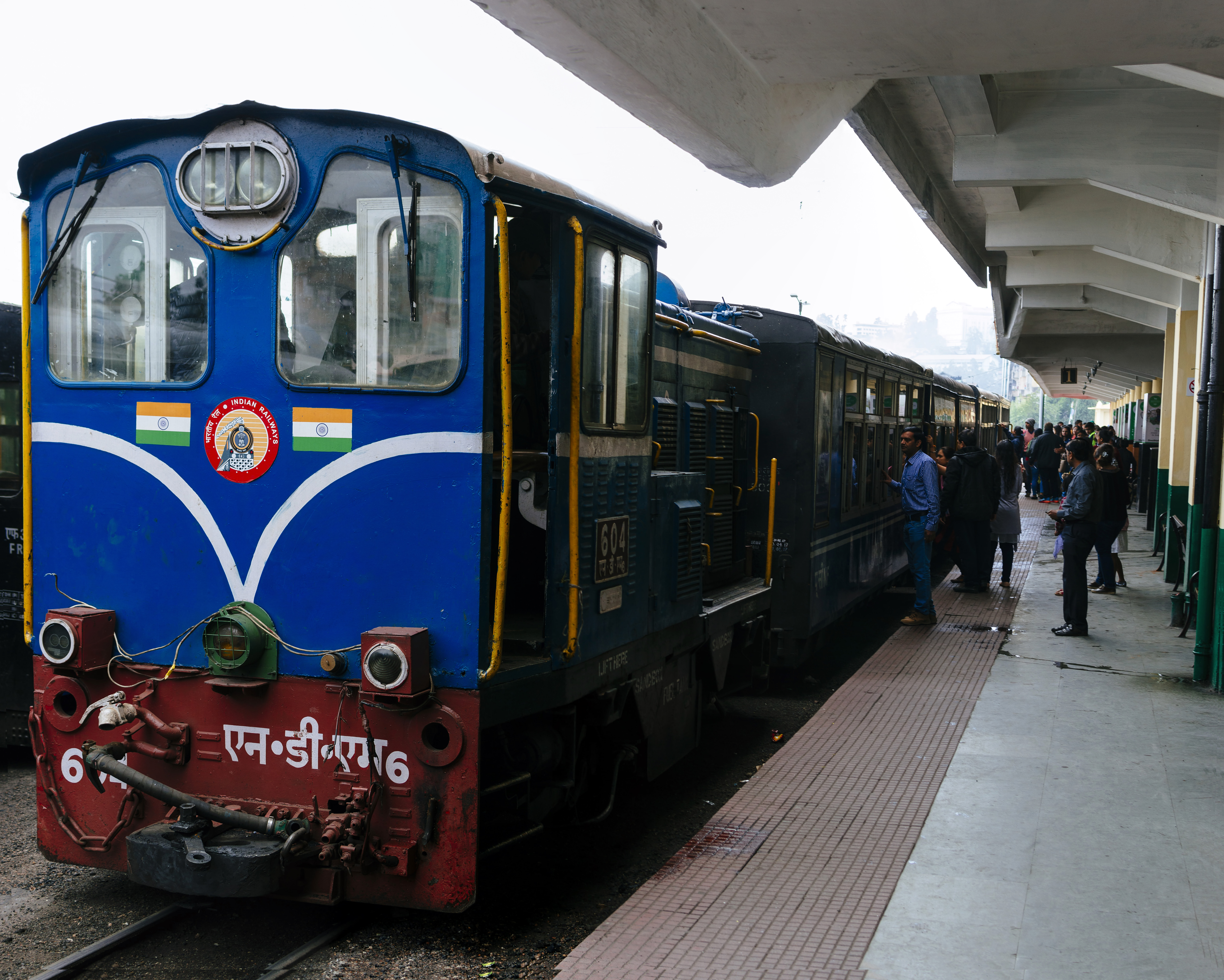
Diesel locomotive

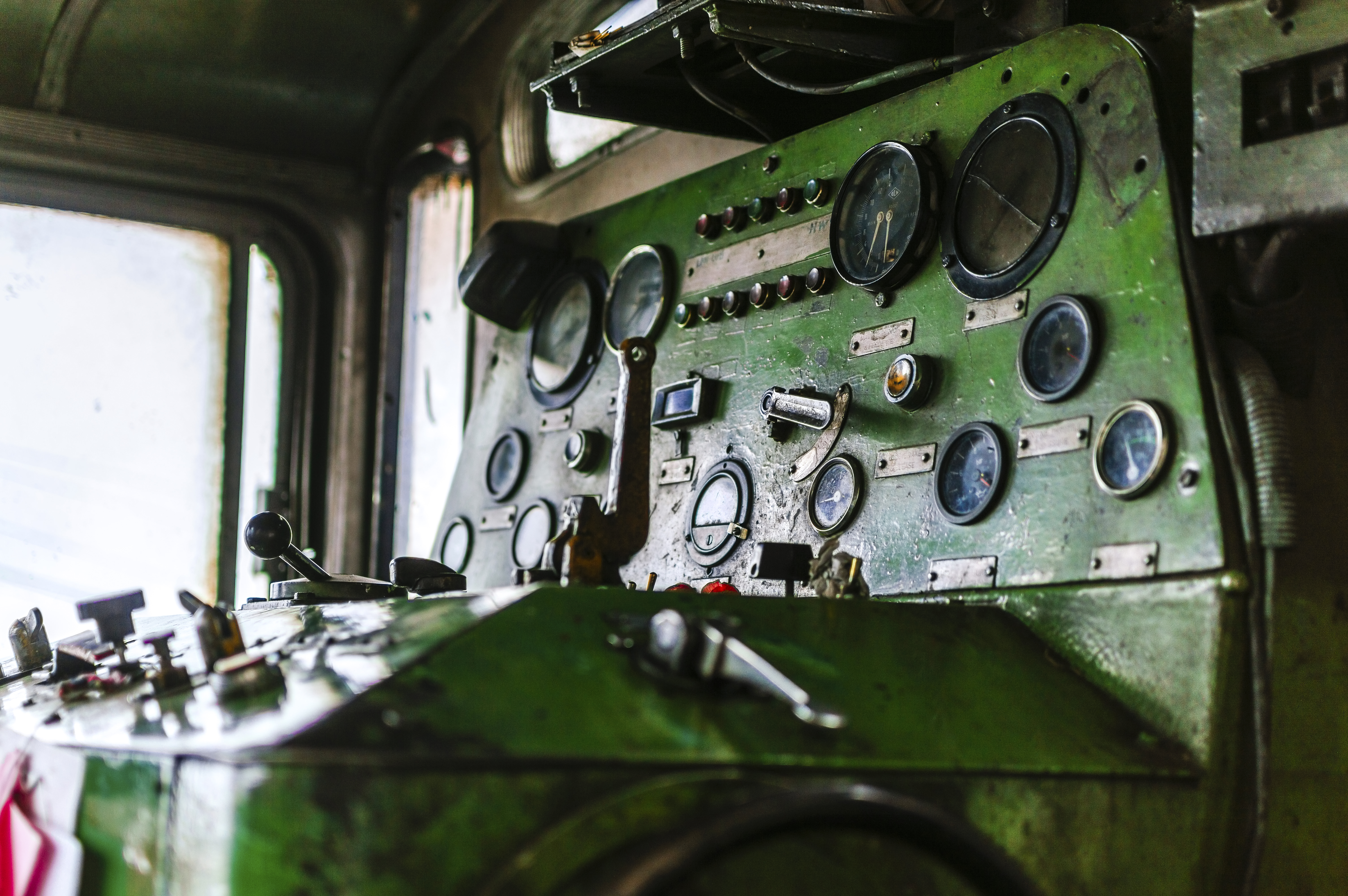
Diesel control panel

Six diesel locomotives are in use: Nos. 600–605 of the NDM-6 class, built in 1997. Three additional NDM-6 locomotives were expected to enter operational service during 2025.

=== Past ===
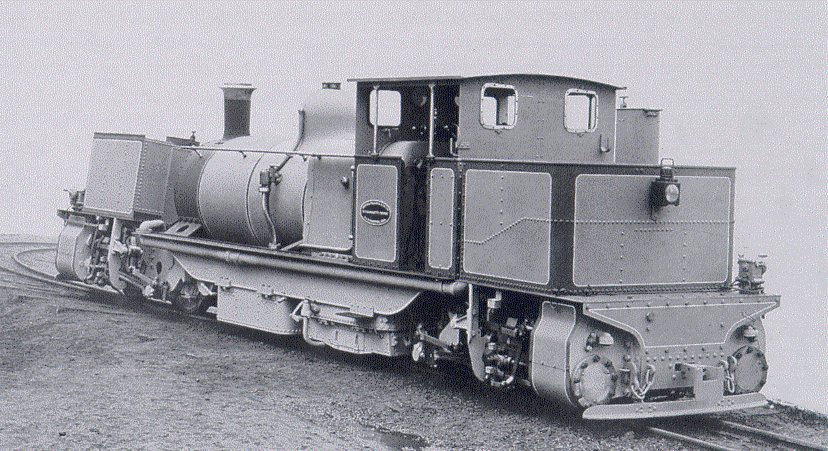
Garratt Class-D steam locomotive

The DHR purchased the third Garratt locomotive built, a D Class 0-4-0+0-4-0T, in 1910. Only one DHR steam locomotive has been taken out of India: DHR 778 (originally No. 19). After many years out of use at the Hesston Steam Museum, it was sold to Adrian Shooter in the UK and restored to working order. It was based for nearly 20 years at the privately owned Beeches Light Railway in Oxfordshire, and visited the Ffestiniog Railway, the Launceston Steam Railway and the Leighton Buzzard Light Railway during this time. In 2023, it was sold at auction to a newly formed trust who will keep it at the Statfold Barn Railway, and after the next overhaul plan to take the locomotive to other 2 ft gauge railways.

== Route ==
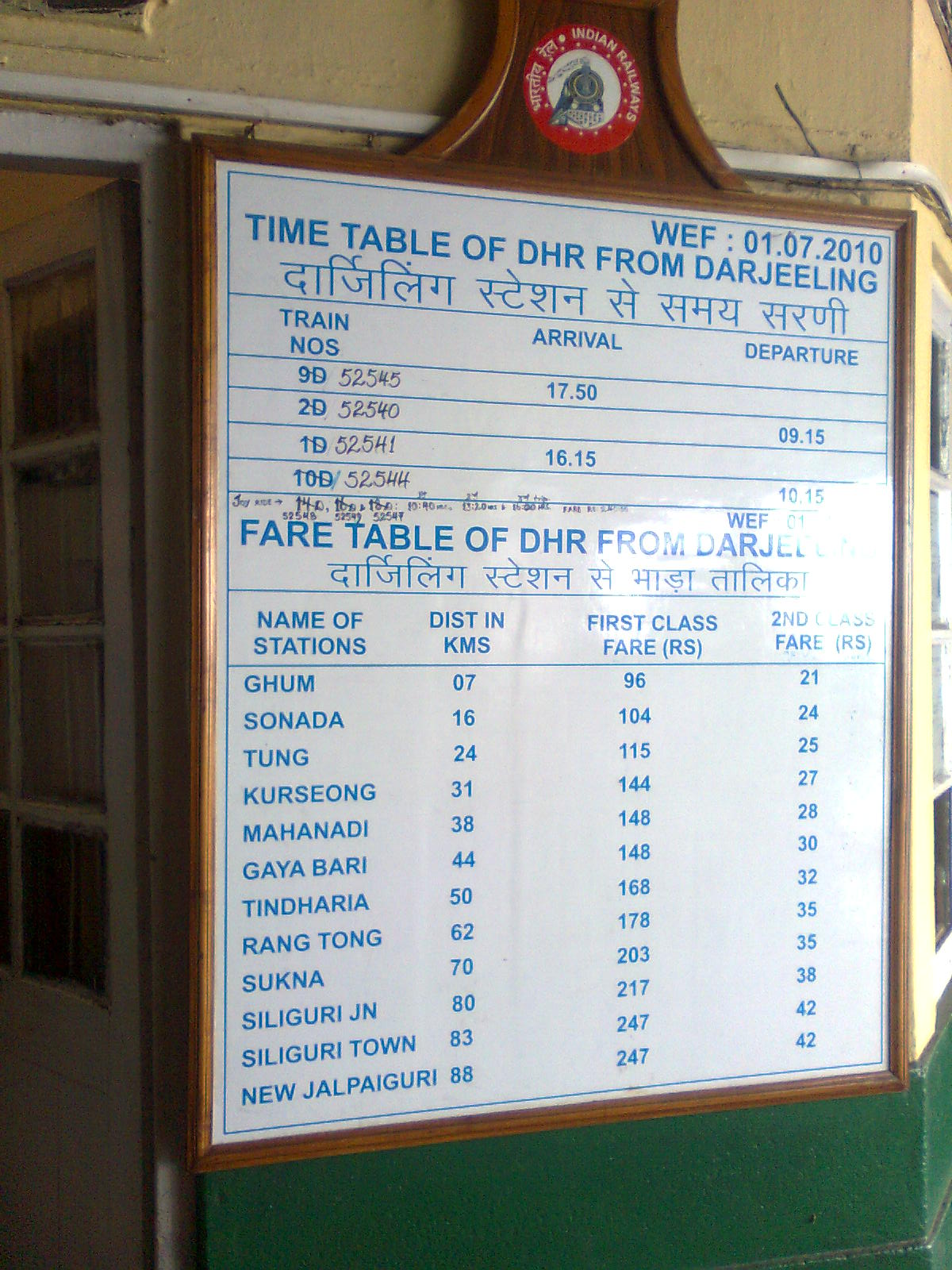
Railway distance chart

The line follows Hill Cart Road, which is part of National Highway 110. The track is on the roadside for long stretches, and both track and road might be blocked by a rockslide. Since a length of the road is flanked with buildings, the railway line often resembles urban tramway tracks. To warn pedestrians and drivers of an approaching train, engines are equipped with very loud horns and whistles which train drivers sound almost constantly.

A major difficulty faced by the DHR was the steepness of the terrain. Loops and zig-zags were incorporated along the route to achieve a comfortable gradient. When the train moves forward, reverses and then moves forward again (climbing a slope while doing so), it gains altitude along the side of the hill.

=== Stations ===
- New Jalpaiguri (NJP): New Jalpaiguri was the terminus of the 1964 southern extension to meet the new 1,676 mm (5 ft 6 in) broad gauge line to Assam.
- Siliguri Town: The line's original southern terminus
- Siliguri Junction: Siliguri Junction became a major station when a new line was built to Assam during the early 1950s. From NJP to Siliguri Junction, the 1,676 mm (5 ft 6 in) broad gauge line runs parallel to the DHR.
- Sukna: This station begins a change in the landscape, from flat plains to the wooded lower slopes of the mountains. The gradient of the railway changes dramatically. Loop 1, in the woods above Sukna, was removed after flood damage in 1991 and the site is obscured by the forest.
- Rangtong: A short distance above Rangtong is a water tank, better positioned than at the station in terms of water supply and distance from other water tanks. Loop 2 was removed in 1942 after flood damage. A new reverse, No. 1, was added for the longest reverse run. Loop No. 3, at Chunbatti, is now the lowest loop. Reverses No. 2 and 3 are between Chunbatti and Tindharia.
- Tindharia: Workshops are below the station. An office for engineers and a large locomotive shed are on a separate site. Above the station are three sidings, used to inspect the carriage while the locomotive is changed before the train continues towards Darjeeling.
- Loop 4: Known as Agony Point, the loop has the line's tightest curve.
- Gayabari
- Reverse No. 6: The last reverse on the climb
- Mahanadi
- Kurseong: Although a shed and several sidings are adjacent to the main line, the station proper is a dead end. Darjeeling-bound trains must back out of the station (across a busy road junction) to continue the climb. The station houses a one-room DHR museum with several exhibits, artifacts and vintage photos. At the centre of the room, a wooden showcase contains several old newspaper articles about the railway. After the station, the railway passes a busy shopping area.
- Tung
- Sonada
- Rongbull
- Jorebungalow: A storage point for tea bound for Kolkata, it connects Darjeeling to the rest of India.
- Ghum: Ghum, the line's summit, is India's highest station. The station building includes a first-floor museum, with larger exhibits in the old goods yard.
- Batasia Loop: The loop is 5 km (3.1 mi) from Darjeeling, below Ghum. There is a memorial to the Gorkha soldiers of the Indian Army who sacrificed their lives after Indian independence in 1947. The loop has a panoramic view of Darjeeling, with Kangchenjunga and other snow-capped mountains in the background.
- Darjeeling: The terminus of the line

== Incidents and accidents ==
- On 10 January 2017 a Darjeeling train derailed due to a faulty track, and 10 people were injured.
- On 7 May 2019 a train struck a car and derailed. No one was killed or injured.
- On 9 October 2019 a passenger on the train fell off it while taking a selfie. The person died from serious head injuries from the fall.

== Gallery ==
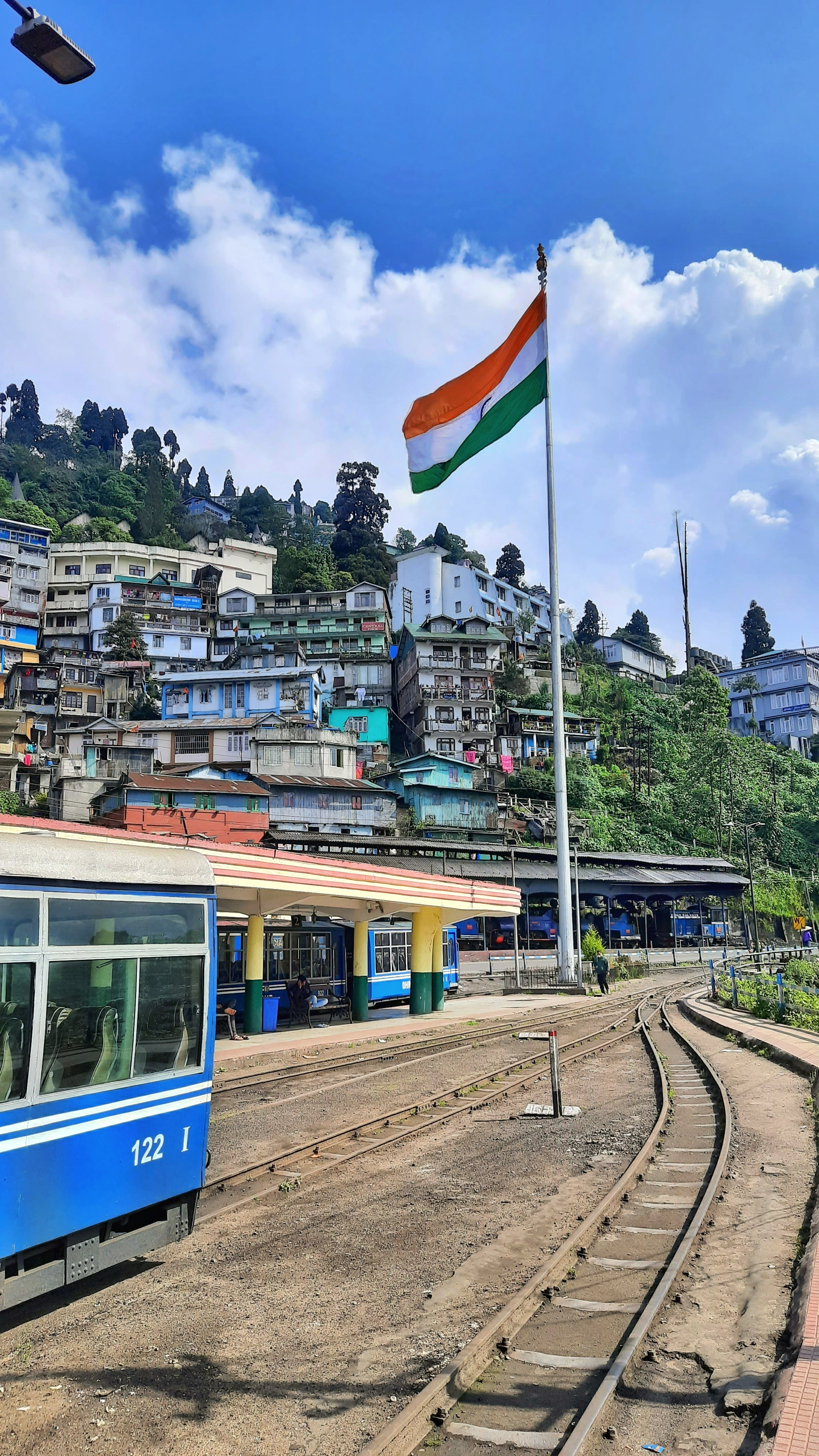
Darjeeling Station

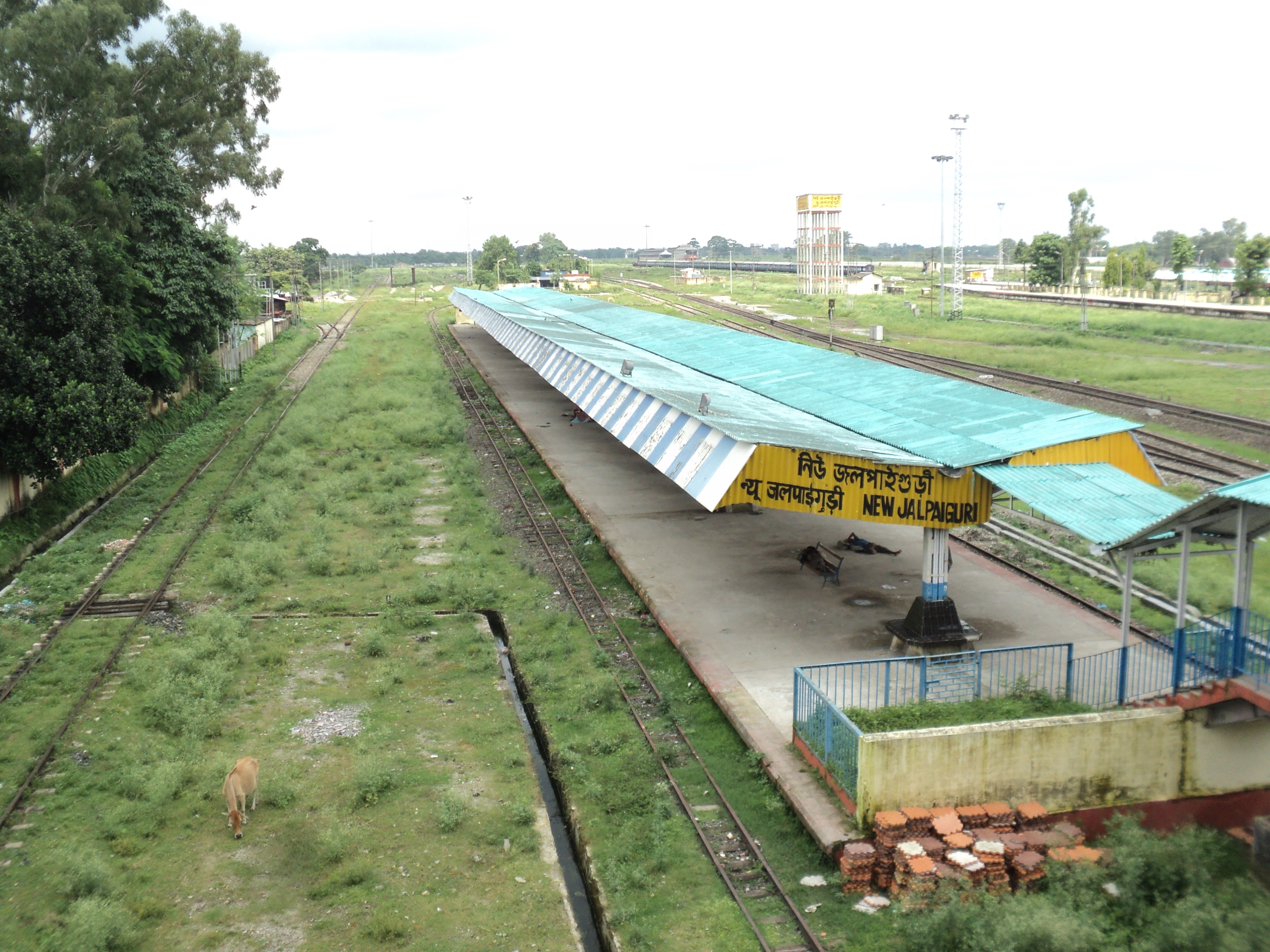
New Jalpaiguri

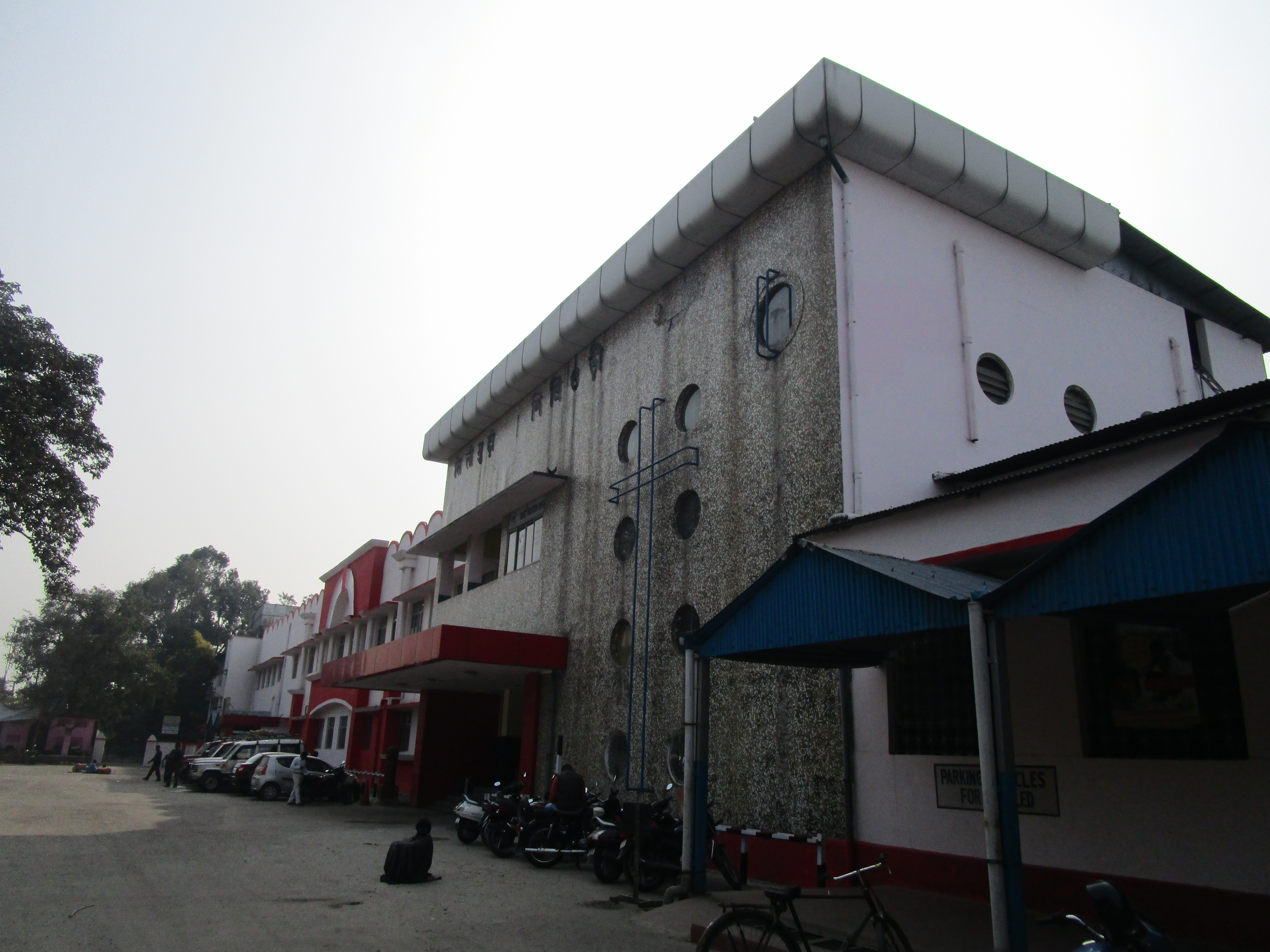
Siliguri Junction

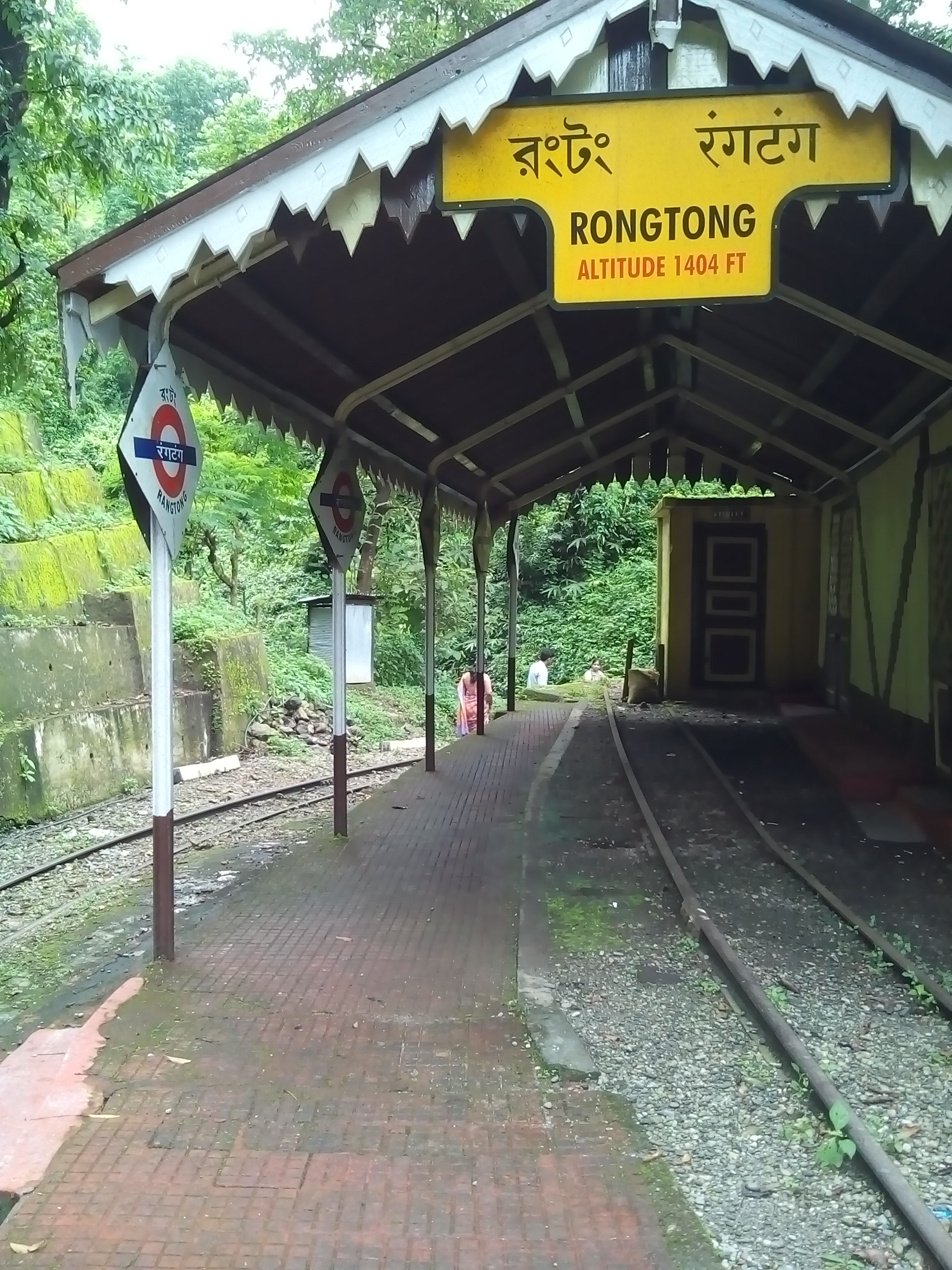
Rangtong

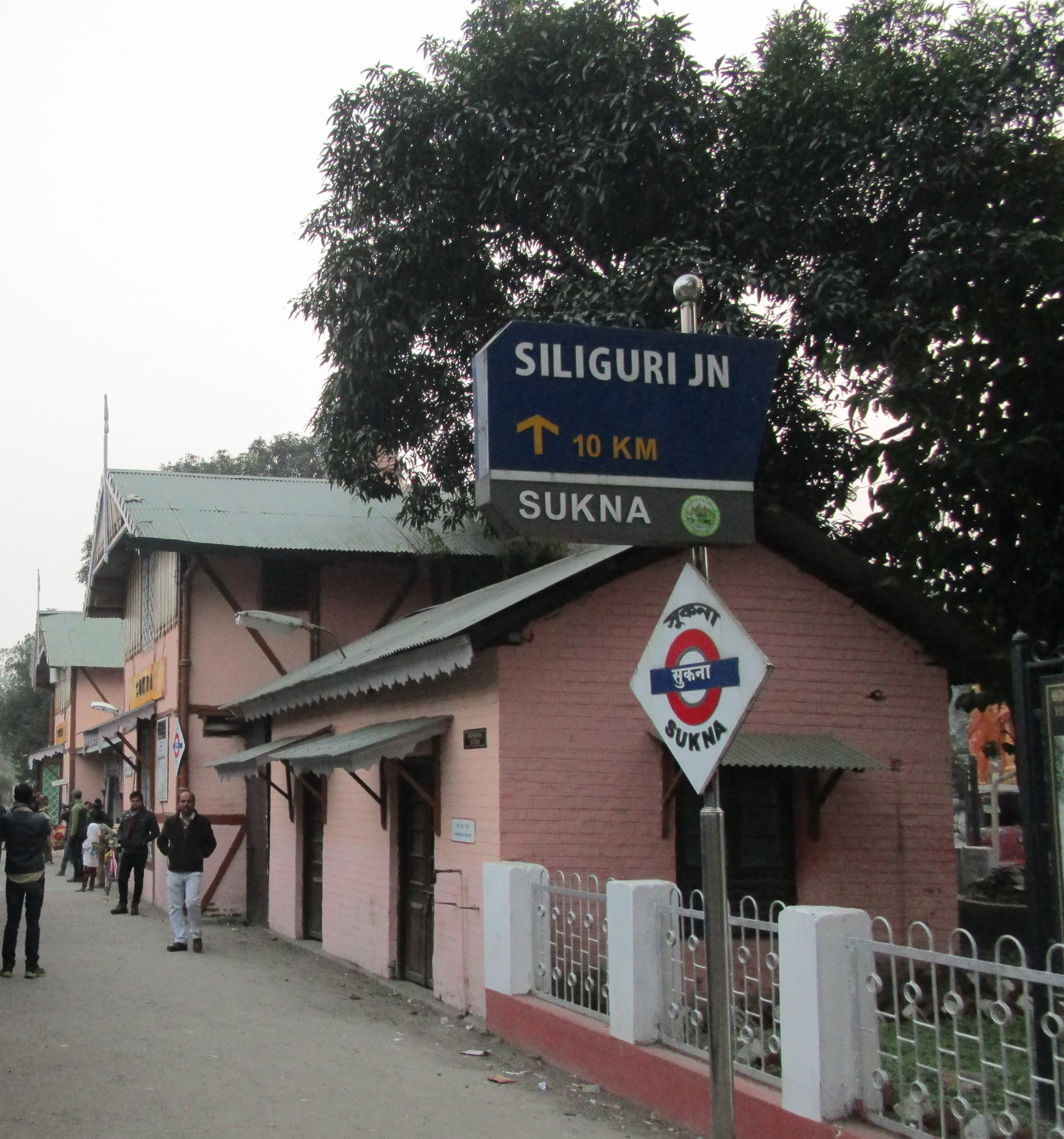
Sukna

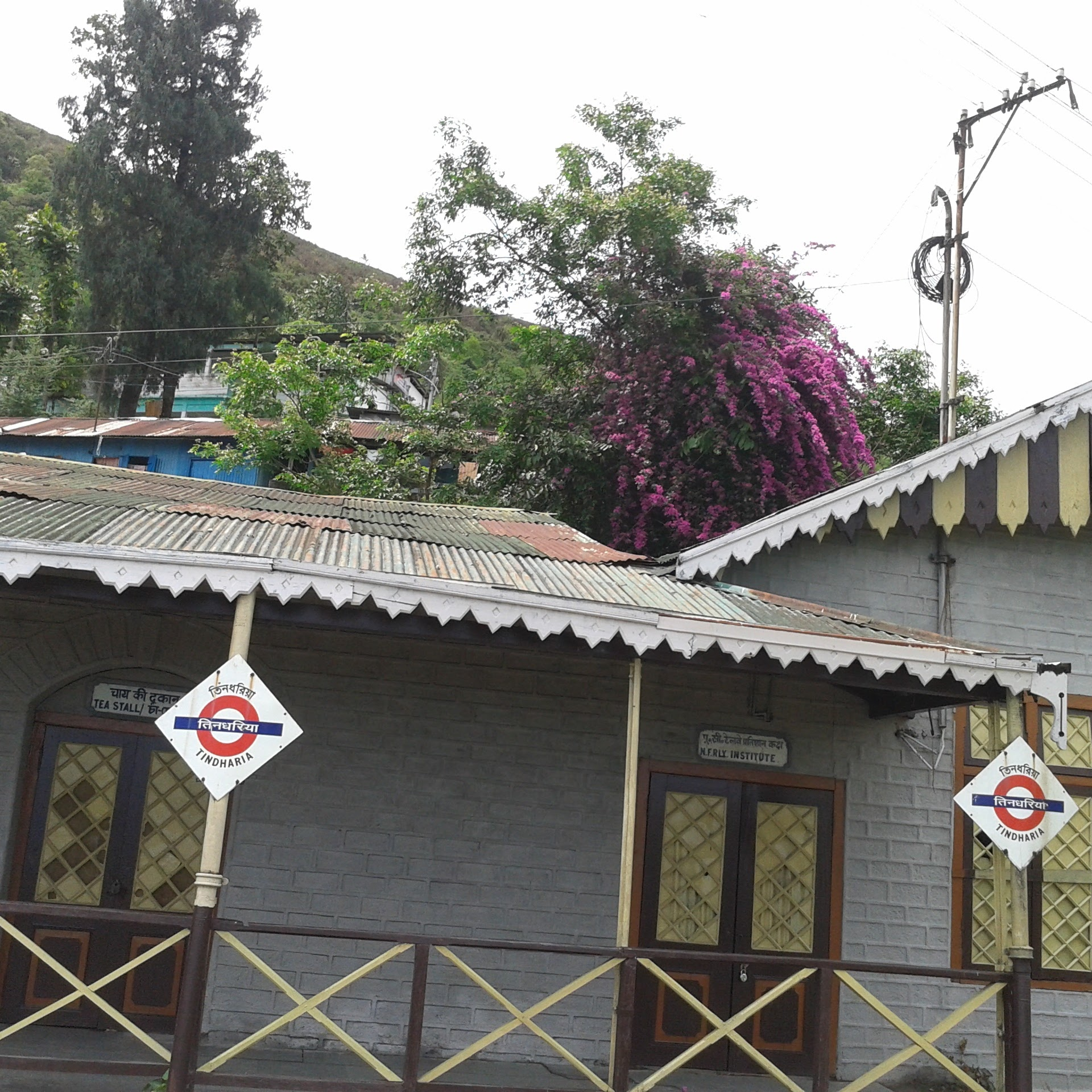
Tindharia

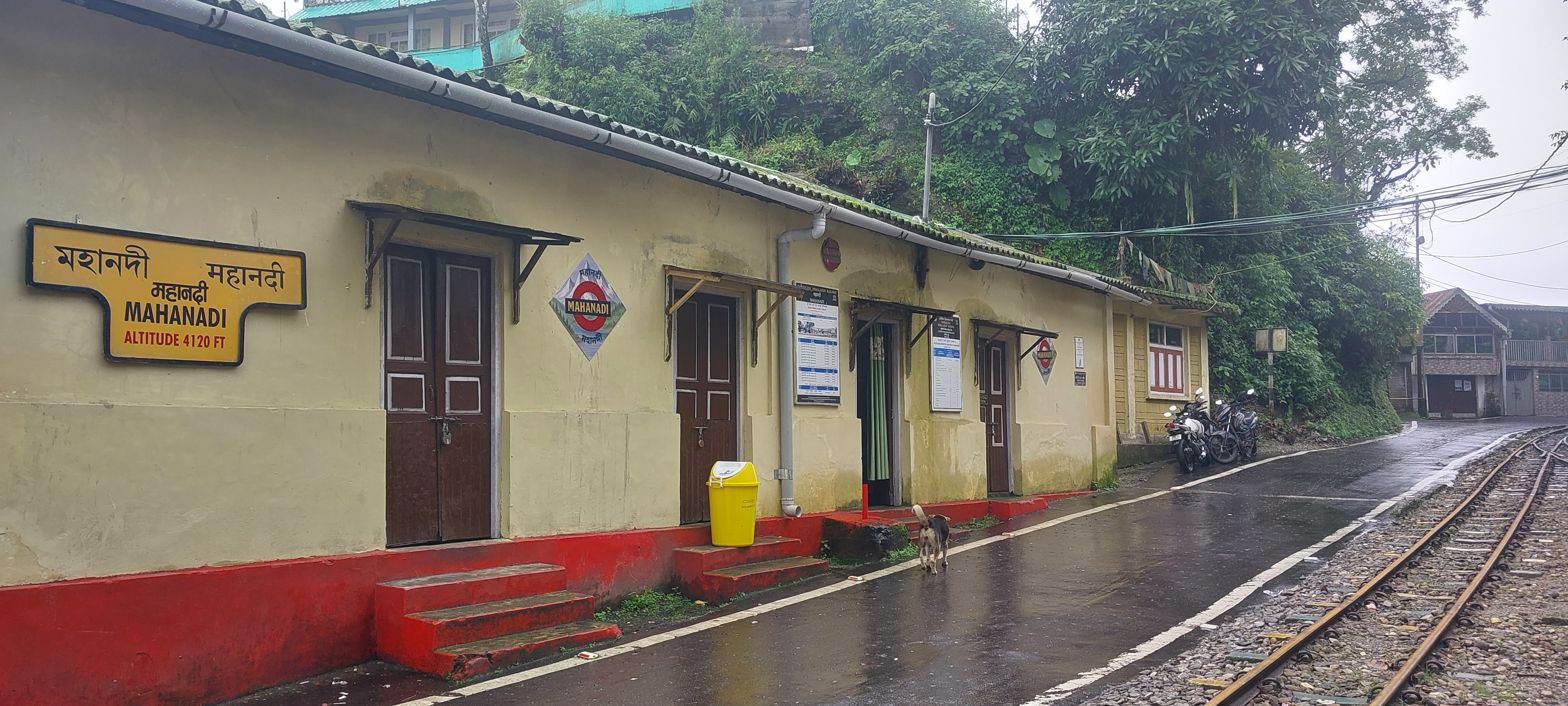

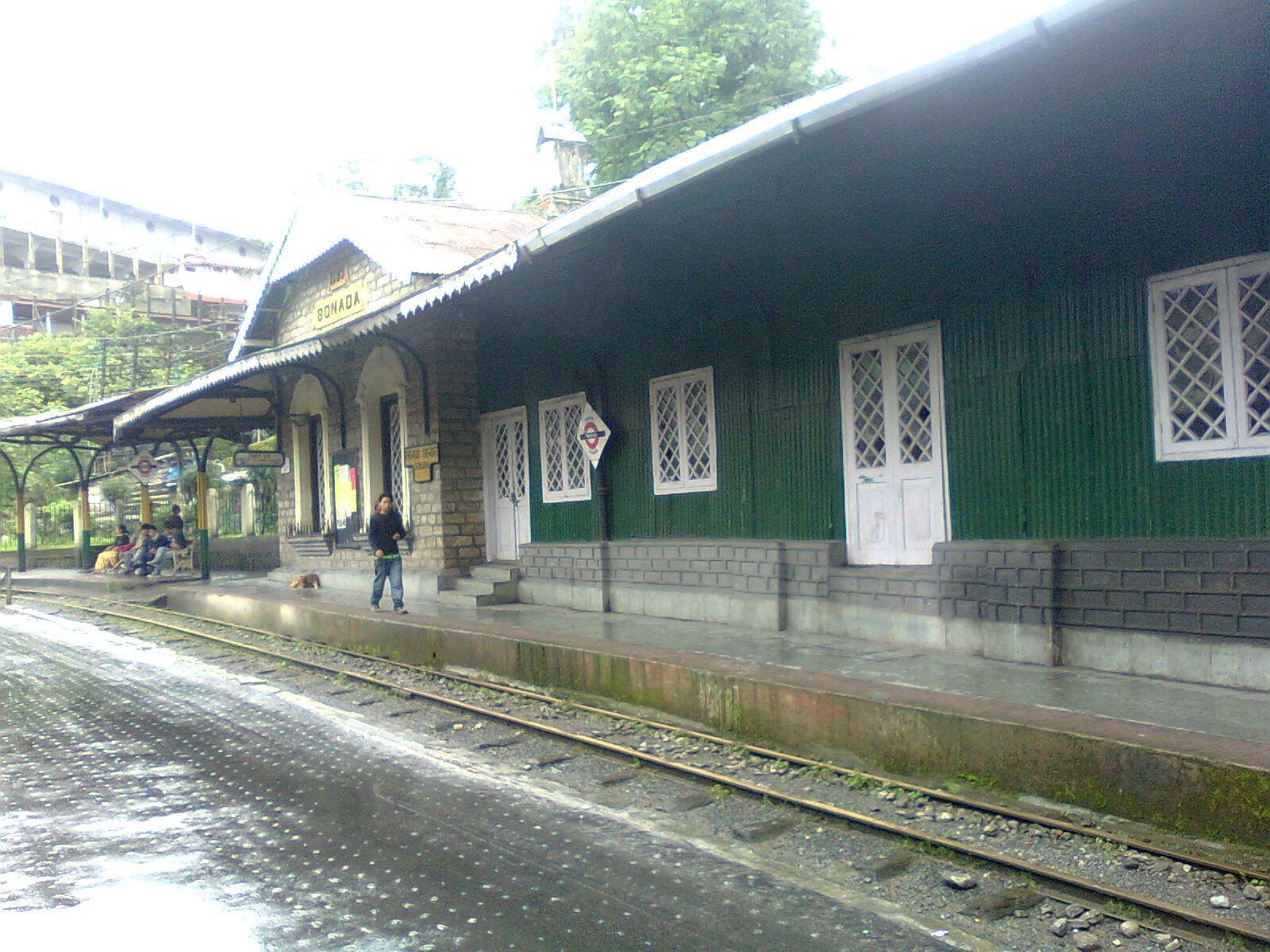
Sonada

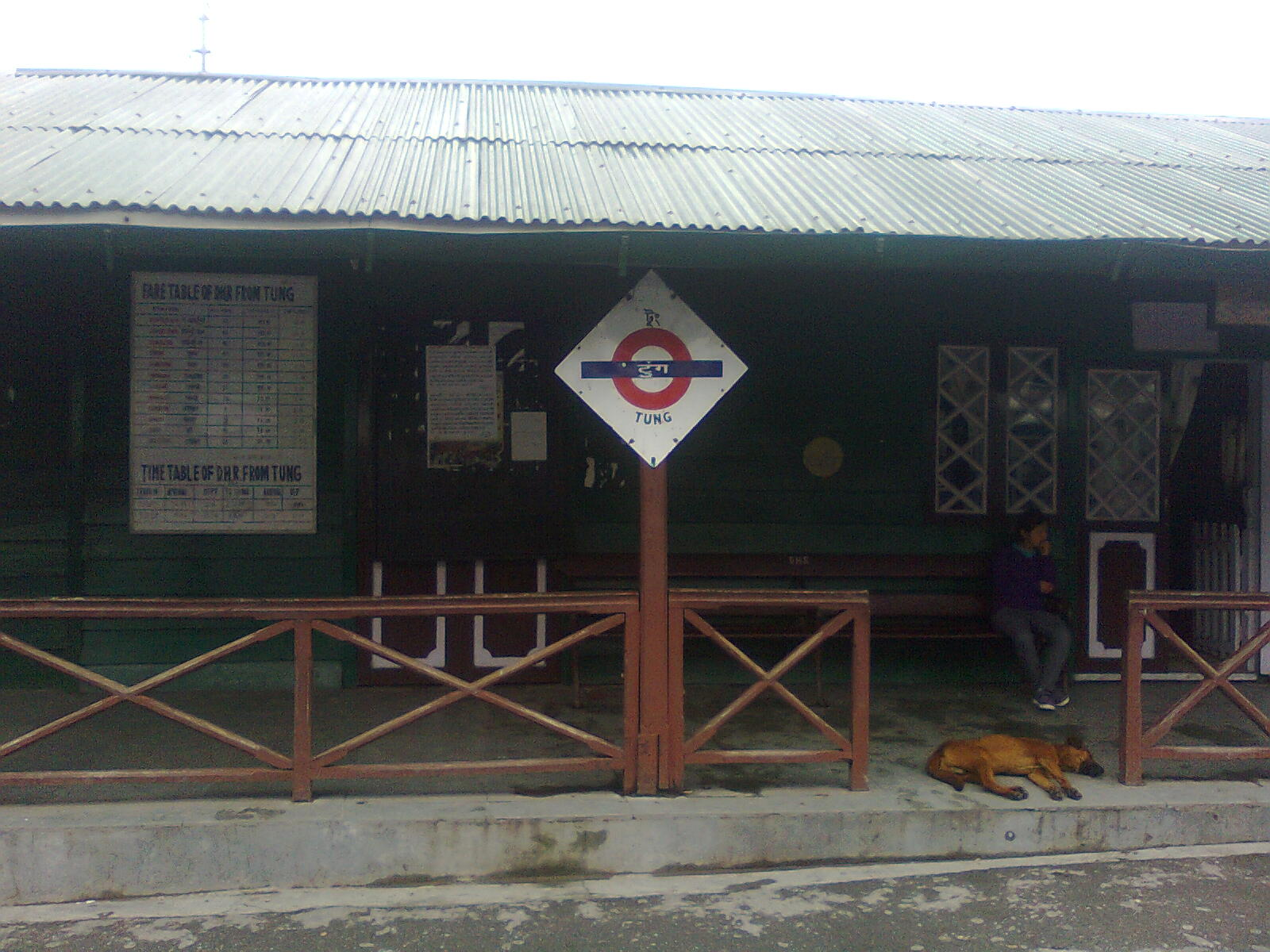
Tung

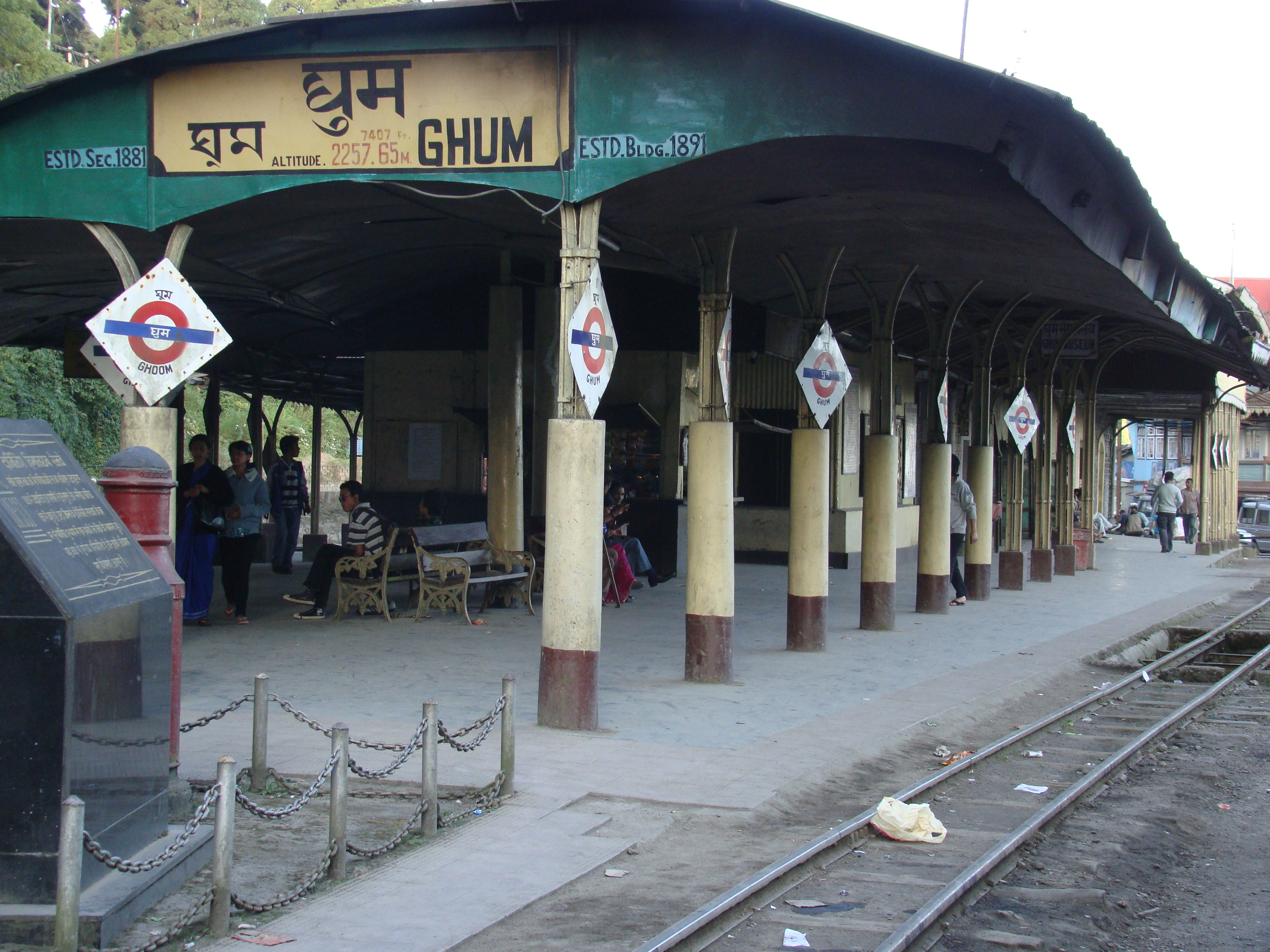
Ghum

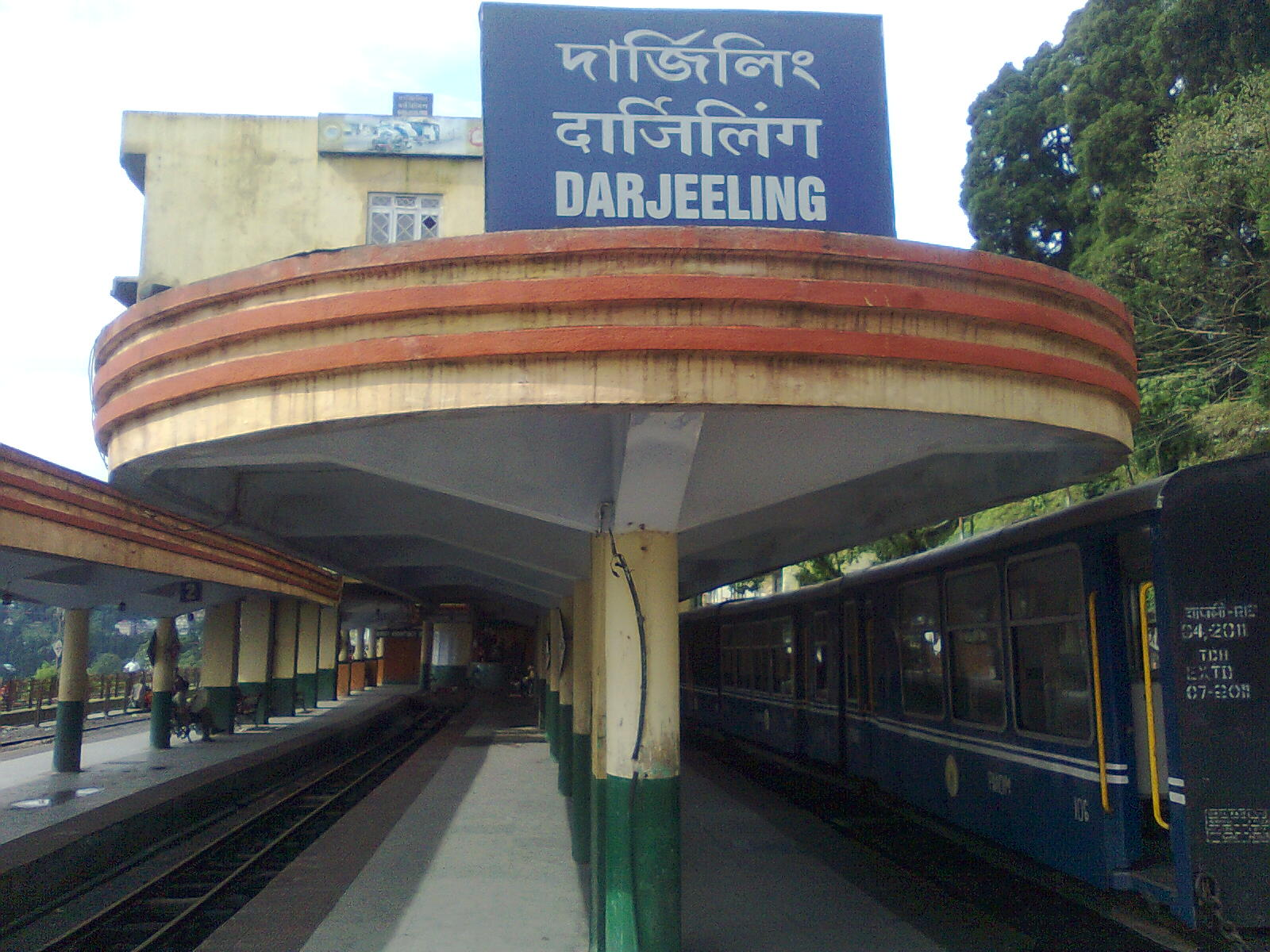
Darjeeling

== In popular culture ==
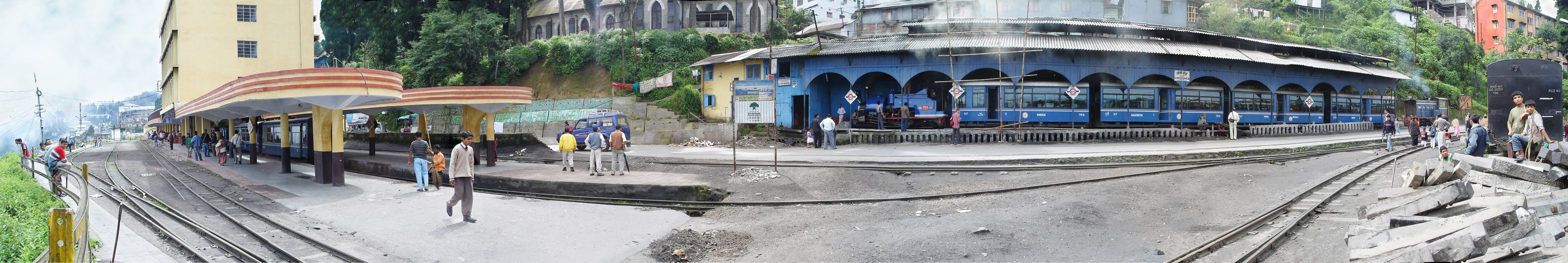
A panoramic view of the Darjeeling railway station

The Earl of Ronaldshay described a journey on the railway in the early 1920s:

Siliguri is palpably a place of meeting ... The discovery that here the metre gauge system ends and the two-foot gauge of the Darjeeling-Himalayan railway begins, confirms what all these things hint at ... One steps into a railway carriage which might easily be mistaken for a toy, and the whimsical idea seizes hold of one that one has accidentally stumbled into Lilliput. With a noisy fuss out of all proportion to its size the engine gives a jerk – and starts ... No special mechanical device such as a rack is employed – unless, indeed, one can so describe the squat and stolid hill-man who sits perched over the forward buffers of the engine and scatters sand on the rails when the wheels of the engine lose their grip of the metals and race, with the noise of a giant spring running down when the control has been removed. Sometimes we cross our own track after completing the circuit of a cone, at others we zigzag backwards and forwards; but always we climb at a steady gradient – so steady that if one embarks in a trolley at Ghum, the highest point on the line, the initial push supplies all the energy necessary to carry one to the bottom.

The trip to Darjeeling by rail has changed little since that time, and remains popular with travelers and rail enthusiasts. Like tea and the Ghurka culture, the DHR has become an essential feature of the landscape and an enduring part of Darjeeling's identity.

=== Film ===
Several films have depicted the railway. Protagonist Rajesh Khanna sings "Mere Sapno Ki Rani" to heroine Sharmila Tagore, who is on the train, in the 1969 film Aradhana. Other films which include the railway are Barfi!, Main Hoon Na, Parineeta and Raju Ban Gaya Gentleman. An anthropomorphized version of one of the B-Class locomotives appears briefly in Disney's Planes (2013) when an airplane flies through a tunnel and nearly collides with the train.

=== Television ===
The BBC series "The World About Us" made a documentary episode about the Indian Railways in 1975, titled "The Romance of Indian Railways". The documentary included a section on Darjeeling Himalayan Railway, with colour footage of the original steam trains in use.

The BBC made a series of three documentaries on the mountain railways of India, which was first broadcast in February 2010. The first episode covers the Darjeeling Himalayan Railway, the second the Nilgiri Mountain Railway, and the third the Kalka–Shimla Railway. The documentaries, directed by Tarun Bhartiya, Hugo Smith and Nick Mattingly, were produced by Gerry Troyna. The documentary on Darjeeling Himalayan Railway was directed by Tarun Bhartiya. The series won the UK Royal Television Society Award in June 2010.

== Darjeeling Himalayan Railway Society ==
The Darjeeling Himalayan Railway Society (DHRS) is a preservation and support group, founded in 1998 and with a membership of over 750 people across twenty countries. Until his death in December 2022, the President of the DHRS was the British railway executive Adrian Shooter.

== See also ==
- Darjeeling Mail
- Chowrasta Darjeeling
- Other mountain railways in India
  - Kalka–Shimla Railway
  - Nilgiri Mountain Railway
