= Franklin Prestage =

British-Indian railway engineer

- Born: 26 February 1830; London
- Died: 18 November 1897 (aged 67); Simla Molana
- Occupation: railway engineer

Franklin Prestage (1830-1897) was a British-Indian railway engineer who made major contributions to the construction of the Darjeeling Himalayan Railway.

== Life ==
He was born in London, but lived the major part of his life in British India. He was born in 1830 to Thomas Prestage and Augusta Wilson. He was married to Eliza Cary and had eight children. He died in 1897.

== Education ==
He trained as an engineer.

== Career ==
He was an agent of the Eastern Bengal Railway. He also served as a member of the Legislative Council of Bengal.

=== Darjeeling Himalayan Railway ===
In 1878, Franklin Prestage proposed the construction of the Darjeeling Himalayan Railway. He played a major role in its subsequent completion and realization.
