= Batasia Loop =

Batasia Loop বাতাসিয়া লুপ बतासे लूप
- Neighbourhood
- Location in West Bengal, India
- Coordinates: 27.0167°N 88.2471°E
- Country: India
- State: West Bengal
- District: Darjeeling District
- Area: Darjeeling
- Time zone: UTC+5:30 (IST)

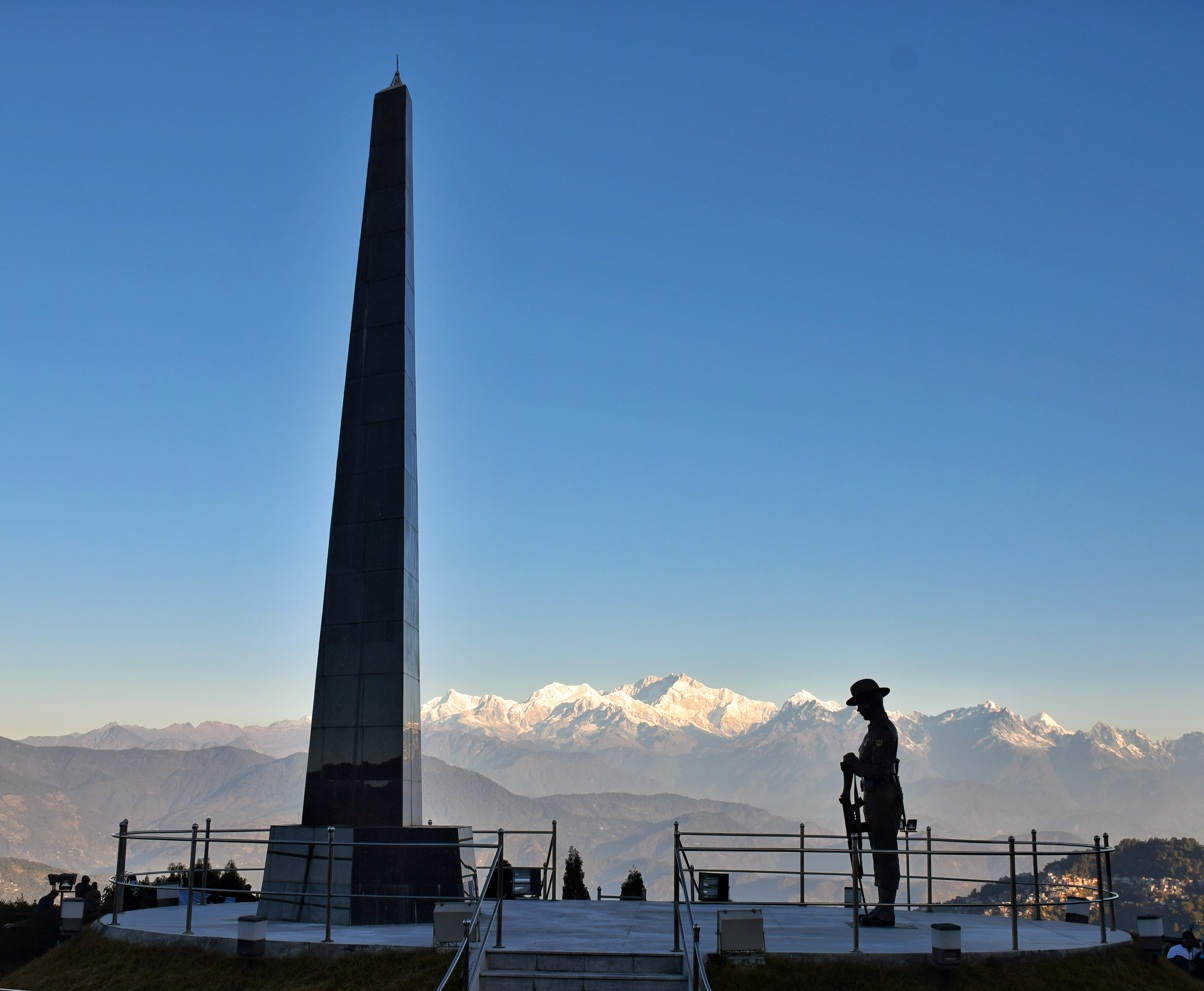
Batasia Loop War Memorial with Kanchanjunga.

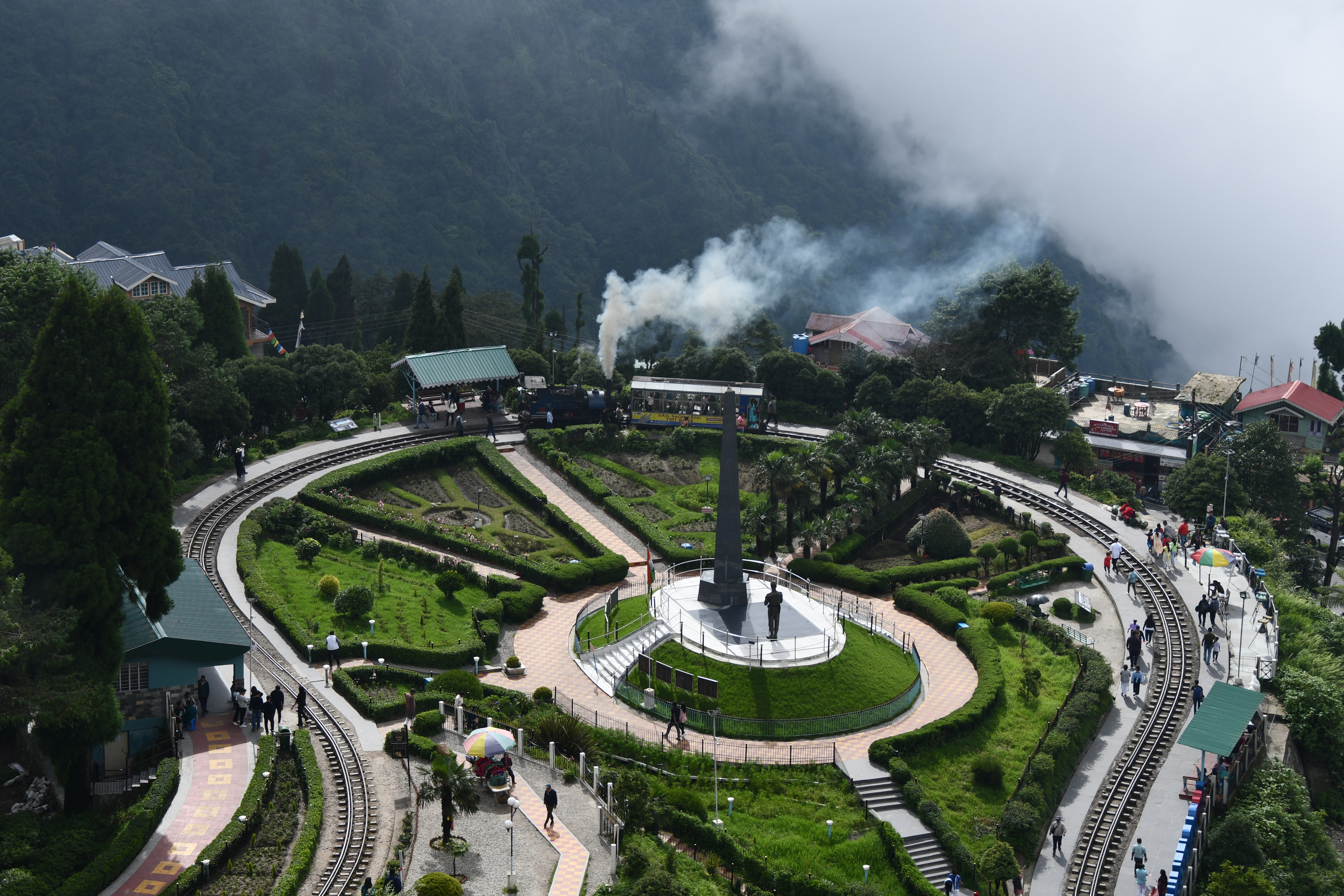
Batasia loop: A tourist attraction located in the Darjeeling Hills

The Batasia Loop is a spiral railway created to lower the gradient of ascent of the Darjeeling Himalayan Railway in Darjeeling district of West Bengal, India. At this point, the track spirals around over itself from the bottom of a small hill and over the hilltop. It was commissioned in 1919.

== Location ==
It is 5 km (3 mi) from Darjeeling, below Ghum. There is also a memorial to the Gorkha soldiers of the Indian Army who sacrificed their lives after the Indian Independence in 1947.

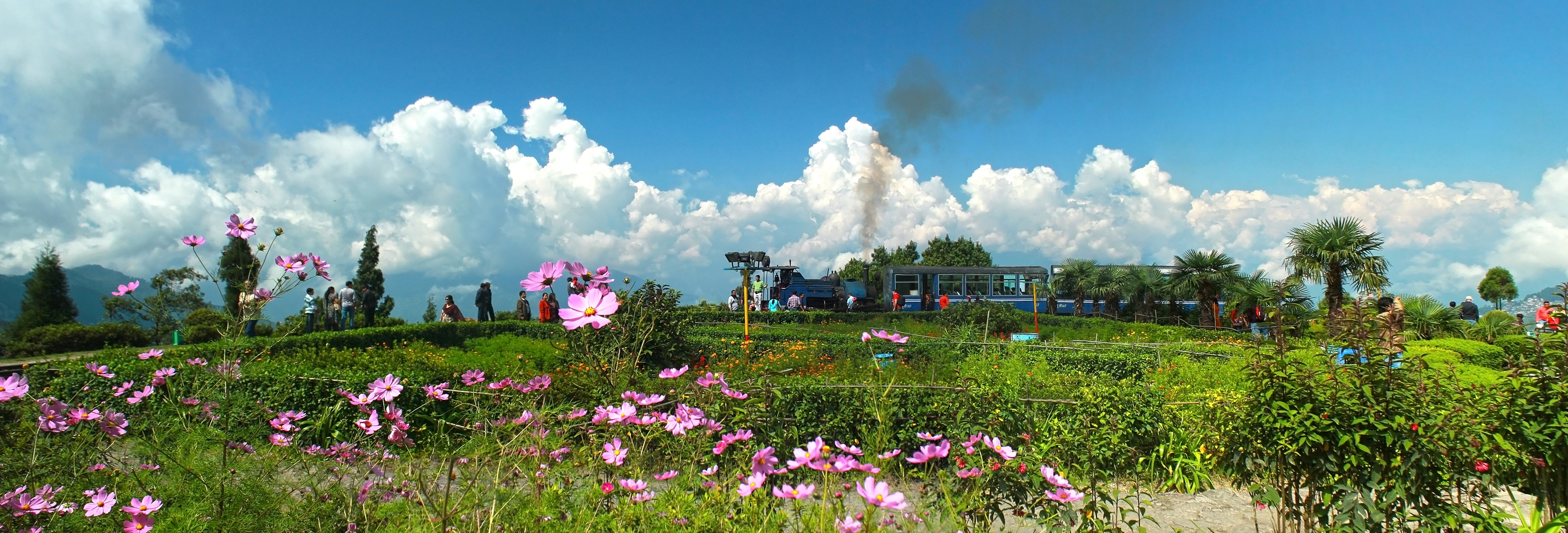
Batasia Loop, Darjeeling Himalayan Railway

== See also ==
- Chowrasta
- Balloon loop
- History of Darjeeling Himalayan Railway
- Zig zag (railway)
