= Batabari Tea Garden =

- Village
- Location in West Bengal, India Batabari Tea Garden (India)
- Coordinates: 26.8455°N 88.7954°E
- Country: India
- State: West Bengal
- District: Jalpaiguri

Population (2011)
  - Total: 2,644
- Time zone: UTC+5:30 (IST)
- PIN: 735206
- Telephone/STD code: 03562
- Vehicle registration: WB
- Lok Sabha constituency: Alipurduar
- Vidhan Sabha constituency: Nagrakata
- Website: jalpaiguri.gov.in

Batabari Tea Garden is a village and a gram panchayat in the Matiali CD block in the Malbazar subdivision of the Jalpaiguri district in the state of West Bengal, India.

== Etymology ==
The houses are made of type of bamboo known as ‘bata’, hence the name Batabari.

== Geography ==
Places and tea estates in Malbabazar subdivision (including Mal, Nagrakata and Matiali CD blocks) in Jalpaiguri district
CT: census town, R: rural/ urban centre, N: neighbourhood, NP: national park/ wildlife sanctuary, TE: tea estate
Abbreviations used in names – TG for Tea Garden (town/village), TE for Tea Estate, JRS: junction railway station
Owing to space constraints in the small map, the actual locations in a larger map may vary slightly

=== Location ===
Batabari Tea Garden is located at 26.8455°N 88.7954°E. Batabari is 53 km (33 mi) from Jalpaiguri and 51 km (32 mi) from New Jalpaiguri Junction railway station. Chalsa Junction railway station is located nearby.

=== Area overview ===
Gorumara National Park has overtaken traditionally popular Jaldapara National Park in footfall and Malbazar has emerged as one of the most important towns in the Dooars. Malbazar subdivision is presented in the map alongside. It is a predominantly rural area with 88.62% of the population living in rural areas and 11.32% living in the urban areas. Tea gardens in the Dooars and Terai regions produce 226 million kg or over a quarter of India's total tea crop. Some tea gardens were identified in the 2011 census as census towns or villages. Such places are marked in the map as CT (census town) or R (rural/ urban centre). Specific tea estate pages are marked TE.

Note: The map alongside presents some of the notable locations in the subdivision. All places marked in the map are linked in the larger full screen map.

== Demographics ==
As per the 2011 Census of India, Batabari Tea Garden had a total population of 2,644. There were 1,277 (48%) males and 1,367 (52%) females. There were 325 persons in the age range of 0 to 6 years. The total number of literate people in Batabari Tea Garden was 1,415 (68.61.02% of the population over 6 years).

== Tourism ==
The main attraction of the place is the landscape and the tea garden. Batabari has a number of resorts for comfortable stay. While staying at Batabari one can visit Gorumara National Park, Jaldapara National Park and Chapramari Wildlife Sanctuary. Other attractions in the area are: Dam Dim, Chalsa, India, Malbazar, Samsing and Phuntsholing (in Bhutan).
