= Zurantee Tea Garden =

- Village
- Location in West Bengal, India Zurantee Tea Garden (India)
- Coordinates: 26.9391°N 88.7707°E
- Country: India
- State: West Bengal
- District: Jalpaiguri

Population (2011)
  - Total: 5,402
- Time zone: UTC+5:30 (IST)
- PIN: 735223
- Telephone/STD code: 03562
- Vehicle registration: WB
- Lok Sabha constituency: Alipurduars
- Vidhan Sabha constituency: Nagrakata
- Website: jalpaiguri.gov.in

Zurantee Tea Garden (also spelled Juranti) is a village in the Matiali CD block in the Malbazar subdivision of the Jalpaiguri district in the state of West Bengal, India.

== Geography ==
Places and tea estates in Malbabazar subdivision (including Mal, Nagrakata and Matiali CD blocks) in Jalpaiguri district
CT: census town, R: rural/ urban centre, N: neighbourhood, NP: national park/ wildlife sanctuary, TE: tea estate
Abbreviations used in names – TG for Tea Garden (town/village), TE for Tea Estate, JRS: junction railway station
Owing to space constraints in the small map, the actual locations in a larger map may vary slightly

=== Location ===
Zurantee Tea Garden is located at 26.9391°N 88.7707°E.

=== Area overview ===
Gorumara National Park has overtaken traditionally popular Jaldapara National Park in footfall and Malbazar has emerged as one of the most important towns in the Dooars. Malbazar subdivision is presented in the map alongside. It is a predominantly rural area with 88.62% of the population living in rural areas and 11.32% living in the urban areas. Tea gardens in the Dooars and Terai regions produce 226 million kg or over a quarter of India's total tea crop. Some tea gardens were identified in the 2011 census as census towns or villages. Such places are marked in the map as CT (census town) or R (rural/ urban centre). Specific tea estate pages are marked TE.

Note: The map alongside presents some of the notable locations in the subdivision. All places marked in the map are linked in the larger full screen map.

== Demographics ==
As per the 2011 Census of India, Juranti Tea Garden had a total population of 5,402. There were 2,640 (49%) males and 2,762 (51%) females. There were 600 persons in the age range of 0 to 6 years. The total number of literate people in Juranti was 3,020 (62.89% of the population over 6 years).

== Tourism ==
Zurantee Tea Garden in the central Dooars is 3 hours drive from Bagdogra airport, via Chalsa. "Situated in a picturesque landscape with low hills which are adorned with tea bushes, the Zurrantee Tea Garden" has access to other tourist destinations such as Murti, Gorumara National Park, Bindu, Jhaldhaka Hydel Project, Samsing, or for moving on to Darjeeling or Gangtok.

== Tea gardens in the Dooars ==
Tea gardens in the Dooars produce around 325 million kg of tea, around a quarter of the total Indian production of 1,250 million kg. Labour cost is about 60 per cent of the cost of production of tea. As cost of labour rises, tea garden operations are becoming increasingly unviable. Between 2002 and 2007, 17 tea gardens shut down in the Dooars and the renowned Goenka Duncans group recently shut down 7 tea gardens. The latter alone lead to the loss of employment for around 25,000 workers. At least 1,200 deaths have been reported in the area.
