= Murti, Jalpaiguri =

Murti
- Inhabited place
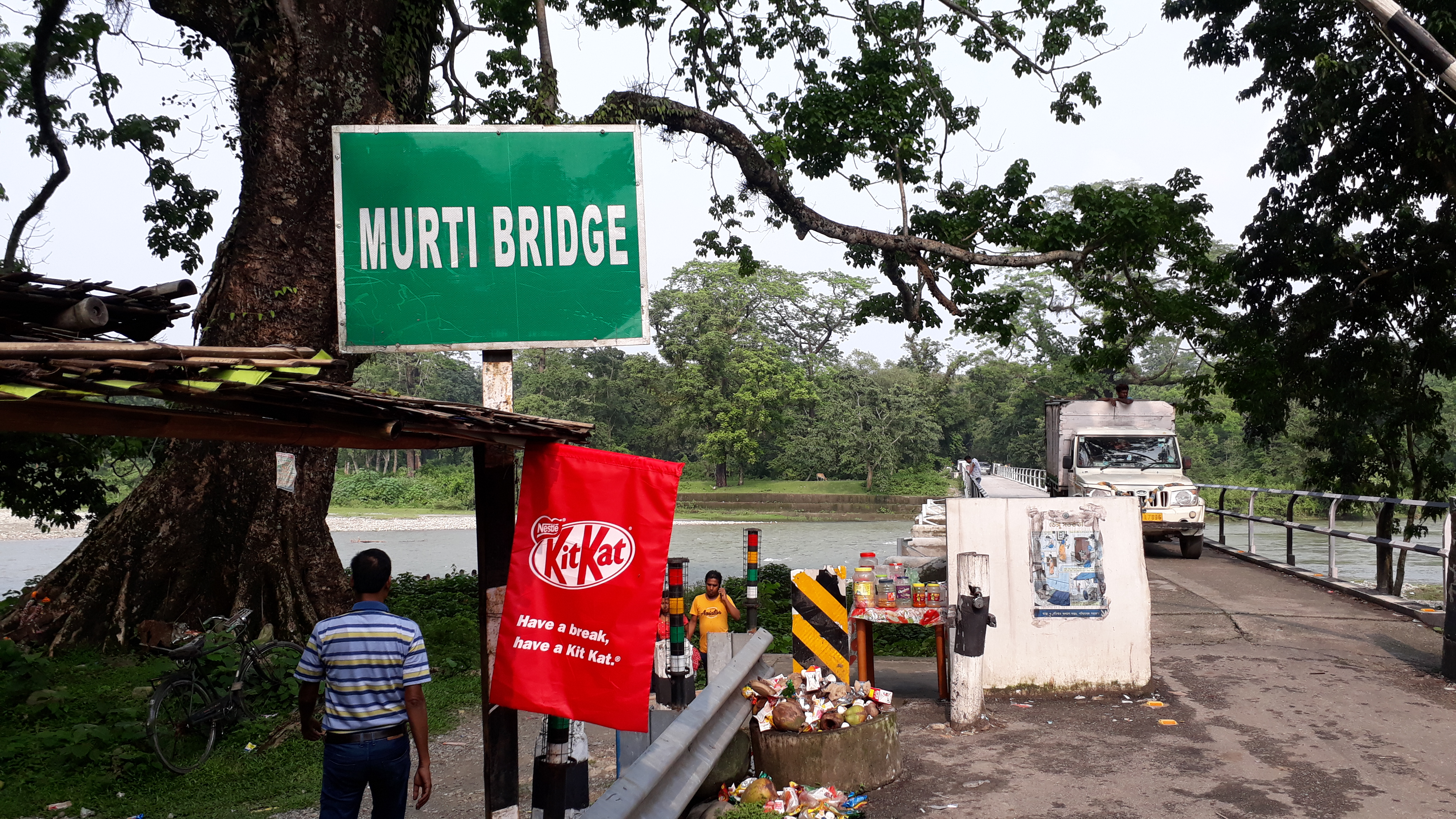
- Murti river bridge at Murti

- Location in West Bengal, India Murti (India)
- Coordinates: 26.8425°N 88.8254°E
- Country: India
- State: West Bengal
- District: Jalpaiguri
- Time zone: UTC+5:30 (IST)
- PIN: 735206
- Telephone/STD code: 03562
- Vehicle registration: WB
- Lok Sabha constituency: Alipurduar
- Vidhan Sabha constituency: Nagrakata
- Website: jalpaiguri.gov.in

Murti is an inhabited place in the Matiali CD block in the Malbazar subdivision of the Jalpaiguri district in the state of West Bengal, India.

== Geography ==
Places and tea estates in Malbabazar subdivision (including Mal, Nagrakata and Matiali CD blocks) in Jalpaiguri district
CT: census town, R: rural/ urban centre, N: neighbourhood, NP: national park/ wildlife sanctuary, TE: tea estate
Abbreviations used in names – TG for Tea Garden (town/village), TE for Tea Estate, JRS: junction railway station
Owing to space constraints in the small map, the actual locations in a larger map may vary slightly

=== Location ===
Murti is located at 26.8425°N 88.8254°E.

This place is about 8 kilometres away from Chalsa, India and 60 km away from Jalpaiguri. It is famous for its picturesque scenery. Excellent scenic beauty is the main attraction of this site. Both Gorumara National Park and Chapramari Wildlife Sanctuary are very close to Murti. One can get day visit pass from Lataguri Interpretation Centre to enter the National Park and Sanctuary.

== Tourism ==
Murti is a tourist spot located on the banks of the Murti river. It is visited by nature lovers and bird watchers. Murti is a tourist hub that lies in close proximity of the main forest gate of the Gorumara beat in Gorumara National Park. The place is used as a base for safari visits into the park. The jeep safari ticket counter is located by the Murti Banani - an eco-tourism resort operated by West Bengal Forest Development Corporation (WBFDC). Tourists staying in Murti can also experience Elephant safari from Dhupjhora Elephant Camp, located 5 km away. There are several private resorts and hotels in Murti but some tourists prefer to stay at Resort Trimurti because of its location. The Gorumara National Park has a range of wildlife. Wild animals like Gour (Indian bison), various types of deer including Spotted deer, Barking deer, Sambhars, wild elephants and many other animals including various species of birds are often sighted from the resorts and hotels located by the river Murti during the early morning and evening hours.

On crossing the Murti River, at a short walking distance, is a picnic spot on the banks of the Panijhora stream.
