= Dam Dim =

Dam Dim Damdimhat
- Village
- Location in West Bengal, India Dam Dim (India)
- Coordinates: 26.8656°N 88.6698°E
- Country: India 26.8656,88.6698
- State: West Bengal
- District: Jalpaiguri
- Elevation: 141 m (463 ft)
- Time zone: UTC+5:30 (IST)
- PIN: 735209
- Telephone code: 03562
- Vehicle registration: WB
- Coastline: 0 kilometres (0 mi)
- Nearest city: Siliguri
- Lok Sabha constituency: Jalpaiguri
- Avg. summer temperature: 32 °C (90 °F)
- Avg. winter temperature: 22 °C (72 °F)
- Website: wb.gov.in

Dam Dim (also referred to as Damdimhat) is a village in the Mal CD blocks in the Malbazar subdivision of the Jalpaiguri district, West Bengal, India. It is famous for tea gardens and moist deciduous forests.

== Geography ==
Places and tea estates in Malbabazar subdivision (including Mal, Nagrakata and Matiali CD blocks) in Jalpaiguri district
CT: census town, R: rural/ urban centre, N: neighbourhood, NP: national park/ wildlife sanctuary, TE: tea estate
Abbreviations used in names – TG for Tea Garden (town/village), TE for Tea Estate, JRS: junction railway station
Owing to space constraints in the small map, the actual locations in a larger map may vary slightly

=== Location ===
Dam Dim is located at 26.8656°N 88.6698°E at an elevation of 141 m above MSL.

=== Area overview ===
Gorumara National Park has overtaken traditionally popular Jaldapara National Park in footfall and Malbazar has emerged as one of the most important towns in the Dooars. Malbazar subdivision is presented in the map alongside. It is a predominantly rural area with 88.62% of the population living in rural areas and 11.32% living in the urban areas. Tea gardens in the Dooars and Terai regions produce 226 million kg or over a quarter of India's total tea crop. Some tea gardens were identified in the 2011 census as census towns or villages. Such places are marked in the map as CT (census town) or R (rural/ urban centre). Specific tea estate pages are marked TE.

Note: The map alongside presents some of the notable locations in the subdivision. All places marked in the map are linked in the larger full screen map.

=== Climate ===
The major seasons observed in this area are Winter, Spring, Summer and Rainy. The weather of the place remains pleasant throughout the year. Temperature hardly goes beyond 30^{o} Celsius in summers which lasts only for 2 – 3 months. Average rainfall is 400 cm. Winters get quite chilly but temperature never drops below freezing point during nights.

== Demographics ==
As per the 2011 Census of India, Damdimhat had a total population of 3,190. There were 1,625 (51%) males and 1,565 (49%) females. There were 343 persons in the age range of 0 to 6 years. The total number of literate people in Damdimhat was 2,408 (84.58% of the population over 6 years).

== Transport ==
Damdim Railway Station lies on the New Jalpaiguri-Alipurduar-Samuktala Road line.
