= Samsing =

Samsing Queen of Dooars
- Place where nature smiles
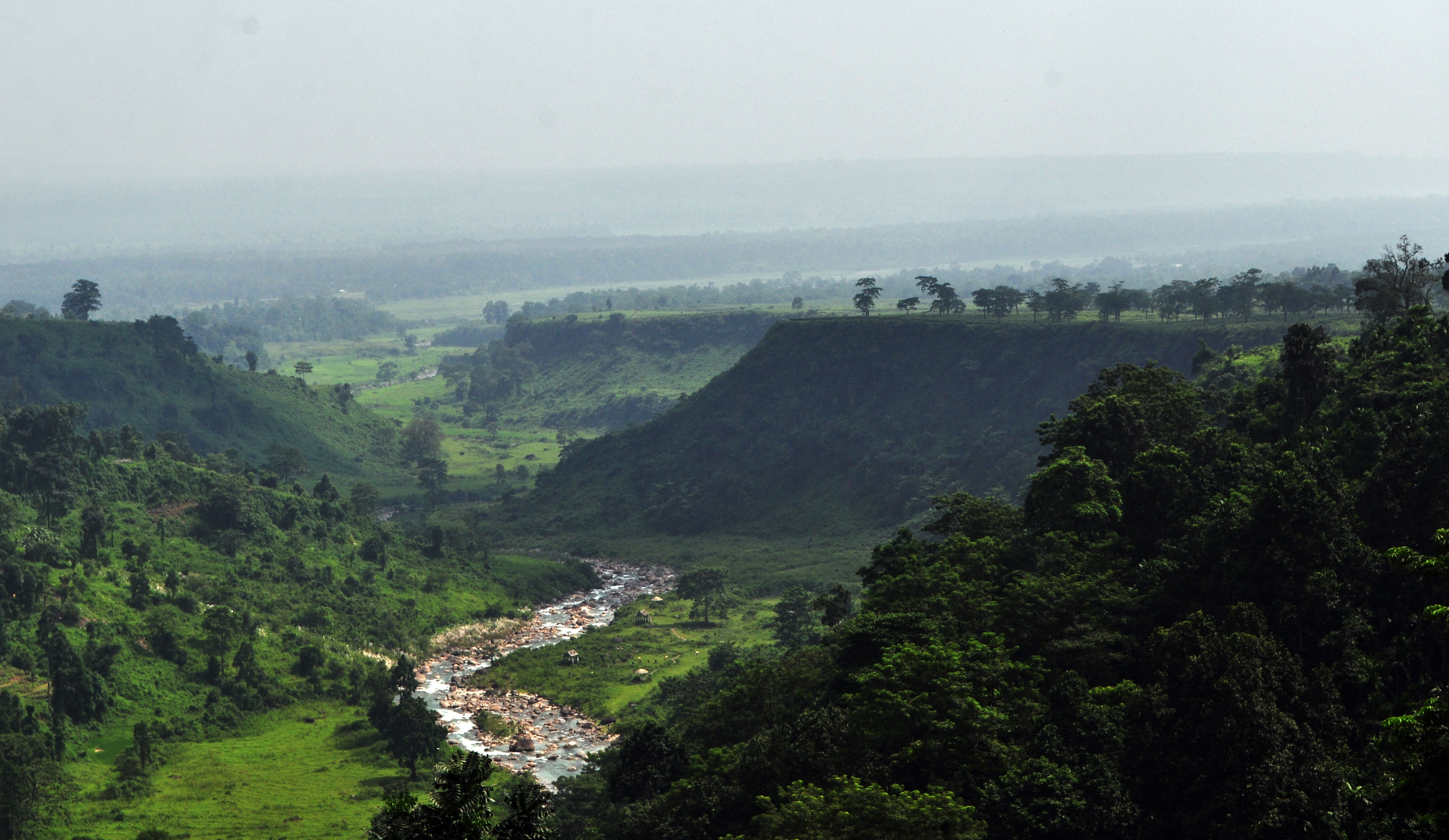
- Samsing Lali Gurash Picnic Spot

- Location in West Bengal, India Samsing (India)
- Coordinates: 26.9901°N 88.8117°E
- Country: India
- State: West Bengal
- District: Jalpaiguri/Darjeeling

Languages
  - Spoken: Lepcha, Nepali
- Time zone: UTC+5:30 (IST)
- Postal code: 735223

Samsing is a small hill village and tourist spot in the Matiali (community development block), Malbazar subdivision of Jalpaiguri district of West Bengal situated at an elevation of 3000 ft in the foothills in between Jalpaiguri and Darjeeling districts border.

== Geography ==
Places and tea estates in Malbabazar subdivision (including Mal, Nagrakata and Matiali CD blocks) in Jalpaiguri district
CT: census town, R: rural/ urban centre, N: neighbourhood, NP: national park/ wildlife sanctuary, TE: tea estate
Abbreviations used in names – TG for Tea Garden (town/village), TE for Tea Estate, JRS: junction railway station
Owing to space constraints in the small map, the actual locations in a larger map may vary slightly

=== Area overview ===
Gorumara National Park has overtaken traditionally popular Jaldapara National Park in footfall and Malbazar has emerged as one of the most important towns in the Dooars. Malbazar subdivision is presented in the map alongside. It is a predominantly rural area with 88.62% of the population living in rural areas and 11.32% living in the urban areas. Tea gardens in the Dooars and Terai regions produce 226 million kg or over a quarter of India's total tea crop. Some tea gardens were identified in the 2011 census as census towns or villages. Such places are marked in the map as CT (census town) or R (rural/ urban centre). Specific tea estate pages are marked TE.

Note: The map alongside presents some of the notable locations in the subdivision. All places marked in the map are linked in the larger full screen map.

=== The locality ===
It is known for its beautiful landscape with green tea garden scenery, hills and forests, which attract many tourists. On a clear day, the snow-clad mountains of Bhutan are also visible from this place. It lies 18 km from the Neora Valley National Park. It is the home of more than 4000 people. Its climate is noted for fog and cool breezes and a high rainfall. It has many beautiful picnic spots and tourist places. Some of them are Lali Guras, Rocky Island, Samsing Phari and Suntaley Khola. Neora Valley National Park is in a distance of an hour from here and has hills, plains, rivers, forest, tea-garden and villages. It is a tea garden inhabited by Paharhi and Madhesia people.

Samsing is divided into two parts; Samsing basti, which includes Khasmahal, Fari, Sundar Busty, Compound Busty, Bhujel Gaon and samsing tea garden. Samsing Tea Estate is under the administration of Jalpaiguri district and Samsing basti- comprises Sundar Basti, Khash Mahal and Fari are under Gorkhaland Territorial Administration. It has also three divisions:- top line, lower line and young tong division. The owners of the tea estate of Samsing were British companies. They divided the topline with Kurti line, New School line, Gumba Line, Kamal Bhawan line, MBP Line, SB LINE, PP Line, Munshi line and Junction line and Yongtong is divided with balka Line, Sahil bhujel line, Mochi Line, Basa Line, Narayan line, Sai line (which is also known as Gorup pura), Bari Line and Fagu Line. where each line are separated by small brook and Samsing has its local bus stand. Local people are mostly employed in tea garden and tourism, but many of the younger generation have migrated to bigger cities for greater opportunities.

== Education ==
Samsing Higher Sec. School, Gardenwood Academy, Sai Santi Niketan, Sai Grace Academy and Paradise English School are here.

== Social environment ==
The people here never actively participated in both the violent forms of Gorkhaland demand. After Vimal Gurung fled in 2017, Shri Binoy Tamang became the GTA chairman. Now the valley is peaceful and developing. The early settlers in this village worked as tea plantation labourers and were from Rangeli, Sikkim and Indo-Nepal Mountain (Madhesia) region. They left for this place when they heard that people pluck leaves from tea plants bearing money.

== Samsing Tea Estate ==
The management of Samsing tea estate declared suspension of work from 28 November 2005 affecting 1,360 workers. It is a large garden on the bank of the Murti river and is surrounded by the Chulsa tea garden and Matelli tea garden. In the beginning, the Duncan Company was running the garden followed by the Tea King Company in the 1980s. Then, in the 1990s, S. P. Agrawal Company took over the garden. The total land of the garden is 1200 hectares, of which 900 are plantation land.
