= Malbazar railway station =

Railway station in West Bengal, India

Malbazar Junction
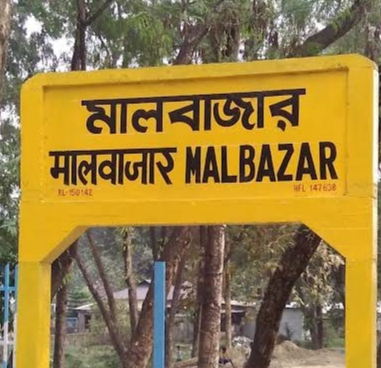
- Malbazar Railway Station Board

General information
- Location: Mal Bazar Old Rail Station, Mal Municipality, Dist - Jalpaiguri State: West Bengal; India
- Coordinates: 26.865794°N 88.737993°E
- Elevation: 150.00 metres (492.13 ft)
- System: Indian Railways Station
- Owner: Indian Railways
- Operator: Northeast Frontier Railway zone
- Line: New Mal–Changrabandha–New Cooch Behar line
- Platforms: 2
- Tracks: 3 (broad gauge)

Construction
- Structure type: At grade
- Parking: Available

Other information
- Status: Functioning
- Station code: MLBZ
- Zone(s): Northeast Frontier Railway zone
- Division(s): Alipurduar
Location
- Location within West Bengal Location within India

Malbazar Railway Station also known as Old Malbazar Railway Station is one of the railway station that serves the Municipality of Malbazar, Jalpaiguri district in the Indian state of West Bengal, the other being New Mal Junction. The station lies on New Mal–Changrabandha–New Cooch Behar line of Northeast Frontier Railway, Alipurduar railway division.

== Trains ==
Some local trains like

- "Siliguri Junction Bamanhat DEMU".
- "Siliguri Junction New Bongaigaon DEMU".

are available from this station. Other major trains are available from New Mal Junction railway station.
