= Matiali (community development block) =

- Community development block
- Coordinates: 26.9271590°N 88.8133049°E
- Country: India
- State: West Bengal
- District: Jalpaiguri

Area
  - Total: 204.90 km^{2} (79.11 sq mi)

Population (2011)
  - Total: 117,540
  - Density: 573.65/km^{2} (1,485.7/sq mi)

Languages
  - Official: Bengali, English
- Time zone: UTC+5:30 (IST)
- Lok Sabha constituency: Alipurduars
- Vidhan Sabha constituency: Nagrakata
- Website: jalpaiguri.gov.in

Matiali is a community development block (CD block) in the eastern Sivalik Hills that forms an administrative division in the Malbazar subdivision of the Jalpaiguri district in the Indian state of West Bengal.

== Geography ==
Matialihat is located at 26°55′38″N 88°48′48″E.

The Matiali CD block lies in the north-central part of the district. The Mal River flows through the CD block and along a portion of its western boundary. The Murti River flows along a portion of its eastern boundary. It has hilly terrain which is part of the sub-Himalayan ranges.

The Matiali CD block is bounded by the Gorubathan CD block in Kalimpong district on the north, Nagrakata CD block on the east, Maynaguri and Kranti CD blocks on the south, Mal CD block on the west.

The Matiali CD block has an area of 204.90 km^{2}. It has 1 panchayat samity, 5 gram panchayats, 81 gram sansads (village councils), 31 mouzas, 27 inhabited villages and 3 census towns. Mitiali police station serves this block. Headquarters of this CD block is at Chalsa Mahabari.

Gram panchayats of Matiali block/ panchayat samiti are: Bidhannagar, Indong Matiali, Matialihat, Matiali Batabari I and Matiali Batabari II.

== Demographics ==
=== Population ===
According to the 2011 Census of India, the Matiali CD block had a total population of 117,540, of which 102,418 were rural, and 15,122 were urban. There were 60,109 (51%) males and 57,431 (47%) females. There were 14,127 persons in the age range of 0 to 6 years. The Scheduled Castes numbered 17,622 (14.99%) and the Scheduled Tribes numbered 51,789 (44.06%).

According to the 2001 census, Matiali block had a total population of 105,861, out of which 53,465 were males and 52,396 were females. Matiali block registered a population growth of 13.52 per cent during the 1991-2001 decade.

Census towns in the Matiali CD block are (2011 census figures in brackets): Matialihat (4,215), Chalsa Mahabari (4,973) and Mangalbari (4,934).

Large villages (with 4,000+ population) in the Matiali CD block are (2011 census figures in brackets): Juranti Tea Garden (5,402), Aibhil Tea Garden (4,179), Nagaisuri Tea Garden (4,810), Chalauni Tea Garden (4,291), Samsing Tea Garden (6,713), Matiali Tea Garden (6,380), Chalsa Tea Garden (4,602), Indong Tea Garden (6,439), Kilkote Tea Garden (4,083), Sathkaya Tea Garden (4,528), Neora Majhiali (4,239), Salbari (9,115), Uttar Dhupjhora (4,342) and Bara Dighi Tea Garden (5,639).

Other villages in the Matiali CD block include (2011 census figures in brackets): Batabari Tea Garden (2,644).

=== Literacy ===
According to the 2011 census, the total number of literate persons in the Matiali CD block was 69,264 (66.98% of the population over 6 years) out of which males numbered 40,649 (76.76% of the male population over 6 years) and females numbered 28,615 (56.71% of the female population over 6 years). The gender disparity (the difference between female and male literacy rates) was 20.05%.

See also – List of West Bengal districts ranked by literacy rate

Literacy in CD blocks of
Jalpaiguri district
Jalpaiguri Sadar subdivision
Rajganj – 62.82%
Jalpaiguri – 73.81%
Maynaguri – 75.63%
Dhupguri – 60.57%
Malbazar subdivision
Mal – 66.31
Matiali – 66.98%
Nagrakata – 61.27%
Alipurduar subdivision
Madarihat-Birpara – 67.77%
Kalchini – 68.96%
Kumargram – 72.42%
Alipurduar I – 78.19%
Alipurduar II – 75.76%
Falakata – 72.64%
2011 Census: CD Block Wise

Primary Census Abstract Data

=== Language and religion ===
Religion in Matiali CD block (2011)
Hinduism	78.02%
Islam	11.08%
Christianity	8.02%
Buddhism	1.50%
Tribal religion	1.14%
Other or not stated	0.25%

In the 2011 Census of India, Hindus numbered 91,699 and formed 78.02% of the population of Matiali CD block. Muslims numbered 13,022 and formed 11.08% of the population. Christians numbered 9,425 and formed 8.02% of the population. Others numbered 3,394 and formed 2.89% of the population. Others include Addi Bassi, Marang Boro, Santal, Saranath, Sari Dharma, Sarna, Alchchi, Bidin, Sant, Saevdharm, Seran, Saran, Sarin, Kheria, and other religious communities.

Languages of Matiali CD block (2011)
1. Sadri (41.2%)
2. Bengali (23.3%)
3. Nepali (14.1%)
4. Hindi (4.50%)
5. Mundari (4.38%)
6. Santali (2.66%)
7. Kurukh (1.67%)
8. Others (8.13%)

At the time of the 2011 census, 41.23% of the population spoke Sadri, 23.31% Bengali, 14.12% Nepali, 4.50% Hindi, 4.38% Mundari, 2.66% Santali and 1.67% Kurukh as their first language. 1.41% of the population spoke languages classified as 'Others', including Toto.

== Poverty level ==
Based on a study of the per capita consumption in rural and urban areas, using central sample data of NSS 55th Round 1999-2000, Jalpaiguri district was found to have relatively high rates of poverty of 35.73% in rural areas and 61.53% in the urban areas. It was one of the few districts where urban poverty rate was higher than the rural poverty rate.

According to a World Bank report, as of 2012, 26-31% of the population of Jalpaiguri, Bankura and Paschim Medinipur districts were below poverty line, a relatively high level of poverty in West Bengal, which had an average 20% of the population below poverty line.

== Economy ==
=== Livelihood ===
Livelihood
in Matiali CD block
1. Cultivators (4.77%)
2. Agricultural labourers (10.8%)
3. Household industries (1.43%)
4. Other Workers (83.0%)

In the Matiali CD block in 2011, among the class of total workers, cultivators numbered 2,392 and formed 4.77%, agricultural labourers numbered 5,402 and formed 10.76%, household industry workers numbered 717 and formed 1.43% and other workers numbered 41,685 and formed 83.04%. Total workers numbered 50,196 and formed 42.71% of the total population, and non-workers numbered 67,344 and formed 57.29% of the population.

Note: In the census records a person is considered a cultivator, if the person is engaged in cultivation/ supervision of land owned by self/government/institution. When a person who works on another person's land for wages in cash or kind or share, is regarded as an agricultural labourer. Household industry is defined as an industry conducted by one or more members of the family within the household or village, and one that does not qualify for registration as a factory under the Factories Act. Other workers are persons engaged in some economic activity other than cultivators, agricultural labourers and household workers. It includes factory, mining, plantation, transport and office workers, those engaged in business and commerce, teachers, entertainment artistes and so on.

=== Infrastructure ===
There are 27 inhabited villages in the Matiali CD block, as per the District Census Handbook, Jalpaiguri, 2011. 100% villages have power supply. 100% villages have drinking water supply. 4 villages (14.81%) have post offices. 25 villages (92.51%) have telephones (including landlines, public call offices and mobile phones). 22 villages (81.48%) have pucca (paved) approach roads and 19 villages (70.37%) have transport communication (includes bus service, rail facility and navigable waterways). 1 village (3.70%) has a bank.

=== Agriculture ===
The economy of the Jalpaiguri district is mainly dependent on agriculture and plantations, and majority of the people are engaged in agriculture. Jalpaiguri is well-known for tea and timber. Other important crops are paddy, jute, tobacco, mustard seeds, sugarcane and wheat. The annual average rainfall is 3,440 mm, around double of that of Kolkata and the surrounding areas. The area is flood prone and the rivers often change course causing immense damage to crops and cultivated lands.

In 2013-14, there were 14 fertiliser depots, 3 seed stores and 16 fair price shops in the Matiali CD block.

In 2013–14, the Matiali CD block produced 4,724 tonnes of Aman paddy, the main winter crop, from 2,710 hectares, 86 tonnes of Boro paddy (spring crop) from 39 hectares, 847 tonnes of Aus paddy (summer crop) from 412 hectares, 249 tonnes of wheat from 133 hectares, 256 tonnes of maize from 120 hectares, 2,654 tonnes of jute from 290 hectares and 4,210 tonnes of potatoes from 240 hectares. It also produced pulses and oilseeds.

In 2013-14, the total area irrigated in the Matiali CD block was 2,128 hectares, out of which 1,543 hectares were irrigated by canal water, 25 hectares by tank water and 660 hectares by river lift irrigation

=== Dooars-Terai tea gardens ===
Tea gardens in the Dooars and Terai regions produce 226 million kg or over a quarter of India's total tea crop.. The Dooars-Terai tea is characterized by a bright, smooth and full-bodied liquor that's a wee bit lighter than Assam tea. Cultivation of tea in the Dooars was primarily pioneered and promoted by the British but there was significant contribution of Indian entrepreneurs.

=== Banking ===
In 2013-14, Matiali CD block had offices of 3 commercial banks and 1 gramin bank.

=== Backward Regions Grant Fund ===
The Jalpaiguri district is listed as a backward region and receives financial support from the Backward Regions Grant Fund. The fund, created by the Government of India, is designed to redress regional imbalances in development. As of 2012, 272 districts across the country were listed under this scheme. The list includes 11 districts of West Bengal.

== Transport ==
Matiali CD block has 1 ferry services and 4 originating/ terminating bus routes.

NH 31 and NH 31C pass through the block.

== Education ==
In 2013-14, Matiali CD block had 69 primary schools with 7,270 students, 7 middle schools with 1,165 students, 2 high schools with 1,776 students and 5 higher secondary schools with 7,383 students. Matiali CD block had 307 institutions for special and non-formal education with 15,486 students.

See also – Education in India

According to the 2011 census, in the Matiali CD block, among the 27 inhabited villages, all villages had schools, 21 villages had two or more primary schools, 12 villages had at least 1 primary and 1 middle school and 6 villages had at least 1 middle and 1 secondary school.

== Healthcare ==
In 2014, Matiali CD block had 1 block primary health centre, 2 primary health centres and 3 NGO/ private nursing home with total 87 beds and 8 doctors (excluding private bodies). It had 22 family welfare subcentres. 3,327 patients were treated indoor and 92,082 patients were treated outdoor in the hospitals, health centres and subcentres of the CD block.

Mangalbari Block Primary Health Centre, with 15 beds at PO Chalsa, is the major government medical facility in the Matiali CD block. There are primary health centres at Indong Metali (with 6 beds), Mathachulka (with 10 beds).
