= Chapramari Wildlife Sanctuary =

Wildlife reserve in northern West Bengal, India

- IUCN category IV (habitat/species management area)
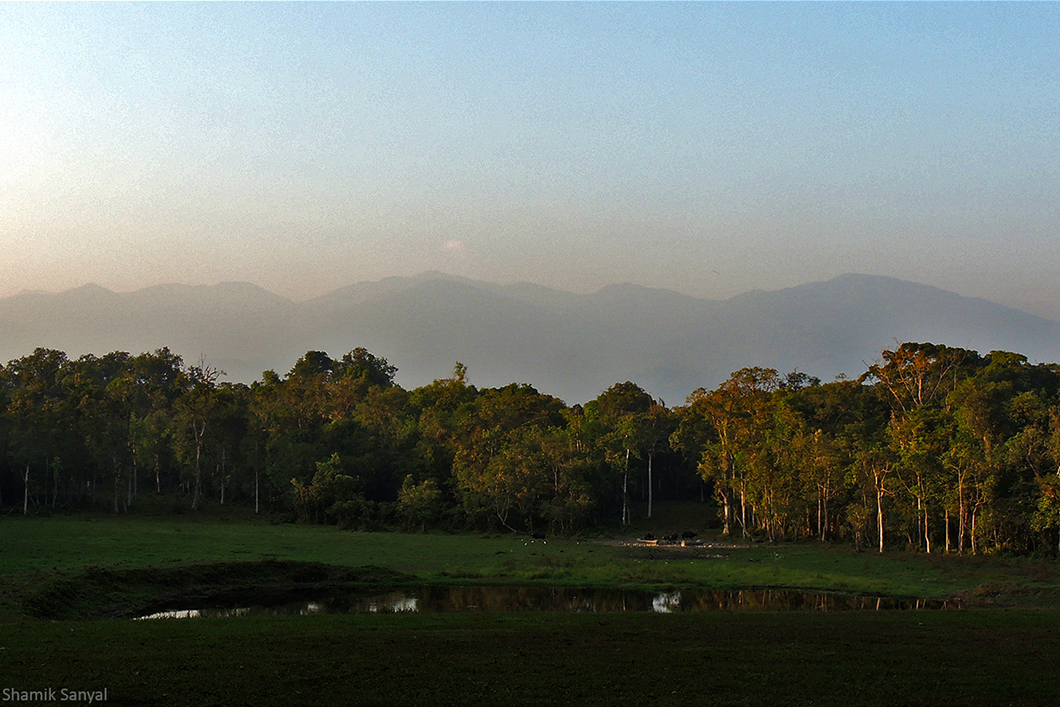
- View from Chapramari Watch tower.

- Location within West Bengal Location within India
- Interactive map of Chapramari Wildlife Sanctuary
- Location: Jalpaiguri district, West Bengal, India
- Nearest city: Malbazar, Mainaguri, Jalpaiguri
- Coordinates: 26.8746424°N 88.8551019°E
- Established: 1998
- Governing body: Government of India, Government of West Bengal

Chapramari Wildlife Sanctuary (formerly Chapramari Wildlife Reserve, pron: ˌʧʌprəˈmɑ:rɪ or ˌʧæprəˈmɑ:rɪ) is close to the Gorumara National Park. Chapramari is about 30 kilometres from Chalsa and Lataguri in northern West Bengal, India. The total coverage of the forest is 960 hectares.

== History ==
In 1896, an imperial forest-service administrator D.H.E. Sander first sent a proposal to the-then English-dominated Government of India that Chapramari could be developed into a tourism centre. The area was declared a national reserve forest in 1895 under the Indian Forest Act. In 1939, the name Chapramari Wildlife Reserve came to be used, while the Government of India, in 1998, gave it the status of a national wildlife sanctuary. The name of the region comes from 'Chapra', a variety of small fishes found in northern Bengal, and 'Mari', meaning 'abundance'. Chapramari receives waters from the Teesta, the Neora, Jaldhaka and the Murti.

== Wildlife ==
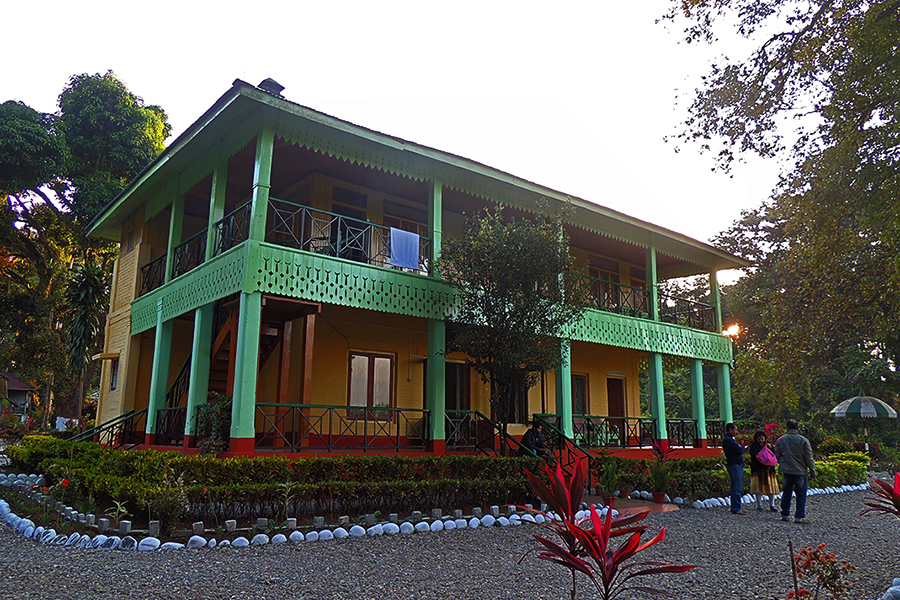

A large variety of flora and fauna are found in the forests. Chapramari is known for its elephant population. Gaur (commonly known as Indian bison) are not uncommon in the Chapramari region. Rhinoceros, Deer, boars, and leopards are also found here. However unlike Gorumara, Royal Bengal Tigers are not found here. The place is popular with bird watchers, with parakeets, kingfishers, and green pigeons found in abundance.

In 2009, a marauding leopard was captured in Dooars and released into Chapramari.

== Access ==
Malbazar Rail Station 15 kilometres away, is the closest major rail hub with Chalsa 7 km and Nagrakata 7.5 km the smaller ones. Chapramari is located around two hours' drive from Siliguri, the principal city in northern Bengal. The access from Jalpaiguri passes through the dense forests of Lataguri - Batabari range. National Highway 17 and Chalsa - Bindu -Jaldhaka - Todey Tangta Road passes through the middle of the Chapramari Wildlife Sanctuary.

Due to complications caused by monsoons, the wildlife sanctuary remains closed each year from mid-July to mid-September.

West Bengal Forest Development Corporation Limited operates a Chapramari camp.

== Threat to Elephants from Railway ==
The wildlife sanctuary is crossed by the New Jalpaiguri–Alipurduar–Samuktala Road Railway Line between Siliguri - Malbazar - Alipurduar. Elephants have been killed by trains in several incidents.

=== 2002 Train Accident ===
On 2002 February 8, Siliguri–Alipurduar Intercity Express train killed one female elephant and injured two tuskers.

=== 2010 Train Accident ===
An accident in which a goods train killed seven elephants in 2010 near Binnaguri led to a guideline speed of 40 km/h (25 mph) for trains being set by Indian Railways.

=== 2013 Train Accident ===
At approximately 17:40 on 13 November 2013, an Assam-bound passenger train travelling through Chapramari Wildlife Sanctuary, Jaipur-Kamakhya Kavi Guru Express (19709), approached the Jaldhaka River Bridge at approximately 80 km/h (50 mph) and collided with a herd of 40–50 Indian elephants, killing five adults, two calves, and injuring ten others. Surviving elephants initially fled but soon returned to the scene of the accident and remained there until being dispersed by officials.

The accident has been described as the worst in recent history. Officials plan to launch an investigation into its cause. The train's speed at the time of the collision, which was double that of the maximum specified by relevant guidelines, has been noted as one possible contributing factor. Minister of State for Railways Adhir Ranjan Chowdhury stated that the accident "happened outside the area which has been earmarked as elephant corridor" and that it "is the responsibility of the state government to protect the wildlife [because] railway officials cannot".

=== 2023 Train Accident ===
In 10 years later since Kavi Guru Express tragedy, in August 2023 a goods train bound for Chalsa knocked down a pregnant Elephant at pillar 68 of Chapramari Wildlife Sanctuary. The accident was so severe that the calf the mother elephant was carrying in her womb came out when the speeding goods train pierced through the pachyderm's belly. The elephant along with the unborn calf died on the spot. The wildlife experts and enthusiasts were in a state of shock when they heard the knocking down of the elephant by a speeding goods train.

== Photo gallery ==
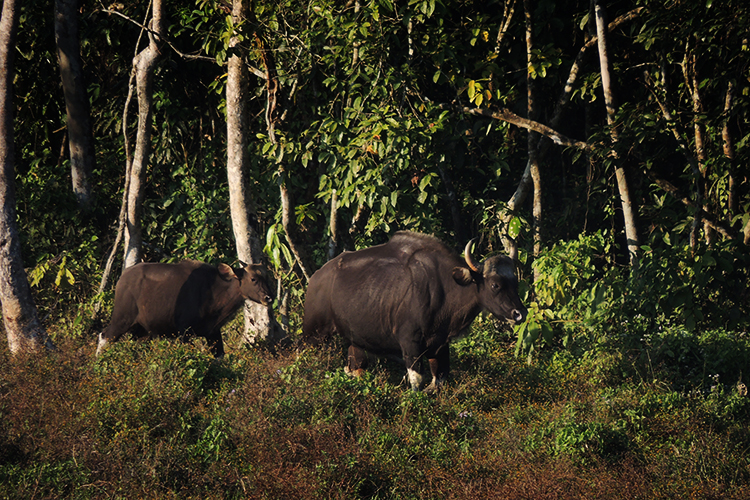
Gaur

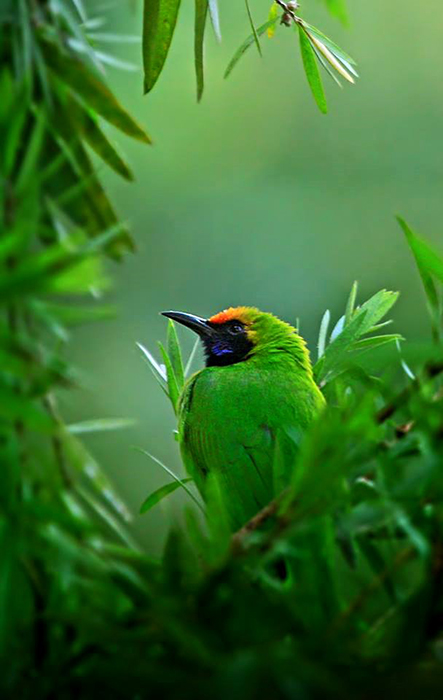
Golden-fronted leafbird

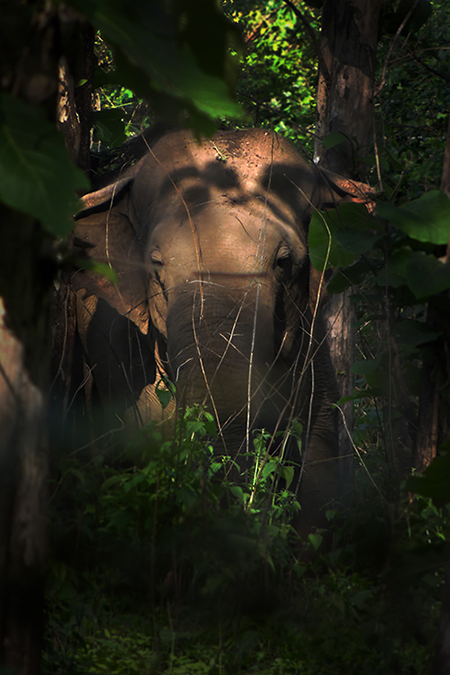
Elephas maximus

== See also ==
- Neora Valley National Park
- Gorumara National Park
- Mahananda Wildlife Sanctuary
- Pangolakha Wildlife Sanctuary
