= Chalsa, India =

Chalsa
- Census Town
- Location in West Bengal, India Chalsa (India)
- Coordinates: 26.88°N 88.78°E
- Country: India
- State: West Bengal
- District: Jalpaiguri
- Elevation: 163 m (535 ft)

Population
  - Total: 4,973

Languages
  - Official: Bengali, English
- Time zone: UTC+5:30 (IST)
- Vehicle registration: WB

Chalsa (also known as Chalsa Mahabari) is a census town in the Matiali CD block in the Malbazar subdivision of the Jalpaiguri district in West Bengal, India.

== Geography ==
Places and tea estates in Malbabazar subdivision (including Mal, Nagrakata and Matiali CD blocks) in Jalpaiguri district
CT: census town, R: rural/ urban centre, N: neighbourhood, NP: national park/ wildlife sanctuary, TE: tea estate
Abbreviations used in names – TG for Tea Garden (town/village), TE for Tea Estate, JRS: junction railway station
Owing to space constraints in the small map, the actual locations in a larger map may vary slightly

=== Location ===
Chalsa is located at 26.88°N 88.78°E. It has an average elevation of 163 metres (535 feet).

It situated at the foot of the Himalayas in the Duars. This small town is surrounded by hills, tea gardens, rivers and forests. One part of the town is surrounded by Gorumara National Park and other part with Chapramari Wildlife Sanctuary. Nearby forests are residence of a good collection of elephants and rhinos. It is situated on the way towards Birpara or Alipurduar from Siliguri via Malbazar. It takes around 1.5 hours from Siliguri both on road and railways. It is 60 km from Bagdogra airport.

According to the map of the Matiali CD block on page 165 in the District Census Handbook, Jalpaiguri, 2011 census, Chalsa Mahabari is shown as being the headquarters of the block and Matiali police station is shown as being located in Chalsa Mahabari.

=== Area overview ===
Gorumara National Park has overtaken traditionally popular Jaldapara National Park in footfall and Malbazar has emerged as one of the most important towns in the Dooars. Malbazar subdivision is presented in the map alongside. It is a predominantly rural area with 88.62% of the population living in rural areas and 11.32% living in the urban areas. Tea gardens in the Dooars and Terai regions produce 226 million kg or over a quarter of India's total tea crop. Some tea gardens were identified in the 2011 census as census towns or villages. Such places are marked in the map as CT (census town) or R (rural/ urban centre). Specific tea estate pages are marked TE.

Note: The map alongside presents some of the notable locations in the subdivision. All places marked in the map are linked in the larger full screen map.

== Civic administration ==
=== Police station ===
Mitiali police station has jurisdiction over the Matiali CD block.

=== CD block HQ ===
The headquarters of the Matiali CD block are located at Chalsa Mahabari.

== Demographics ==
According to the 2011 Census of India, Chalsa Mahabari had a total population of 4,973 of which 2,461 (49%) were males and 2,512 (51%) were females. There were 489 persons in the age range of 0 to 6 years. The total number of literate people in Chalsa Mahabari was 3,471 (77.41% of the population over 6 years).

== Transport ==
=== Roadways ===
Siliguri is the best starting point if someone wants to visit Chalsa. It (Siliguri) is connected by air (Bagdogra) from New Delhi, Guwahati, Chennai and Kolkata and by rail (New Jalpaiguri) from Delhi, Guwahati, Kolkata. Via road, it is about 10 hours from Kolkata. Chapramari Sanctuary and Gorumara National Park are an hour and half away from Siliguri. Chalsa is surrounded by these two forests mentioned earlier.. Road and rail transport are the most preferred choices.

=== Railway ===
Chalsa Railway Station is on the New Jalpaiguri-Alipurduar-Samuktala Road Line serves the town of Chalsa and nearby areas.

== Tourism ==
Various resorts and lodges around Gorumara. The Forest department has two bungalows each at Chapramari and Gorumara. There should be prior booking to avail these bungalows. There are also many cottages, resorts all around Garumara national park. They are mainly at Chalsa, Lataguri and Dhupjhora. Book your places to stay prior to arrival.

== Chalsa picture gallery ==
Jungle at Chalsa

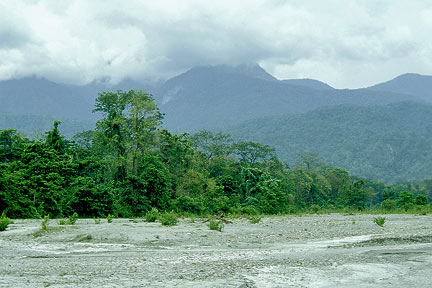
Hilly Chalsa
