= Malbazar =

Malbazar Mal
- Town
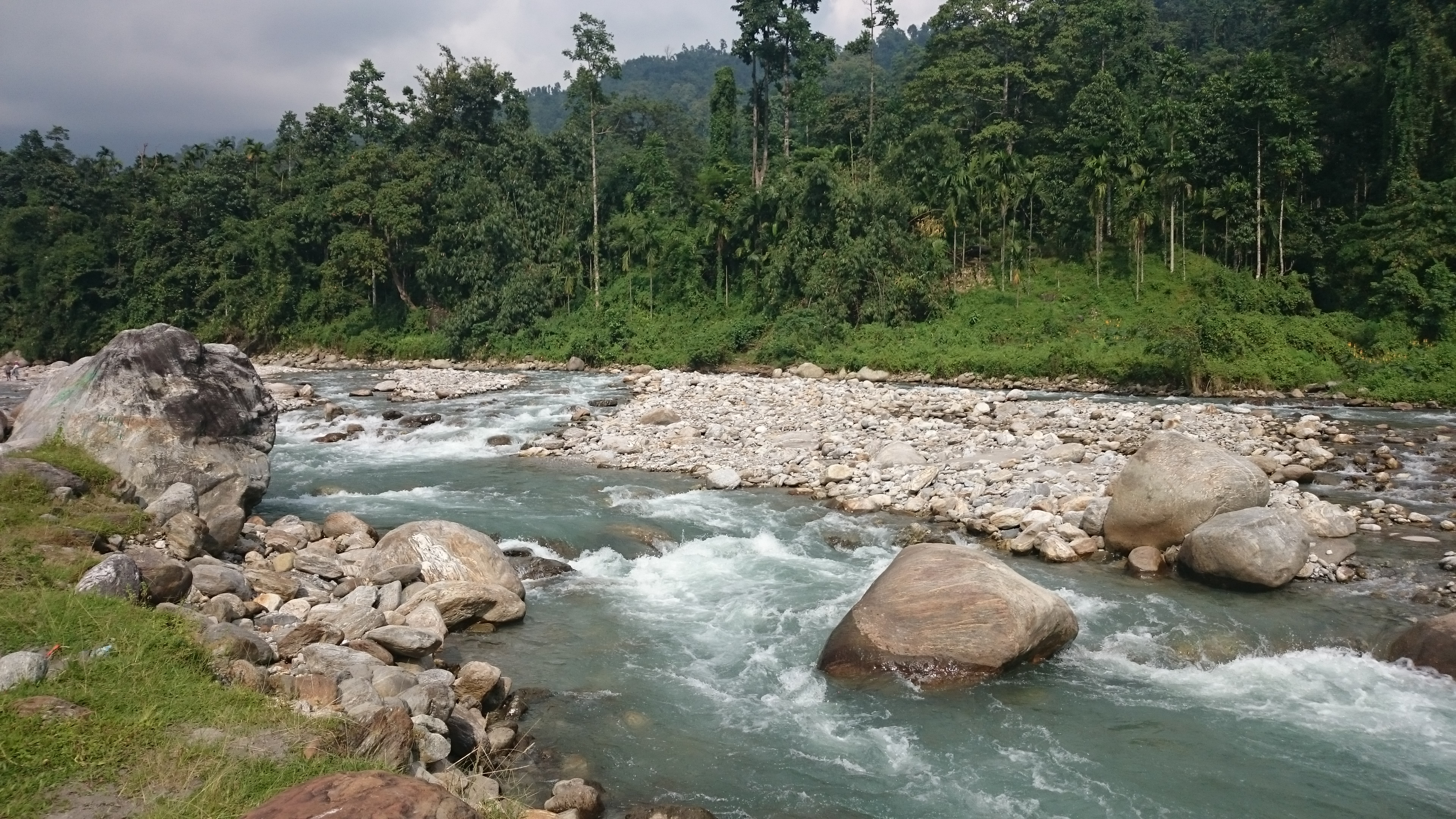

- Location in West Bengal, India Malbazar (India) Malbazar (Asia)
- Coordinates: 26.85°N 88.75°E
- Country: India
- State: West Bengal
- District: Jalpaiguri

Government
  - Type: Municipality; Panchayat Samiti
  - Body: Malbazar Municipality; Malbazar Panchayat Samiti
  - Municipality Chairperson: Utpal Bhadhury
  - Sabhapati: Shusil Kumar Prasad

Area
  - Total: 3.50 km^{2} (1.35 sq mi)

Population (2011)
  - Total: 25,218
  - Density: 9,851/km^{2} (25,510/sq mi)

Languages
  - Official: Bengali
  - Additional official: English
- Time zone: UTC+5:30 (IST)
- PIN: 735221
- Sex ratio: 950/968 ♂/♀
- Lok Sabha constituency: Jalpaiguri (SC)
- Vidhan Sabha constituency: Mal (ST)
- Literacy rate: 88.68%
- Website: www.malmunicipality.org

Malbazar, also known as Mal, is a town and a municipality in Jalpaiguri district in the state of West Bengal, India. It is the headquarters of the Malbazar subdivision. It lies about 65 km from Jalpaiguri and 55 km from Siliguri. It lies on the bank of river Neora.

== History ==
Before 1947 Malbazar was a very small place, mainly known for its tea gardens mostly owned by British people. Those tea gardens had a few Bengali white collar employees and the work force consisted of tribal people.

After independence of India as well as partition of Bengal refugees from the then East Pakistan (now Bangladesh) started to settle here by cutting down forests. By that time, Narayan Chandra Bannerjee, Dr Amalendu Biswas (came from Pabna), Debaprasad Ghosh(Patal Babu), Dr Tarak Mukherjee, Nripendra nath Choudhary who came there from Dhaka established this city.

== Geography ==
Places and tea estates in Malbabazar subdivision (including Mal, Nagrakata and Matiali CD blocks) in Jalpaiguri district
CT: census town, R: rural/ urban centre, N: neighbourhood, NP: national park/ wildlife sanctuary, TE: tea estate
Abbreviations used in names – TG for Tea Garden (town/village), TE for Tea Estate, JRS: junction railway station
Owing to space constraints in the small map, the actual locations in a larger map may vary slightly

=== Location ===
Mal is at 26.85°N 88.75°E.

Malbazar is one of the more important towns in Dooars. It is strategically located in the eastern part of the Dooars region. The town itself is rather an economical hub and a doorway to Dooars than being a tourist spot. tourist destination of Eastern Dooars – Gorumara National Park, Chapramari Wildlife Reserve, Jhalong, Bindu, Samsing, Suntalekhola etc. could be accessed through the town.

There is a government tourist lodge in Malbazar apart from a few private accommodations. An annual flower show is held, visited by people from places far and near.

=== Area overview ===
Gorumara National Park has overtaken traditionally popular Jaldapara National Park in footfall and Malbazar has emerged as one of the most important towns in the Dooars. Malbazar subdivision is presented in the map alongside. It is a predominantly rural area with 88.62% of the population living in rural areas and 11.32% living in the urban areas. Tea gardens in the Dooars and Terai regions produce 226 million kg or over a quarter of India's total tea crop. Some tea gardens were identified in the 2011 census as census towns or villages. Such places are marked in the map as CT (census town) or R (rural/ urban centre). Specific tea estate pages are marked TE.

Note: The map alongside presents some of the notable locations in the subdivision. All places marked in the map are linked in the larger full screen map.

== Demographics ==
According to the 2011 Census of India, Mal had a total population of 25,218 of which 12,814 (51%) were males and 12,404 (49%) were females. There were 1,161 persons in the age range of 0 to 6 years. The total number of literate people in Mal was 20,354 (84.61% of the population over 6 years).

In the 2001 census, Malbazar had a population of 23,212 out of which 12,111 were males and 11,101 were females. Decadal growth for the period 1991–2001 was 13.81% for Malbazar, against 21.52% in Jalpaiguri district. Decadal growth in West Bengal was 17.84%.

=== Languages ===
Languages spoken in Mal Town (2011)
1. Bengali (64.1%)
2. Hindi (16.4%)
3. Bhojpuri (5.65%)
4. Nepali (5.53%)
5. Sadri (3.68%)
6. Others (4.61%)

Bengali is the most spoken language of the town, followed significant number of Hindi, Bhojpuri, Nepali and Sadri speakers.

== Government and politics ==
The chairperson of Mal Municipality is Swapan Saha and vice chairperson is Utpal Bhaduri.

== Transport ==
=== Railway ===
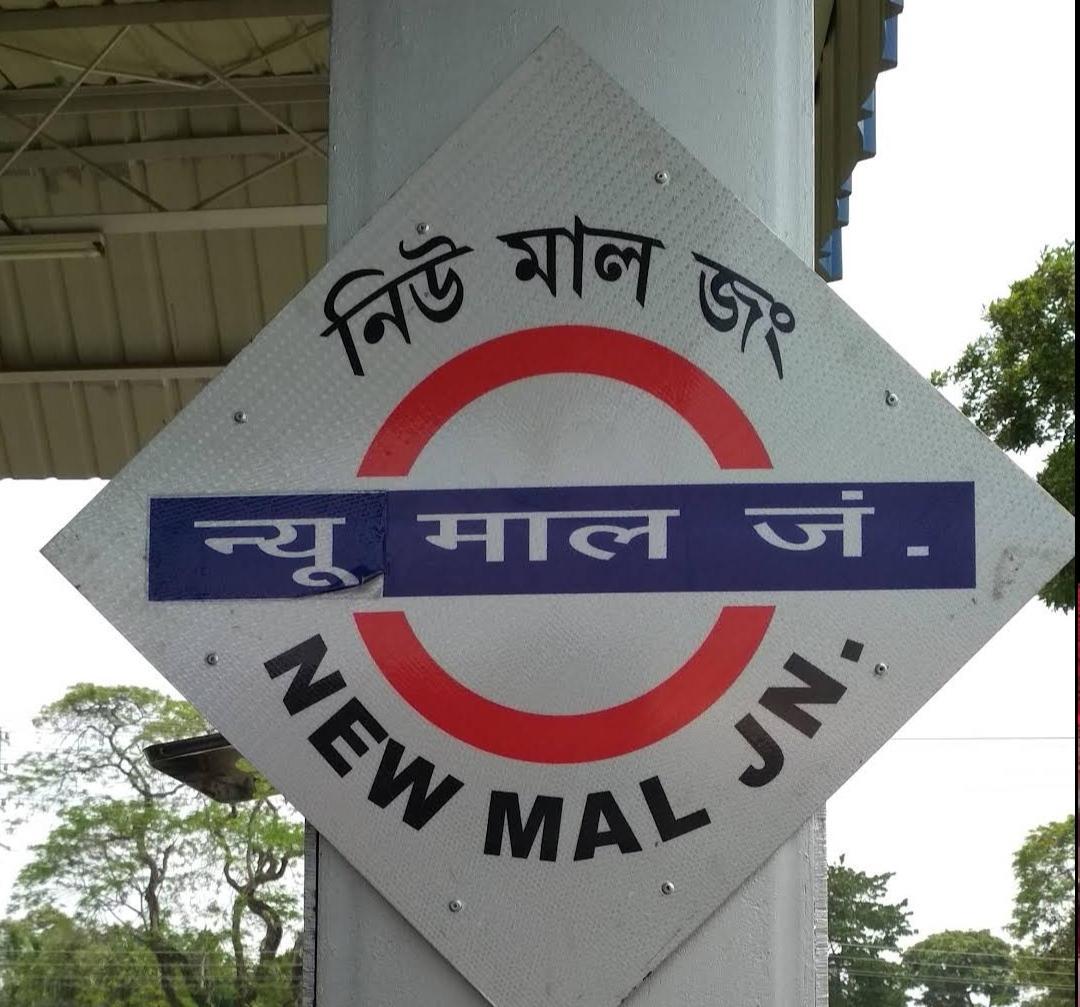
New Malbazar Junction railway station

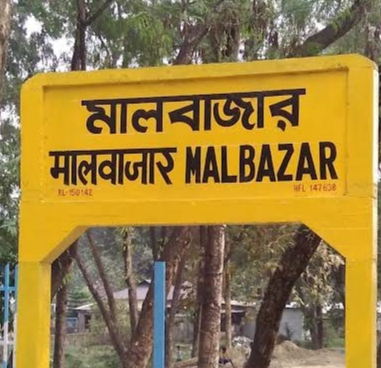
Old Malbazar Railway Station Board

There are two Railway Stations which serves Malbazar, they are Malbazar Railway Station (station code MLBZ) and New Mal Junction (station code NMZ).Malbazar railway station (MLBZ) is a small station where only local and DEMU trains are available whereas New Mal Junction is the major junction from where many Express trains, Intercity trains, and local trains are available. New Mal Junction is connected by the newly converted Broad Gauge of the New Jalpaiguri–Alipurduar–Samuktala line, whereas Malbazar Railway Station lies on New Mal–Changrabandha–New Cooch Behar line. The 1st railway line leads from the forests of North Bengal to the foothills near the India - Bhutan border, whereas the 2nd railway line originates from Malbazar and terminates in Changrabandha, which lies in India - Bangladesh border.

=== Roadways ===
Malbazar is well connected by road with cities like Siliguri and Jalpaiguri. Since it lies on the route towards Jaigaon, so Jeep/Taxi services are available towards Jaigaon, Hasimara, Birpara, Binnaguri, Gangtok, Kalimpong, Rangpo, Singtam, Jorethang, Pakyong, Namchi, Pelling, Darjeeling, Panitanki, Bagdogra, Mainaguri, Dhupguri, Falakata, Jalpaiguri, Alipurduar, Cooch Behar etc. Some long distance buses connecting Siliguri to Guwahati, Shillong, Jorhat etc also runs via Malbazar. Malbazar became popular to tourists as a gateway to many more spots like Gorumara, Chapramari and Chalsa. There is a short route between Malbazar to hill stations like Labha, Algarah, Pedong, Kalimpong, Rhenock, Mansong, Aritar via Gorubathan by State Highway 12 and National Highway 717A.

Frequent Bus services are available from Malbazar to P.C. Mittal Memorial Bus Terminus, Siliguri.

Also many buses are available from the town to Birpara, Hasimara, Jaigaon, Cooch Behar, Alipurduar, Dhupguri, Jalpaiguri etc.

=== Airways ===
The nearest airport is Bagdogra International Airport 74 kilometres away. Vistara, IndiGo, Go First, Akasa Air, AIX Connect, Air India, SpiceJet and Druk Air (Bhutan) are the major carriers that connects Bagdogra Airport to Chennai, Bangalore, Ahmedabad, Hyderabad, Mumbai, Delhi, Paro (Bhutan), Guwahati, Kolkata, Dibrugarh and Bangkok (Thailand).

== Education ==
- Caesar School (CBSE, English)(H.S.)
- Parimal Mitra Smriti Mahavidyalaya
