= Gorumara National Park =

National park in northern West Bengal, India

- IUCN category II (national park)
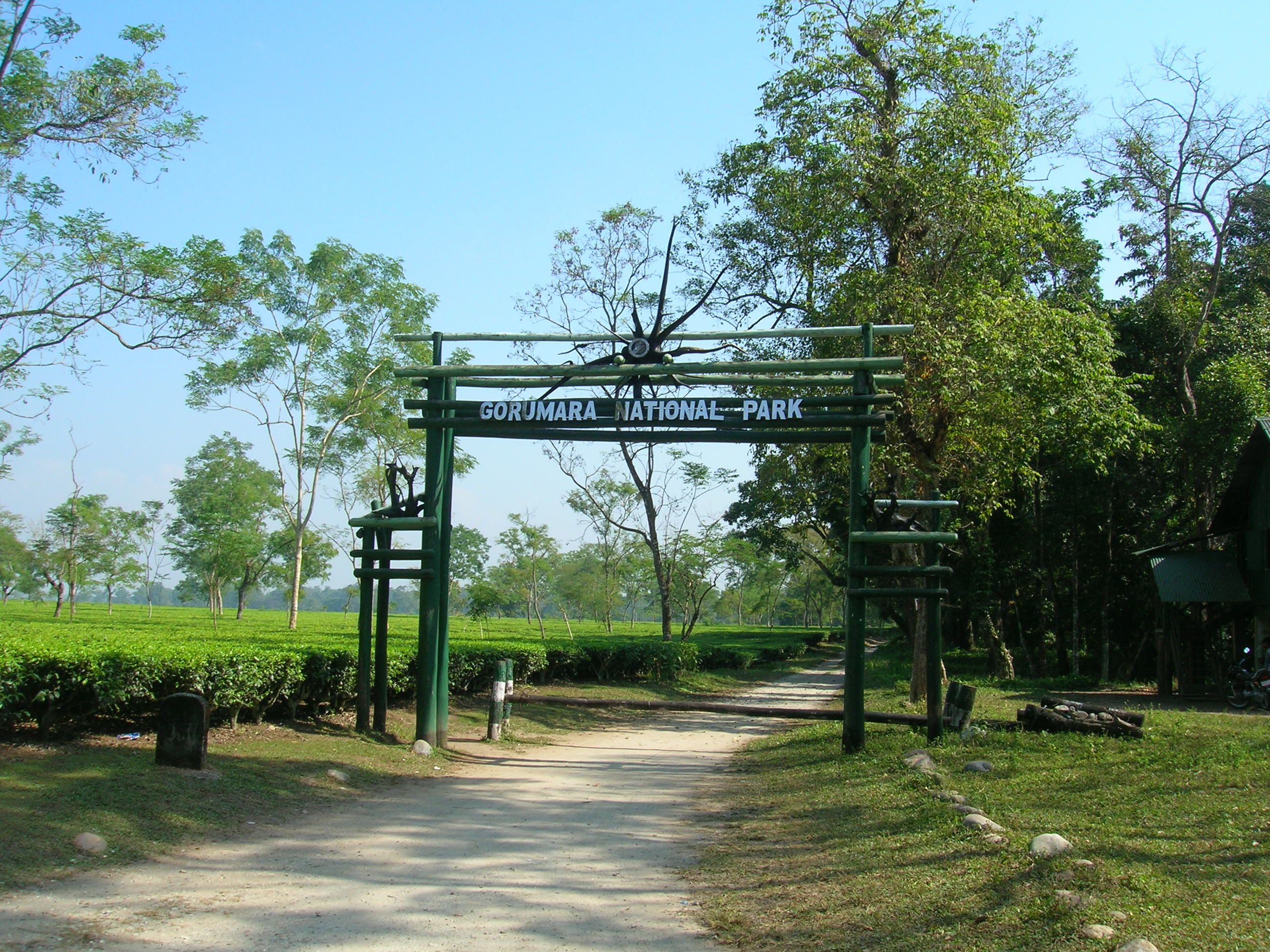
- Entrance to Gorumara National Park

- Location within West Bengal Location within India
- Interactive map of Gorumara National Park
- Location: Jalpaiguri district, West Bengal, India
- Nearest city: Malbazar, Jalpaiguri
- Coordinates: 26.7°N 88.8°E
- Governing body: Government of India, Government of West Bengal

Gorumara National Park (Pron: ˌgɔ:rʊˈmɑ:rə; Gorumara Jatio Uddan) is a national park in northern West Bengal, India. Located in the Dooars region of the Himalayan foothills, it is a medium-sized park with grasslands and forests. Gorumara National Park was established in 1992. It is primarily known for its population of Indian rhinoceros. The park was declared as the best among the protected areas in India by the Ministry of Environment and Forests for the year 2009.

As of March 2021, the park is open for the tourists after staying closed for months due to the COVID-19 pandemic.

== History ==
Having been a reserve forest since 1895, Gorumara was declared as a Wildlife Sanctuary in 1949, on account of its breeding population of Indian rhinoceros. It was granted official status as an Indian National Park on 31 January 1992. Originally the park was as small as 7 km^{2}. Since then Gorumara has grown by incorporating neighbouring lands to about 80 km^{2}.

== Geography ==
=== Political geography ===
The park is located in the Malbazar subdivision of Jalpaiguri district, in the state of West Bengal in India.

=== Physical geography ===
Gorumara is located in the Eastern Himalayas' submontane Terai belt. This region has rolling forests and riverine grasslands, and is known as the Dooars in West Bengal. The park is located on the flood plains of the Murti River and Raidak River. The major river of the park is the Jaldhaka river, a tributary of the Brahmaputra river system. In this regard, Gorumara is a significant watershed area between the Ganges and Brahmaputra river systems. The park is very close to Jaldapara National Park and Chapramari Wildlife Reserve.

The park is 79.99 km^{2} (30.88 sq mi) in area.

=== Climate ===
The temperature ranges from 10 to 21 °C (50 to 70 °F) from November to February, 24 to 27 °C (75 to 81 °F) from March to April and 27 to 37 °C (81 to 99 °F) from May to October. Rainfall mostly occurs between mid-May to mid-October and average annual rainfall is 382 cm (150 in).

== History ==
The park forest bungalow dates back to the British Raj era, and contains a well-maintained log book from its inception, which makes for interesting reading. However Gorumara is encircled by many ethnic villages. More than 10,000 resident forest villagers derive their income from sources including employment in forest department activities, ecotourism, etc. Some of the villages are Sarswati, Budhuram, Bichabhanga, Chatua, Kailipur and Murti Forest Village.

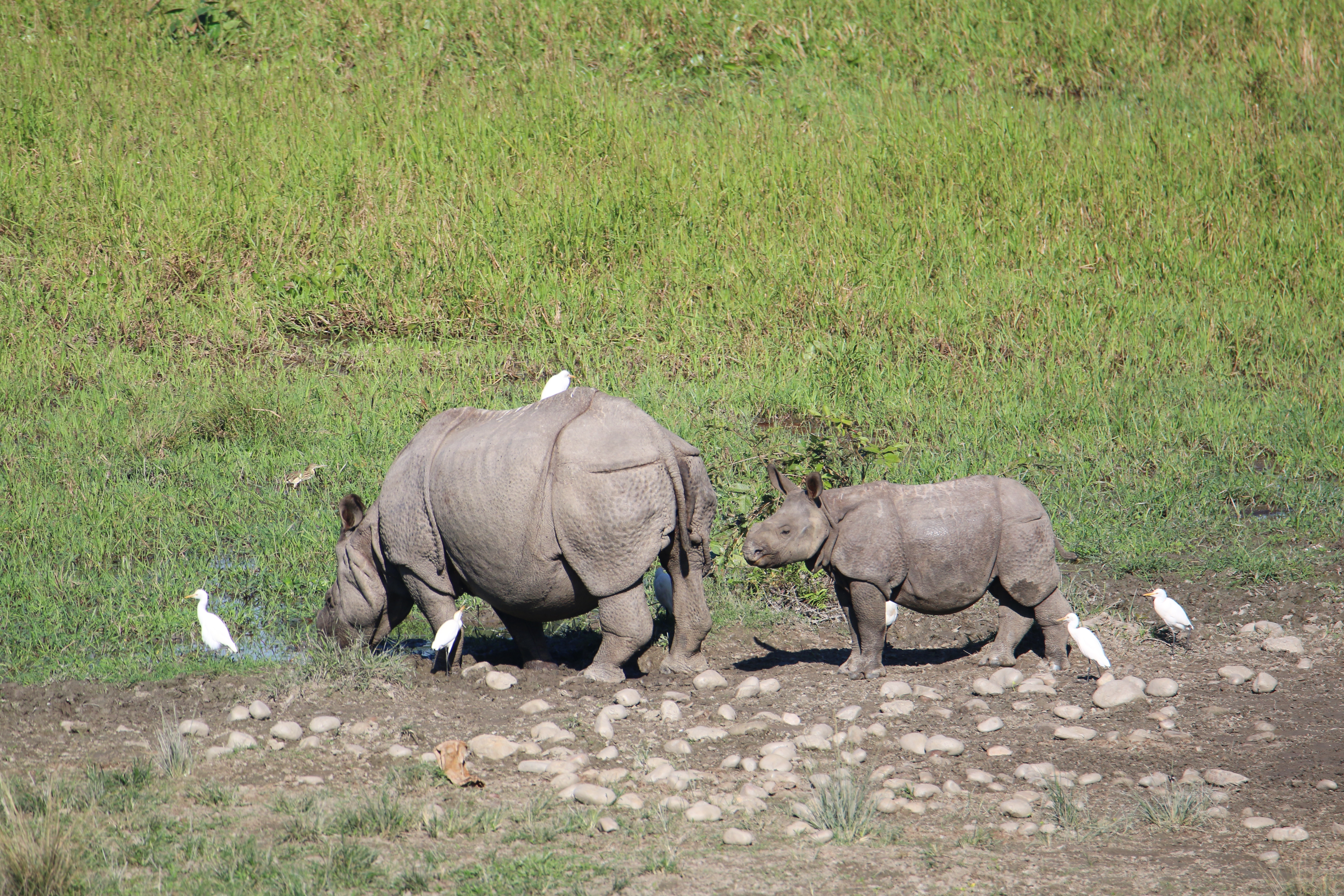
Baby with Mother Rhino near Medla watch tower

== Wildlife ==
=== Biomes ===
The park falls in the Indomalayan realm. Inside the park, the primary ecoregions and their corresponding to the biomes are:

- Terai-Duar savanna and grasslands of the tropical and subtropical grasslands, savannas, and shrublands biome
- Lower Gangetic Plains moist deciduous forests of the tropical and subtropical moist broadleaf forests biome

Both of these are typical of the Bhutan–Nepal–India Terai submontane region.

=== Flora ===
Typical flora include:

- Sal forests with common teak, rain tree (Shirish or Albizia saman lebbeck), and Bombax (also known as silk cotton tree or Shimul)
- Bamboo groves, terai grassland vegetation and tropical riverine reeds

Gorumara is home to numerous tropical orchids.

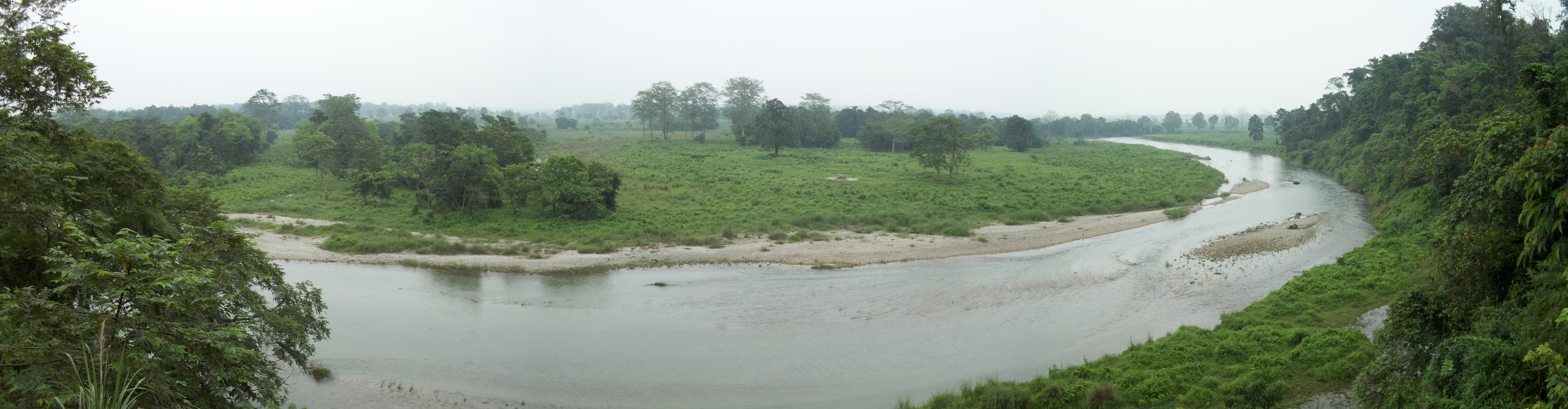
Gorumara National Park Panorama

=== Fauna ===
The park has recorded fifty species of mammals, 194 species of birds, 22 species of reptiles, 7 species of turtles, 27 species of fish, and other macro and micro fauna.

==== Mammals ====
The park is rich in large herbivores including Indian rhinoceros, gaur, Asian elephant, sloth bear, chital, and sambar deer. Small herbivores include barking deer, hog deer and wild boar. There is a comparative lack of large carnivores, with the only big cat being the leopard. The park is not home to any resident population of Bengal tigers, Indian wild dogs, or Indian wolves. Tigers are, however, occasionally spotted here. It does have numerous small carnivores including various civets, mongooses and small cats. The park has a large resident population of wild boar, but the critically endangered pygmy hog has been reported from the park. It also has numerous rodents, including giant squirrels. The rare hispid hare has also been reported from the park.

==== Birds ====
Birds at the Gorumara National Park include submontane forest species like the scarlet minivet, sunbird, asian paradise flycatchers, spangled drongo, and Indian hornbill. Numerous woodpeckers and pheasants inhabit the park. Peafowls are very common. The park is on the flyway of migratory birds including the rare brahminy duck.

==== Reptiles and amphibians ====
The park is home to a wide variety of snake species, venomous and non-venomous, including the famous Indian python, and the king cobra.

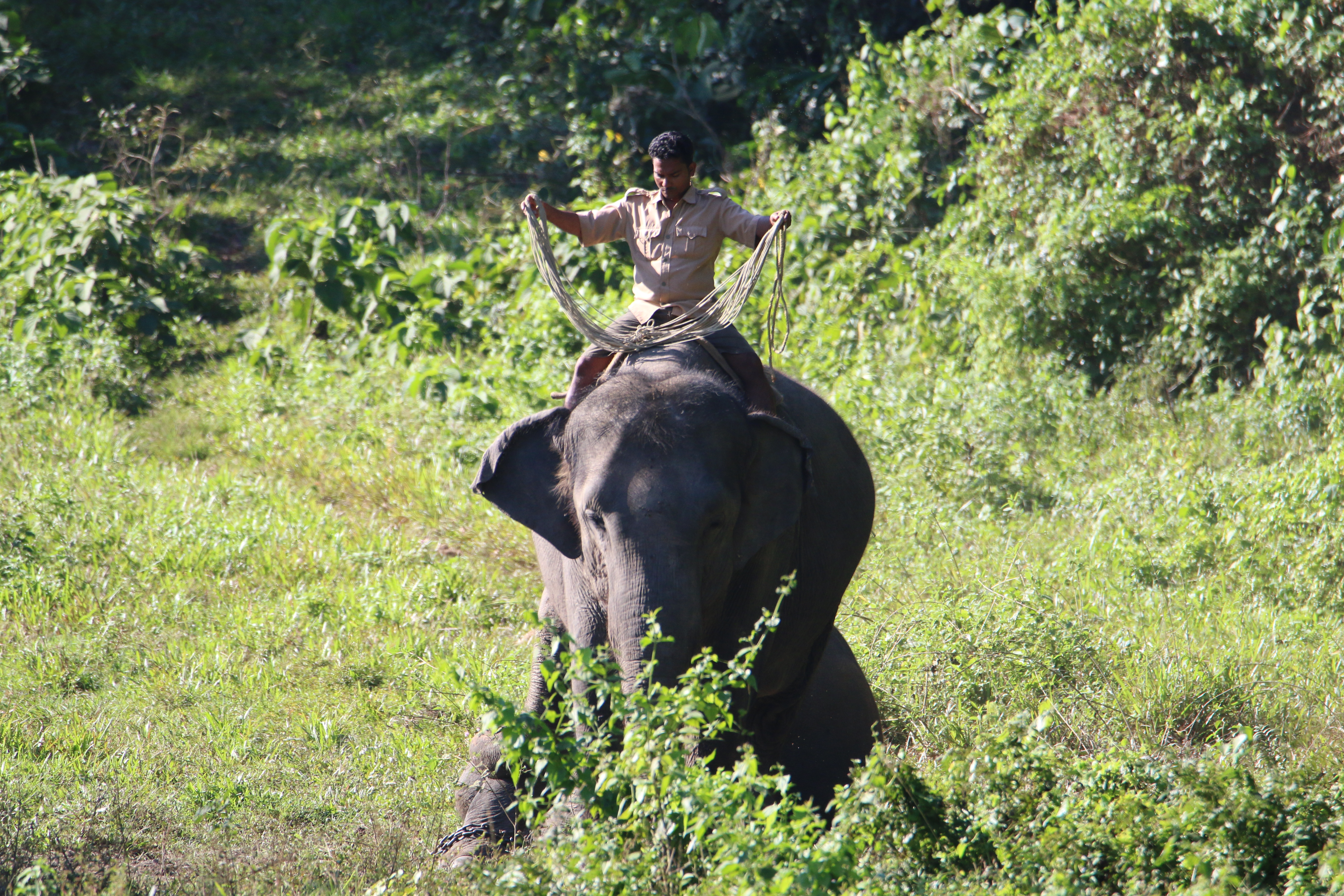
Kumki Elephant of West Bengal Forest Department at Ramsai

== Conservation issues ==
The major conservation focus of the park is to maintain a viable breeding community of Indian rhinoceroses. However, the lack of large predators has caused significantly worrying skews in the populations of large herbivores in the park. The rhinoceros male:female ratio, usually 1:3, shot up to 1:1 – resulting in male dominance fights and deaths. The gaur population also doubled in recent years, with risk of overgrazing.

Poaching was a major issue in the park in the 1970s and 1980s, but now Gorumara is one of the parks least threatened by poaching, with well-equipped rangers and with villagers benefiting from park visitors. However, grazing from fringe villages, and man-made brush fires are major issues at the park.

A recent issue at the park is the increasing number of train accidents involving elephants on railway lines near the park. Three elephants were killed in separate incidents on the same day in May 2006 in train mishaps. Indian Railways and park authorities are presently trying to address the problem.

== Park-specific information ==
=== Activities ===
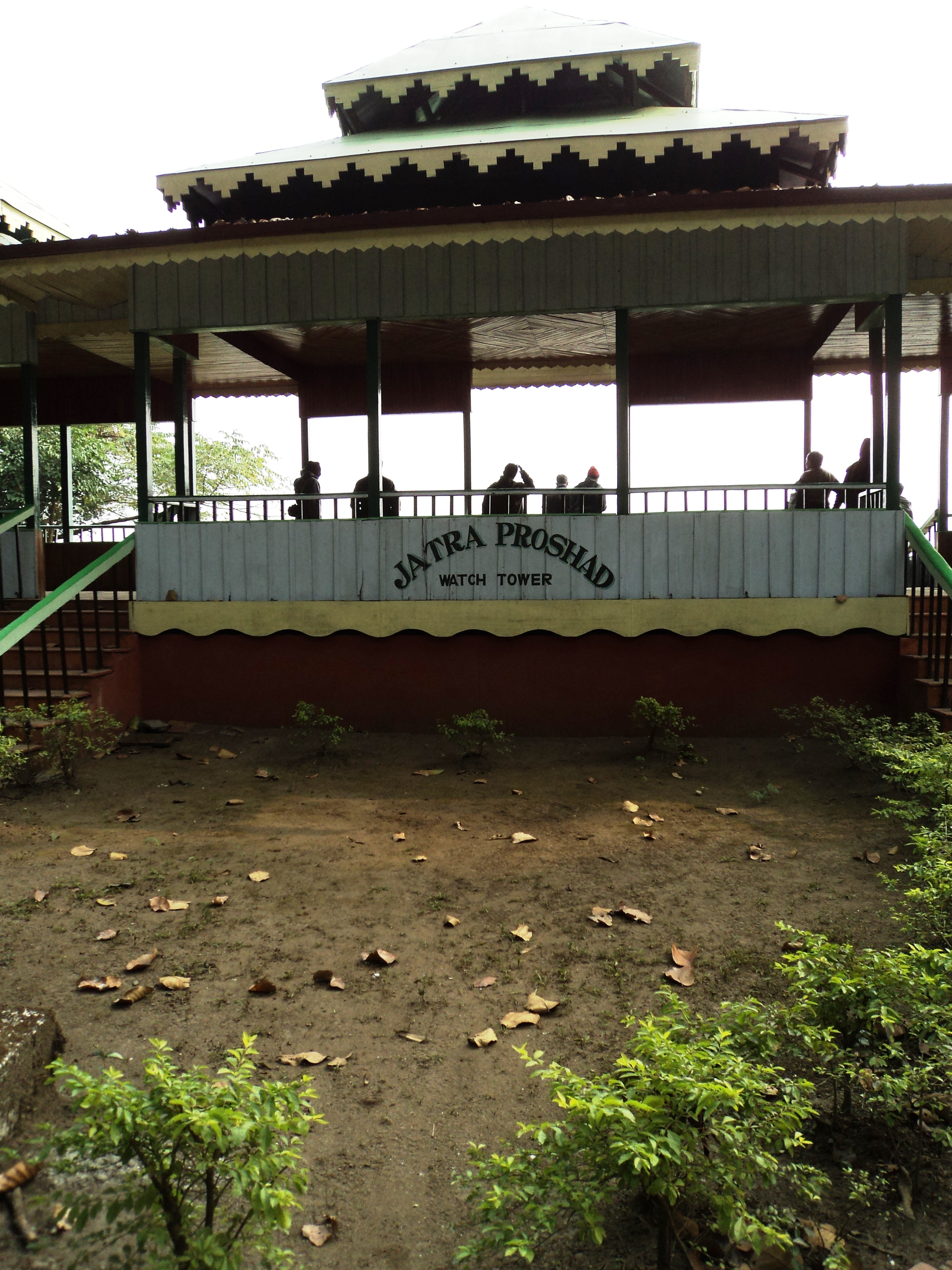
Jatraprosad Watch Tower

There are numerous watchtowers at the park, facilitating wildlife observation. The watchtowers are:

- Jatraprasad Watch Tower: Named after a legendary elephant
- Rhino Observation Point: Watch tower in front of the Gorumara Forest Bungalow
- Chandrachur Watch Tower (Old Khunia Watch Tower): Near the Murti forest bungalow
- Chukchuki Bird-watching Point: Good for birding
- Medla Watch Tower: Known for panoramic view of surroundings

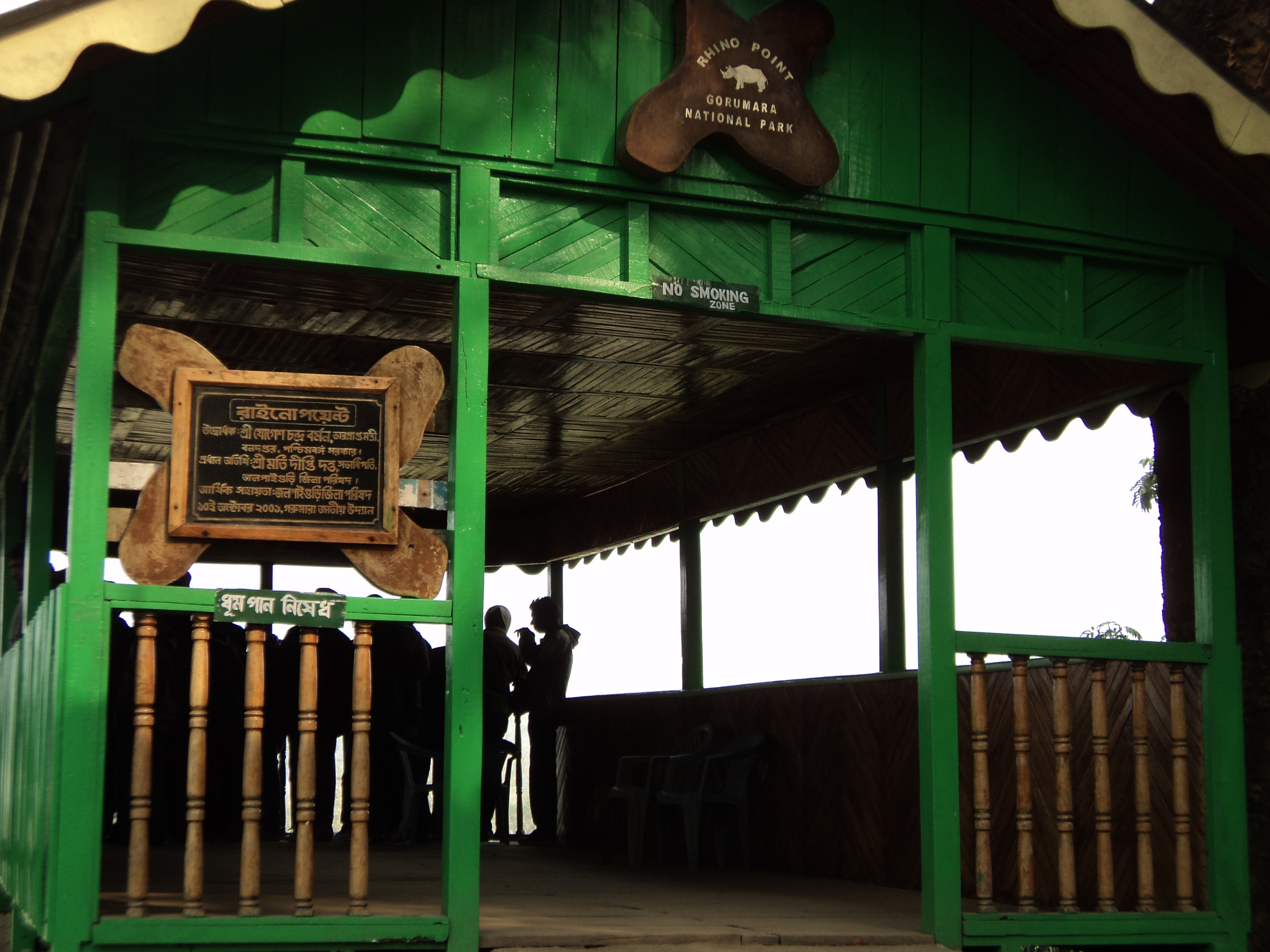
Rhino Point Watch Tower

There are no ranger-led or otherwise four-wheel drive vehicle or elephant-back forays into the jungle. Hiking is permitted on metalled roads, but is potentially unsafe considering the population of elephants, gaur and rhinoceros present in the park. The park is closed in the Monsoon season from 16 June to 15 September. The best time to visit Gorumara is from November to March.

One can also visit the adjoining forest villages to get acquainted with the lifestyle and culture of the villagers. A live show of the ethnic tribal dance can be seen every evening in Budhuram Forest Village.

One can visit the Lataguri Nature Interpretation Centre for an interpretive exhibit of the local natural history.

=== Lodging ===
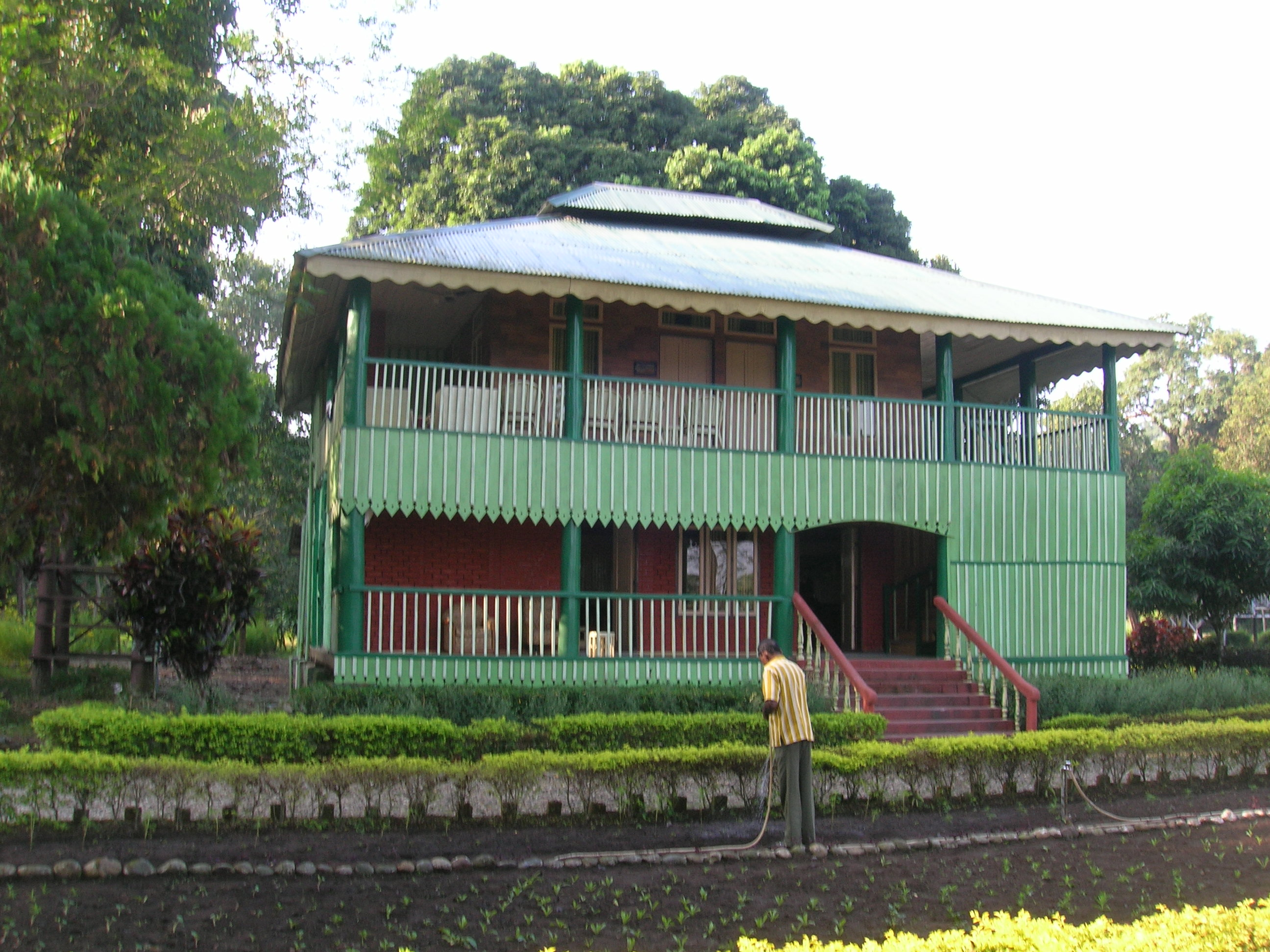
Rest house inside forest

The park forest bungalow is an old wooden rustic cottage which has a watchtower overlooking the salt reservoir.

Accommodations are also available in River Wood Forest Retreats, a 4 star resort overlooking the Gorumara national park and Murti River and at Gorumara Elephant Camp at Dhupjhora. One can stay in newly constructed cottages in the Kalipur village at the fringe of Gorumara built by the State Forest Department. There are many private resort at Lataguri and Ramsai.

=== Approach ===
- Nearest airport: Bagdogra, Darjeeling district, West Bengal about 80 km away
- Nearest railhead: broad gauge: New Maynaguri railway station, New Mal Jn & Chalsa, Jalpaiguri district, West Bengal are approx 18 km. from the park. Important railstation: New Jalpaiguri.
- Nearest highway: NH 717 (Old NH-31) between Chalsa and Mainaguri passes over Lataguri, the entrance to the park.
- Nearest town: On the one side Lataguri is 8 km from the park's entrance & Ramsai is other part of the National Park.
- Nearest city: Mainaguri(Maynaguri) is 17 km from the park. The city of Jalpaiguri is 42 km to the south of the park.
- Best way to reach:New Jalpaiguri is connected with any part of India by Rail rought. Tourist can hire a taxi or use the public bus to reach Lataguri or Ramsai. Buses starts from Siliguri (NJP) every 15 minutes for Mainaguri. It is 90 minutes journey. There are plenty of buses from Maynaguri to Lataguri or Ramsai or tourist can reach New Maynaguri railway station by train ( 13141 Teesta Torsha Express, 15959 Kamrup Express, 12377-05725 Padatik Express- link). It is 20 minutes journey to Lataguri or Ramsai from Maynaguri.

13149 Kanchankannya Ex. reaches New Mal Jn every day. Bus or Taxi may be used by travelers to reach lataguri.

NJP or Siliguri—→Mainaguri or Malbazar—→ Lataguri or Ramsai

== Other attractions ==
- Ethnic Forest Village Tourism
- Nature Interpretation Centre

== Image gallery ==
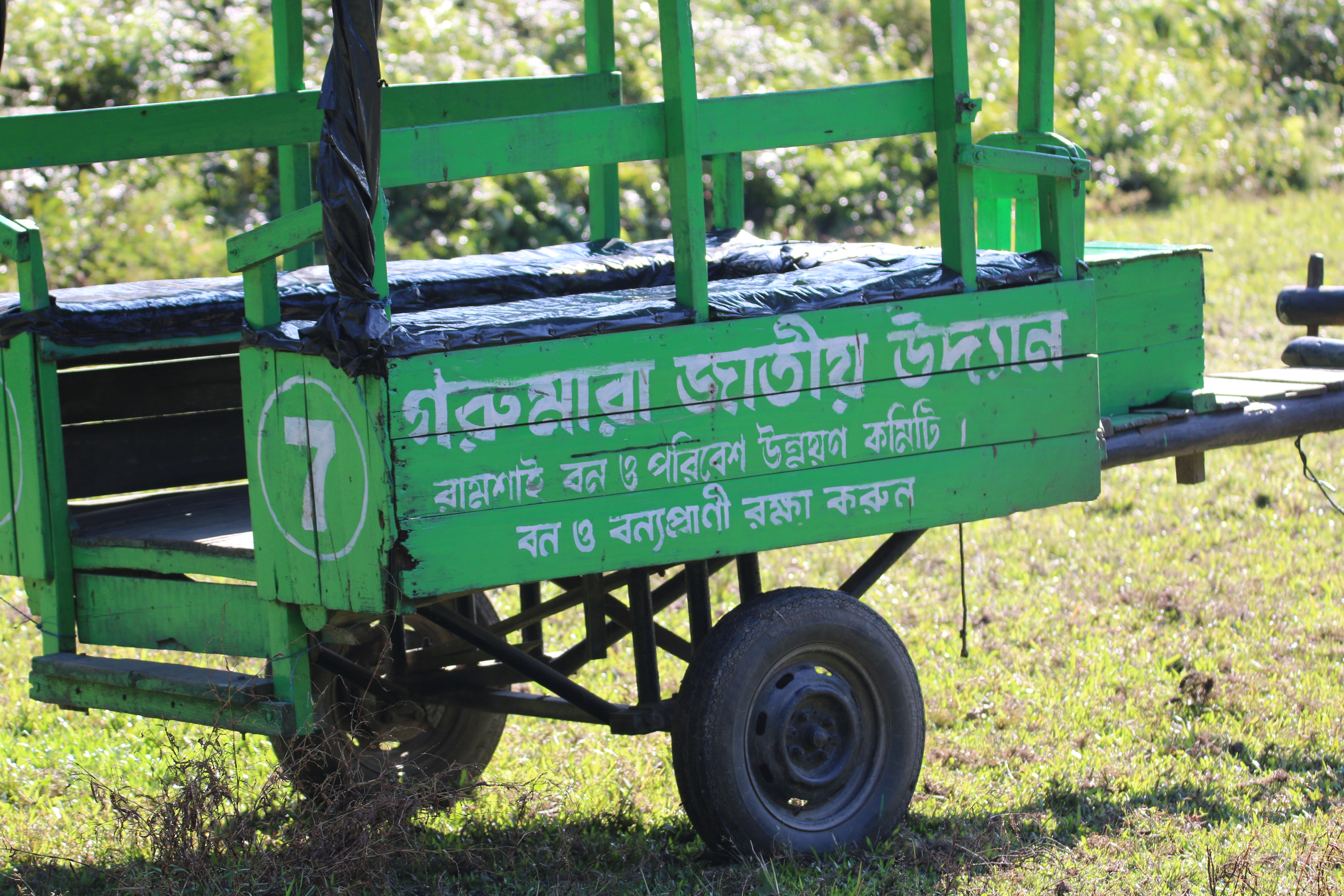
Bullock cart for tourists

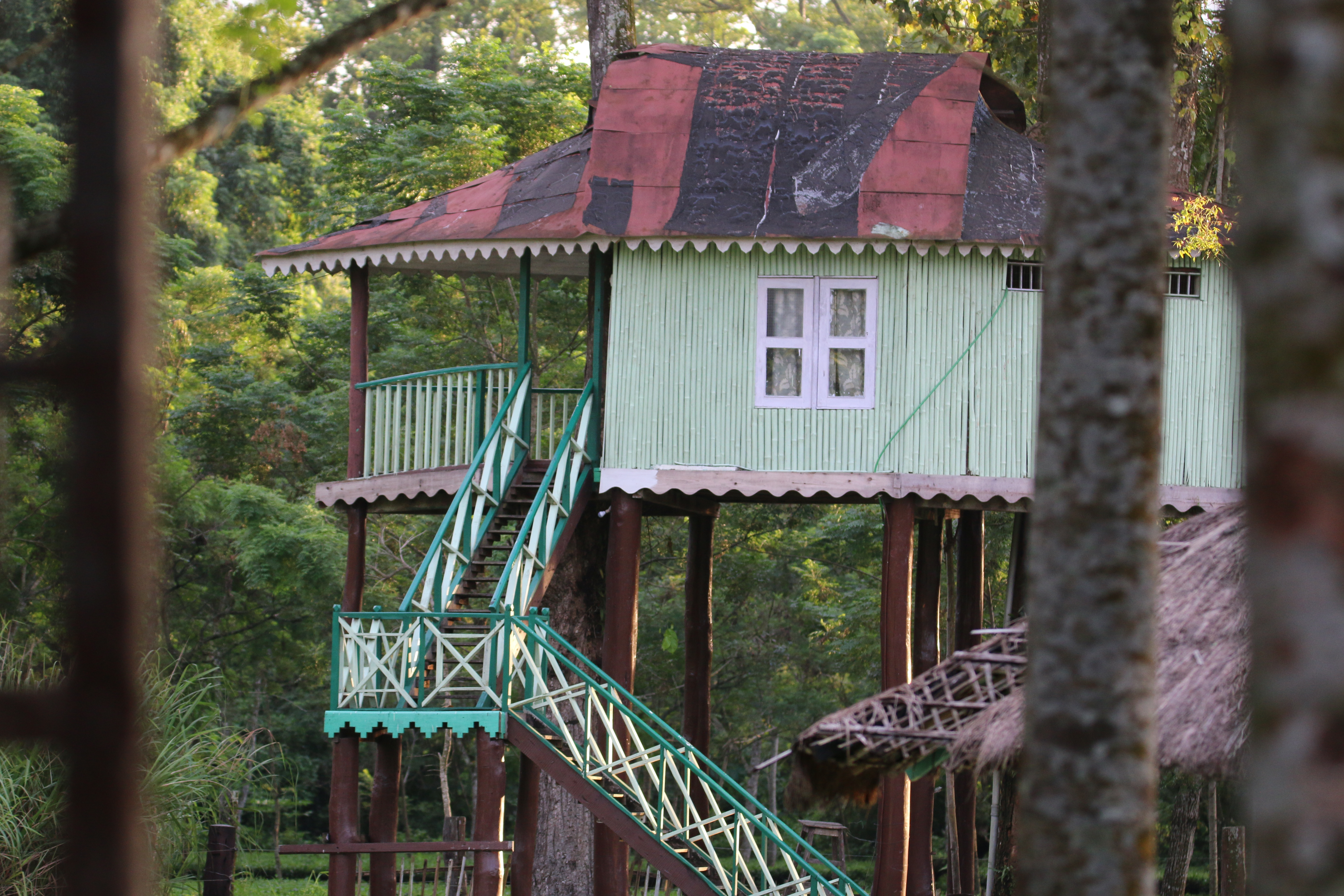
Tree house

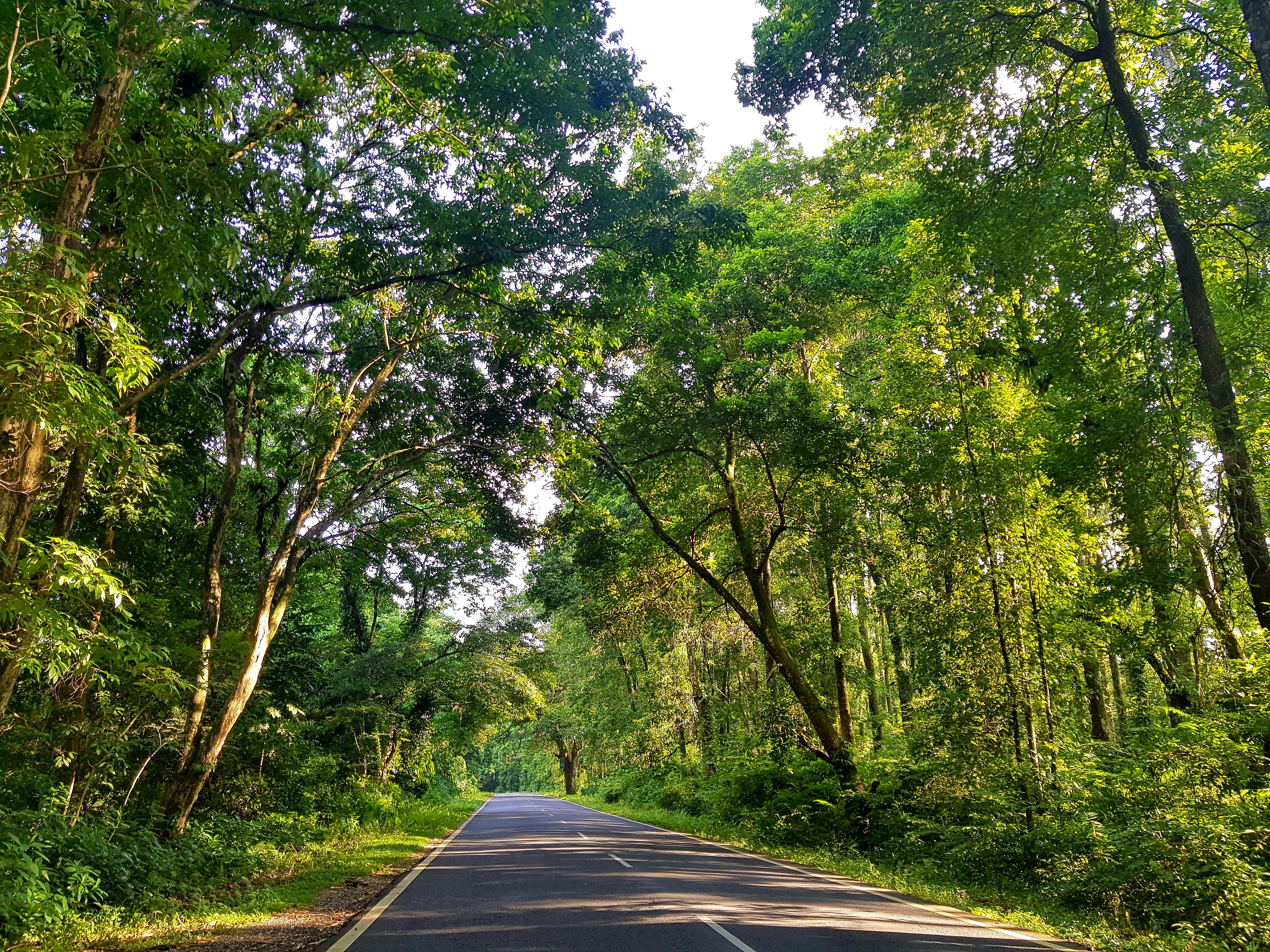
National Highway 717 penetrating the national park

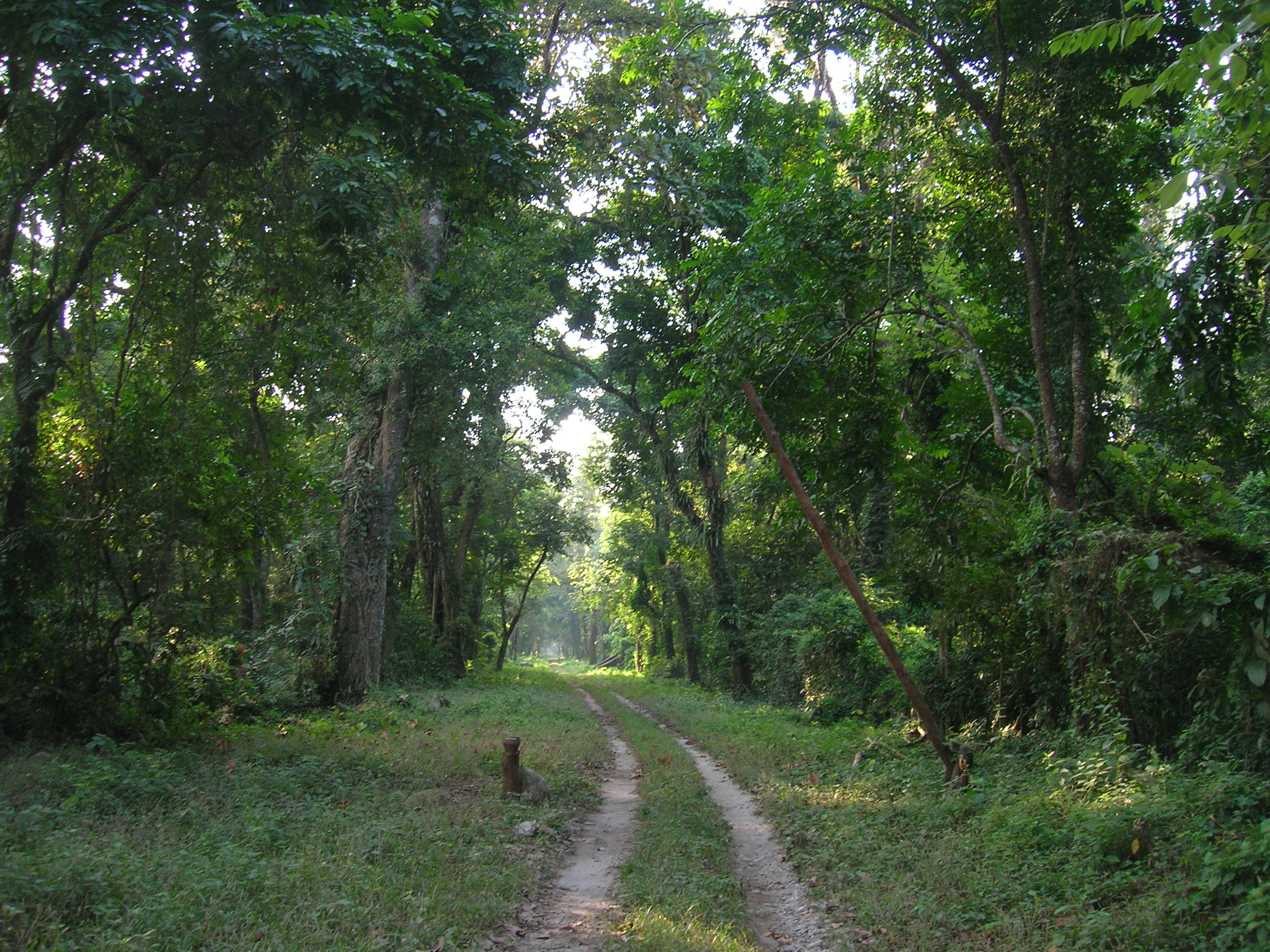
A path inside the park

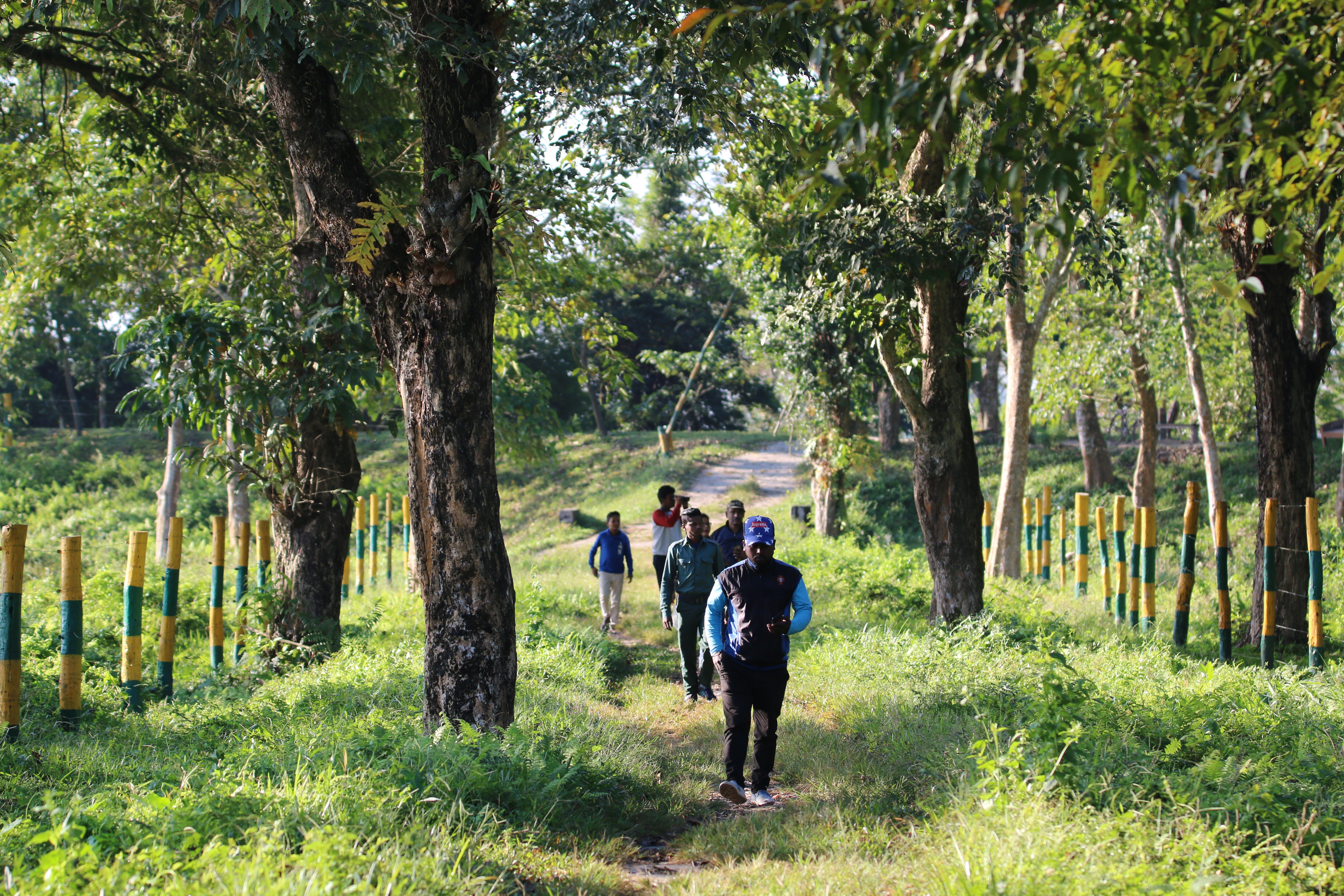
Tourists walking towards Medla watch tower

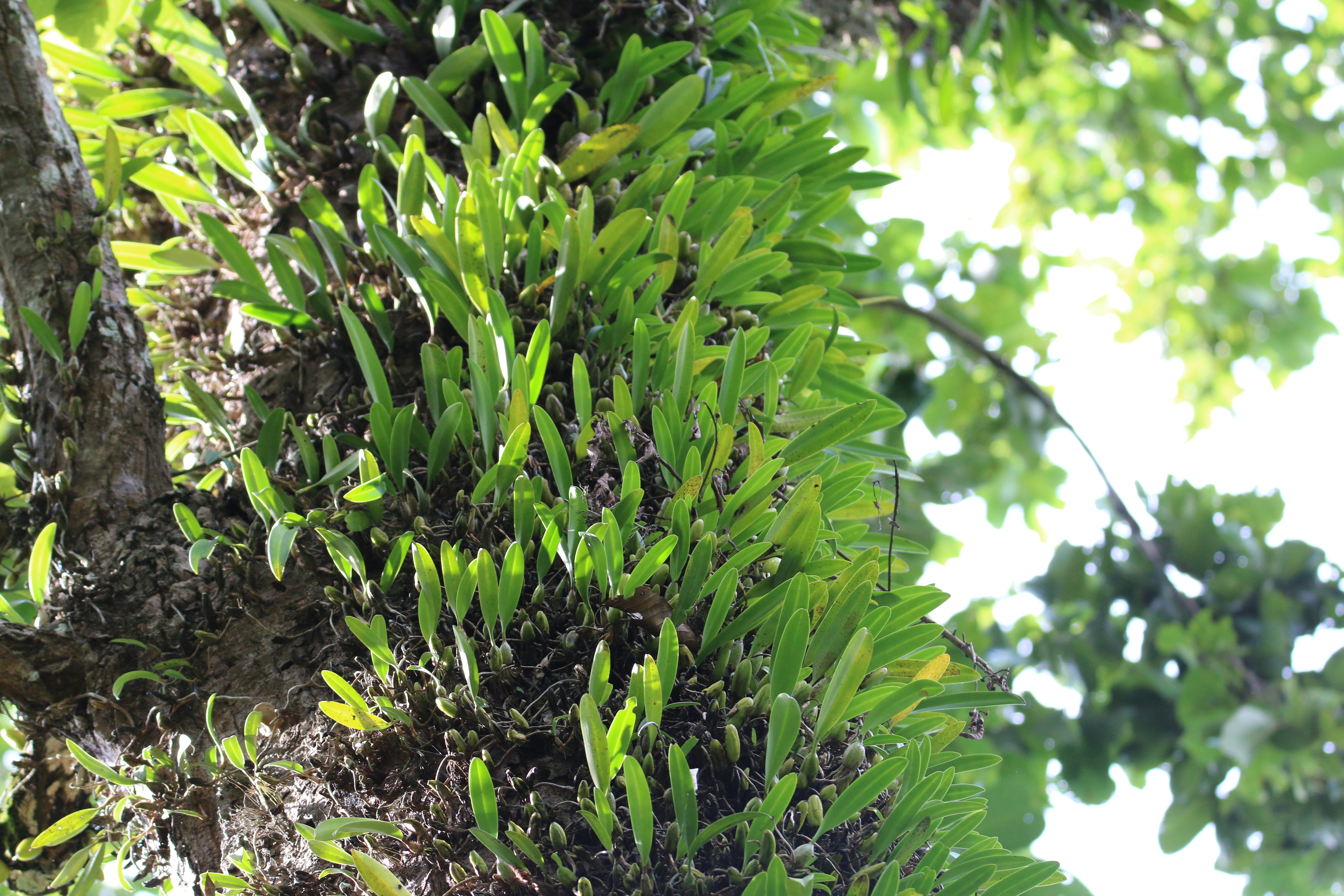
Parasitic plants

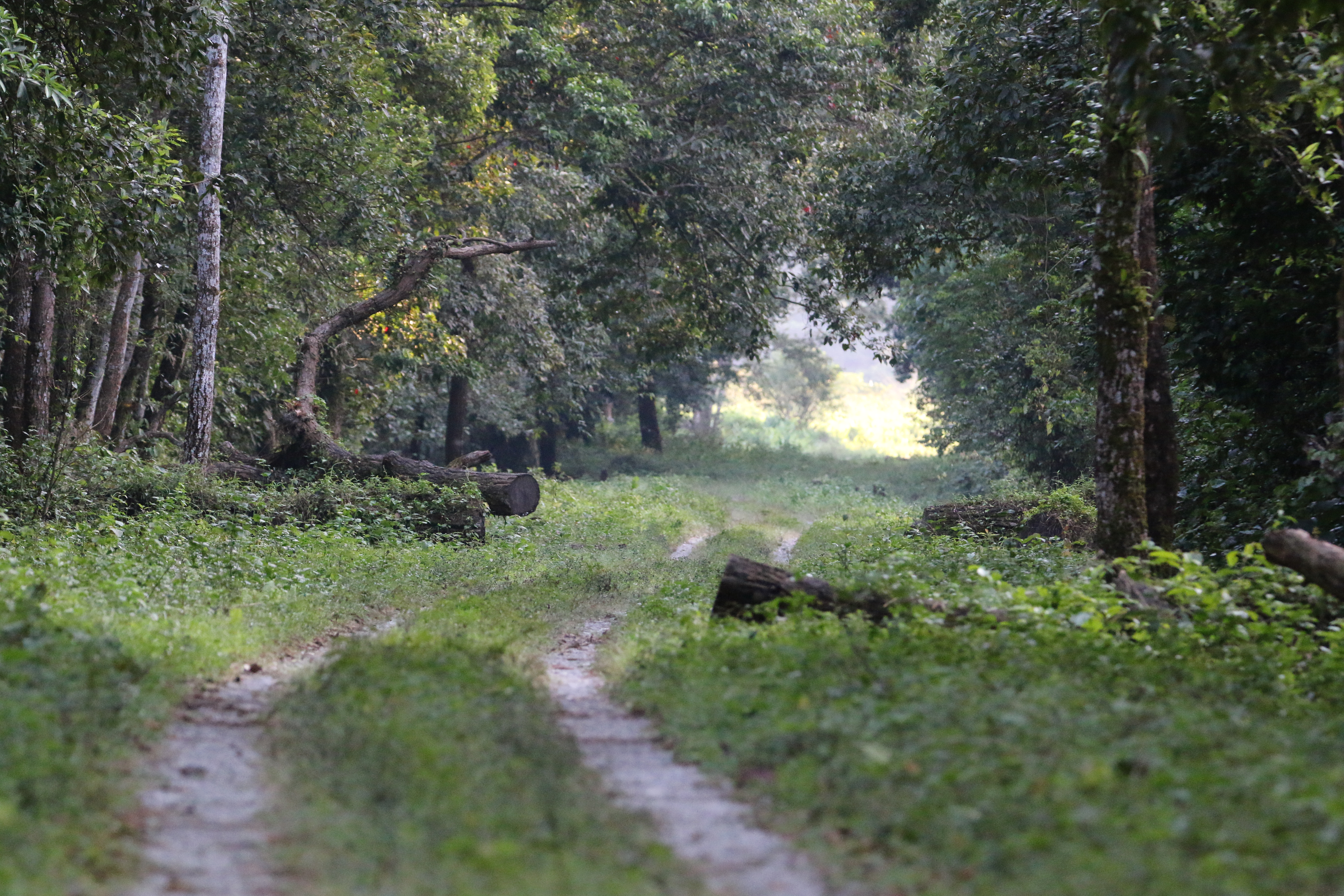
Way for tourists in Gorumara National Park

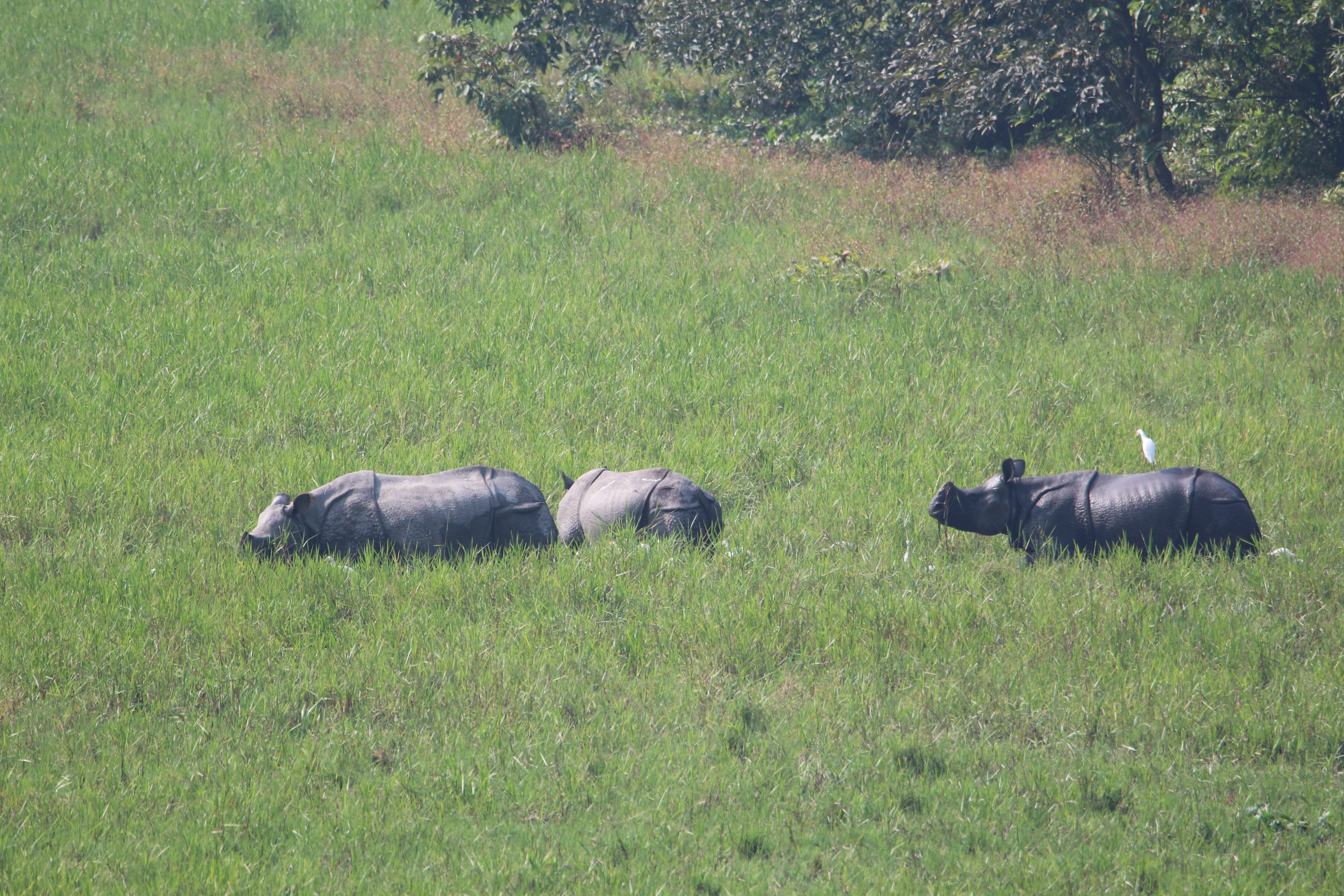
A group of Rhinos

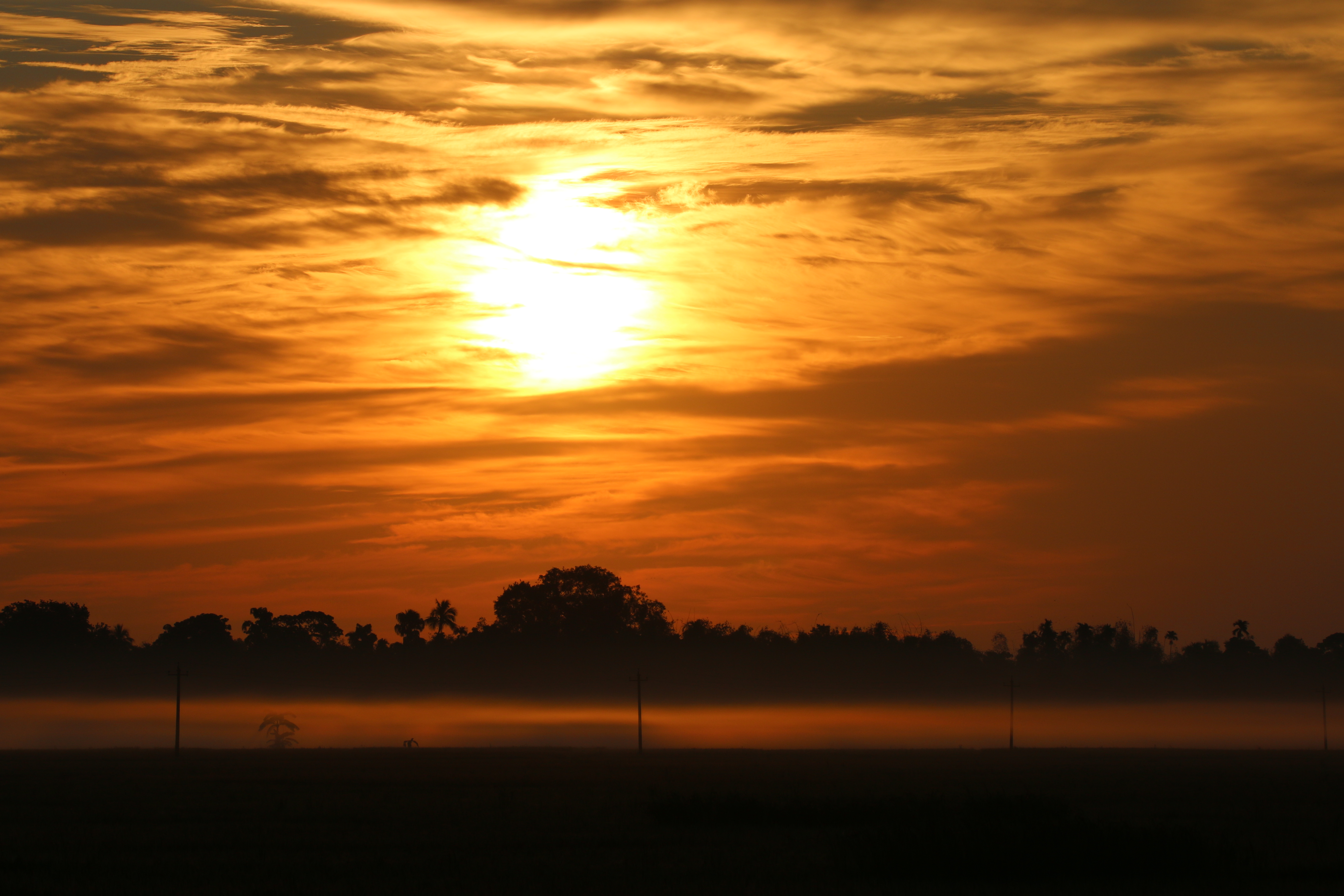
Sunrise at Gorumara National Park

== See also ==
- Neora Valley National Park
- Mahananda Wildlife Sanctuary
- Chapramari Wildlife Sanctuary
- Pangolakha Wildlife Sanctuary
- Kyongnosla Alpine Sanctuary
- Gorumara National Park travel guide from Wikivoyage
