= Malbazar subdivision =

- Subdivision
- Coordinates: 26.85°N 88.75°E
- Country: India
- State: West Bengal
- District: Jalpaiguri
- Headquarters: Malbazar

Languages
  - Official: Bengali, English
- Time zone: UTC+5:30 (IST)
- ISO 3166 code: ISO 3166-2:IN
- Vehicle registration: WB

Malbazar subdivision is an administrative division of the Jalpaiguri district in the Indian state of West Bengal.

== Geography ==
=== Subdivisions ===
Jalpaiguri district is divided into the following administrative subdivisions:

Subdivision	Headquarters	Area km^{2}	Population (2011)	Rural Population % (2011)	Urban Population % (2011)
Jalpaiguri Sadar	Jalpaiguri	2,245.47	1,811,885	62.01	37.99
Malbazar	Malbazar	1,150.84	569,711	88.68	11.32
Dhupguri	Dhupguri	-	-	-	-
Jalpaiguri district	Jalpaiguri	3,396.31	2,381,596	68.39	31.61

Places and tea estates in Malbabazar subdivision (including Mal, Nagrakata and Matiali CD blocks) in Jalpaiguri district
CT: census town, R: rural/ urban centre, N: neighbourhood, NP: national park/ wildlife sanctuary, TE: tea estate
Abbreviations used in names – TG for Tea Garden (town/village), TE for Tea Estate, JRS: junction railway station
Owing to space constraints in the small map, the actual locations in a larger map may vary slightly

=== Administrative units ===
Malbazar subdivision has 3 police stations, 3 community development blocks, 4 panchayat samitis, 22 gram panchayats, 171 mouzas, 160 inhabited villages, 1 municipality and 6 census towns. The municipality is: Malbazar. The census towns are: Odlabari, Dakshin Odlabari, Lataguri, Matialihat, Chalsa Mahabari and Mangalbari. The subdivision has its headquarters at Malbazar.

== Police stations ==
Police stations in the Malbazar subdivision have the following features and jurisdiction:

Police Station	Area covered km^{2}	International border	Inter-state border km	Municipal Town	CD block
Mal	n/a	-	-	-	Mal (part) Kranti (part)
Nagrakata	n/a	-	-	Malbazar (part)	Nagrakata (part)
Mitiali	n/a	n/a	-	-	Matiali
Banarhat#	n/a	-	-	-	Nagrakata (part)

# Banarhat police station is in Dhupguri subdivision

=== Blocks ===
Community development blocks in the Malbazar subdivision are:

CD block	Headquarters	Area km^{2}	Population (2011)	SC %	ST %	Literacy rate %	Census Towns
Mal	Mal	545.90	299.556	26.84	34.50	66.31	3
Matiali	Chalsa Mahabari	204.90	117,540	14.99	44.06	66.98	3
Nagrakata	Nagrakata	397.48	127,397	13.84	49.16	61.27	-

== Gram Panchayats ==
The subdivision contains 22 gram panchayats under 4 community development blocks:

- Mal (community development block) consists of six gram panchayats, viz. Bagrakot, Damdim, Rangamati, Kumlai, Odlabari and Tesimala.
- Matiali (community development block) consists of five gram panchayats, viz. Bidhannagar, Matiali Hat, Matiali–Batabari–II, Indong–Matiali and Matiali–Batabari–I.
- Nagrakata (community development block) consists of five gram panchayats, viz. Angrabhasa–I, Champaguri, Sulkapara, Angrabhasa–II and Luksan.
- Kranti (community development block) consists of six gram panchayats, viz. Lataguri, Rajadanga, Changmari, Kranti, Moulani and Chipadanga.

== Education ==
Statistics in the table below offer a comprehensive picture of the education scenario in Jalpaguri district, with data for the year 2013-14.

Subdivision	Primary School		Middle School		High School		Higher Secondary School		General College, Univ		Technical / Professional Instt		Non-formal Education	
Subdivision	Institution	Student	Institution	Student	Institution	Student	Institution	Student	Institution	Student	Institution	Student	Institution	Student
Jalpaiguri Sadar	911	115,080	38	6,912	51	51,110	116	161,827	8	19,460	34	13,075	2,752	189,077
Malbazar	291	40,856	28	4,930	13	14,522	27	37,144	1	3,810	1	252	1,643	78,471
Jalpaiguri district	1,202	156,936	66	11,842	64	65,632	143	198,971	9	13,270	35	13,327	4,395	267,448

Note: Primary schools include junior basic schools; middle schools, high schools and higher secondary schools include madrasahs; technical schools include junior technical schools, junior government polytechnics, industrial technical institutes, industrial training centres, nursing training institutes etc.; technical and professional colleges include engineering colleges, medical colleges, para-medical institutes, management colleges, teachers training and nursing training colleges, law colleges, art colleges, music colleges etc. Special and non-formal education centres include sishu siksha kendras, madhyamik siksha kendras, centres of Rabindra mukta vidyalaya, recognised Sanskrit tols, institutions for the blind and other handicapped persons, Anganwadi centres, reformatory schools etc.

=== Educational institutions ===
The following institution is located in the Malbazar subdivision:

- Parimal Mitra Smriti Mahavidyalaya was established at Malbazar in 1985. Affiliated with the University of North Bengal, it offers courses in arts and commerce.

== Healthcare ==
The table below (all data in numbers) presents an overview of the medical facilities available and patients treated in the hospitals, health centres and sub-centres in Jalpaiguri district, with data for the year 2014:

Subdivision	Health & Family Welfare Deptt, WB				Other State Govt Deptts	Local bodies	Central Govt Deptts / PSUs	NGO / Private Nursing Homes	Total	Total Number of Beds	Total Number of Doctors*	Indoor Patients	Outdoor Patients
Subdivision	Hospitals	Rural Hospitals	Block Primary Health Centres	Primary Health Centres	Other State Govt Deptts	Local bodies	Central Govt Deptts / PSUs	NGO / Private Nursing Homes	Total	Total Number of Beds	Total Number of Doctors*	Indoor Patients	Outdoor Patients
Jalpaiguri Sadar	2	4	-	18	2	1	2	21	50	1965	269	136,901	1,435,220
Malbazar	1	1	2	7	-	-	-	19	30	541	50	33,971	448,216
Jalpaiguri district	3	5	2	25	2	1	2	40	30	2,506	319	170,872	1,883.436

.* Excluding nursing homes.

=== Medical facilities ===
Medical facilities in the Malbazar subdivision are as follows:

Hospitals: (Name, location, beds)

- Mal Subdivisional Hospital, Malbazar, 100 beds

Rural Hospitals: (Name, CD block, location, beds)

- Sulkapara Rural Hospital, Nagrakata CD block, Sulkapara, 30 beds

Block Primary Health Centres: (Name, CD block, location, beds)

- Mangalbari Block Primary Health Centre, Matiali CD block, PO Chalsa, 15 beds
- Odlabari Block Primary Health Centre, Mal CD block, Odlabari, PO Panbari, 10 beds

Primary Health Centres : (CD block-wise)(CD block, PHC location, beds)

- Matiali CD block: Indong Metali (6), Mathachulka (10).
- Nagrakata CD block: Lookshan (4), Dhumpara (PO Nathna) (10).
- Mal CD block: Chak Moulani (PO Lataguri) (6), Uttar Saripukhari (PO Krantihat) (4), Dakshin Hanskhali (6).

== Legislative segments ==
As per order of the Delimitation Commission in respect of the delimitation of constituencies in the West Bengal, the Malbazar municipality the Mal block will constitute the Mal assembly constituency of West Bengal. The Metiali block and the Nagrakata block will be part of the Nagrakata assembly constituency. Both the constituencies will be reserved for Scheduled Tribes (ST) candidates. Mal constituency will be part of Jalpaiguri (Lok Sabha constituency), which will be reserved for Scheduled Castes (SC) candidates. Nagrakata constituency will be part of Alipurduars (Lok Sabha constituency), which will be reserved for ST candidates.
