= Jaldapara National Park =

National park in India

- IUCN category II (national park)
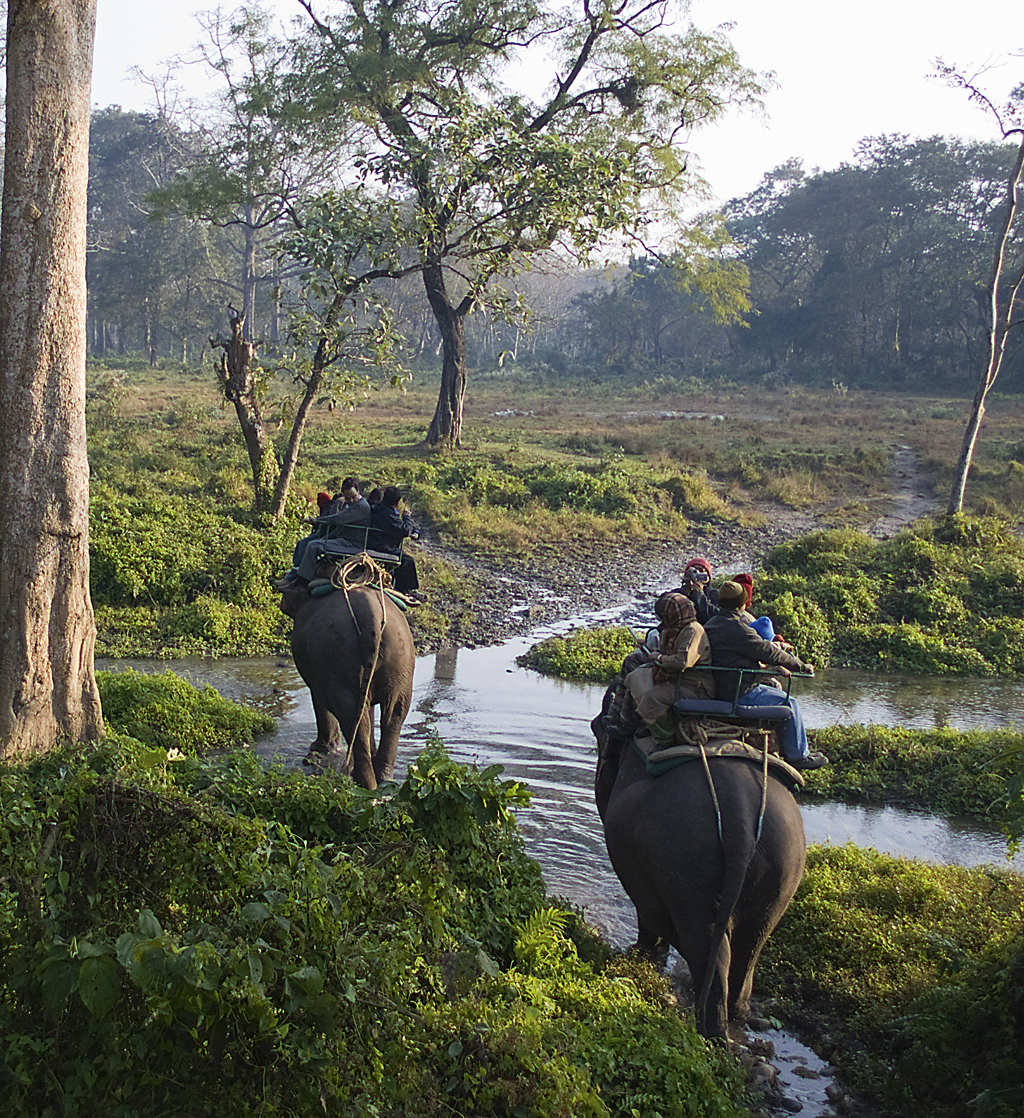
- An elephant safari through the Jaldapara Sanctuary

- Location within West Bengal Location within India
- Interactive map of Jaldapara National Park
- Location: Alipurduar district, West Bengal, India
- Nearest city: Madarihat, Birpara
- Coordinates: 26.6909°N 89.2763°E
- Area: 216.51 km^{2} (83.59 sq mi)
- Website: www.jaldaparanationalprk.org

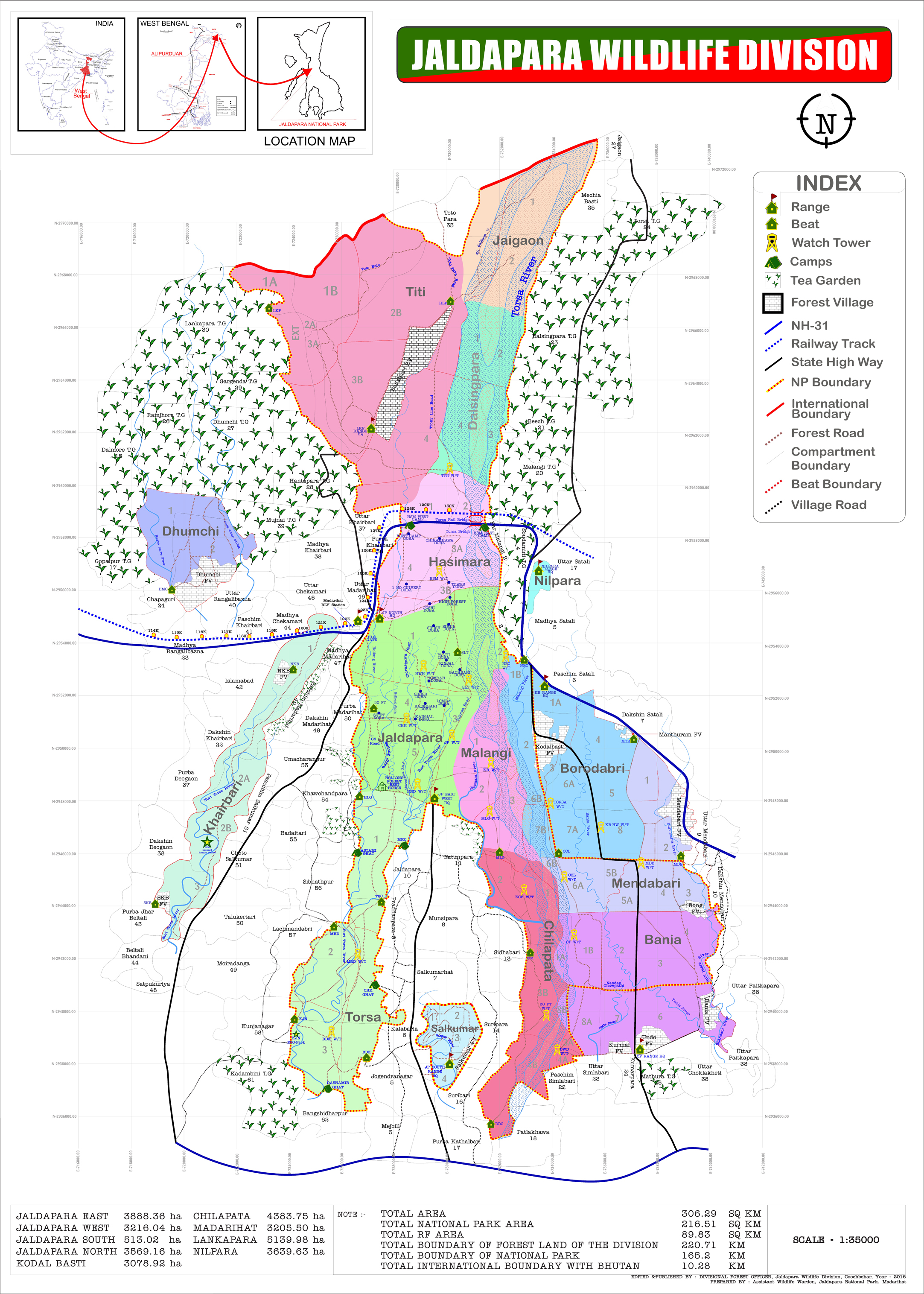

Jaldapara National Park (Pron: ˌʤʌldəˈpɑ:rə) is a national park situated at the foothills of the Eastern Himalayas in Alipurduar District of northern West Bengal, India, and on the banks of the Torsa River. It is situated at an elevation of 61 m (200 ft) and is spread across 216.51 km^{2} (83.59 sq mi) of vast grassland with patches of riverine forest. It was declared a sanctuary in 1941 for protection of its great variety of flora and fauna. It is a habitat management area.

Today, Jaldapara National Park has the largest population of the Indian rhinoceros in the state.

== History ==
Toto and Mech tribes (Bodos) used to stay in this area before 1800. At that time this place was known as "Totopara". Formerly Jaldapara Wildlife Sanctuary, established in 1941, has been elevated to Jaldapara National Park in May 2014 and is primarily meant for the conservation of the Indian rhinoceros.

== Flora and fauna ==
The forest is mainly savannah covered with tall elephant grasses. The main attraction of the park is the Indian one-horned rhinoceros. The park holds the largest rhino population in India after Kaziranga National Park in Assam. Other animals in the park include Indian leopard, Indian elephant, sambar, barking deer, chital, hog deer, wild boar and gaur. A floristic investigation was made during 2016–2018 to document the tree diversity and their present status in the Jaldapara National Park. A total of 294 species of trees belonging to 189 genera and 63 families, including four species of gymnosperms were recorded.
