= Telipara Tea Garden =

- Census Town
- Location in West Bengal, India Telipara Tea Garden (India)
- Coordinates: 26.7307°N 89.0518°E
- Country: India
- State: West Bengal
- District: Jalpaiguri

Area
  - Total: 15.5407 km^{2} (6.0003 sq mi)

Population (2011)
  - Total: 11,535
  - Density: 742.24/km^{2} (1,922.4/sq mi)
- Time zone: UTC+5:30 (IST)
- PIN: 735212
- Telephone/STD code: 03563
- Vehicle registration: WB
- Lok Sabha constituency: Jalpaiguri
- Vidhan Sabha constituency: Madarihat
- Website: jalpaiguri.gov.in

Telipara Tea Garden is a census town in the Dhupguri CD block in the Jalpaiguri Sadar subdivision of the Jalpaiguri district in the state of West Bengal, India.

== Geography ==
Places and tea estates in Jalpaiguri Sadar subdivision (including Rajganj, Jalpaiguri, Maynaguri and Dhupguri CD blocks) in Jalpaiguri district
CT: census town, R: rural/ urban centre, N: neighbourhood, C: cantonment, NP: national park/ wildlife sanctuary, TE: tea estate
Abbreviations used in names – TG for Tea Garden (town/village), TE for Tea Estate, JRS: junction railway station
Owing to space constraints in the small map, the actual locations in a larger map may vary slightly

=== Location ===
Telipara Tea Garden is located at 26.7307°N 89.0518°E.

=== Area overview ===
The map alongside shows the alluvial floodplains south of the outer foothills of the Himalayas. The area is mostly flat, except for low hills in the northern portions. It is a primarily rural area with 62.01% of the population living in rural areas and a moderate 37.99% living in the urban areas. Tea gardens in the Dooars and Terai regions produce 226 million kg or over a quarter of India's total tea crop. Some tea gardens were identified in the 2011 census as census towns or villages. Such places are marked in the map as CT (census town) or R (rural/ urban centre). Specific tea estate pages are marked TE.

Note: The map alongside presents some of the notable locations in the subdivision. All places marked in the map are linked in the larger full screen map.

== Demographics ==
According to the 2011 Census of India, Telipara Tea Garden had a total population of 11,535 of which 5,708 (49%) were males and 5,827 (51%) were females. There were 1,398 persons in the age range of 0 to 6 years. The total number of literate people in Telipara Tea Garden was 6,814 (67.22% of the population over 6 years).

== Infrastructure ==
According to the District Census Handbook 2011, Jalpaiguri, Telipara Tea Garden covered an area of 15.5407 km^{2}. Among the civic amenities, the protected water supply involved overhead tanks, uncovered wells. It had 986 domestic electric connections. Among the medical facilities it had 1 family welfare centre, 10 medicine shops. Among the educational facilities it had 7 primary schools, 2 middle schools, 2 secondary schools, 1 senior secondary school, the nearest general degree college at Dhupguri 22 km away. An important commodity it produced was tea. It had branch of 1 nationalised bank.

== Education ==
Banarhat Kartik Oraon Hindi Government College was established at Banarhat in 2014. Affiliated with the University of North Bengal, it is a Hindi-medium institution offering courses in arts and science.
