= Binnaguri =

- Town
- Nickname: BNG
- Location in West Bengal, India
- Coordinates: 26.7641°N 89.0558°E
- Country: India
- State: West Bengal
- District: Jalpaiguri

Languages
  - Official: Bengali, English
- Time zone: UTC+5:30 (IST)
- PIN: 735203
- Telephone code: 03563
- Lok Sabha constituency: Alipurduar(ST)
- Vidhan Sabha constituency: Madarihat (ST)
- Website: jalpaiguri.gov.in

Binnaguri is a cantonment town located in the Jalpaiguri district of West Bengal state, India. It is located at 26° 46' N latitude and 89° 3' E longitude at an altitude of 216 metres above sea level.

== Geography ==
Places and tea estates in Jalpaiguri Sadar subdivision (including Rajganj, Jalpaiguri, Maynaguri and Dhupguri CD blocks) in Jalpaiguri district
CT: census town, R: rural/ urban centre, N: neighbourhood, C: cantonment, NP: national park/ wildlife sanctuary, TE: tea estate
Abbreviations used in names – TG for Tea Garden (town/village), TE for Tea Estate, JRS: junction railway station
Owing to space constraints in the small map, the actual locations in a larger map may vary slightly

=== Area overview ===
The map alongside shows the alluvial floodplains south of the outer foothills of the Himalayas. The area is mostly flat, except for low hills in the northern portions. It is a primarily rural area with 62.01% of the population living in rural areas and a moderate 37.99% living in the urban areas. Tea gardens in the Dooars and Terai regions produce 226 million kg or over a quarter of India's total tea crop. Some tea gardens were identified in the 2011 census as census towns or villages. Such places are marked in the map as CT (census town) or R (rural/ urban centre). Specific tea estate pages are marked TE.

Note: The map alongside presents some of the notable locations in the subdivision. All places marked in the map are linked in the larger full screen map.

=== Languages ===
Languages spoken in Binnaguri Town (2011)
1. Bengali (91.9%)
2. Rajbongshi (3.00%)
3. Hindi (2.30%)
4. Nepali (1.78%)
5. Others (1.05%)

== Importance ==
Binnaguri lies close to the Bhutan border, the Bhutanese town of Samtse being 10 km to the north. Binnaguri lies in deep Dooars country. Tea gardens are nearby, prominent amongst which are the Binaguri Tea Estate (Binaguri Tea Co. Pvt. Ltd. Kolkata), Moraghat Tea Estate (Binaguri Tea Co. Pvt. Ltd. Kolkata), Telepara Tea Garden, Huldibari Tea Garden, Banarhat Tea Garden, Karbala Tea Garden, Lakhipara Tea Garden, and Gandrapara Tea Garden. The decline in the tea industry has increased the poverty and unemployment in the neighbouring areas. Most of the employment opportunities apart from the tea gardens are in the Army Cantonment, an orphanage and a local chapter of the Dooars Branch Indian Tea Association.

The town is considered the education hub of the region, with institutions like St. James' School, Binnaguri, Army Public School, Binnaguri, Kendriya Vidyalaya, St. Patrick's School and NIOS/IGNOU.

The nearest place of tourist interest is the Jaldapara National Park 30 kilometers from the town.

== Transport ==
Binnaguri is connected by road to the district town of Jalpaiguri and other nearby towns of Dhupguri, Gairkata, Birpara, Banarhat, Alipurduar etc. It lies on National Highway 31C (India, old numbering) which crosses the Teesta River near Siliguri at the Coronation Bridge or Tiger bridge, Binnaguri and onto Hasimara and beyond).

Binnaguri has one important railway station: Binnaguri railway station (Code: BNV, Railway Zone: Northeast Frontier) - on the New Jalpaiguri-Alipurduar-Samuktala Road Line.
