= Dhupguri subdivision =

- Subdivision
- Coordinates: 26.59°N 89.01°E
- Country: India
- State: West Bengal
- District: Jalpaiguri
- Formation: 19 January 2024
- Headquarters: Dhupguri

Languages
  - Official: Bengali, English
- Time zone: UTC+5:30 (IST)
- ISO 3166 code: ISO 3166-2:IN
- Vehicle registration: WB-71/WB-72
- Website: jalpaiguri.gov.in

Dhupguri subdivision is an administrative division of Jalpaiguri district in the state of West Bengal, India.

== History ==
The subdivision was previously part of the Jalpaiguri Sadar subdivision. Following the death of Bishnu Pada Roy, a local Bharatiya Janata Party MLA from Dhupguri, a by-election was held in 2023. The ruling Trinamool Congress (TMC) government promised that if they won the seat, they would establish a separate subdivision within three months. After TMC won the seat, the state assembly passed the motion to form the subdivision on 12 October 2023. The subdivision was officially established on 20 January 2024.

== Administrative units ==
The subdivision will be carved out of Dhupguri town, Banarhat block, and parts of Malbazar. As a result, Jalpaiguri district will have three subdivisions, the others being Jalpaiguri Sadar and Malbazar subdivisions.

=== Police stations ===
Police stations in the Malbazar subdivision have the following features and jurisdiction:

Police Station	Area covered km^{2}	International border	Inter-state border km	Municipal Town	CD block
Dhupguri	n/a	-	-	-	Dhupguri
Banarhat	n/a	Bhutan	-	-	Banarhat #Nagrakata (part)

== Gram Panchayats ==
The subdivision contains 16 gram panchayats under 2 community development blocks:

- Dhupguri (community development block) consists of nine gram panchayats, viz. Barogharia, Gadhearkuthi, Godong I, Godong II, Jharaltagram I, Magurmari I, Magurmari II, Sakoajhora II, and Salbari II.
- Banarhat (community development block) consists of seven gram panchayats, viz. Sakoajhora-I, Salbari-I, Salbari-II, Banarhat-I, Banarhat-II, Chamurchi, and Binnaguri Gram Panchayats.

== Population ==
As of the 2011 Census, total population is 4,14,854.

Population	Rural	Urban	Total
Male	1,93,071	17,500	2,10,571
Female	1,87,019	17,264	2,04,283
Density	813 / km²	1,272 / km²	838 / km²
