= Banarhat (community development block) =

Community development block in West Bengal, India

- Community development block
- Interactive map of Banarhat
- Coordinates: 26.79°N 89.03°E
- Country: India
- State: West Bengal
- District: Jalpaiguri

Population (2011)
  - Total: 218,164

Languages
  - Official: Bengali, English
- Time zone: UTC+5:30 (IST)
- Lok Sabha constituency: Alipurduar(part) Jalpaiguri(part)
- Vidhan Sabha constituency: Dhupguri(part) Nagrakata(part) Madarihat(part)
- Website: jalpaiguri.gov.in

Banarhat is a community development block (CD block) that forms an administrative division in the Dhupguri subdivision of the Jalpaiguri district in the India state of West Bengal.

== Geography ==
Banarhat is located at 26.79°N 89.03°E.

Headquarters of this CD block is at Banarhat.

The Banarhat(CD block) consists of seven gram panchayats. Gram panchayats of Banarhat block / panchayat samiti are: Sakoajhora-I, Salbari-I, Salbari-II, Banarhat-I, Banarhat-II, Chamurchi and Binnaguri Gram Panchayats.

The Banarhat CD block is bounded by the Samtse District of Bhutan on the north, Madarihat-Birpara and Falakata CD blocks in Alipurduar district on the east, Dhupguri and Maynaguri CD blocks on the south, Nagrakata CD block on the west.

== Transport ==
Banarhat is connected by State road to the district city of Jalpaiguri and other nearby towns of Dhupguri, Gairkata, Mainaguri, etc. It lies on National Highway 31C, which crosses the Teesta river at the Coronation Bridge, Siliguri, Oodlabari, Malbazar, Birpara, Hasimara, Alipurduar and beyond.

Banarhat Railway Station the important railway station: Banarhat (Code: BNQ, Railway Zone: Northeast Frontier) - on the New Jalpaiguri-Alipurduar-Samuktala Road Line.

== Education ==
- Banarhat Kartik Oraon Hindi Government College was established at Banarhat in 2014. Affiliated with the North Bengal University, it is a Hindi-medium institution offering courses in arts and science.
