= Dakshin Khairbari =

Dakshin Khayerbari
- Village
- Location in West Bengal
- Coordinates: 26°40′4.42″N 89°12′39.80″E
- Country: India
- State: West Bengal
- District: Jalpaiguri
- Elevation: 80 m (260 ft)

Population (2011)
  - Total: 5,531

Bengali
  - Official: Bengali, English
- Time zone: UTC+5:30 (IST)
- Pin: 735210
- Area Code: 03563
- Website: jalpaiguri.gov.in

Dakshin Khayerbari, also called Dakshin Khairbari, is a village in Barogharia Gram Panchayat of Dhupguri taluk, Jalpaiguri district, West Bengal, India. It is one of the 8 villages in the Panchayat.

According to census 2011 information the location code or village code of Dakshin Khairbari village is 307482. It is situated 7.1 km (4.4 mi) away from sub-district headquarter Dhupguri and 42.6 km (26.5 mi) away from district headquarter Jalpaiguri. As per 2009 statistics, Barogharia is the gram panchayat of Dakshin Khayerbari village.

The total geographical area of village is 713.06 hectares. Dakshin Khayerbari has a total population of 5,531 people as per 2011 census. There are about 1,223 houses in Dakshin Khayerbari village. The village has lower literacy rate compared to West Bengal and most of the villagers, about 4345 out of 5531 belong to Scheduled Caste community.

Dhupguri is nearest town to Dakshin Khayerbari which is approximately 9 km (5.6 mi) away.

The PIN code of Dakshin Khayerbari is 735210.

== Education ==
Schools include:

- Dakshin Khayerbari Addition Primary School
- Dakshin Khayer Bari High School (X)
- Sonardanga Primary School
- Netaji Club & Pathagar
- Begunbari Sarada Shishu Mandir

== Service ==
- A Sub-Road between Dakshin Khairbari and Dhupguri.
- Baba Amareswar Dham (Shiv Mandir)
