= Barogharia =

Village in Jalpaiguri district West Bengal, India

Barogharia is in Dhupguri taluk of Jalpaiguri district, West Bengal, India. Barogharia is also called Barogharia Gram Panchayat and Barogharia Anchal. There are 8 villages in Barogharia Gram Panchayat divided into 22 wards. It has 21 elected members.

Pratap Mazumder from Dakshin Khairbari is present Prodhan from the year 2015. The PIN code of Barogharia is 735210. The villages in the panchayat are Jakhaikona, Patkidaha, Dakshin Dangapara, Dambari, Dakshin Khairbari, Madhya Boragari, Bara Gharia and Bhemtia.

In 2024, the panchayat has taken development works including laying of roads, sanitation, installation of new water sources, maintenance of health sub centres and schools.
