= Mamata Roy =

Indian politician

Member of West Bengal Legislative Assembly
- In office 2011–2016
- Preceded by: Laxmi Kanta Roy
- Succeeded by: Mitali Roy
- Constituency: Dhupguri constituency

Chairman-Council Member of Dhupguri Municipality
- In office 2007–2011

Personal details
- Party: Communist Party of India (Marxist)

Mamata Roy is an Indian anganwadi worker and former member of the West Bengal Legislative Assembly. Between 2011 and 2016, she served as the representative of the Dhupguri constituency and as a member of the Communist Party of India (Marxist).

== Personal life ==
Mamata Roy is a resident of Dhupguri town in the Jalpaiguri district of West Bengal. She received her education from the Bairatiguri High School from where she passed out in 1992 and became an Integrated Child Development Services worker. Roy identifies herself as a communist.

== Political career ==
In the 2007 elections for the municipality of Dhupguri, Roy contested as a candidate of the Communist Party of India (Marxist) and was elected from ward number 7, polling at 58.92% of the votes cast in her favor.

Before the 2011 West Bengal Legislative Assembly election, the communist party denied re-nomination for the legislator Laxmi Kanta Roy, two term incumbent from the Dhupguri constituency and instead nominated Roy to contest as the party candidate. Subsequently, she emerged as the winning candidate against her primary opponent, Mina Barman who was the wife of the Trinamool Congress's district head and was therefore nominated as their candidate. Roy won the election polling at 42.25% of the votes cast in her favor against 39.82% of the votes cast in favor of Barman. During her tenure as the representative of the constituency, she was involved in organising a protest movement launched by the communist party in the Dhupguri area after a teenage girl was raped and murdered. The girl herself had earlier protested against a kangaroo court who had assaulted her farmer father over an equipment renting dispute; the kangaroo court was notably held in the presence of local leaders of the Trinamool Congress. Roy was also involved in raising concerns and agitating against instances of starvation deaths in the tea gardens, and the lack of communication with local bodies and non-appointment of teachers by the state government in local educational institutions.

In the 2016 West Bengal Legislative Assembly election, she lost her seat in the legislature to the new Trinamool Congress candidate Mitali Roy, who had contested as an independent candidate in the previous election. In August 2020, Roy testified that she was contacted by the Trinamool Congress and presented with an offer to her supply her with funds to contest the 2021 West Bengal Legislative Assembly election as their candidate from the constituency, which she refused. The incident was corroborated by Laxmi Kanta Roy who testified that a similar offer was rejected by him a few days earlier.
