= Dhupguri (community development block) =

- Community development block
- Coordinates: 26.59°N 89.01°E
- Country: India
- State: West Bengal
- District: Jalpaiguri

Area
  - Total: 565.10 km^{2} (218.19 sq mi)

Population (2011)
  - Total: 414,854
  - Density: 734.12/km^{2} (1,901.4/sq mi)

Languages
  - Official: Bengali, English
- Time zone: UTC+5:30 (IST)
- Lok Sabha constituency: Jalpaiguri
- Vidhan Sabha constituency: Dhupguri, Nagrakata, Madarihat
- Website: jalpaiguri.gov.in

Dhupguri is a community development block (CD block) that forms an administrative division in the Dhupguri subdivision of the Jalpaiguri district in the Indian state of West Bengal.

== Geography ==
The Dhupguri CD block lies in the eastern part of the district. The Jaldhaka River flows along a portion of its western boundary and the Dadua River flows along its eastern boundary. The northern portion has hilly terrain which is part of the sub-Himalayan ranges, the central tract is locally called Bhaber. The southern portion is gently sloping alluvial plain locally called Terai.

The Dhupguri CD block is bounded by the Banarhat CD block on the north, Madarihat-Birpara and Falakata CD blocks in Alipurduar district on the east, Mekhliganj and Mathabhanga II CD blocks in Cooch Behar district on the south, and Maynaguri CD block on the west.

The Dhupguri CD block has an area of 565.10 km^{2}. It has 1 panchayat samity, 9 gram panchayats, 296 gram sansads (village councils), 103 mouzas, 98 inhabited villages and 2 census towns. Dhupguri and Banarhat police stations serve this block. Headquarters of this CD block is at Dhupguri.

Gram panchayats of Dhupguri block/ panchayat samiti are: Barogharia, Gadhearkuthi, Godong I, Godong II, Jharaltagram I, Magurmari I, Magurmari II, Sakoajhora II, and Salbari II.

== Demographics ==
=== Population ===
According to the 2011 Census of India, the Dhupguri CD block had a total population of 414,854, of which 380,090 were rural, and 34,764 were urban. There were 210,571 (51%) males and 204,283 (49%) females. There were 38,992 persons in the age range of 0 to 6 years. The Scheduled Castes numbered 190,816 (46.00%) and the Scheduled Tribes numbered 87,273 (21.04%).

According to the 2001 census, Dhupguri block had a total population of 417,519, out of which 217,015 were males and 200,504 were females. Dhupguri block registered a population growth of 20.89 per cent during the 1991-2001 decade.

Census towns in the Dhupguri CD block are (2011 census figures in brackets): Banarhat (15,652), Telipara Tea Garden (11,535) and Gairkata (7,577).

Large villages (with 4,000+ population) in the Dhupguri CD block are (2011 census figures in brackets): Red Bank Tea Garden (4,114), Ambari Tea Garden (4,800), Chaumurchi Tea Garden (11,663), Chuna Bhati Tea Garden (5,252), Kathalguri Tea Garden (6,090), Riabari Tea Garden (4,448), Haritalguri Tea Garden (6,778), Diana Tea Garden (4,097), Debpara Tea Garden (5,276), Lakshmipara Tea Garden (5,963), Gendrapara Tea Garden (9,358), Maraghat Tea Garden (5,011), Karabala Tea Garden (7,958), Binaguri Tea Garden (6,612), Sakojhora (5,586), Gayerkata Tea Garden (9,085), Haldibari Tea Garden (9,103), Mogalkata Tea Garden (5,770), Pradhanpara (5,822), Uttar Khuttimari (4,004), Madhya Khuttimari (5,276), Purbba Daukimari (6,723), Mallik Sobha (5,318), Kalirhat (4,280), Mainatali (5,620), Dakshin Kharibari (5,531), Kahalaigram (6,209), Madhya Boragari (7,987), Bara Gharia (7,090), Paschim Magurmari (5,431), Purba Magurmari (7,361), Purba Mallikpara (5,487), Dakshin Gosairhat (4,394), Kazipara (4,442), Paschim Salbari (4,824), Purba Salbari (4,886), Jhar Salbari (5,899) and Jurapani (4,522).

Other villages in the Dhupguri CD block include (2011 census figures in brackets): Gadang Pratham Khanda (1,454), Gadang Dwitiya Khanda (1,762).

=== Literacy ===
According to the 2011 census, the total number of literate persons in the Dhupguri CD block was 251,875 (69.57% of the population over 6 years) out of which males numbered 142,427 (77.56% of the male population over 6 years) and females numbered 109,448 (61.36% of the female population over 6 years). The gender disparity (the difference between female and male literacy rates) was 16.20%.

See also – List of West Bengal districts ranked by literacy rate

Literacy in CD blocks of
Jalpaiguri district
Jalpaiguri Sadar subdivision
Rajganj – 62.82%
Jalpaiguri – 73.81%
Maynaguri – 75.63%
Dhupguri – 60.57%
Malbazar subdivision
Mal – 66.31
Matiali – 66.98%
Nagrakata – 61.27%
Alipurduar subdivision
Madarihat-Birpara – 67.77%
Kalchini – 68.96%
Kumargram – 72.42%
Alipurduar I – 78.19%
Alipurduar II – 75.76%
Falakata – 72.64%
2011 Census: CD Block Wise

Primary Census Abstract Data

=== Language and religion ===
Religion in Dhupguri CD block (2011)
Hinduism	79.24%
Islam	15.48%
Christianity	4.35%
Buddhism	0.81%
Other or not stated	0.12%

In the 2011 Census of India, Hindus numbered 328,717 and formed 79.24% of the population of Dhupguri CD block. Muslims numbered 64,234 and formed 15.48% of the population. Christians numbered 18,049 and formed 4.35% of the population. Others numbered 3,854 and formed 0.93% of the population. Others include Addi Bassi, Marang Boro, Santal, Saranath, Sari Dharma, Sarna, Alchchi, Bidin, Sant, Saevdharm, Seran, Saran, Sarin, Kheria, and other religious communities.

Languages of Dhupguri CD block (2011)
1. Bengali (53.6%)
2. Sadri (21.2%)
3. 'Other' Bengali (7.76%)
4. Nepali (6.26%)
5. Hindi (2.95%)
6. Rajbongshi (2.14%)
7. Kurukh (1.47%)
8. Bhojpuri (0.96%)
9. Others (3.67%)

At the time of the 2011 census, 53.63% of the population spoke Bengali, 21.16% Sadri, 6.26% Nepali, 2.95% Hindi, 2.14% Rajbongshi, 1.47% Kurukh and 0.96% Bhojpuri as their first language. 7.76% were recorded as speaking 'Other' under Bengali.

== Poverty level ==
Based on a study of the per capita consumption in rural and urban areas, using central sample data of NSS 55th Round 1999-2000, Jalpaiguri district was found to have relatively high rates of poverty of 35.73% in rural areas and 61.53% in the urban areas. It was one of the few districts where urban poverty rate was higher than the rural poverty rate.

According to a World Bank report, as of 2012, 26-31% of the population of Jalpaiguri, Bankura and Paschim Medinipur districts were below poverty line, a relatively high level of poverty in West Bengal, which had an average 20% of the population below poverty line.

== Economy ==
=== Livelihood ===
Livelihood
in Dhupguri CD block
1. Cultivators (16.9%)
2. Agricultural labourers (33.2%)
3. Household industries (1.41%)
4. Other Workers (48.5%)

In the Dhupguri CD block in 2011, among the class of total workers, cultivators numbered 28,443 and formed 16.90%, agricultural labourers numbered 55,850 and formed 33.18%, household industry workers numbered 2,370 and formed 1.41% and other workers numbered 81,639 and formed 48.51%. Total workers numbered 168,302 and formed 40.57% of the total population, and non-workers numbered 246,552 and formed 59.43% of the population.

Note: In the census records a person is considered a cultivator, if the person is engaged in cultivation/ supervision of land owned by self/government/institution. When a person who works on another person's land for wages in cash or kind or share, is regarded as an agricultural labourer. Household industry is defined as an industry conducted by one or more members of the family within the household or village, and one that does not qualify for registration as a factory under the Factories Act. Other workers are persons engaged in some economic activity other than cultivators, agricultural labourers and household workers. It includes factory, mining, plantation, transport and office workers, those engaged in business and commerce, teachers, entertainment artistes and so on.

=== Infrastructure ===
There are 98 inhabited villages in the Dhupguri CD block, as per the District Census Handbook, Jalpaiguri, 2011. 100% villages have power supply. 96 (97.96) villages have drinking water supply. 23 villages (23.47%) have post offices. 75 villages (76.53%) have telephones (including landlines, public call offices and mobile phones). 32 villages (32.65%) have pucca (paved) approach roads and 35 villages (35.71%) have transport communication (includes bus service, rail facility and navigable waterways). 8 villages (8.16%) have agricultural credit societies and 9 villages (9.18%) have banks.

=== Agriculture ===
The economy of the Jalpaiguri district is mainly dependent on agriculture and plantations, and majority of the people are engaged in agriculture. Jalpaiguri is well-known for tea and timber. Other important crops are paddy, jute, tobacco, mustard seeds, sugarcane and wheat. The annual average rainfall is 3,440 mm, around double of that of Kolkata and the surrounding areas. The area is flood prone and the rivers often change course causing immense damage to crops and cultivated lands.

In 2013-14, there were 199 fertiliser depots, 84 seed stores and 78 fair price shops in the Dhupguri CD block.

In 2013–14, the Dhupguri CD block produced 48,311 tonnes of Aman paddy, the main winter crop, from 21,721 hectares, 790 tonnes of Boro paddy (spring crop) from 261 hectares, 8,891 tonnes of Aus paddy (summer crop) from 3,246 hectares, 8,935 tonnes of wheat from 3,210 hectares, 626 tonnesof maize from 294 hectares, 63,155 tonnes of jute from 5,958 hectares, 183,546 tonnes of potatoes from 7,691 hectares and 2,969 tonnes of sugarcane from 29 hectares. It also produced pulses and oilseeds.

In 2013-14, the total area irrigated in the Dhupguri CD block was 13,721 hectares, out of which 4,036 hectares were irrigated by canal water, 320 hectares by tank water, 2,010 hectares by river lift irrigation, 430 hectares by deep tube wells and 6,925 hectares by shallow tube wells.

=== Dooars-Terai tea gardens ===
Tea gardens in the Dooars and Terai regions produce 226 million kg or over a quarter of India's total tea crop.. The Dooars-Terai tea is characterized by a bright, smooth and full-bodied liquor that's a wee bit lighter than Assam tea. Cultivation of tea in the Dooars was primarily pioneered and promoted by the British but there was significant contribution of Indian entrepreneurs.

=== Banking ===
In 2013-14, Dhupguri CD block had offices of 10 commercial banks and 4 gramin banks.

=== Backward Regions Grant Fund ===
The Jalpaiguri district is listed as a backward region and receives financial support from the Backward Regions Grant Fund. The fund, created by the Government of India, is designed to redress regional imbalances in development. As of 2012, 272 districts across the country were listed under this scheme. The list includes 11 districts of West Bengal.

== Transport ==
Dhupguri CD block has 7 originating/ terminating bus routes.

NH 17 passes through the block.

== Education ==
In 2013-14, Dhupguri CD block had 191 primary schools with 28,238 students, 8 middle schools with 2,091 students, 10 high schools with 10,991 students and 25 higher secondary schools with 34,413 students. Dhupguri CD block had 1 technical/ professional institutions with 130 students and 912 institutions for special and non-formal education with 55,960 students.

See also – Education in India

According to the 2011 census, in the Dhupguri CD block, among the 98 inhabited villages, 4 villages did not have schools, 63 villages had two or more primary schools, 36 villages had at least 1 primary and 1 middle school and 16 villages had at least 1 middle and 1 secondary school.

Kabi Sukanta Mahavidyalaya was established in 1981.Affiliated with the University of North Bengal, it offers courses in arts and commerce.

Dhupguri Girls’ College was established at in 2013. Affiliated with the University of North Bengal, it offers courses in arts.

== Healthcare ==
In 2014, Dhupguri CD block had 4 primary health centres, 1 central government medical institution and 9 NGO/ private nursing home with total 421 beds and 25 doctors (excluding private bodies). Dhupguri municipal area (located outside the block) had 1 rural hospital with 70 beds and 6 doctors. It had 46 family welfare subcentres. 11,901 patients were treated indoor and 148,141 patients were treated outdoor in the hospitals, health centres and subcentres of the CD block.

Dhupguri Rural Hospital, with 30 beds at Dhupguri, is the major government medical facility in the Dhupguri CD block. There are primary health centres at Jhar Altargram (PO Dankanmari) (with 4 beds), Sakarjhora (PO Sajnapara) (with 4 beds), Duramari (Salbari) (with 6 beds).
