= Banarhat =

- Census Town
- Location in West Bengal, India Banarhat (India) Banarhat (Asia)
- Coordinates: 26.78814°N 89.0408°E
- Country: India
- State: West Bengal
- District: Jalpaiguri
- Block: Banarhat
- Elevation: 161 m (528 ft)

Population (2011)
  - Total: 15,642

Languages
  - Official: Bengali, English
- Time zone: UTC+5:30 (IST)
- PIN: 735202
- Telephone code: 03563
- Vehicle registration: WB
- Lok Sabha constituency: Jalpaiguri (SC)
- Vidhan Sabha constituency: Dhupguri (SC)
- Website: jalpaiguri.gov.in

Banarhat is a census town of the Banarhat CD block in Dhupguri subdivision of the Jalpaiguri District in the state of West Bengal, India. Sharing nearest international border with Bhutan.

== Geography ==
Places and tea estates in Jalpaiguri Sadar subdivision (including Rajganj, Jalpaiguri, Maynaguri and Dhupguri CD blocks) in Jalpaiguri district
CT: census town, R: rural/ urban centre, N: neighbourhood, C: cantonment, NP: national park/ wildlife sanctuary, TE: tea estate
Abbreviations used in names – TG for Tea Garden (town/village), TE for Tea Estate, JRS: junction railway station
Owing to space constraints in the small map, the actual locations in a larger map may vary slightly

=== Area overview ===
The map alongside shows the alluvial floodplains south of the outer foothills of the Himalayas. The area is mostly flat, except for low hills in the northern portions. It is a primarily rural area with 62.01% of the population living in rural areas and a moderate 37.99% living in the urban areas. Tea gardens in the Dooars and Terai regions produce 226 million kg or over a quarter of India's total tea crop. Some tea gardens were identified in the 2011 census as census towns or villages. Such places are marked in the map as CT (census town) or R (rural/ urban centre). Specific tea estate pages are marked TE.

Note: The map alongside presents some of the notable locations in the subdivision. All places marked in the map are linked in the larger full screen map.

=== Gram Panchayats ===
Gram panchayats surrounding Banarhat Town are: Banarhat I, Banarhat II, Chamurchi, and Binnaguri.

== Civic administration ==
=== Police station ===
Banarhat police has jurisdiction over Banarhat CD block and parts of Dhupguri & Nagrakata CD blocks.

== Demographics ==
According to the 2011 Census of India, Banarhat had a total population of 15,642 of which 7,965 (51%) were males and 7,687 (49%) were females. There were 1,759 persons in the age range of 0 to 6 years. The total number of literate people in Banarhat was 10,298 (74.12% of the population over 6 years).

As of 2001 India census, Banarhat Town had a population of 14,431. Males constitute 52% of the population and females 48%. Banarhat has an average literacy rate of 55%, lower than the national average of 59.5%; with 59% of the males and 41% of females literate. 14% of the population is under 6 years of age.

== Transport ==
Banarhat is connected by State road to the district city of Jalpaiguri and other nearby towns of Dhupguri, Gairkata, Mainaguri, etc. It lies on National Highway 31C, which crosses the Teesta river at the Coronation Bridge, Siliguri, Oodlabari, Malbazar, Birpara, Hasimara, Alipurduar and beyond.

Banarhat Railway Station the important railway station: Banarhat (Code: BNQ, Railway Zone: Northeast Frontier) - on the New Jalpaiguri-Alipurduar-Samuktala Road Line.

== Education ==
Banarhat Kartik Oraon Hindi Government College was established at Banarhat in 2014. Affiliated with the North Bengal University, it is a Hindi-medium institution offering courses in arts and science.
