= Dakshin Odlabari =

- Census Town
- Location in West Bengal, India Dakshin Odlabari (India)
- Coordinates: 26.8421°N 88.6170°E
- Country: India
- State: West Bengal
- District: Jalpaiguri

Area
  - Total: 6.0117 km^{2} (2.3211 sq mi)

Population (2011)
  - Total: 4,997
  - Density: 831.2/km^{2} (2,153/sq mi)
- Time zone: UTC+5:30 (IST)
- PIN: 735222
- Telephone/STD code: 03562
- Vehicle registration: WB
- Lok Sabha constituency: Jalpaiguri
- Vidhan Sabha constituency: Mal
- Website: jalpaiguri.gov.in

Dakshin Odlabari is a census town in the Mal CD block in the Malbazar subdivision of the Jalpaiguri district in the state of West Bengal, India.

== Geography ==
Places and tea estates in Malbabazar subdivision (including Mal, Nagrakata and Matiali CD blocks) in Jalpaiguri district
CT: census town, R: rural/ urban centre, N: neighbourhood, NP: national park/ wildlife sanctuary, TE: tea estate
Abbreviations used in names – TG for Tea Garden (town/village), TE for Tea Estate, JRS: junction railway station
Owing to space constraints in the small map, the actual locations in a larger map may vary slightly

=== Location ===
Dakshin Odlabari is located at 26.8421°N 88.6170°E.

=== Area overview ===
Gorumara National Park has overtaken traditionally popular Jaldapara National Park in footfall and Malbazar has emerged as one of the most important towns in the Dooars. Malbazar subdivision is presented in the map alongside. It is a predominantly rural area with 88.62% of the population living in rural areas and 11.32% living in the urban areas. Tea gardens in the Dooars and Terai regions produce 226 million kg or over a quarter of India's total tea crop. Some tea gardens were identified in the 2011 census as census towns or villages. Such places are marked in the map as CT (census town) or R (rural/ urban centre). Specific tea estate pages are marked TE.

Note: The map alongside presents some of the notable locations in the subdivision. All places marked in the map are linked in the larger full screen map.

== Demographics ==
As per the 2011 Census of India, Dakshin Odlabari had a total population of 4,997. There were 2,525 (51%) males and 2,472 (49%) females. There were 660 persons in the age range of 0 to 6 years. The total number of literate people in Dakshin Odlabari was 3,125 (72.05% of the population over 6 years).

== Infrastructure ==
According to the District Census Handbook 2011, Jalpaiguri, Dakshin Odlabari covered an area of 6.0117 km^{2}. Among the civic amenities, it had 12 km roads with open drains, the protected water supply involved river infiltration gallery, service reservoir, uncovered well. It had 125 domestic electric connections. Among the medical facilities it had 1 dispensary/ health centre, 3 medicine shops. Among the educational facilities it had 3 primary schools, 1 middle school.
