= Sukra Munda =

Indian politician

Member of the West Bengal Legislative Assembly
- Incumbent
- Assumed office 9 May 2026
- Preceded by: Bulu Chik Baraik
- Constituency: Mal
- In office 31 May 2016 – 4 May 2021
- Preceded by: Joseph Munda
- Succeeded by: Puna Bhengra
- Constituency: Nagrakata

Personal details
- Party: Bharatiya Janata Party (2020-present)
- Other political affiliations: All India Trinamool Congress(until 2020)
- Occupation: Politician

Sukra Munda is an Indian politician from the state of West Bengal. He is a member of the West Bengal Legislative Assembly. He represented the Nagrakata constituency in Jalpaiguri district after winning the 2016 West Bengal Legislative Assembly election. He resigned from the party on 19 December 2020 and joined the Bharatiya Janata Party.

State Legislative Assembly
Preceded by Joseph Munda	Member of the West Bengal Legislative Assembly from Nagrakata Assembly constituency 2016–	Incumbent
