= Gurjangjhora Tea Garden =

- Village
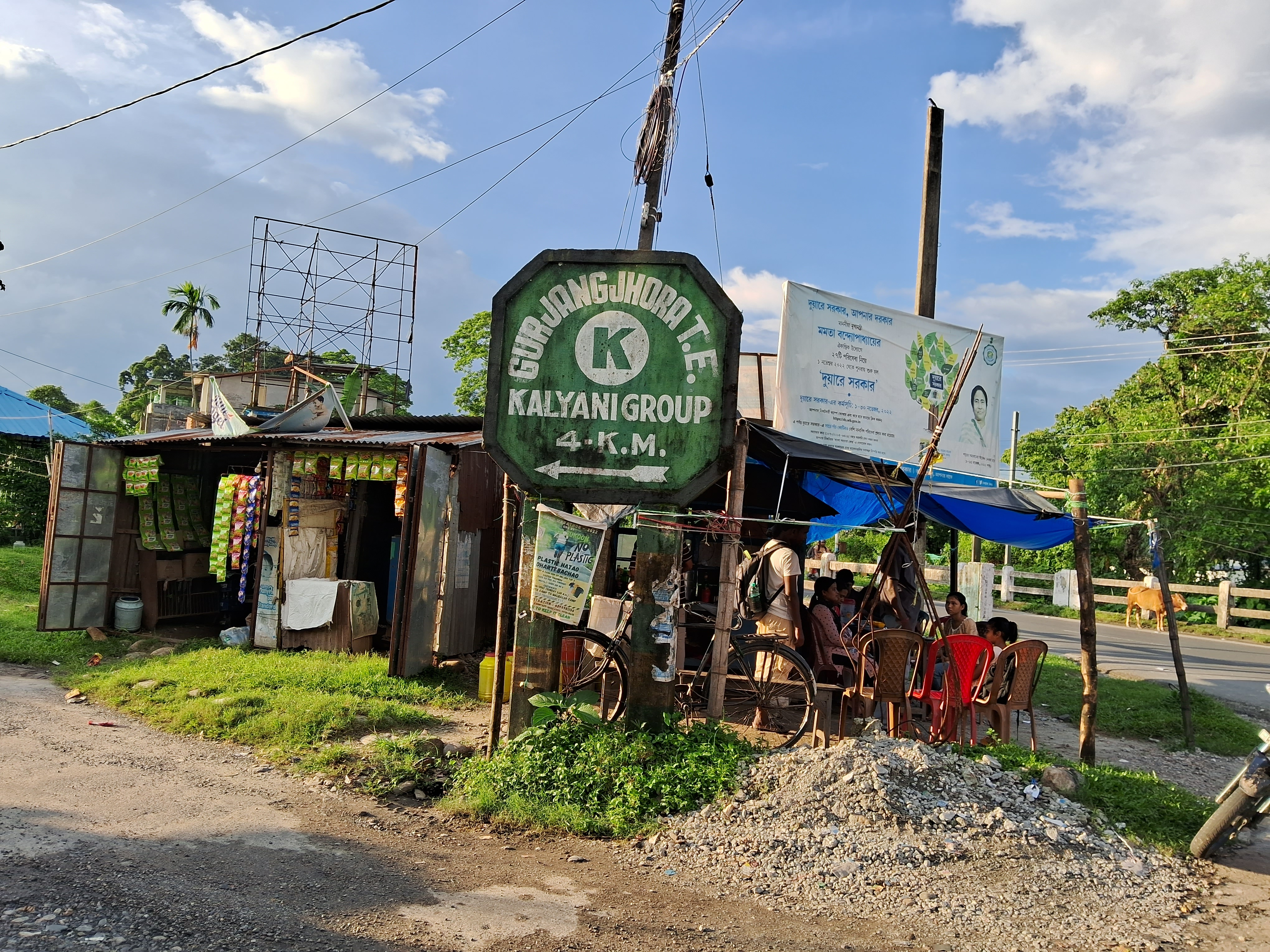

- Location in West Bengal, India Gurjangjhora Tea Garden (India)
- Coordinates: 26.90934°N 88.7275°E
- Country: India
- State: West Bengal
- District: Jalpaiguri

Population (2011)
  - Total: 2,423
- Time zone: UTC+5:30 (IST)
- PIN: 735223
- Telephone/STD code: 03562
- Vehicle registration: WB
- Lok Sabha constituency: Jalpaiguri
- Vidhan Sabha constituency: Mal
- Website: jalpaiguri.gov.in

Gurjangjhora Tea Garden (also written as Gurjang Jhora) is a village in the Mal CD block in the Malbazar subdivision of the Jalpaiguri district in the state of West Bengal, India.

== Geography ==
Places and tea estates in Malbabazar subdivision (including Mal, Nagrakata and Matiali CD blocks) in Jalpaiguri district
CT: census town, R: rural/ urban centre, N: neighbourhood, NP: national park/ wildlife sanctuary, TE: tea estate
Abbreviations used in names – TG for Tea Garden (town/village), TE for Tea Estate, JRS: junction railway station
Owing to space constraints in the small map, the actual locations in a larger map may vary slightly

=== Location ===
Gurjangjhora Tea Garden is located at 26.9034°N 88.7275°E.

=== Area overview ===
Gorumara National Park has overtaken traditionally popular Jaldapara National Park in footfall and Malbazar has emerged as one of the most important towns in the Dooars. Malbazar subdivision is presented in the map alongside. It is a predominantly rural area with 88.62% of the population living in rural areas and 11.32% living in the urban areas. Tea gardens in the Dooars and Terai regions produce 226 million kg or over a quarter of India's total tea crop. Some tea gardens were identified in the 2011 census as census towns or villages. Such places are marked in the map as CT (census town) or R (rural/ urban centre). Specific tea estate pages are marked TE.

Note: The map alongside presents some of the notable locations in the subdivision. All places marked in the map are linked in the larger full screen map.

== Demographics ==
As per the 2011 Census of India, Gurjang Jhora Tea Garden had a total population of 2,423. There were 1,224 (51%) males and 1,199 (49%) females. There were 278 persons in the age range of 0 to 6 years. The total number of literate people in Gurjang Jhora was 1,469 (68.48% of the population over 6 years).

== Economy ==
Gurjangjhora Tea & Industries Ltd., now a part of the Kalyani group, was incorporated in 1882. Located 3 km from Malbazar, it covers a gross area of 806 acres and produces 1.2 million kgs of tea annually. One of the oldest tea companies in India, it employs 700 workers. other tea estates of the Kalyani group in the Dooars region are Saraswatipur Tea Estate and Choulbari Tea Estate.

== Dooars-Terai tea gardens ==
Tea gardens in the Dooars and Terai regions produce 226 million kg or over a quarter of India's total tea crop. The Dooars region contains wild-life rich tropical forests, undulating plains and low hills. Innumerable streams and rivers descend from the mountains of Bhutan and flow through the fertile plains in the Dooars region. The elevation of the Dooars area ranges from 90 to 1,750 metres (300 to 5,740 ft) and it receives around 350 cm of rain. The Dooars-Terai tea is characterized by a bright, smooth and full-bodied liquor that's a wee bit lighter than Assam tea. Cultivation of tea in the Dooars was primarily pioneered and promoted by the British but there was significant contribution of Indian entrepreneurs.
