= Prem Oraon =

Indian politician and trade unionist

Member of the West Bengal Legislative Assembly for Nagrakata
- In office 1972–1977
- Preceded by: Punai Oraon
- Succeeded by: Punai Oraon

Personal details
- Born: Pilkhi, Bengal Presidency, British India
- Political party: Communist Party of India
- Spouse: Kamila
- Children: 5
- Occupation: Labourer; trade unionist; politician

Prem Oraon was an Indian politician and trade unionist. He was a leader of tea garden workers in North Bengal, and was a member of the West Bengal Legislative Assembly from 1972 to 1977.

== Entry into trade unionism ==
Oraon was born in Pilkhi village near Ranchi, the son of Bhaku Oraon. He studied up to fifth grade at home. As thousands of other Chota Nagpur and Santal Paragana Adivasis, he migrated to work at tea gardens in North Bengal. At the Kurty Tea Estate where he was working, around 80% of the workers were Chota Nagpur and Santhal Paragana Adivasis and 20% Nepalis. In 1950 a socialist trade union, West Bengal Cha Shramik Union (WBCSU), was formed at the Kurty Tea Estate. In the same year, a team led by communist organiser Debprosad Ghosh (Patalbabu) arrived in the area and began holding meetings, selling literature and distributing Sadri language leaflets to the workers there. Oroan was one of the workers who got in contact with the communist organisers, and he formed a trade union that unsuccessfully sought to challenge the WBCSU.

== ZCBWU leader ==
In 1960, Oraon became a member of the Communist Party of India. In 1966 a branch of the All India Trade Union Congress-affiliated Zilla Cha Bagan Workers Union (ZCBWU) was set up at Kurty Tea Estate. ZCBWU organised a gherao at the company offices and a strike in January 1966, to which the tea garden management responded with dismissals of workers. In 1969 the ZCBWU organised a two-week long strike. Oraon, the garden secretary of ZCBWU, emerged as a popular leader of the Kurty Tea Estate workers and was noted for his charisma. The socialists gradually lost their foothold at the Kurty Tea Estate. In 1970 the Kurty Tea Estate management planned to shut down its tea leaf processing factory and instead ship green tea leaves to another plant. Oraon organised a protest movement, picketing the tea garden for two weeks before the management withdrew plans for factory closure. He lost his right leg during this protest, trying to drive away a tractor.

== Legislator ==
Oraon was elected to the West Bengal Legislative Assembly in the 1972 election from the Nagrakata constituency, obtaining 21,429 votes (57.16%) against 14,463 votes (38.58%) for the incumbent CPI(M) legislator Punai Oraon. In July 1972 the Governor of West Bengal appointed Oraon to the West Bengal Tribes Advisory Council.

CPI fielded Oraon as its candidate in the Mal constituency in the 1977 West Bengal Legislative Assembly election, finishing in fourth place with 4,816 votes (12.10%).

== Personal life ==
He was married to Kamila, and the couple had four sons and one daughter. He lived at the Nageswari Tea Garden in Jalpaiguri district.

== See also ==
- Kurukh people
