= Kalagaity =

- Village
- Location in West Bengal, India Kalagaity (India)
- Coordinates: 26.85°N 88.75°E
- Country: India
- State: West Bengal
- District: Jalpaiguri

Population (2011)
  - Total: 301

Languages
  - Official: Bengali, English
- Time zone: UTC+5:30 (IST)
- PIN: 734501 (Kalagaity)
- Lok Sabha constituency: Jalpaiguri
- Vidhan Sabha constituency: Mal

Kalagaity is a village located in Mal (community development block) in the Jalpaiguri district in the state of West Bengal, India.
