= Jalpaiguri Municipality =

Civic body in West Bengal, India

Coordinates: 26.51900°N 88.72777°E

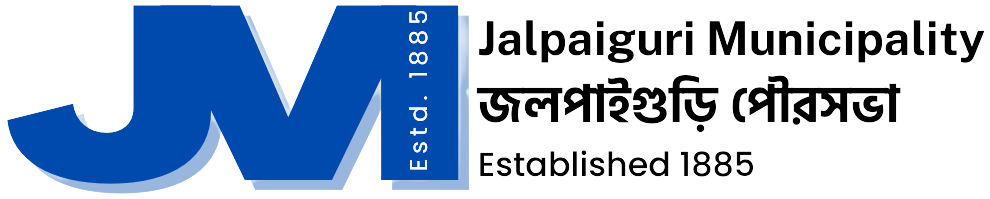

Type
- Type: Municipality

History
- Founded: 1885; 141 years ago

Leadership
- Chairman: Vacant; Since 27 August 2026
- Vice Chairman: Vacant; Since 27 August 2026
- Executive Officer: Janab Moin Ahamd, I.A.S. (Officiating as Administrator Since 27 August 2026)

Structure
- Seats: 25
- Political groups: Government (22): AITC (22); Opposition (3): INC (2); CPI(M) (1)

Elections
- Last election: 2022
- Next election: 2027

Meeting place
- Jalpaiguri Municipality Office

Website
- Official Website

Jalpaiguri Municipality is the civic body that governs Jalpaiguri and its surrounding areas in Jalpaiguri Sadar subdivision of Jalpaiguri district in West Bengal, India. Following the resignation of Saikat Chatterjee on 27 August 2026, the Municipality Board is presently headed by the SDO & SDM of Jalpaiguri Subdivision, Janab Moin Ahamd, IAS, who was appointed as 'Officiating Administrator on the same day

== History ==
The name Jalpaiguri comes from the word Jalpai meaning Ceylon olive, which grew in the city and adjacent areas and Guri means a place.

== Civic administration ==
Civic administration is the responsibility of the Jalpaiguri Municipality which is one of the oldest in West Bengal. Set up in 1885, it is headed by a chairman who is elected by the residents of the city. It has 25 wards that elect the ward councillors. The All India Trinamool Congress is in the power of this municipal body. The chairperson of the municipality is Saikat Chatterjee.

The municipality is responsible for providing basic services, such as potable water and sanitation. The water is supplied by the municipal authorities using its groundwater resources, and almost all the houses in the municipal area are connected through the system.

== Elections ==
Jalpaiguri Municipality has 25 wards.

=== 2022 West Bengal Municipality election ===
22	2	1
AITC	INC	CPI(M)

Party	AITC	INC	CPI(M)
Seats
Seats	22 / 25	2 / 25	1 / 25

In the 2022 municipal elections for Jalpaiguri Municipality, AITC won 22 seats, INC 2 seats and CPI(M) 1 seat.

=== 2015 West Bengal Municipality election ===
15	5	5
AITC	INC	CPI(M)

Party	AITC	INC	CPI(M)
Seats
Seats	15 / 25	5 / 25	5 / 25

In the 2015 municipal elections for Jalpaiguri Municipality, AITC won 15 seats, INC 5 seats and CPI(M) 5 seats.

=== 2010 West Bengal Municipality election ===
16	7	1
INC	CPI(M)	AITC

Party	INC	CPI(M)	AITC
Seats
Seats	16 / 25	7 / 25	1 / 25

In the 2010 municipal elections for Jalpaiguri Municipality, INC won 16 seats, CPI(M) 7 seats and AITC 1 seat.

== List of councillors ==
Following is the list of councillors of Jalpaiguri Municipality at present:

Ward No.	Name of councillor	Party
1	Nilam Chakraborty (Sharma)	AITC
2	Mahua Dutta Bandopadhyay (Mun)	AITC
3	Swarup Mandal	AITC
4	Sarita Prasad (Shah) Gupta	AITC
5	Sandip Mahato	AITC
6	Subrata Pal	AITC
7	Papia Pal	AITC
8	Saikat Chatterjee	AITC
9	Pramod Mandal	AITC
10	Dinesh Raut	AITC
11	Manashi Biswas Roy	AITC
12	Manindra Nath Barman	AITC
13	Lipika Sarkar	AITC
14	Sandip Ghosh	AITC
15	Tapan Banerjee	AITC
16	Tiyash Sinha Goswami	AITC
17	Dilip Kumar Barma	AITC
18	Uttam Bose	AITC
19	Lopamudra Adhikari Mandal	AITC
20	Shubhra Deb	INC
21	Taraknath Das	AITC
22	Pinku Biswas	AITC
23	Sanchita Panchanan (Dhar)	CPI(M)
24	Amlan Munshi	INC
25	Poushali Das (Sarkar)	AITC

== See also ==
- List of municipal corporations in India
