= Debesh Roy =

Bengali writer and scholar from India (1936–2020)

- Born: 17 December 1936; Pabna, British India
- Died: 14 May 2020 (age 83); Kolkata, West Bengal, India
- Education: Ananda Chandra College, University of Calcutta
- Occupations: Writer, Scholar
- Awards: Sahitya Akademi Award (1990)

Debesh Roy (17 December 1936 – 14 May 2020) was an Indian Bengali language writer and scholar. He is best known for his Sahitya Akademi Award-winning novel Teesta Parer Brittanta (1990).

== Early life and education ==
Roy was born in Pabna in British India. His family came to Jalpaiguri on 17 December 1936. His father was Khistish Roy and his mother was Aparna Roy. He had his schooling from Ananda Model School, Jalpaiguri. He graduated from Ananda Chandra College in Jalpaiguri. From the time he was a student, Roy worked in the student wing of Communist Party of India. During his such association, he learned the Rajbanshi dialect. In 1956, while studying at Calcutta University, he took part in mainstream left-wing politics.

== Career ==
Roy was also involved with the trade union movement in Kolkata. He worked as a research fellow in the Centre for Studies in Social Science. He made his debut in the literary scene in 1955 in Desh magazine. His first book was Jajati. During his five decades-long writing career, Roy was remembered for numerous books, including Borisaler Jogen Mondal, Manush Khun Kore Keno, Samay Asamayer Brittanto, and Lagan Gandhar. Roy's life and works were inspired by the Teesta river-based Rajbanshi Community of North Bengal. He received the Sahitya Academy award in 1990 for his epic novel Teesta Parer Brittanto. He was also honoured by Bhasa Sahitya Parishad and Bhualka Purashkar.

== Publications ==
- Jajati
- Teesta Parer Brittanto
- Borisaler Jogen Mondal
- Manush Khun Kore Keno
- Samay Asamayer Brittanto
- Lagan Gandhar
- Attiyo Brittanto
- Mafassali Brittanto
- Tistapuran
- Angina
- Itihaser Lokjon
- Udbasu

== Death ==
Roy suffered a massive cardiac arrest and died on 14 May 2020 at a private hospital in Kolkata.
