= Bikash Sarkar =

Bengali writer

Bikash Sarkar (Bengali: বিকাশ সরকার; born 27 May 1965 in Gairkata গয়েরকাটা) is a Bengali poet, writer, journalist and editor. He is a recipient of the prestigious Jugasankha Award 2010.

== Biography ==
Born in Gairkata, a suburb in Dooars region of West Bengal in the year 1965, Bikash Sarkar started writing poetry at a very early age. Later on, he also successfully tried his hand in writing stories and novels. Recently three of his books, ‘Bishaadbaalok’, ‘Anantachhutor’ and ‘Aaanandadotara’ have been published by Ananda Publishers. His first book of poem ‘Kanisker Matha’ (The Head of Kaniska) was published in 1983, when he was just 17 years old and now he has 23 books to his credit – 13 of poems, two collection of short stories, four of translations and four of novels. His poems have been translated into English, Assamese, Nepali and Hindi and published in several journals and anthologies. Bikash Sarkar was the editor of Masik Jugasankha, a Bengali monthly magazine. Now he is Assistant Editor of Dainik Jugasankha. Earlier he edited two little magazines named ‘Thaba’ and ‘Lekhakarmee’. He married Krishna Dey and his daughter is Bipasha, who is a teacher.

=== Awards and honours ===
- Sundarimohan Das Award 2000
- Srijon Somman 2006
- Jugasankha Award 2010
- Assam Bhasa Gourav Somman, Govt. of Assam, 2021
- Srot Somman 2022

==== List of publications ====
- KANISKER MATHA (কনিষ্কের মাথা) Poems 1983
- PREMIK PREMIKADER JONYO (প্রেমিক-প্রেমিকাদের জন্য) Poems 1985
- PHnASIGAACHH (ফাঁসিগাছ) Poems 1987
- LENDU ROYER JIJEEBISHA (লেন্দু রায়ের জিজীবিষা) Novel 1995
- JAAKE DEKHAMATRO GULI KORA HOBE (যাকে দেখামাত্র গুলি করা হবে) Short Stories 1996
- KANISKER MATHA O ONYANYO KOBITA (কনিষ্কের মাথা ও অন্যান্য কবিতা) Poems 1999
- JAADUR GAHANA AAKHAA (জাদুর গহন আখা) Poems 2000
- AAGUNER SnEK (আগুনের সেঁক) Novel 2007
- GAIRKATASAMAGRA (গয়েরকাটাসমগ্র) Poems 2007
- BISHAADBALOK (বিষাদবালক) Poems 2008 ISBN 978-81-7756-719-9
- NIRBACHITO KOBITA (নির্বাচিত কবিতা) Poems 2009 ISBN 81-89742-78-7
- ANANTACHHUTOR (অনন্তছুতোর) Poems 2010 ISBN 978-81-7756-895-0
- AANANDADOTAARAA (আনন্দদোতারা) Poems 2012 ISBN 978-93-5040-134-7
- NEELONTHEE BROJO (নীলকণ্ঠী ব্রজ) Translation 2013 ISBN 978-93-82250-91-3
- APARUP KATHA 1, 2, 3 (অপরূপ কথা ১, ২, ৩) Translation of Fairy Tales, 3 Volume) 2014
- MANASAMANGAL (মনসামঙ্গল) Short Stories 2015
- ASTRO (অস্ত্র) ISBN 978-93-84186-05-0Novel 2015
- SHRESTHO KOBITA (শ্রেষ্ঠ কবিতা)ISBN 978-93-80904-85-6 Collection of Best Poems, 2017
- BIKASHJEEVON (বিকাশজীবন) ISBN 978-93-87715-03-5 A Collection of writings about Bikash Sarkar, Edited by Gobinda Dhar 2018
- LENDU ROYER JIJIBEESHA (লেন্দু রায়ের জিজীবিষা) ISBN 978-93-87715-57-8 A collection of two Novels, 2020
- HALLUCINATION SERIES (হ্যালুসিনেশন সিরিজ) ISBN 978-93-87715-72-1 Poems 2020
- GOLPOSOMOGRO 1 (গল্পসমগ্র ১) ISBN 978-81-947871-5-0 Collection of Short Stories 2021
- MUKHOMUKHI BIKASH SARKAR (মুখোমুখি বিকাশ সরকার) ISBN 978-81-947871-9-8 Collection of Interviews 2021
- DHnADHAADHONDO (ধাঁধাধন্দ) ISBN 978-93-93731-29-6 Crime Thriller 2021
- AATMOJEEVONEER PORABASTOB (আত্মজীবনীর পরাবাস্তব) ISBN 978-93-93293-17-6 Poems 2021
- 100 PREMER KOBITA (১০০ প্রেমের কবিতা) ISBN 978-93-94716-04-9 One Hundred Love Poems 2022
- UPONYAS SANGRAHA (উপন্যাস সংগ্ৰহ) ISBN 978-93-94716-025 Collection of Novels 2022
