= Sakati Jhakua Para =

Sakati সাকাতি is a village of about 1,500 people situated near the India–Bangladesh border. This Rajbanshi রাজবংশী based village is populated mainly by Hindus but many Muslims also live here. It has two main rivulets named Yamuna যমুনা and Shoula শৌলা. It is one of the decent tourist spots of Jalpaiguri জলপাইগুড়ি, and has approximately 152 bighas of Tea Garden. Most of the people earn their bread and butter as tea labour and others choose to go to other states as labours.

As per education facilities there are two primary Schools, 1 SSK (Shishu Shiksha Kendra), 1 upper primary school nearby.

A little fair named Dhologram Baruni Mela ঢোলগ্রাম বারুণী মেলা is situated near distance. A country fair to celebrate the holy ceremony of MadhuKrishna Trayodashi মধু কৃষ্ন ত্রয়োদশী.
