= Mal (community development block) =

- Community development block
- Coordinates: 26.85°N 88.75°E
- Country: India
- State: West Bengal
- District: Jalpaiguri

Area
  - Total: 545.90 km^{2} (210.77 sq mi)

Population (2011)
  - Total: 299,556
  - Density: 548.74/km^{2} (1,421.2/sq mi)

Languages
  - Official: Bengali, English
- Time zone: UTC+5:30 (IST)
- Lok Sabha constituency: Jalpaiguri
- Vidhan Sabha constituency: Mal
- Website: jalpaiguri.gov.in

Mal is a community development block (CD block) that forms an administrative division in the Malbazar subdivision of the Jalpaiguri district in the Indian state of West Bengal.

== Geography ==
Malbazar is located at 26°51′N 88°45′E.

The Mal CD block lies in the north-western part of the district. The Teesta River flows along the western and southern boundary of the district, the Mal River flows along a portion of the eastern boundary. The northern portion has hilly terrain which is part of the sub-Himalayan ranges, the southern portion is part of the central tract, locally called Bhaber.

The Mal CD block is bounded by the Kalimpong I and Gorubathan CD blocks in Kalimpong district on the north, Matiali CD block on the east, Kranti CD block on the south, and Rajganj CD block on the west.

The Mal CD block has an area of 545.90 km^{2}. It has 1 panchayat samity, 6 gram panchayats, 196 gram sansads (village councils), 106 mouzas, 100 inhabited villages and 2 census towns. Mal police station serves this block. Headquarters of this CD block is at Mal.

Gram panchayats of Mal block/ panchayat samiti are: Bagrakote, Damdim, Kumlai, Odlabari, Rungamati and Tesimla.

== Demographics ==
=== Population ===
According to the 2011 Census of India, the Mal CD block had a total population of 299,556, of which 275,384 were rural, and 24,172 were urban. There were 151,826 (51%) males and 147,730 (49%) females. There were 19,208 persons in the age range of 0 to 6 years. The Scheduled Castes numbered 80,400 (26.84%) and the Scheduled Tribes numbered 103,356 (34.50%).

According to the 2001 census, Mal block had a total population of 264,711, out of which 134,956 were males and 129,755 were females. Mal block registered a population growth of 15.09 per cent during the 1991-2001 decade.

Census towns in the Mal CD block are (2011 census figures in brackets): Odlabari (14,194), Dakshin Odlabari (4,997).

Large villages (with 4,000+ population) in the Mal CD block are (2011 census figures in brackets): Washabari Tea Garden (4,101), Lishriver Tea Garden (6,903), Bagrakot Tea Garden (9,971), Gojaldoba Tea Garden (5,184), Odlabari Tea Garden (4,384), Patharjora Tea Garden (4,335), Menglass Tea Garden (4,369), Rangamati Tea Garden (8,607), Syli Tea Garden (4,751), Ranichera Tea Garden (5,088), Damdim Tea Garden (8,451), Kumlai Tea Garden (4,299), Tesimala (4,785), Haihaipathar (6,831), Bainguri Tea Garden (6,742), Bara Ghoria (4,063), Annandapur Tea Garden (4,104), Dakshin Hanskhali (7,771), Jogesh Chandra Tea Garden (4,881), Neorandi Tea Garden (4,077), Kranti (5,961), Uttar Khalpara (4,117), Uttar Saripakuri (4,270), Uttar Matiali (4,371), Jhar Matiali (6,493) and Dakshin Matiali (4,068).

Other villages in the Mal CD block include (2011 census figures in brackets): Gurjangjhora Tea Garden (2,423).

=== Literacy ===
According to the 2011 census, the total number of literate persons in the Mal CD block was 172,753 (66.31% of the population over 6 years) out of which males numbered 97,994 (74.23% of the male population over 6 years) and females numbered 74,759 (58.17% of the female population over 6 years). The gender disparity (the difference between female and male literacy rates) was 16.06%.

See also – List of West Bengal districts ranked by literacy rate

Literacy in CD blocks of
Jalpaiguri district
Jalpaiguri Sadar subdivision
Rajganj – 62.82%
Jalpaiguri – 73.81%
Maynaguri – 75.63%
Dhupguri – 60.57%
Malbazar subdivision
Mal – 66.31
Matiali – 66.98%
Nagrakata – 61.27%
Alipurduar subdivision
Madarihat-Birpara – 67.77%
Kalchini – 68.96%
Kumargram – 72.42%
Alipurduar I – 78.19%
Alipurduar II – 75.76%
Falakata – 72.64%
2011 Census: CD Block Wise

Primary Census Abstract Data

=== Language and religion ===
Religion in Mal CD block (2011)
Hinduism	69.28%
Islam	19.56%
Christianity	8.33%
Tribal religion	1.38%
Buddhism	1.25%
Other or not stated	0.20%

In the 2011 Census of India, Hindus numbered 207,524 and formed 69.28% of the population of Mal CD block. Muslims numbered 58,592 and formed 19.56% of the population. Christians numbered 24,958 and formed 8.33% of the population. Others numbered 8,482 and formed 2.83% of the population. Others include Addi Bassi, Marang Boro, Santal, Saranath, Sari Dharma, Sarna, Alchchi, Bidin, Sant, Saevdharm, Seran, Saran, Sarin, Kheria, and other religious communities.

Languages of Mal CD block (2011)
1. Bengali (43.9%)
2. Sadri (29.6%)
3. Nepali (8.97%)
4. Kurukh (4.23%)
5. Rajbongshi (3.93%)
6. Hindi (2.38%)
7. Santali (1.24%)
8. 'Other' Bengali (1.11%)
9. Mundari (1.07%)
10. Others (3.57%)

At the time of the 2011 census, 43.94% of the population spoke Bengali, 29.56% Sadri, 8.97% Nepali, 4.23% Kurukh, 3.93% Rajbongshi, 2.38% Hindi, 1.24% Santali and 1.07% Mundari as their first language. 1.11% of the population were recorded as speaking 'Others' under Bengali.

== Poverty level ==
Based on a study of the per capita consumption in rural and urban areas, using central sample data of NSS 55th Round 1999–2000, Jalpaiguri district was found to have relatively high rates of poverty of 35.73% in rural areas and 61.53% in the urban areas. It was one of the few districts where urban poverty rate was higher than the rural poverty rate.

According to a World Bank report, as of 2012, 26-31% of the population of Jalpaiguri, Bankura and Paschim Medinipur districts were below poverty line, a relatively high level of poverty in West Bengal, which had an average 20% of the population below poverty line.

== Economy ==
=== Livelihood ===
Livelihood
in Mal CD block
1. Cultivators (12.1%)
2. Agricultural labourers (20.9%)
3. Household industries (1.70%)
4. Other Workers (65.3%)

In the Mal CD block in 2011, among the class of total workers, cultivators numbered 13,740 and formed 12.09%, agricultural labourers numbered 23,731 and formed 20.88%, household industry workers numbered 1,929 and formed 1.70% and other workers numbered 74,258 and formed 65.33%. Total workers numbered 113,658 and formed 37.94% of the total population, and non-workers numbered 185,898 and formed 62.06% of the population.

Note: In the census records a person is considered a cultivator, if the person is engaged in cultivation/ supervision of land owned by self/government/institution. When a person who works on another person's land for wages in cash or kind or share, is regarded as an agricultural labourer. Household industry is defined as an industry conducted by one or more members of the family within the household or village, and one that does not qualify for registration as a factory under the Factories Act. Other workers are persons engaged in some economic activity other than cultivators, agricultural labourers and household workers. It includes factory, mining, plantation, transport and office workers, those engaged in business and commerce, teachers, entertainment artistes and so on.

=== Infrastructure ===
There are 100 inhabited villages in the Mal CD block, as per the District Census Handbook, Jalpaiguri, 2011. 100% villages have power supply. 98 villages (98.00%) have drinking water supply. 26 villages (26.00%) have post offices. 93 villages (93.00%) have telephones (including landlines, public call offices and mobile phones). 57 villages (57.00%) have pucca (paved) approach roads and 43 villages (43.00%) have transport communication (includes bus service, rail facility and navigable waterways). 1 village (1.00%) has an agricultural credit societies and 13 villages (13.00%) have banks.

=== Agriculture ===
The economy of the Jalpaiguri district is mainly dependent on agriculture and plantations, and majority of the people are engaged in agriculture. Jalpaiguri is well-known for tea and timber. Other important crops are paddy, jute, tobacco, mustard seeds, sugarcane and wheat. The annual average rainfall is 3,440 mm, around double of that of Kolkata and the surrounding areas. The area is flood prone and the rivers often change course causing immense damage to crops and cultivated lands.

In 2013-14, there were 69 fertiliser depots, 23 seed stores and 54 fair price shops in the Mal CD block.

In 2013–14, the Mal CD block produced 23,528 tonnes of Aman paddy, the main winter crop, from 11,274 hectares, 1,131 tonnes of Boro paddy (spring crop) from 605 hectares, 2,229 tonnes of Aus paddy (summer crop) from 991 hectares, 890 tonnes of wheat from 570 hectares, 407 tonnes of maize from 191 hectares, 17,710 tonnes of jute from 1,434 hectares, 17,449 tonnes of potatoes from 810 hectares and 1,433 tonnes of sugarcane from 14 hectares. It also produced pulses and oilseeds.

In 2013-14, the total area irrigated in the Mal CD block was 9,394 hectares, out of which 4,368 hectares were irrigated by canal water, 116 hectares by tank water, 1,440 hectares by river lift irrigation, 80 hectares by deep tube wells and 3,390 hectares by shallow tube wells.

=== Dooars-Terai tea gardens ===
Tea gardens in the Dooars and Terai regions produce 226 million kg or over a quarter of India's total tea crop.. The Dooars-Terai tea is characterized by a bright, smooth and full-bodied liquor that's a wee bit lighter than Assam tea. Cultivation of tea in the Dooars was primarily pioneered and promoted by the British but there was significant contribution of Indian entrepreneurs.

=== Banking ===
In 2013-14, Mal CD block had offices of 8 commercial banks and 4 gramin banks.

=== Backward Regions Grant Fund ===
The Jalpaiguri district is listed as a backward region and receives financial support from the Backward Regions Grant Fund. The fund, created by the Government of India, is designed to redress regional imbalances in development. As of 2012, 272 districts across the country were listed under this scheme. The list includes 11 districts of West Bengal.

== Transport ==
Mal CD block has 6 ferry services and 7 originating/ terminating bus routes.

NH 31 passes through the block.

== Education ==
In 2013-14, Mal CD block had 156 primary schools with 21,806 students, 16 middle schools with 3,290 students, 8 high schools with 8,351 students and 15 higher secondary schools with 15,882 students. Mal CD block had 1 general degree college with 3,810 students and 865 institutions for special and non-formal education with 40,633 students.

See also – Education in India

According to the 2011 census, in the Mal CD block, among the 100 inhabited villages, 6 villages did not have schools, 50 villages had two or more primary schools, 33 villages had at least 1 primary and 1 middle school and 15 villages had at least 1 middle and 1 secondary school.

== Healthcare ==
In 2014, Mal CD block had 1 block primary health centre, 3 primary health centres and 10 NGO/ private nursing home with total 214 beds and 15 doctors (excluding private bodies). Mal municipal area (located outside the block) had 1 hospital with 100 beds and 15 doctors. It had 51 family welfare subcentres. 6,052 patients were treated indoor and 85,062 patients were treated outdoor in the hospitals, health centres and subcentres of the CD block.

Odlabari Block Primary Health Centre, with 10 beds at Odlabari, PO Panbari, is the major government medical facility in the Mal CD block. There are primary health centres at Chak Moulani (PO Lataguri) (with 6 beds), Uttar Saripukhari (PO Krantihat) (with 4 beds), Dakshin Hanskhali (with 6 beds).

== See also ==
- Kalagaity
