= Puna Bhengra =

Indian politician

Member of the West Bengal Legislative Assembly
- Incumbent
- Assumed office 2 May 2021
- Preceded by: Sukra Munda
- Constituency: Nagrakata

Personal details
- Party: Bharatiya Janata Party
- Education: 10th Pass
- Profession: Politician

Puna Bhengra is an Indian politician from Bharatiya Janata Party. In May 2021, he was elected as a member of the West Bengal Legislative Assembly from Nagrakata (constituency). He defeated Joseph Munda of All India Trinamool Congress by 14,402 votes in 2021 West Bengal Assembly election.
