= Mitali Roy =

Indian politician

Chairperson of Rogi Kalyan Samiti, Dhupguri Block Rural Hospital
- In office 2021 – 1 September 2023

Member of the West Bengal Legislative Assembly
- In office 2016–2021
- Succeeded by: Bishnu Pada Roy
- Constituency: Dhupguri

Personal details
- Party: Bharatiya Janata Party
- Other political affiliations: All India Trinamool Congress
- Occupation: Politician

Mitali Roy is an Indian politician from the state of West Bengal. She is the daughter of Jagadananda Roy who was ex MIC and MLA of Falakata. She is a first term member of the West Bengal Legislative Assembly.

== Constituency ==
Roy represents the Dhupguri (Vidhan Sabha constituency). Roy won the Dhupguri (Vidhan Sabha constituency) on an All India Trinamool Congress ticket. She beat the sitting member of the West Bengal Legislative Assembly, Mamata Roy of the Communist Party of India (Marxist) by over 18000 votes.

== Political Party ==
Roy was from the All India Trinamool Congress. But before few days of bypoll she joined BJP.
