= Naresh Roy =

Indian politician in West Bengal

Member of the West Bengal Legislative Assembly
- Incumbent
- Assumed office 9 May 2026
- Preceded by: Nirmal Chandra Roy
- Constituency: Dhupguri

Personal details
- Party: Bharatiya Janata Party
- Profession: Politician

Naresh Roy is a politician from West Bengal. He is a member of West Bengal Legislative Assembly, from Dhupguri Assembly constituency. He is a member of Bharatiya Janata Party.

== See also ==
- List of chief ministers of West Bengal
- West Bengal Legislative Assembly
