= Patkata, West Bengal =

Village in West Bengal, India

Patkata
- Village
- Location within West Bengal Location within India
- Coordinates: 26°34′15″N 88°40′17″E
- Country: India
- State: West Bengal
- District: Jalpaiguri
- Block: Jalpaiguri

Government
  - Type: Gram Panchayat

Area
  - Total: 71.92 km^{2} (27.77 sq mi)
- Elevation: 89 m (292 ft)

Population (2011)
  - Total: 43,360
  - Density: 602.9/km^{2} (1,561/sq mi)

Languages
  - Official: Bengali
  - Other: Urdu, Nepali, English
- Time zone: UTC+5:30 (IST)
- PIN: 735133
- STD code: 03561
- Vehicle registration: WB-71, WB-72

Patkata is a village in the suburb of Jalpaiguri, Jalpaiguri District, West Bengal, India. It is located near the border with Bangladesh, approximately 4 kilometres northwest of the city center of Jalpaiguri. As of the year 2011, the village has a total population of 43,360.

== Geography ==
Patkata is situated on the western shore of Teesta River. The West Bengal State Highway 12A passes through the south of the village. It covers an area of 7192.4 hectares.

== Healthcare ==
1 Primary Health Sub-Centre, 2 RMP doctors are available in this village.

== Education ==
Government Pre Primary, Private Pre Primary, Govt Primary and Govt Secondary Schools and one technical college are available in this village.

== Demographics ==
According to the 2011 Indian Census, Patkata has 9,717 households. Among the 43,360 inhabitants, 22,203 are male, and 21,157 are female. The total literacy rate is 60.87%, with 15,100 of the male population and 11,294 of the female population being literate.
