= Karala River =

River in West Bengal, India

Karala River is a river in the Jalpaiguri district of West Bengal, India. It is a tributary of the Teesta River.
