= Nirmal Chandra Roy =

Indian politician

Member of the West Bengal Legislative Assembly
- In office 30 September 2023 – 4 May 2026
- Preceded by: Bishnu Pada Roy
- Succeeded by: Naresh Roy
- Constituency: Dhupguri

Personal details
- Party: Trinamool Congress
- Education: University of North Bengal
- Profession: Politician, Professor

Dr. Nirmal Chandra Roy is an Indian politician from Trinamool Congress. In the September 2023 by-election, he was elected as the member of the West Bengal Legislative Assembly from Dhupguri.

== Career ==
Roy is from Dhupguri, Jalpaiguri district, born in 1962 in a Rajbanshi family. His father's name is Gajendra Nath Roy. He passed B.A. from Ananda Chandra College in 1983, M.A. in 1985, and Ph.D. in 2017 from University of North Bengal. Before entering full-time politics, Roy was a Professor of History at Dhupguri Girls' College. In 2021 Jalpaiguri District AITC President Krishna Kumar Kalyani wanted him as the candidate in Dhupguri, but the party refused him. After that Prof. Nirmal wanted to contest as an independent candidate. A few days after that Mr. Kalyani went to his house and told him not to compete. Then Prof. Nirmal withdrew his candidacy. After the death of Bisnupada Roy the sitting MLA of Dhupguri Dr. Nirmal contested 2023 (By-election) West Bengal Legislative Assembly election from Dhupguri Vidhan Sabha and won the seat on 8 September 2023. He subsequently contested the Lok Sabha Election 2024 from Jalpaiguri Lok Sabha constituency. He lost to Jayanta Kumar Roy of BJP by a margin of 86,693.
