= Bishnu Pada Roy =

Indian politician (1962 - 2023)

Bishnu Pada Ray

Member of the West Bengal Legislative Assembly
- In office 2 May 2021 – 25 July 2023
- Preceded by: Mitali Roy
- Succeeded by: Nirmal Chandra Roy
- Constituency: Dhupguri

Personal details
- Born: 1962 West Bengal, India
- Died: 25 July 2023 (aged 60–61) Kolkata, West Bengal, India
- Party: Bharatiya Janata Party
- Occupation: Politician

Bishnu Pada Roy was an Indian politician from the state of West Bengal. He was a member of the West Bengal Legislative Assembly from 2021 to 2023, from the Dhupguri constituency.

He was a first-time MLA elected in 2021, he got elected after defeating the Trinamool Congress candidate and also the sitting MLA Mitali Roy.

== Death ==
Dhupguri Bishnu Pada Ray complained of uneasiness and was admitted in SSKM Hospital, Kolkata where he underwent surgery and his condition improved temporarily. But it again deteriorated at night and he died on 25 July 2023.
