= Joseph Munda =

Indian politician

MLA of Nagrakata Vidhan Sabha Constituency
- In office 2011–2016
- Preceded by: Sukhmoith (Piting) Oraon
- Succeeded by: Sukra Munda

Personal details
- Party: All India Trinamool Congress

Joseph Munda is an Indian politician belonging to the All India Trinamool Congress. He was elected as INC MLA of Nagrakata Vidhan Sabha Constituency in the West Bengal Legislative Assembly in 2011. He was the President of Matiali Block Trinamool Congress till 2024.

State Legislative Assembly
Preceded by Sukhmoith (Piting) Oraon	Member of the West Bengal Legislative Assembly from Nagrakata Assembly constituency 2011–	Succeeded by Sukra Munda
