= Nagrakata (community development block) =

- Community development block
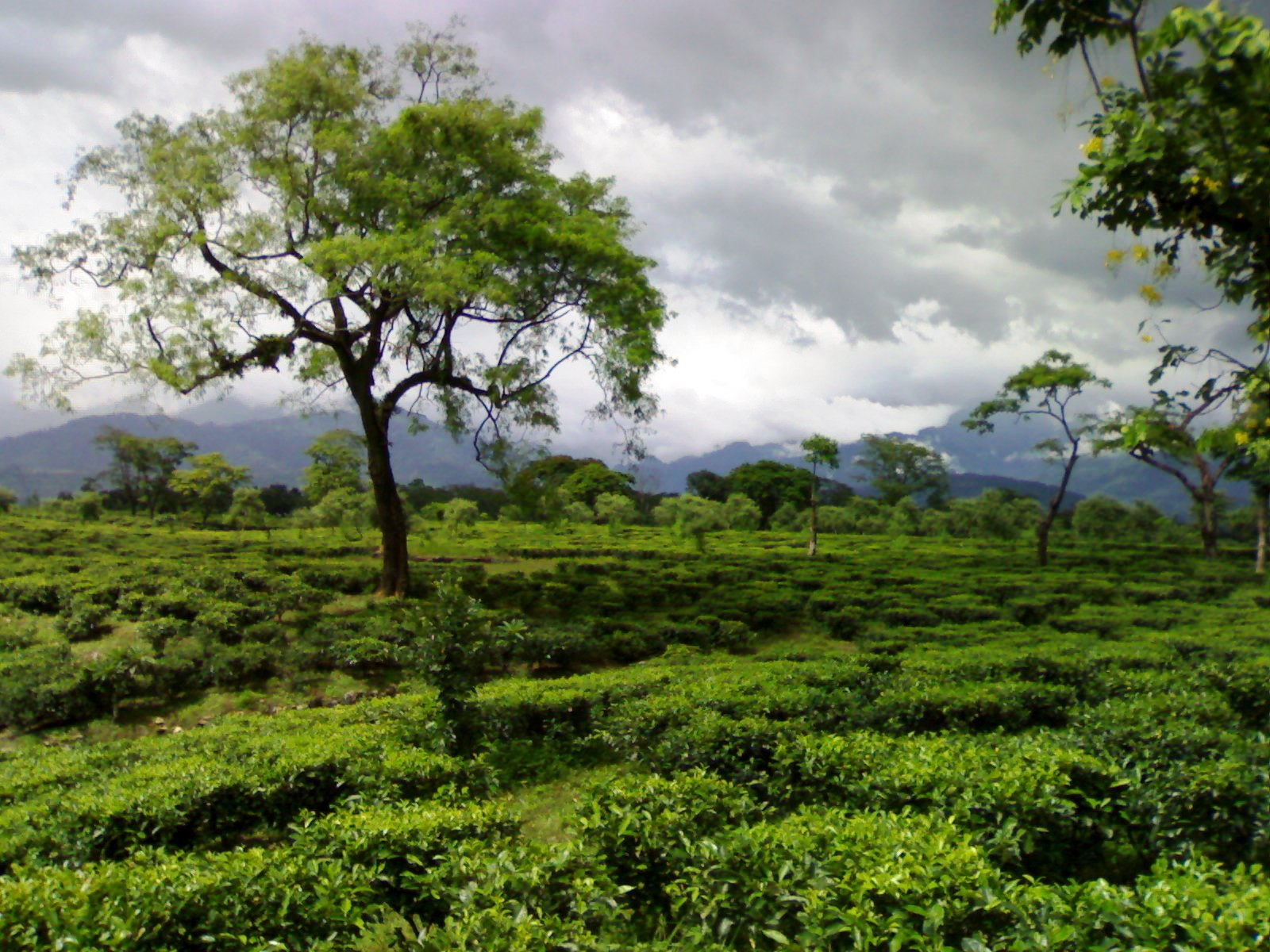
- Hila Tea Garden in Nagrakata CD block

- Coordinates: 26.881°N 88.905°E
- Country: India
- State: West Bengal
- District: Jalpaiguri

Area
  - Total: 397.48 km^{2} (153.47 sq mi)

Population (2011)
  - Total: 127,397
  - Density: 320.51/km^{2} (830.12/sq mi)

Languages
  - Official: Bengali, English
- Time zone: UTC+5:30 (IST)
- Telephone code: 03565
- Sex ratio: 974 ♂/♀
- Lok Sabha constituency: Alipurduars
- Vidhan Sabha constituency: Nagrakata
- Website: jalpaiguri.gov.in

Nagrakata is a community development block (CD block) that forms an administrative division in the Malbazar subdivision of the Jalpaiguri district in the Indian state of West Bengal.The Nagrakata CD block has an area of 397.48 km^{2}. It has 1 panchayat samity, 5 gram panchayats, 91 gram sansads (village councils), 34 mouzas and 33 inhabited villages. Nagrakta police station serves this block. Headquarters of this CD block is at Nagrakata.

== Geography ==
Nagrakata is located at 26°52′52″N 88°54′18″E.

The Nagrakata CD block lies in the north-central part of the district. The Murti River flows along the eastern boundary. The Jaldhaka River and Gatia River flow through the CD block. It has hilly terrain which is part of the sub-Himalayan ranges.

The Nagrakata CD block is bounded by the Samtse District of Bhutan on the north, Banarhat CD block on the east, Maynaguri CD block on the south and Matiali CD block on the west.

The Nagrakata CD block has an area of 397.48 km^{2}. It has 1 panchayat samity, 5 gram panchayats, 91 gram sansads (village councils), 34 mouzas and 33 inhabited villages. Nagrakta police station serves this block. Headquarters of this CD block is at Nagrakata.

Gram panchayats of Nagrakata block/ panchayat samiti are: Angrabhasa I, Angrabhasa II, Champaguri, Luksan and Sulkapara.

== Demographics ==
=== Population ===
According to the 2011 Census of India, the Nagrakata CD block had a total population of 127,397, all of which were rural. There were 64,133 (50%) males and 63,234 (50%) females. There were 16,991 persons in the age range of 0 to 6 years. The Scheduled Castes numbered 17,626 (13.84%) and the Scheduled Tribes numbered 62,624 (49.16%).

According to the 2001 census, Nagrakata block had a total population of 119,556, out of which 60,561 were males and 58,995 were females. Nagrakata block registered a population growth of 17.46 per cent during the 1991-2001 decade.

Large villages (with 4,000+ population) in the Nagrakata CD block are (2011 census figures in brackets): Jiti Tea Garden (5,588), Hope Tea Garden (4,076), Naya Saili Tea Garden (5,446), Nagrakata Tea Garden (4,598), Sukhanibasti (4,100), Bhagatpur Tea Garden (12,555), Kurti Tea Garden (4,285), Gatia Tea Garden (5,855), Luksan Tea Garden (8,027), Chengmari Tea Garden (14,446), Grassmore Tea Garden (5,563), Sulkapara (5,682) and Bamandanga Tea Garden (4,698).

Other villages in the Nagrakata CD block include (2011 census figures in brackets): Nagrakata (356), Hila Tea Garden (2,843), Angrabhasa (3,224).

=== Literacy ===
According to the 2011 census, the total number of literate persons in the Nagrakata CD block was 67,646 (61.27% of the population over 6 years) out of which males numbered 39,138 (70.51% of the male population over 6 years) and females numbered 28,508 (51.93% of the female population over 6 years). The gender disparity (the difference between female and male literacy rates) was 18.58%.

See also – List of West Bengal districts ranked by literacy rate

Literacy in CD blocks of
Jalpaiguri district
Jalpaiguri Sadar subdivision
Rajganj – 62.82%
Jalpaiguri – 73.81%
Maynaguri – 75.63%
Dhupguri – 60.57%
Malbazar subdivision
Mal – 66.31
Matiali – 66.98%
Nagrakata – 61.27%
Alipurduar subdivision
Madarihat-Birpara – 67.77%
Kalchini – 68.96%
Kumargram – 72.42%
Alipurduar I – 78.19%
Alipurduar II – 75.76%
Falakata – 72.64%
2011 Census: CD Block Wise

Primary Census Abstract Data

=== Language and religion ===
Religion in Nagrakata CD block (2011)
Hinduism	79.91%
Islam	7.77%
Christianity	7.37%
Tribal religion	2.60%
Buddhism	2.17%
Other or not stated	0.18%

In the 2011 Census of India, Hindus numbered 101,798 and formed 79.91% of the population of Nagrakata CD block. Muslims numbered 9,901 and formed 7.77% of the population. Christians numbered 9,391 and formed 7.37% of the population. Others numbered 6,307 and formed 4.95% of the population. Others include Addi Bassi, Marang Boro, Santal, Saranath, Sari Dharma, Sarna, Alchchi, Bidin, Sant, Saevdharm, Seran, Saran, Sarin, Kheria, and other religious communities.

Languages of Nagrakata CD block (2011)
1. Sadri (45.1%)
2. Nepali (17.5%)
3. Bengali (15.1%)
4. Kurukh (4.92%)
5. Santali (3.34%)
6. Hindi (2.84%)
7. Rajbongshi (2.63%)
8. Bhojpuri (2.12%)
9. Others (6.48%)

At the time of the 2011 census, 45.07% of the population spoke Sadri, 17.50% Nepali, 15.10% Bengali, 4.92% Kurukh, 3.34% Santali, 2.84% Hindi, 2.63% Rajbongshi and 2.12% Bhojpuri as their first language.

== Poverty level ==
Based on a study of the per capita consumption in rural and urban areas, using central sample data of NSS 55th Round 1999-2000, Jalpaiguri district was found to have relatively high rates of poverty of 35.73% in rural areas and 61.53% in the urban areas. It was one of the few districts where urban poverty rate was higher than the rural poverty rate.

According to a World Bank report, as of 2012, 26-31% of the population of Jalpaiguri, Bankura and Paschim Medinipur districts were below poverty line, a relatively high level of poverty in West Bengal, which had an average 20% of the population below poverty line.

== Economy ==
=== Livelihood ===
Livelihood
in Nagrakata CD block
1. Cultivators (8.50%)
2. Agricultural labourers (14.0%)
3. Household industries (1.68%)
4. Other Workers (75.8%)

In the Nagrakata CD block in 2011, among the class of total workers, cultivators numbered 4,130 and formed 8.50%, agricultural labourers numbered 6,796 and formed 13.99%, household industry workers numbered 815 and formed 1.68% and other workers numbered 36,824 and formed 75.82%. Total workers numbered 48,565 and formed 38.12% of the total population, and non-workers numbered 78,832 and formed 61.88% of the population.

Note: In the census records a person is considered a cultivator, if the person is engaged in cultivation/ supervision of land owned by self/government/institution. When a person who works on another person's land for wages in cash or kind or share, is regarded as an agricultural labourer. Household industry is defined as an industry conducted by one or more members of the family within the household or village, and one that does not qualify for registration as a factory under the Factories Act. Other workers are persons engaged in some economic activity other than cultivators, agricultural labourers and household workers. It includes factory, mining, plantation, transport and office workers, those engaged in business and commerce, teachers, entertainment artistes and so on.

=== Infrastructure ===
There are 33 inhabited villages in the Nagrakata CD block, as per the District Census Handbook, Jalpaiguri, 2011. 100% villages have power supply. 32 villages (96.97%) have drinking water supply. 10 villages (30.30%) have post offices. 24 villages (72.73%) have telephones (including landlines, public call offices and mobile phones). 22 villages (66.67%) have pucca (paved) approach roads and 12 villages (36.36%) have transport communication (includes bus service, rail facility and navigable waterways). 3 villages (9.09%) have banks.

=== Agriculture ===
The economy of the Jalpaiguri district is mainly dependent on agriculture and plantations, and majority of the people are engaged in agriculture. Jalpaiguri is well-known for tea and timber. Other important crops are paddy, jute, tobacco, mustard seeds, sugarcane and wheat. The annual average rainfall is 3,440 mm, around double of that of Kolkata and the surrounding areas. The area is flood prone and the rivers often change course causing immense damage to crops and cultivated lands.

In 2013-14, there were 11 fertiliser depots, 3 seed stores and 30 fair price shops in the Nagrakata CD block.

In 2013–14, the Nagrakata CD block produced 5,618 tonnes of Aman paddy, the main winter crop, from 2,912 hectares, 112 tonnes of Boro paddy (spring crop) from 75 hectares, 748 tonnes of Aus paddy (summer crop) from 380 hectares, 391 tonnes of wheat from 146 hectares, 893 tonnes of maize from 557 hectares, 2,616 tonnes of jute from 170 hectares and 9,196 tonnes of potatoes from 396 hectares. It also produced pulses and oilseeds.

In 2013-14, the total area irrigated in the Nagrakata CD block was 1,851 hectares, out of which 1,595 hectares were irrigated by canal water, 21 hectares by tank water, 200 hectares by river lift irrigation and 35 hectares by shallow tube wells.

=== Dooars-Terai tea gardens ===
Tea gardens in the Dooars and Terai regions produce 226 million kg or over a quarter of India's total tea crop.. The Dooars-Terai tea is characterized by a bright, smooth and full-bodied liquor that's a wee bit lighter than Assam tea. Cultivation of tea in the Dooars was primarily pioneered and promoted by the British but there was significant contribution of Indian entrepreneurs.

=== Banking ===
In 2013-14, Nagrakata CD block had offices of 4 commercial banks and 1 gramin bank.

=== Backward Regions Grant Fund ===
The Jalpaiguri district is listed as a backward region and receives financial support from the Backward Regions Grant Fund. The fund, created by the Government of India, is designed to redress regional imbalances in development. As of 2012, 272 districts across the country were listed under this scheme. The list includes 11 districts of West Bengal.

== Transport ==
Nagrakata CD block has 6 originating/ terminating bus routes.

NH 31C passes through the block.

== Education ==
In 2013-14, Nagrakata CD block had 56 primary schools with 10,090 students, 5 middle schools with 475 students, 1 high school with 1,176 students and 7 higher secondary schools with 7,007 students. Nagrakata CD block had 426 institutions for special and non-formal education with 19,572 students.

See also – Education in India

According to the 2011 census, in the Nagrakata CD block, among the 33 inhabited villages, 2 villages did not schools, 24 villages had two or more primary schools, 12 villages had at least 1 primary and 1 middle school and 7 villages had at least 1 middle and 1 secondary school.

== Healthcare ==
In 2014, Nagrakata CD block had 1 rural hospital, 2 primary health centres and 6 NGO/ private nursing home with total 140 beds and 12 doctors (excluding private bodies). It had 22 family welfare subcentres. 5,906 patients were treated indoor and 143,195 patients were treated outdoor in the hospitals, health centres and subcentres of the CD block.

Sulkapara Rural Hospital, with 30 beds at Sulkapara, is the major government medical facility in the Nagrakata CD block. There are primary health centres at Lookshan (with 4 beds), Dhumpara (PO Nathna) (with 10 beds).
