= Gairkata =

- Census Town
- Location in West Bengal, India Gairkata (India)
- Coordinates: 26.68°N 89.03°E
- Country: India
- State: West Bengal
- District: Jalpaiguri

Population (2011)
  - Total: 7,577

Languages
  - Official: Bengali, English
- Time zone: UTC+5:30 (IST)
- ISO 3166 code: IN-WB
- Vehicle registration: WB
- Lok Sabha constituency: Alipurduars (ST)
- Vidhan Sabha constituency: Madarihat
- Website: jalpaiguri.gov.in

Gairkata is a census town in the Dhupguri subdivision of the Jalpaiguri district in the state of West Bengal, India. It is the native town of prominent Bengali writer Samaresh Majumdar, poet and journalist Bikash Sarkar and CPI leader Samar Ganguly. Gairkata, home to Gosaihat Eco-Park (located in the Gairkata-Moraghat Range), features Telipara as its main industrial hub. An NGO named Aaranyak was also located in Gairkata.

== Geography ==
Places and tea estates in Jalpaiguri Sadar subdivision (including Rajganj, Jalpaiguri, Maynaguri and Dhupguri CD blocks) in Jalpaiguri district
CT: census town, R: rural/ urban centre, N: neighbourhood, C: cantonment, NP: national park/ wildlife sanctuary, TE: tea estate
Abbreviations used in names – TG for Tea Garden (town/village), TE for Tea Estate, JRS: junction railway station
Owing to space constraints in the small map, the actual locations in a larger map may vary slightly

=== Location ===
Gairkata is located at 26.68°N 89.03°E.; on the route of Asian Highway 48 and the major junction from Phuentsholing to Changrabandha. Gairkata is located in the middle of the Dhupguri block.

=== Area overview ===
The map alongside shows the alluvial floodplains south of the outer foothills of the Himalayas. The area is mostly flat, except for low hills in the northern portions. It is a primarily rural area with 62.01% of the population living in rural areas and a moderate 37.99% living in the urban areas. Tea gardens in the Dooars and Terai regions produce 226 million kg or over a quarter of India's total tea crop. Some tea gardens were identified in the 2011 census as census towns or villages. Such places are marked in the map as CT (census town) or R (rural/ urban centre). Specific tea estate pages are marked TE.

Note: The map alongside presents some of the notable locations in the subdivision. All places marked in the map are linked in the larger full screen map.

== Demographics ==
According to the 2011 Census of India, Gairkata had a total population of 7,577 of which 3,827 (51%) were males and 3,750 (49%) were females. There were 749 persons in the age range of 0 to 6 years. The total number of literate people in Gairkata was 5,506 (80.64% of the population over 6 years).

Gairkata census town has total administration over 1,749 houses, to which it supplies basic amenities such as water and sewerage. It is also authorized to build roads within Census Town limits and impose taxes on properties under its jurisdiction. Caste Factor Gairkata (CT) of Jalpaiguri has a substantial population of Schedule Caste. Schedule Caste (SC) constitutes 31.38% while Schedule Tribe (ST) were 17.08% of total population in Gairkata (CT).

In the 2001 India census, Gairkata had a total population of 8713. At that time, males constituted approximately 51% of the population, whereas females consisted of 49% of the overall population.

== Infrastructure ==
According to the District Census Handbook 2011, Jalpaiguri, Gairkata covered an area of 2.96 km^{2}. Among the civic amenities, it had 17 km roads with open drains, the protected water supply involved overhead tanks, uncovered wells. It had 1,200 domestic electric connections, 60 road lighting points. Among the medical facilities it had 5 dispensaries/ health centres, 1 veterinary hospital. Among the educational facilities it had 6 primary schools, 2 middle schools, 2 secondary schools, 2 senior secondary schools, the nearest general degree college at Dhupguri 14 km away. It had 1 recognised shorthand, typewriting and vocational training institution, 2 non-formal education centres (Sarva Shiksha Abhiyan). Among the social, recreational and cultural facilities it had 1 working women’s hostel. It had branch of 1 nationalised bank.

== Education ==
Banarhat Kartik Oraon Hindi Government College was established at Banarhat in 2014. Affiliated with the University of North Bengal, it is a Hindi-medium institution offering courses in arts and science.
