= Dhupguri Assembly constituency =

Dhupguri
- Constituency No. 15 for the West Bengal Legislative Assembly
- Interactive Map Outlining Dhupguri (SC) Assembly Constituency

Constituency details
- Country: India
- Region: East India
- State: West Bengal
- District: Jalpaiguri
- Lok Sabha constituency: Jalpaiguri (SC)
- Established: 1951
- Total electors: 258,677
- Reservation: SC

Member of Legislative Assembly
- 18th West Bengal Legislative Assembly
- Incumbent Naresh Roy
- Party: Bharatiya Janata Party
- Elected year: 2026
- Preceded by: Nirmal Chandra Roy

Most Successful parties from Dhupguri (SC) assembly
1. Communist Party of India (Marxist) (8 times) (47.1%)
2. Indian National Congress (3 times) (17.7%)
3. Samyukta Socialist Party (2 times) (11.8%)
4. All India Trinamool Congress (2 times) (11.8%)
5. Bharatiya Janata Party (2 times) (11.8%)

Dhupguri Assembly constituency is an assembly constituency in Jalpaiguri district in the Indian state of West Bengal. It is reserved for scheduled castes.

== Overview ==
As per orders of the Delimitation Commission, No. 15 Dhupguri Assembly constituency (SC) covers Dhupguri municipality, Banarhat I, Salbari I, Salbari II gram panchayats of Banarhat community development block and Barogharia, Gadhearkuthi, Gadong-I, Gadong II, Jharaltagram I, Jharaltagram II, Magurmari I, Magurmari II, Sakoyajhora II, gram panchayats of Dhupguri community development block,

Dhupguri Assembly constituency is part of No. 3 Jalpaiguri (Lok Sabha constituency) (SC).

== Members of the Legislative Assembly ==
Election	Member	Party Affiliation
1951	Rabindranath Sikdar	Indian National Congress
1957	Constituency Doesn't Exist	
1962	Constituency Doesn't Exist	
1967	Anil Guha Neogi	Samyukta Socialist Party
1969	Anil Guha Neogi	Samyukta Socialist Party
1971	Bhawani Paul	Indian National Congress
1972	Bhawani Paul	Indian National Congress
1977	Banamali Roy	Communist Party of India (Marxist)
1982	Banamali Roy	Communist Party of India (Marxist)
1987	Banamali Roy	Communist Party of India (Marxist)
1991	Banamali Roy	Communist Party of India (Marxist)
1996	Banamali Roy	Communist Party of India (Marxist)
2001	Lakshmi Kanta Roy	Communist Party of India (Marxist)
2006	Lakshmi Kanta Roy	Communist Party of India (Marxist)
2011	Mamata Roy	Communist Party of India (Marxist)
2016	Mitali Roy	All India Trinamool Congress
2021	Bishnu Pada Roy	Bharatiya Janata Party
2023 - By Election	Nirmal Chandra Roy	All India Trinamool Congress
2026	Naresh Roy	Bharatiya Janata Party

== Election results ==
=== 2026 ===
2026 West Bengal Legislative Assembly election: Dhupguri (SC)
Party	Candidate	Votes	%	±%
BJP	Naresh Roy	134,798	54.25	▲10.02
AITC	Nirmal Chandra Roy	96,248	38.73	▼7.55
CPI(M)	Niranjan Roy	7,625	3.07	▼3.45
IND	Tapas Chandra Sarkar	1,548	0.62	New entry
IND	Hrishikesh Adhikari	1,492	0.60	New entry
INC	Harish Chandra Roy	1,467	0.59	New entry
NOTA	None of the above	1,159	0.47	▼0.11
Majority		38,550	15.52	▲13.47
Turnout		248,496	96.06	▲17.77
Registered electors		258,677		▼3.99
BJP gain from AITC		Swing	8.78	

=== 2023 ===
Dhupguri (SC) constituency
Party	Candidate	Votes	%	±%
AITC	Nirmal Chandra Roy	97,613	46.28	▲2.53
BJP	Tapasi Roy	93,304	44.23	▼1.42
CPI(M)	Iswar Chandra Roy	13,758	6.52	▲0.79
NOTA	None of the Above	1,220	0.58	
Majority		4,309	2.04	▲0.14
Turnout		211,084	78.35	
AITC gain from BJP		Swing		

=== 2021 ===
2021 West Bengal Legislative Assembly election: Dhupguri (SC) constituency
Party	Candidate	Votes	%	±%
BJP	Bishnu Pada Roy	104,688	45.65	
AITC	Mitali Roy	100,333	43.75	
CPI(M)	Dr. Pradip Kumar Roy	13,107	5.72	
BSP	Bedodyuti Roy	2,178	0.95	
Independent	Hrishikesh Roy	2,169	0.95	
Kamatapur People’s Party	Sukumar Roy	2,155	0.94	
NOTA	None of the above	1,984	0.87	
Majority		4,355	1.9	
Turnout		229,323	87.16	
BJP gain from AITC		Swing		

=== 2016 ===
2016 West Bengal Legislative Assembly election: Dhupguri (SC) constituency
Party	Candidate	Votes	%	±%
AITC	Mitali Roy	90,781	43.49	▲3.67
CPI(M)	Mamata Roy	71,517	34.26	▼7.99
BJP	Agun Roy	36,167	17.33	▲6.68
Majority		19,264	9.22	▲6.79
Turnout		208,947		
AITC gain from CPI(M)		Swing		

=== 2011 ===
In the 2011 election, Mamata Ray of CPI(M) defeated her nearest rival Mina Barman of Trinamool Congress.

West Bengal assembly elections, 2011: Dhupguri (SC) constituency
Party	Candidate	Votes	%	±%
CPI(M)	Mamata Roy	73,644	42.25	▼7.04
AITC	Mina Barman	69,406	39.82	▼0.23#
BJP	Amar Chand Sarkar	18,559	10.65	
Independent	Mitali Roy	7,021	4.03	
BSP	Rai Charan Siddhya	3,578	2.05	
Samajwadi Jan Parishad	Subhas Chandra Roy	2,077	1.19	
Majority		4,238	2.43	
Turnout		174,285	87.12	
CPI(M) hold		Swing		

.# Swing calculated on Congress+Trinamool Congress vote percentages taken together in 2006.

=== 2006 ===
In 2006 and 2001 state assembly elections, Lakshmi Kanta Roy of CPI(M) won the 15 Dhupguri (SC) seat defeating his nearest rival Ashok Kumar Barman of Trinamool Congress. Contests in most years were multi cornered but only winners and runners are being mentioned. Banamali Roy of CPI(M) defeated Nripendra Nath Roy of Congress in 1996, Birendra Nath Barman of Congress in 1991, Nripendra Nath Roy of Congress in 1987, and Jagadamba Roy of Congress in 1982 and 1977.

=== 1972 ===
Bhawani Paul of Congress won in 1972 and 1971. Anil Guha Neogi of SSP won in 1969 and 1967. Dhupguri constituency did not exist 1962 and 1957. In independent India's first election in 1951 Rabindra Nath Sikdar of Congress won from Dhupguri.
