= Nagrakata Assembly constituency =

Nagrakata (ST)
- Constituency No. 21 for the West Bengal Legislative Assembly
- Interactive Map Outlining Nagrakata (ST) Assembly Constituency

Constituency details
- Country: India
- Region: East India
- State: West Bengal
- District: Jalpaiguri
- Lok Sabha constituency: Alipurduars (ST)
- Established: 1962
- Total electors: 220,932
- Reservation: ST

Member of Legislative Assembly
- 18th West Bengal Legislative Assembly
- Incumbent Puna Bhengra
- Party: Bharatiya Janata Party
- Elected year: 2026

Most Successful parties from Nagrakata (ST) assembly
1. Communist Party of India (Marxist) (8 times) (50.0%)
2. Indian National Congress (4 times) (25.0%)
3. Bharatiya Janata Party (2 times) (12.5%)
4. Communist Party of India (1 time) (6.25%)
5. All India Trinamool Congress (1 time) (6.25%)

Nagrakata (ST) Assembly constituency is an assembly constituency in Jalpaiguri district in the Indian state of West Bengal. It is reserved for scheduled tribes.

== Overview ==
As per orders of the Delimitation Commission, No. 21 Nagrakata Assembly constituency (ST) comprises the Nagrakat and Matiali community development blocks, along with the Banarhat II and Chamurchi gram panchayats of Dhupguri community development block.

The Nagrakata Assembly constituency falls under the No. 2 Alipurduars (Lok Sabha constituency) (ST).

== Members of the Legislative Assembly ==
Year	Name	Party
1962	Budhu Bhagat	Indian National Congress
1967	Budhu Bhagat	Indian National Congress
1969	Bhudhu Bhagat	Indian National Congress
1971	Punai Oraon	Communist Party of India
1972	Prem Oraon	Communist Party of India
1977	Punai Oraon	Communist Party of India
1982	Punai Oraon	Communist Party of India
1987	Chaitan Munda	Communist Party of India
1991	Chaitan Munda	Communist Party of India
1996	Chaitan Munda	Communist Party of India
2001	Chaitan Munda	Communist Party of India
2006	Sukhmoith (Piting) Oraon	Communist Party of India
2011	Joseph Munda	Indian National Congress
2016	Sukra Munda	All India Trinamool Congress
2021	Puna Bhengra	Bharatiya Janata Party
2026	Puna Bhengra	Bharatiya Janata Party

== Election results ==
=== 2026 ===
In the 2026 West Bengal Legislative Assembly election, Puna Bhengra of BJP defeated his nearest rival Sanjay Kujur of TMC by 25,858 votes.

2026 West Bengal Legislative Assembly election: Nagrakata (ST)
Party	Candidate	Votes	%	±%
BJP	Puna Bhengra	103,478	50.73	▲1.18
AITC	Sanjay Kujur	77,620	38.06	▲0.79
CPI(M)	Dil Kumar Oraon	9,708	4.76	New entry
INC	Sinu Munda	4,567	2.24	▼4.27
IND	Hemant Kujur	2,177	1.07	New entry
AJUP	Sibdas Baskey	2,142	1.05	New entry
GSP	Pingal Minj	763	0.37	New entry
SUCI(C)	Kaharu Oraon	621	0.3	New entry
NOTA	Nota	2,887	1.42	▼1.43
Majority		25,858	12.67	▲0.39
Turnout		203,963	92.32	▲11.76
Registered electors		220,932		▼6.9
BJP hold		Swing	0.19	

=== 2021 ===
In the 2021 West Bengal Legislative Assembly election, Puna Bhengra of BJP defeated his nearest rival Joseph Munda of TMC.

2021 West Bengal Legislative Assembly election: Nagrakata
Party	Candidate	Votes	%	±%
BJP	Puna Bhengra	94,722	49.55	
AITC	Joseph Munda	71,247	37.27	
INC	Sukbir Subba	12,442	6.51	
Independent	Robat Munda	3,283	1.72	
Progressive People's Party	Benam Oraon	2,247	1.18	
Independent	Ashan Tirkey	1,774	0.93	
NOTA	None of the above	5,454	2.85	
Majority		23,475	12.28	
Turnout		191,169	80.56	
BJP gain from AITC		Swing		

=== 2016 ===
In the 2016 West Bengal Legislative Assembly election, Sukra Munda of TMC defeated his nearest rival Joseph Munda of Congress.

2016 West Bengal Legislative Assembly election: Nagrakata (ST) constituency
Party	Candidate	Votes	%	±%
AITC	Sukra Munda	57,306	32.46	
INC	Joseph Munda	54,078	30.63	
BJP	John Barla	47,836	27.10	
ABGL	Ganesh Lama	3,855	2.18	
Independent	Indar Deo Oraon	3,829	2.17	
Independent	Pawan Kumar Kherwar	3,442	1.95	
None of the Above (India)	None of the Above	6,196	3.51	
Majority		3,228	1.83	
Turnout		1,76,542	82.55	
AITC gain from INC		Swing		

=== 2011 ===
In the 2011 West Bengal Legislative Assembly election, Joseph Munda of Congress defeated his nearest rival Sukhmoith Oraon of CPI(M).

2011 West Bengal Legislative Assembly election: Nagrakata (ST) constituency
Party	Candidate	Votes	%	±%
INC	Joseph Munda	46,537	30.27	
CPI(M)	Sukhmoith (Piting) Oraon	43,774	29.77	
JMM	William Minj	40,664	26.45	
Independent	Rajesh Lakra	20,778	13.51	
Majority		763	0.50	
Turnout		1,53,753	83.72	
INC gain from CPI(M)		Swing		

=== 2006 ===
In the 2006 state assembly elections, Sukhmoith (Piting) Oraon of CPI(M) won the 21 Nagrakata (ST) seat defeating his nearest rival Shankar Barik of Congress. Contests in most years were multi cornered but only winners and runners are being mentioned. Chaitan Munda of CPI(M) defeated Ganesh Oraon of Trinamool Congress in 2001, Victor Lakra of Congress in 1996 and Bhadeya Oraon of Congress in 1991. Sukra Oraon of CPI(M) defeated Bhadea Oraon of Congress in 1987. Punai Oraon of CPI(M) defeated Tuna Oraon of Congress in 1982 and Hemraj Bhagat of Congress in 1977.

=== 1972 ===
Prem Oraon of CPI won in 1972. Punai Oraon of CPI(M) won in 1971. Budhu Bhagat of Congress won in 1969, 1967 and 1962. In 1957 Mangru Bhagat of CPI and Budhu Bhagat of Congress won the Mal (ST) joint seat.
