= Dhupguri =

- City
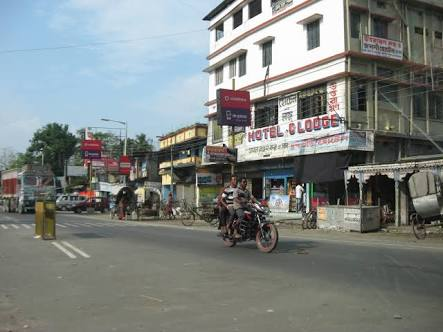
- A public road in Dhupguri, March 2018

- Location in West Bengal, India Dhupguri (India)
- Coordinates: 26°35′20″N 89°00′25″E
- Country: India
- State: West Bengal
- District: Jalpaiguri

Government
  - Type: Municipality
  - Body: Dhupguri Municipality

Area
  - Total: 14.9 km^{2} (5.8 sq mi)
- Elevation: 80 m (260 ft)

Population (2011)
  - Total: 44,719
  - Density: 3,000/km^{2} (7,770/sq mi)

Languages
  - Official: Bengali, English,
- Time zone: UTC+5:30 (IST)
- Pin/Zip Code: 735210
- Area/STD Code: 03563
- Lok Sabha constituency: Jalpaiguri (SC)
- Vidhan Sabha constituency: Dhupguri (SC), Madarihat (ST), Nagrakata (ST)
- Website: www.dhupgurimunicipality.org.in

Dhupguri is a subdivision and a municipality of Jalpaiguri district near Jaldhaka River in the state of West Bengal, India. It is the headquarters of the Dhupguri subdivision.

== Geography ==
Places and tea estates in Jalpaiguri Sadar subdivision (including Rajganj, Jalpaiguri, Maynaguri and Dhupguri CD blocks) in Jalpaiguri district
CT: census town, R: rural/ urban centre, N: neighbourhood, C: cantonment, NP: national park/ wildlife sanctuary, TE: tea estate
Abbreviations used in names – TG for Tea Garden (town/village), TE for Tea Estate, JRS: junction railway station
Owing to space constraints in the small map, the actual locations in a larger map may vary slightly

=== General ===
Dhupguri has an average elevation of 80 metres (262 feet), and is a municipality in the Jalpaiguri district. In the foothills of the Bhutanese Himalayas, the Jaldhaka River flows through the west of the town. The Daina, Gilandi, Duduya, Kumlai, Jhumur, and Bamni are other rivers which flow through the town.

=== Area overview ===
The map alongside shows the alluvial floodplains south of the outer foothills of the Himalayas. The area is mostly flat, except for low hills in the Northern portions. It is a primarily rural area with 62.01% of the population living in rural areas and a moderate 37.99% living in the urban areas. Tea gardens in the Dooars and Terai regions annually produce 226 million kg or over a quarter of India's total tea crop. Some tea gardens were identified in the 2011 census as census towns or villages. Such places are marked in the map as CT (census town) or R (rural/ urban centre). Specific tea estate pages are marked TE.

Note: The map alongside presents some of the notable locations in the subdivision. All places marked in the map are linked in the larger full screen map.

== Civic administration ==
=== Police station ===
Dhupguri police has jurisdiction over a part of Dhupguri CD block.

=== CD block HQ ===
Headquarters of Dhupguri CD block is at Dhupguri.

== Demographics ==
In the 2011 Indian census, Dhupguri had a population of 44,719: 22,953 men (51 percent) and 21,766 women (49 percent). Dhupguri has a literacy rate of 78 percent, higher than the national average of 74.04 percent; male literacy is 81.61 percent and female literacy 74.21 percent. In Dhupguri, 9.64 percent of the population is under age six. The municipality was established in 2001.

A Rajbongshi community surrounds Dhupguri; Rajbongshi means "royal community". They have a rich cultural heritage and language. The Koch Rajbongshi people called themselves "Kamateshwars" (rulers of Kamata), but their influence and expansion were so extensive that their kingdom is sometimes called the Koch Kingdom. Bhawaiya song is a popular musical form in North Bengal, particularly in the Cooch Behar and Jalpaiguri districts. The Bengali spoken in this city and scrounging region differs from standard Bengali. With the most notable feature being the ছ (voiceless aspirated palatal/postalveolar affricate { t͡ɕʰ }) at the end of many words gets replaced with the - ss sound. But it remains unchanged when the word starts with it.( unlike East Bengal where the shift is universal)

=== Languages ===
Languages spoken in Dhupguri Town (2011)
1. Bengali 94.9 (92.1%)
2. Rajbongshi 3 (2.91%)
3. Hindi 2.3 (2.23%)
4. Napali 1.78 (1.73%)
5. Others 1.05 (1.02%)

== Economy ==
Agriculture is the backbone of the economy. Paddy, potato, jute, choyote, betel nuts, and vegetables are produced in large quantities in and around Dhupguri. It is known for its potatoes, which are exported to Bihar, Assam, and the states of northeastern India. International trade has increased, and potatoes from Dhupguri are available in the markets of Bangladesh, Nepal, and Bhutan. The government-regulated wholesale market has aided local farmers. The regulated market, locally known as Dhupguri Hut, was established for wholesaling agricultural products and is West Bengal's second-largest market. In addition to agriculture, small-scale industries are also growing.

== Transport ==
Dhupguri is connected by rail and roads, such as National Highway 17 (now converted to an Asian Highway from Jaigon on the Indian-Bhutanese border), which runs across the middle of the city. State highways connecting Siliguri-Jalpaiguri and Guwahati also pass Dhupguri.

The Dhupguri railway station (DQG) provides connections to all parts of the country through passenger-train service. Many long-distance trains (including express trains) like (Kanchenjunga Express, Uttarbanga Express, Saraighat Express etc.) pass through Dhupguri daily and provide links to other parts of India. The town is also connected by road to much of West Bengal.

== Education ==
Dhupguri's college (co-ed) Sukanta Mahavidyalaya, was founded in 1981 with departments of English, Bengali, history, economics, philosophy, chemistry, physics, mathematics and political science; physical education, geography, and Sanskrit were later added. The college, affiliated with the University of North Bengal, has a science stream combining physics, mathematics, and computer science. It offers BBA and BCA degrees. Dhupguri Girl's College (affiliated to North Bengal University) It offers undergraduate courses in arts. Dhupguri Girl's College, established in 2013, is the women's general degree college in Dhupguri. Other schools are:

- Dhupguri High School, the town's oldest, opened in 1945. It offers a 10+2 programme in science, arts, commerce, and agriculture. About 2,500 students are enrolled and the faculty numbers about 45.
- Purba Mallickpara High School
- Bairatiguri Higher Secondary School. This school was established in 1949. This is one of the oldest schools in the town.It offers programmes in science, arts, and vocational (co-ed school).
- Dhupguri Girls Higher Secondary School
- Vidhasram Divyajyoti Vidhaniketan High School
- Kalirhat D. C. High School
- Daukimari D. N. High School
- Mallik Para Higher Secondary School
- Dakshin Khayer Bari High School
- Bhor Academy (affiliated with the CBSE)
- Patkidaha Vidyasagar Shishu Niketan
- Mount Carmel School (affiliated to CISCE, New Delhi)
- Salbari High School
- Vivekananda Bidyaniketan
- Juraani High School
- Himalayan Public School

== Popular cultures ==
- Tarun Natya Sangstha is the oldest cultural institution from the town.
- Swapna was the first ever Bengali musical band from the town. At present Doshomik bangla band is carrying their tradition to compose individual music. They were the pioneer of making theme songs for various schools and clubs of the town.

== Points of interest ==
- A vidyaashram (a self-sufficient village following the ideals of Mahatma Gandhi) has been founded near Dhupguri by Dhirendra Nath Dasgupta.
- A library and several clubs sponsor plays on social and cultural issues and seasonal festivals.
- Mayer Sthan is Dhupguri's oldest temple.
- Gorumara National Park and Jaldapara National Park are near Dhupguri.
- The most popular festival of the town is KaliPuja, it is celebrated on the occasion of diwali. Local clubs take up the duty decorate the streets with lights and construct their own marvelous pandals, clubs like STS Club, Shanti Sangha, Netajipara Cultural Club, Suhrid Sangha, Bidhan Sangha, Evergreen Club, Young Association and Bairatiguri Sarbojonin are the notable ones.
- The biggest Bengali festival of Durga Puja is also celebrated with great enthusiasm across the town.
- The town also has a very rich history in the sporting department, STS Club, Nabajiban Sangha, Dhupguri Football CLub, Dooars Cricket Academy are doing their best to carry forward the sporting legacy of Dhupguri.
- Once The biggest cable TV farm in allover North Bengal was in Dhupguri. The oldest cable company "Madona Dish Center"(M.D.C) were known for their local channel too.

== Healthcare ==
Dhupguri Rural Hospital, with more than 100 beds at Dhupguri, is the major government medical facility for the Dhupguri CD block. one nursing home.
