= Jalpaiguri district =

District in West Bengal, India

- District of West Bengal
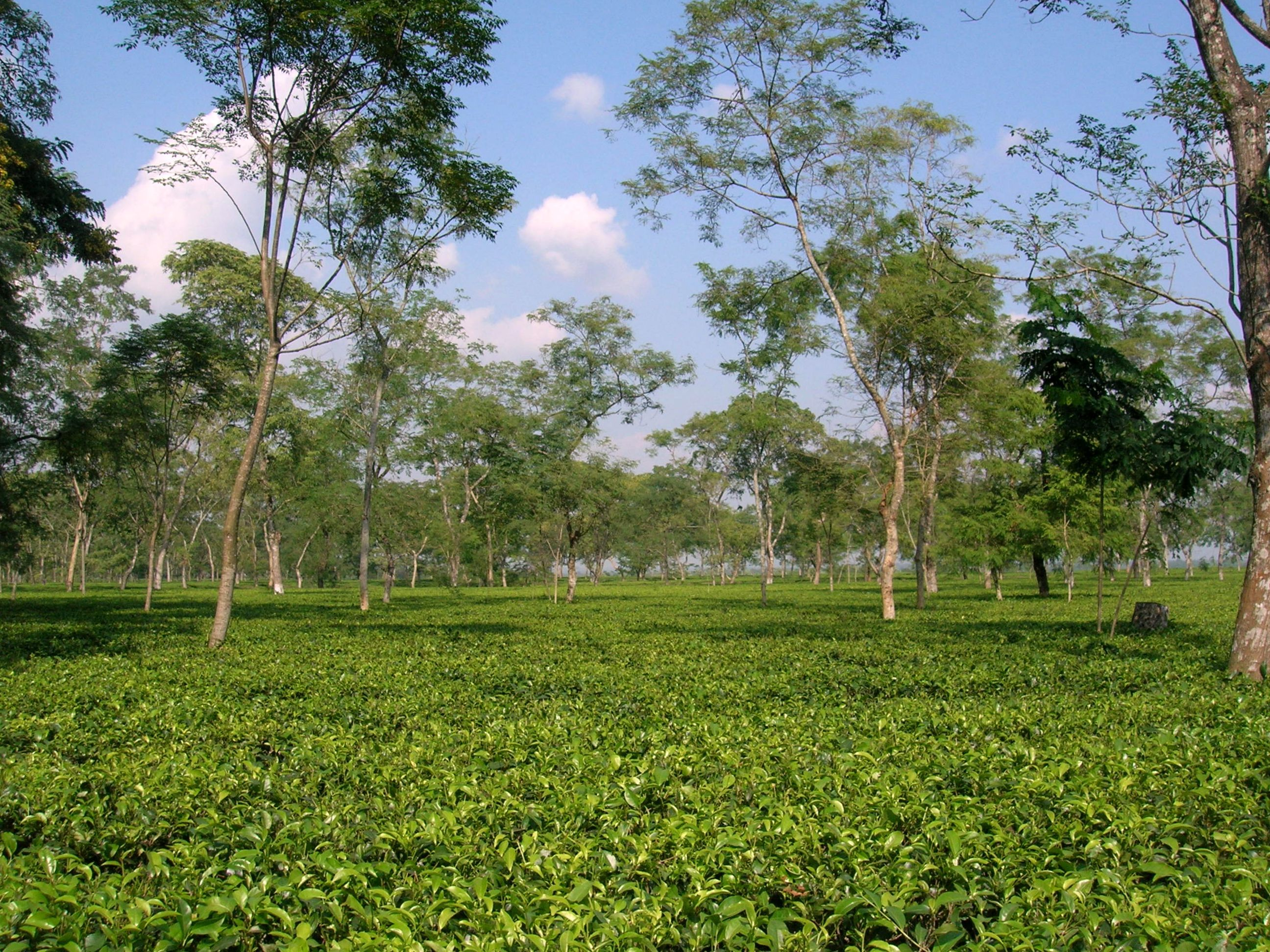
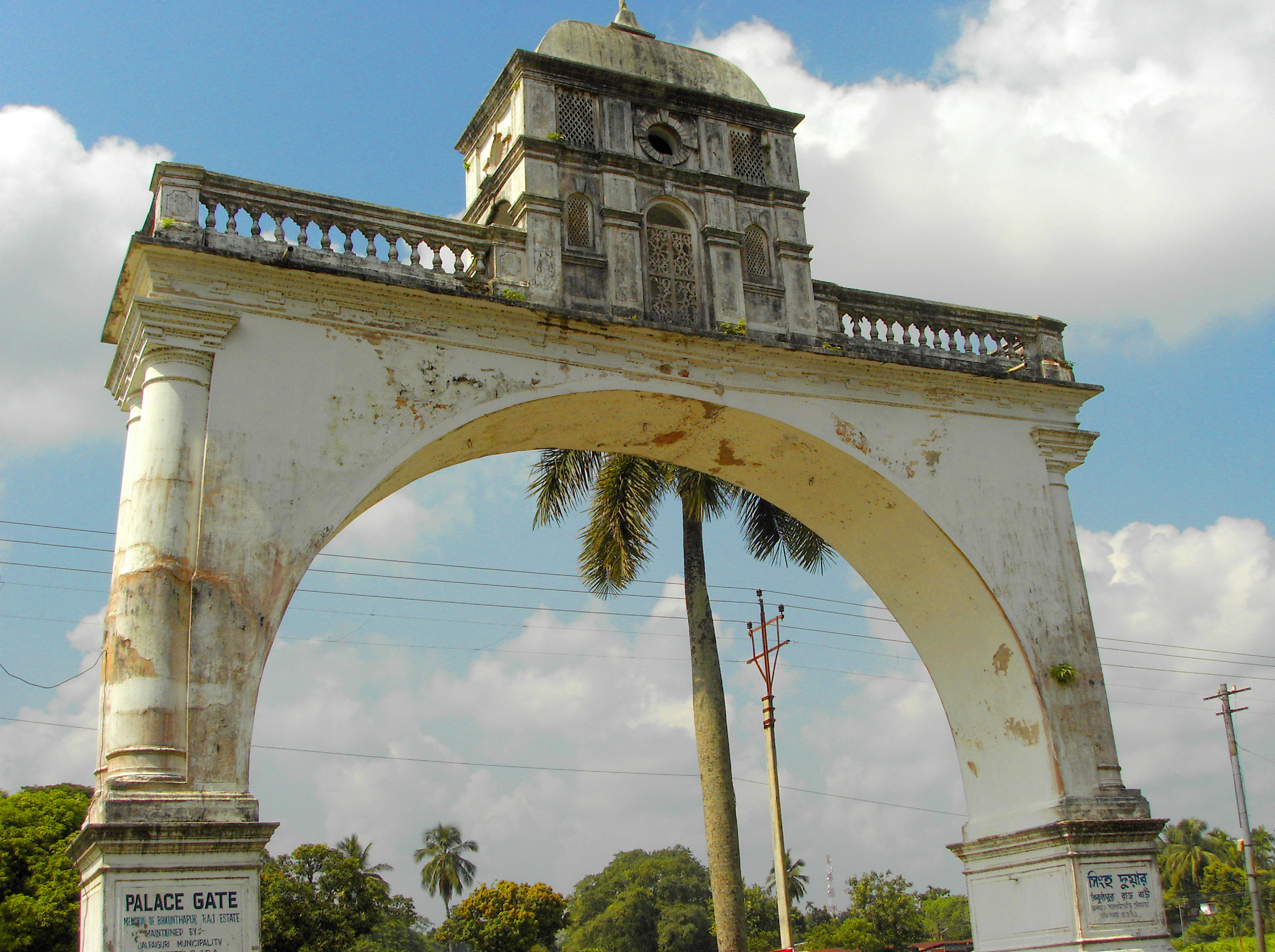
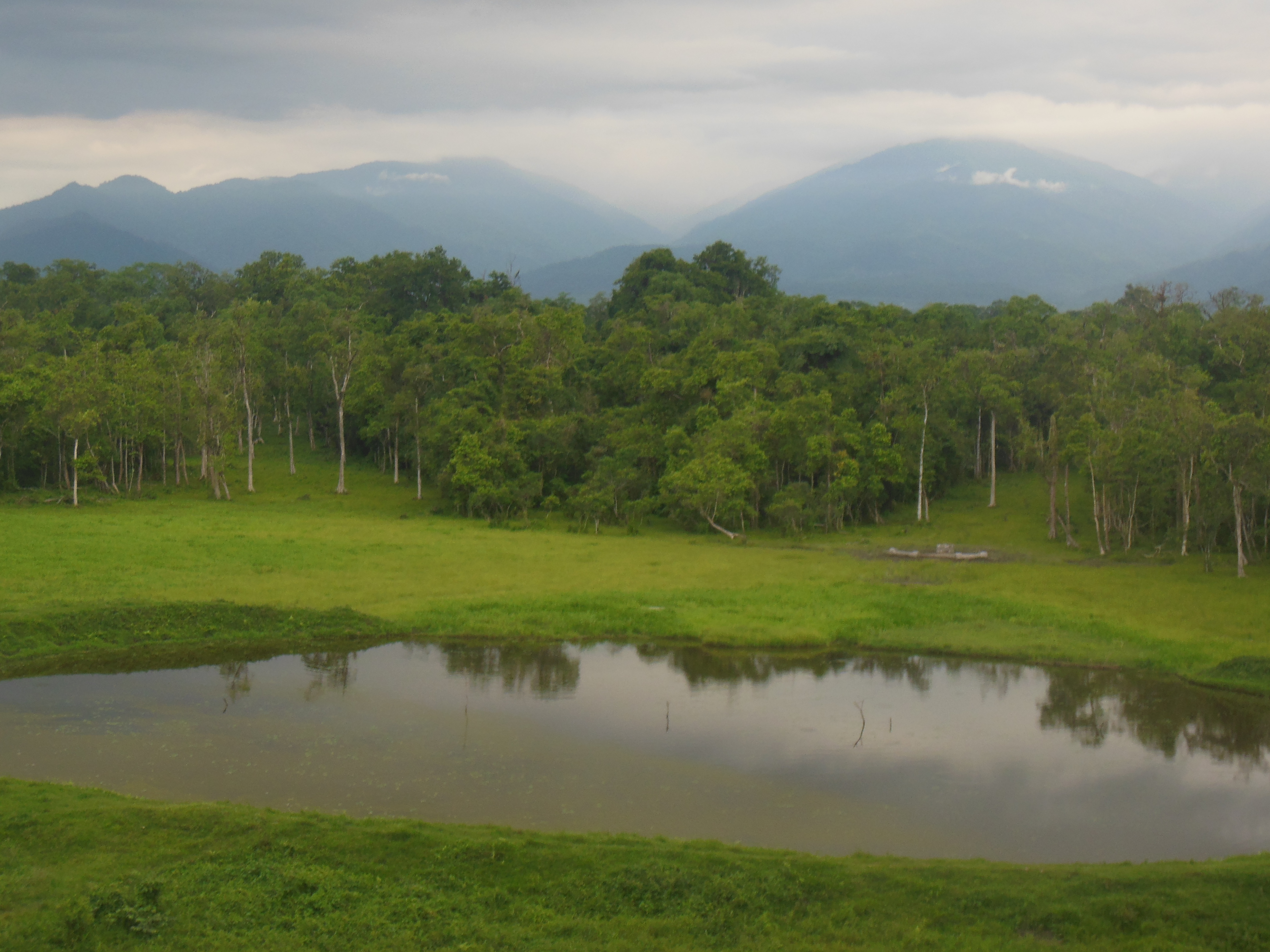
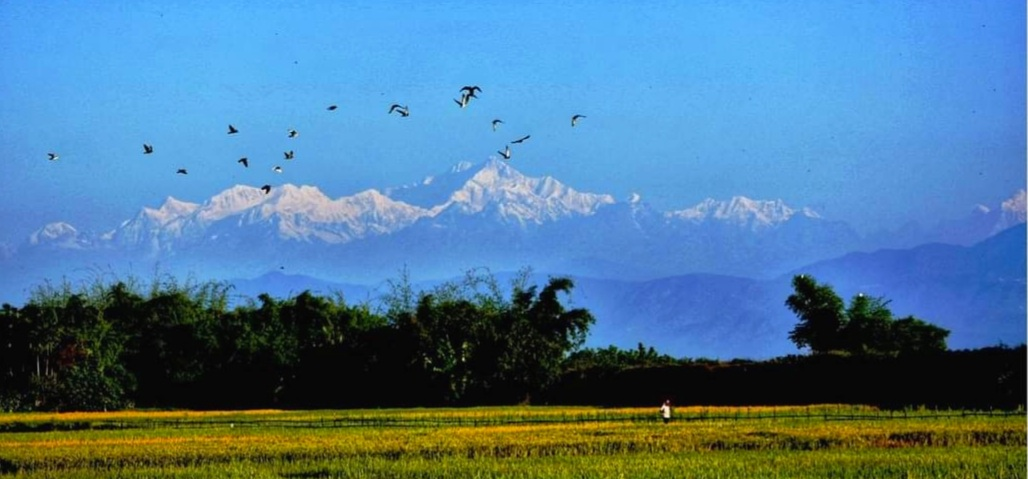
- Clockwise from top: Neora Tea Estate, Raikut Palace, Himalayas from Jalpaiguri, Sevoke bridge over the Teesta, Champramary Wildlife Sanctuary

- Location of Jalpaiguri district in West Bengal
- Coordinates: 26°41′N 88°45′E
- Country: India
- State: West Bengal
- Division: Jalpaiguri
- Headquarters: Jalpaiguri

Government
  - Subdivisions: Jalpaiguri Sadar, Malbazar, Dhupguri
  - CD Blocks: Jalpaiguri, Maynaguri, Rajganj, Mal, Matiali, Nagrakata, Kranti, Dhupguri, Banarhat
  - Lok Sabha constituencies: Jalpaiguri
  - Vidhan Sabha constituencies: Nagrakata, Dhupguri, Maynaguri, Mal, Dabgram-Phulbari, Jalpaiguri, Rajganj

Area
  - Total: 3,386 km^{2} (1,307 sq mi)

Population (2011)
  - Total: 2,381,596
  - Density: 703.4/km^{2} (1,822/sq mi)
  - Urban: 752,805

Demographics
  - Literacy: 84.79 per cent
  - Sex ratio: 954 ♂/♀

Languages
  - Official: Bengali
  - Additional official: English
- Time zone: UTC+05:30 (IST)
- Website: www.jalpaiguri.gov.in

Jalpaiguri district (Bengali pronunciation: [d͡ʒɔlpai̯guɽi]) is a district of the Indian state of West Bengal. The district was established in 1869 during British Raj. The headquarters of the district are in the city of Jalpaiguri, which is also the divisional headquarters of Jalpaiguri division.

== History ==
Jalpaiguri district comprises western Dooars and the major part of the eastern Morang and this area, according to Sailen Debnath, in the ancient time was a part of the kingdom of Kamarupa, and since the medieval period it became a part of Kamata kingdom. Sailen writes that three of the five ancient capitals of Kamatapur were geographically in the district of Jalpaiguri; and the three capitals were at Chilapata, Mainaguri and Panchagarh in sequence. According to him, Hingulavas, the first capital of the next Koch kingdom as well was in Jalpaiguri district. Hingulavas has well been identified with Mahakalguri in Alipurduar Sub-Division.

=== Under the Kingdom of Bhutan ===
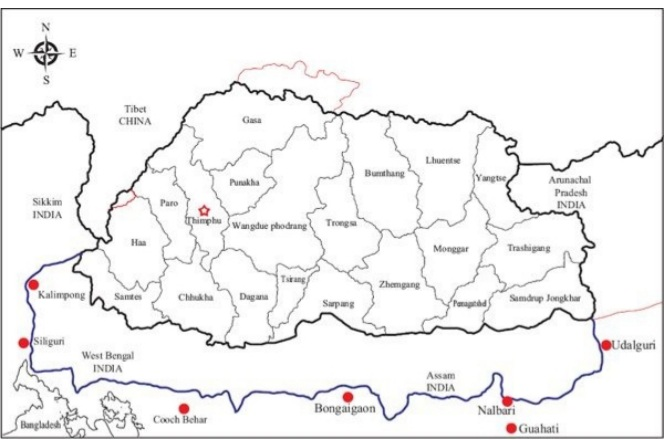
Southern Boundary of Bhutan contained the present Jalpaiguri district before 1865 Duar War

The Dooars in Jalpaiguri district were under the control of Kingdom of Bhutan from early 17th-century till 1865 when British East India company captured the area in the Duar War under the Treaty of Sinchula and were added to the district of Jalpaiguri in 1869 and later finally to the Indian Union in 1949.

Like all the Duars under Druk Gyalpo of Bhutan, it was under the jurisdiction of Tongso Penlop, below the Tongso Penlop were Subah who in turn appointed Mondal, Laskar or Uzir to look after the Duars.

== Geography ==
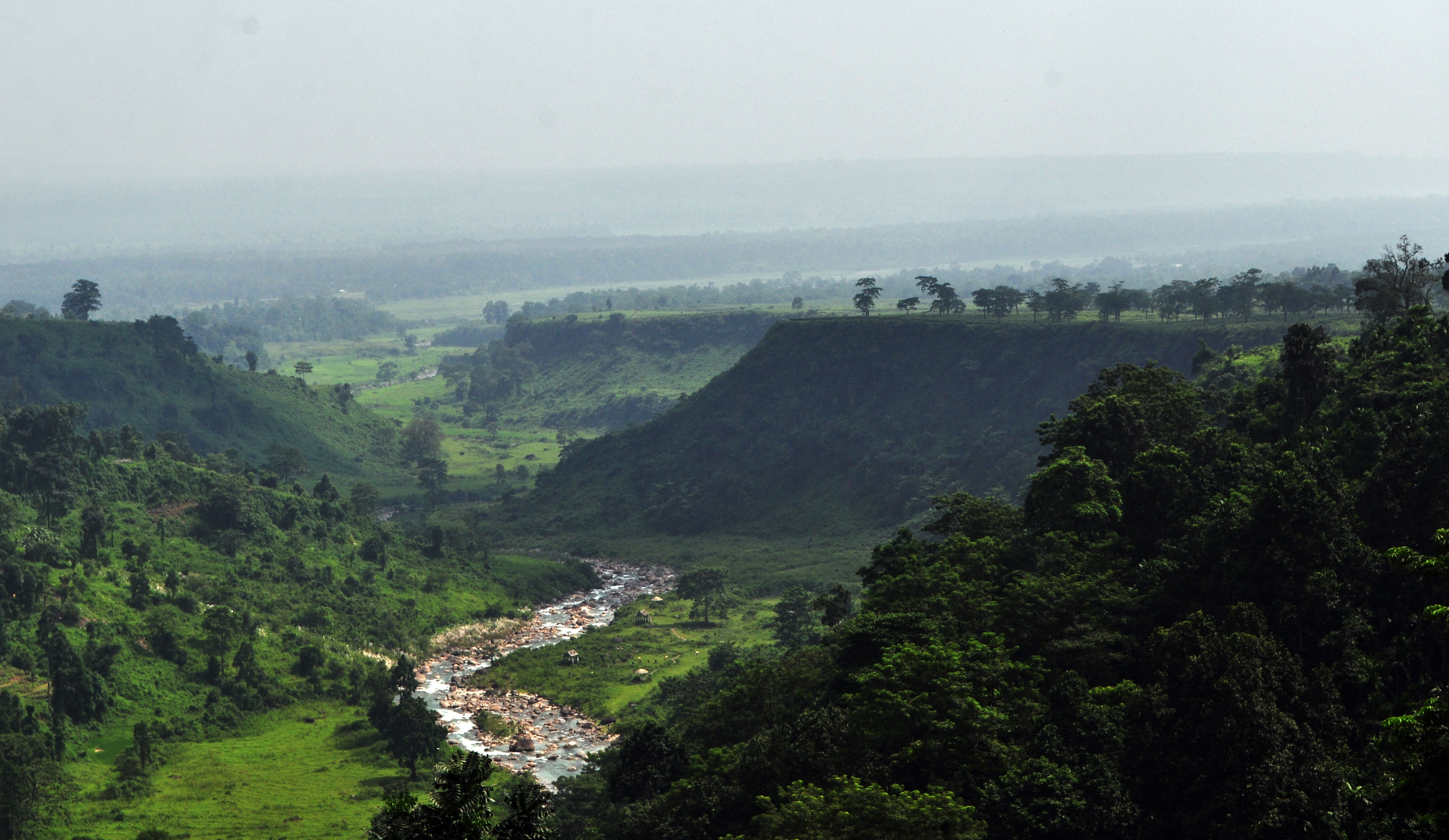
Samsing in Jalpaiguri district

Jalpaiguri is a part of West Bengal which is situated in North Bengal.

The district situated in the northern part of West Bengal has international borders with Bhutan and Bangladesh in the north and south respectively and district borders with Darjeeling hills in the west and northwest and Alipurduar district and Cooch Behar district on the east.

National protected areas include the Gorumara National Park and the Chapramari Wildlife Sanctuary, the Pakhibitan Wildlife Sanctuary, the Baikunthapur Forest, the Khuttimary Forest, etc. reserve forest.

=== Climate ===
Jalpaiguri is part of monsoon climate zone of South-Eastern Asia. May is the hottest month of this region with average maximum temperature of about 32 °C whereas January is coldest with 11 °C. Highest ever recorded maximum and minimum temperature are 40 °C and 2 °C. The average annual humidity in the district is of 82%. The annual average rainfall is 3160mm. December is the driest month with average rainfall 0.2 mm and July is wettest with 809.3 mm. Number of rainy days are 0 to 1 during November to February and 24 days during July. Thunderstorms are common weather phenomenon during May.

== Divisions ==
=== Sub-divisions ===
Jalpaiguri district have three sub-divisions – Jalpaiguri Sadar subdivision, Mal subdivision and Dhupguri subdivision.

Jalpaiguri district earlier had three sub-divisions – Jalpaiguri Sadar subdivision, Mal subdivision and Alipurduar subdivision. Alipurduar district was created in June 2014 and Jalpaiguri district was left with two subdivisions – Jalpaiguri Sadar and Mal. Dhupguri subdivision is a administrative division of Jalpaiguri district. It was formed by dividing Jalpaiguri Sadar subdivision.

Municipalities: Jalpaiguri, Malbazar, Mainaguri, Dhupguri

Jalpaiguri Sadar subdivision comprises a portion of Siliguri Municipal Corporation, Jalpaiguri Municipality, Maynaguri Municipality, Rajganj community development block, Jalpaiguri community development block and Maynaguri community development block

Dhupguri subdivision comprises Dhupguri Municipality, Dhupguri community development block and Banarhat community development block

Malbazar subdivision comprises Malbazar Municipality, Mal community development block, Kranti community development block, Matiali community development block, Nagrakata community development block

=== Police stations ===
There are 16 police stations in the district, viz.:

1. Banarhat
2. Bhaktinagar
3. Binnaguri (Phari)
4. Chalsa
5. Dhupguri
6. Domohani (Phari)
7. Gairkata
8. Jalpaiguri (Kotwali)
9. Kranti Hat (Phari)
10. Malbazar
11. Matelli (Phari)
12. Mainaguri
13. Nagrakata
14. New Jalpaiguri
15. Patkata (Phari)
16. Rajganj

=== Telephone districts ===
There are six telephone area codes of Jalpaiguri district. They are 03561, 03562, 03563, 03564, 03565, 03566.

=== Assembly constituencies ===
As per order of the Delimitation Commission in respect of the delimitation of constituencies in the West Bengal, the district is divided into seven assembly constituencies:

No.	Name	Lok Sabha	MLA	2021 Winner	2024 Lead
15	Dhupguri (SC)	Jalpaiguri	Nirmal Chandra Roy	Trinamool Congress	Bharatiya Janata Party
16	Maynaguri (SC)	Jalpaiguri	Kaushik Roy	Bharatiya Janata Party	Bharatiya Janata Party
17	Jalpaiguri (SC)	Jalpaiguri	Pradip Kumar Barma	Trinamool Congress	Bharatiya Janata Party
18	Rajganj (SC)	Jalpaiguri	Khageshwar Roy	Trinamool Congress	Trinamool Congress
19	Dabgram-Phulbari	Jalpaiguri	Shikha Chatterjee	Bharatiya Janata Party	Bharatiya Janata Party
20	Mal (ST)	Jalpaiguri	Bulu Chik Baraik	Trinamool Congress	Trinamool Congress
21	Nagrakata (ST)	Alipurduars	Puna Bhengra	Bharatiya Janata Party	Trinamool Congress

Malbazar and Nagrakata constituencies are reserved for Scheduled Tribes candidates. Dhupguri, Maynaguri, Jalpaiguri and Rajganj constituencies are reserved for Scheduled Caste candidates. Along with one assembly constituency from Cooch Behar district, Dhupguri, Maynaguri, Jalpaiguri, Rajganj, Dabgram-Phulbari, and Malbazar constituencies form Jalpaiguri (Lok Sabha constituency), which is reserved for Scheduled Castes.

== Transport ==
One can avail train from the major railway stations in the vicinity like New Jalpaiguri railway station, Jalpaiguri, Jalpaiguri Road, New Maynaguri railway station, New Mal Junction railway station. By road it is connected with rest of the country. Air travel is available up to Bagdogra Airport, and from there it is connected by a 20 km expressway from the district border.

== Demographics ==
Historical population
Year	Pop.	±%
1901	546,764	—
1911	663,222	+21.3%
1921	695,946	+4.9%
1931	740,993	+6.5%
1941	847,841	+14.4%
1951	916,747	+8.1%
1961	1,359,292	+48.3%
1971	1,750,159	+28.8%
1981	2,214,871	+26.6%
1991	2,800,543	+26.4%
2001	3,401,173	+21.4%
2011	3,872,846	+13.9%
Source: Census of India

According to the 2011 census Jalpaiguri district had a population of 3,872,846, roughly equal to the nation of Liberia. This gives it a ranking of 66th in India (out of a total of 640). The district has a population density of 621 inhabitants per square kilometre (1,610/sq mi) . Its population growth rate over the decade 2001-2011 was 33.77%. Jalpaiguri has a sex ratio of 954 females for every 1000 males, and a literacy rate of 79.79%.

After bifurcation, the district has a population of 2,381,596, of which 752,805 (31.62%) live in urban areas. The residual district has a sex ratio of 956 females per 1000 males. Scheduled Castes and Scheduled Tribes have a population of 1,001,572 (42.05%) and 349,592 (14.68%) of the population respectively.

=== Religion ===
Religion in Jalpaiguri district (2011)
Religion	Percent
Hinduism	82.41%
Islam	13.25%
Christianity	3.12%
Buddhism	0.64%
Other or not stated	0.58%

According to the 2011 Census, the population of present-day Jalpaiguri district was 2,381,596. Hinduism was the predominant religion, followed by 1,962,679 people (82.41%). Islam was practised by 315,478 (13.25%), and Christianity by 74,188 (3.12%). Tribal religions saw a sharp decline, with only 8,950 followers (0.38%). Buddhism had 15,358 adherents (0.64%), while 4,943 people (0.20%) followed other religions.

=== Language ===
Languages of Jalpaiguri district (2011)
1. Bengali (65.6%)
2. Sadri (12.9%)
3. Nepali (4.90%)
4. Hindi (4.69%)
5. 'Other' Bengali (3.80%)
6. Rajbongshi (2.69%)
7. Kurukh (1.39%)
8. Others (4.03%)

According to the 2011 census, 65.57% of the population spoke Bengali, 12.96% Sadri, 4.90% Nepali, 4.69% Hindi, 2.69% Rajbongshi and 1.39% Kurukh as their first language. Other languages spoken include Santali and Munda. Kurukh and other tribal languages such as Kharia and Mundari were once more widespread among the tea tribes as late as the 1960s, but they have since rapidly shifted to Sadri as their mother tongue.

== Ecology ==
It is home to Gorumara National Park, which was established in 1994 and has an area of 79 km^{2} (30.5 mi^{2}). Apart from Gorumara National Park, the district contains Chapramari Wildlife Sanctuary.

== Notable people ==
This is a list of notable people from Jalpaiguri District.

- Promode R. Bandyopadhyay, inventor, research scientist and Technical Program Manager at the Naval Undersea Warfare Center, New Port, Rhode Island, USA
- P. K. Banerjee, football player and coach
- Bappi Lahiri, Indian singer
- Samaresh Majumdar, Bengali author of novels like Uttoradhikar, Kalpurush, and Kaalbela
- Swapna Barman, heptathlete
- Ratan Lal Basu, fiction writer
- Moushumi Bhowmik, singer
- Mimi Chakraborty, Tollywood actress and former Member of Parliament from Jadavpur constituency
- Sukalyan Ghosh Dastidar, Indian footballer of the 1970s
- Kazi Musharraf Hussain, former Education Minister
- Ahmed Hassan Imran, journalist and politician
- Fazlul Karim, politician
- Saifuddin Ahmed Manik, politician
- Manoj Mohammed, footballer
- Asaduzzaman Noor, actor, politician and activist
- Ahmad Fazlur Rahman, first native vice-chancellor of the University of Dacca
- Latifur Rahman, business magnate and media mogul
- Khaleda Zia, Former Prime Minister of Bangladesh from 1991 to 1996 & 2001 to 2006 and chairperson of Bangladesh Nationalist Party
- Taslimuddin Ahmad, lawyer and litterateur
- Anisur Rahman Anis, actor
- Bazlur Rahman Badal, dancer
- Shanti Tigga, first female jawan in the Indian Army.

== Geographical indication ==
Kalonunia rice was awarded the Geographical Indication (GI) status tag from the Geographical Indications Registry under the Union Government of India on 2 January 2024 (valid until 11 March 2034). It is a common and widely cultivated crop in districts of Cooch Behar, Jalpaiguri and Alipurduar along with some parts of Darjeeling & Kalimpong districts of West Bengal.

State Agricultural Management & Extension Training Institute (SAMETI) from Narendrapur, proposed the GI registration of Kalonunia rice. After filing the application in March 2021, the rice was granted the GI tag in 2024 by the Geographical Indication Registry in Chennai, making the name "Kalonunia rice" exclusive to the rice grown in the region. It thus became the third rice variety from West Bengal after Tulaipanji rice and the 26th type of goods from West Bengal to earn the GI tag.

The GI tag protects the rice from illegal selling and marketing, and gives it legal protection and a unique identity.

== See also ==
- Sakati Jhakua Para
