= Aeneas Francon Williams =

Scottish missionary, chaplain and writer (1886–1971)

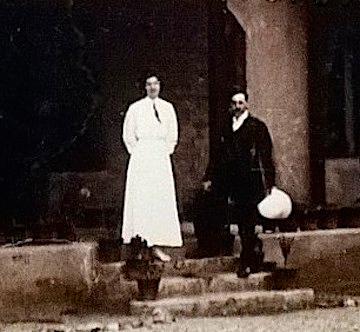
- Williams (right, holding a hat) standing on the steps of Wolseley House, Kalimpong 1914
- Born: 17 February 1886; Liscard, Wirral, Cheshire, Britain
- Died: 9 December 1971 (aged 85); Sheffield, Yorkshire
- Occupations: Missionary; minister; chaplain; teacher; writer; poet
- Spouse: Clara Anne Rendall
- Children: 2
- Parent(s): John Francon Williams; Barbara Balmain Dougall

Aeneas Francon Williams, FRSGS (17 February 1886 – 9 December 1971) was a Minister of the Church of Scotland, a missionary, chaplain, writer, and poet. Williams was a missionary in the Eastern Himalayas and China and writer of many published works.

== Family ==
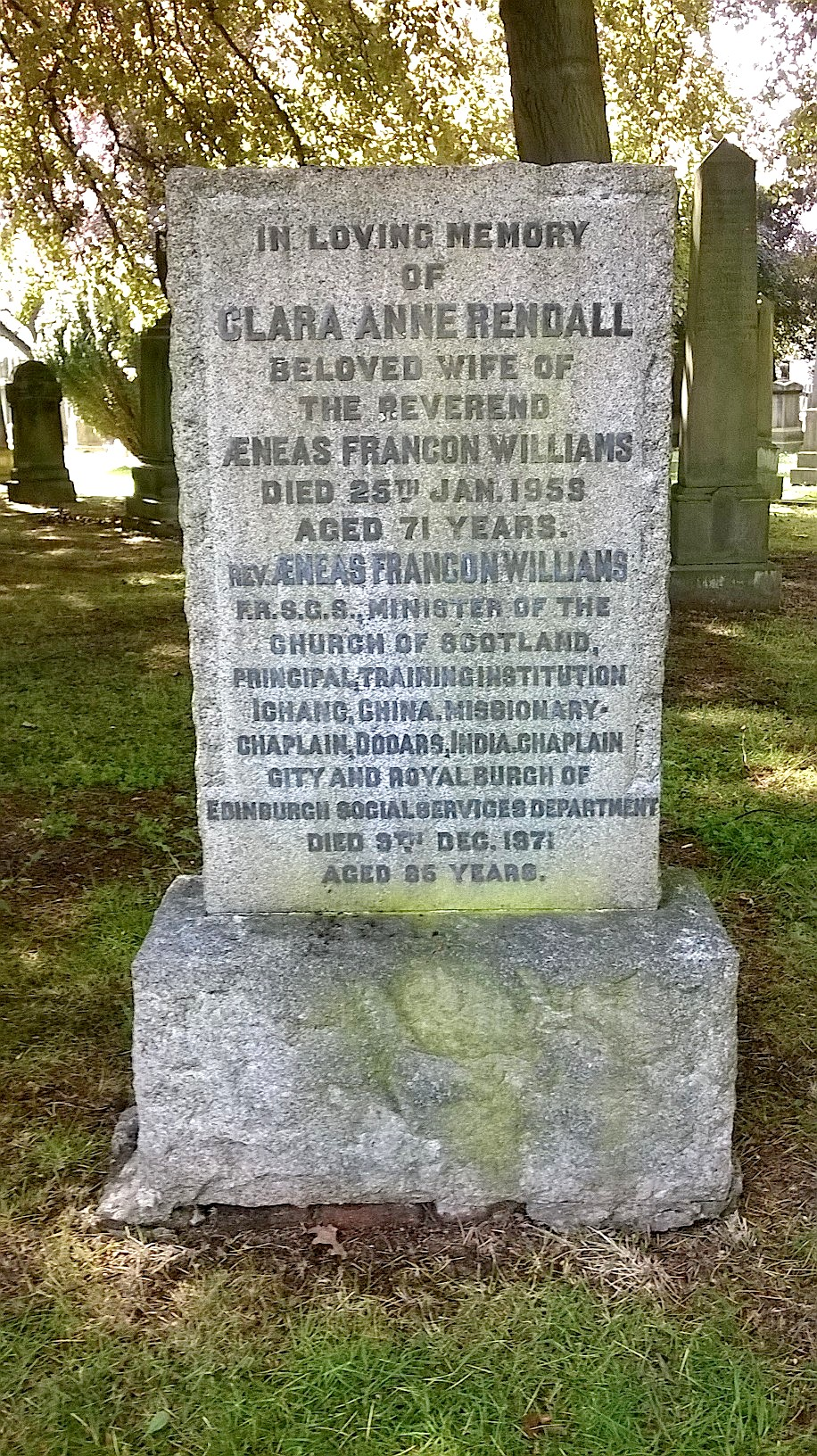
The gravestone of Aeneas Francon Williams and his wife Clara Anne Rendall at Dean Cemetery, Edinburgh

Aeneas Francon Williams was born at 15 Leonard Street, Liscard, Wirral, Cheshire, the second son of four to John Francon Williams FRGS, and Barbara Balmain Dougall. Aeneas had three brothers, John Balmain, David Dougal Williams FRSA and George Stanley, and a sister, Margaret Mary Ann Williams. Aeneas was baptized at St. Peter's Church, Liverpool, on 20 July 1886. During Aeneas's formative years, he was educated privately. From 1900 to 1906, Aeneas attended the Technical Institute and Student Teacher Centre in Walthamstow, and from 1906 to 1908, he attended the University of Edinburgh and Moray House Training College. In 1932 Aeneas returned to Edinburgh, where he studied at the University of Edinburgh New College for a further two years.

Aeneas's father, John Francon Williams, born in 1854 in the village of Llanllechid in Caernarvonshire, North Wales, was a published writer, newspaper editor, geographer, inventor, historian and cartographer. Aeneas's mother, Barbara, was born in Perthshire, Scotland. By 1901, the Williams family was living at Queens Grove Road in the affluent area of Chingford, Essex, where, on the 1901 England and Wales Census, Aeneas aged 15, is recorded as being an artist and painter.

== Missionary work ==
=== Kalimpong ===
At the age of twenty-four, Aeneas Williams attended the 1910 World Missionary Conference hosted at the Assembly Hall in Edinburgh from 14 to 23 June. The conference is a marker for the beginning of the modern Protestant Christian ecumenical movement. The Church of Scotland missionary John Anderson Graham appeared at the conference both as a guest speaker and as a member of the audience. He was also there to encourage donations to aid his mission St Andrew's Colonial Home in Kalimpong, West Bengal. The Protestant Christian Missionary community slogan drove the conference's spirit: 'The Evangelization of the World in this Generation.' Whether Aeneas attended one meeting, or several is undocumented, but during the event he got his calling to become a missionary. Later that same year, Aeneas arrived in India and was stationed in Kalimpong at St Andrew's Colonial Home (later renamed Dr. Graham's Homes) – an orphanage/school – where he was the assistant schoolmaster and taught mathematics, Geography and Science. As the school expanded, Williams took on the role of Bursar. His official residence was Wolseley House in the grounds of the school. The house was named after Sir Capel Charles Wolseley, 9th Baronet, who was the secretary of the fund-raising delegation London Committee–a committee formed to solicit funds for Indian missions. The committee funded the building of St. George's Homes in Pulney Hills, Kodaikanal, founded by Rev. John Breeden in 1914, which was based upon St Andrew's Colonial Homes, hence the connection. Breeden and Wolseley visited St. Andrew's Colonial Homes to draw up plans for St. George's Homes. Aeneas quickly settled into his life at St. Andrew's as a missionary and took on several other roles, including financial adviser to Dr. John Anderson Graham, and as a fundraiser for the children's home. Kalimpong was the centre of missionary activity in the region, with Darjeeling steadfastly remaining the political powerhouse. In Darjeeling, missionaries played a supporting role to the official political figures and aristocracy that governed the region. In Kalimpong that reversed, missionaries reigned supreme.

On 2 December 1914, Aeneas and Clara Anne Rendall were married at Macfarlane Memorial Church in Kalimpong by Rev. Evan Mackenzie. Dr. John Anderson Graham officiated as best man and a witness at the ceremony. Clara (a true Orcadian) was born on 24 July 1887 in Kirkwall on the Orkney Islands and was also a Church of Scotland missionary and taught French at St. Andrew's Colonial school. Clara's uncle, William Kent (her mother's brother), married Euphemia Janet Rosina Ogilvy of the Clan Ogilvy, a descendant of Robert the Bruce King of Scots.

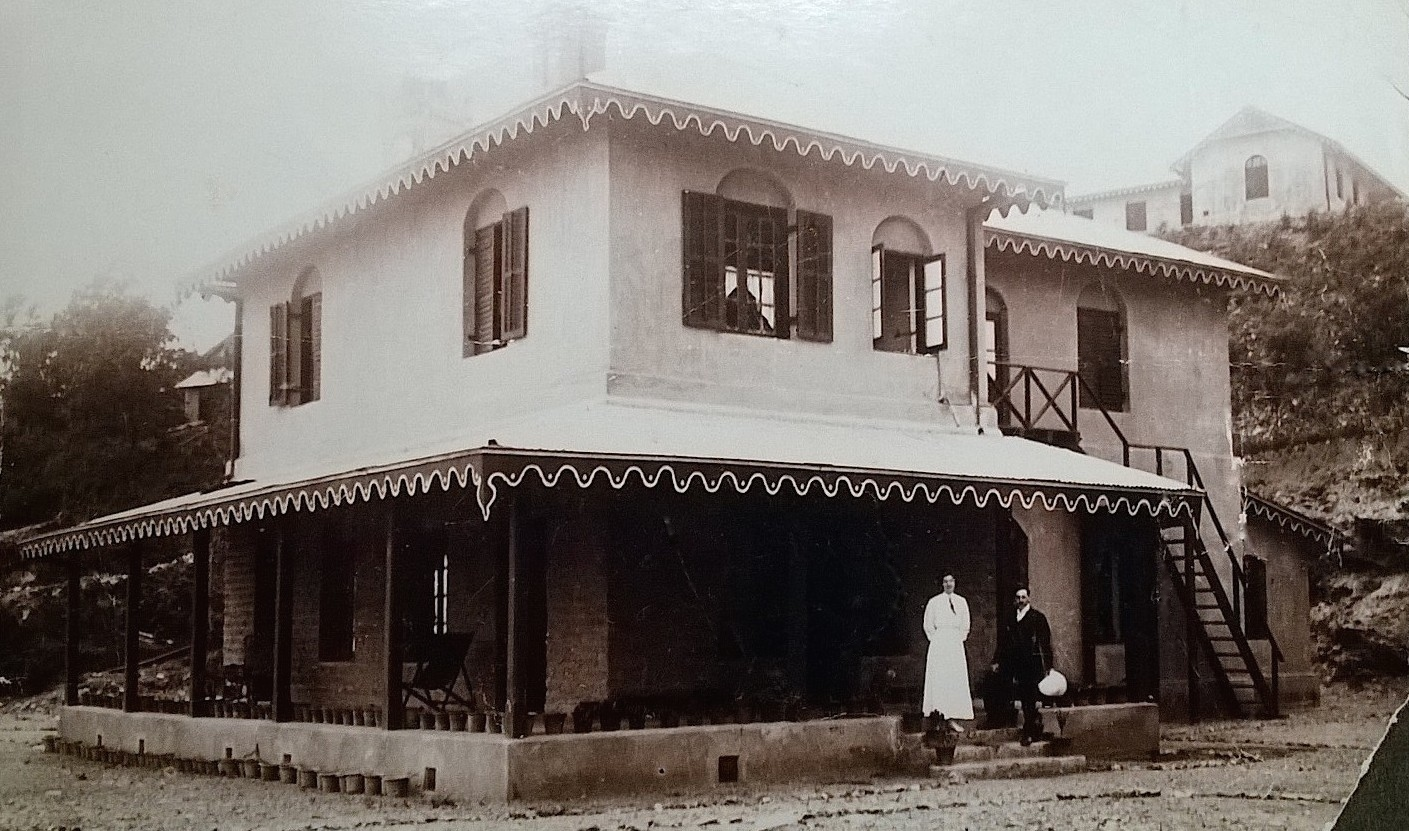
Aeneas Francon Williams (right) on the steps of his residence Wolseley House at St Andrew's Colonial Home, Kalimpong, 1914. St Andrew's Colonial School is on the hill in the background of the picture.

Aeneas was a keen sportsman and footballer and played outside forward (left-wing) in the Grahams' home football team. On 7 October 1916, Clara gave birth to twins, Alfred Francon and Beatrice Clara. Rev. John Anderson Graham baptized Alfred and Beatrice in Kalimpong on 19 November 1916. Aeneas and his growing family remained at St Andrew's Colonial Home until 1924. Williams’ first book, A Pronouncement of the Public Conscience, was published in 1921. At the beginning of January 1921, Aeneas, his wife, and their two young offspring (aged 4) sailed from Calcutta on board the (Peninsular and Oriental Steam Navigation Company Line) SS Soudan en route to the UK. The family arrived in the Port of London on 18 January from where they travelled up to Scotland. It was the first time the two young children Alfred and Beatrice, had visited Britain. During the trip, Aeneas undertook a short fundraising tour in aid of St Andrew's Colonial Home in Kalimpong, during which he gave lantern shows with spoken commentary. His shows were performed on variety bills and in Church Halls. The photographic slides were projected upon a large screen and depicted life at St Andrew's Colonial Home, views of the Eastern Himalayas, and his experience as a missionary in India. One of Williams’ presentations was given at a variety concert at Elie in Fife held on 23 September at which Major-General Sir George Kenneth Scott-Moncrieff introduced the acts. Williams shared the bill with various vocal and instrumental performers, as well as a young dancer.

Aeneas Francon Williams was elected a Fellow of The Royal Scottish Geographical Society (FRSGS) in 1921.

=== 1922 British Mount Everest Expedition ===
The Williams family returned to Kalimpong from the U.K. in early 1922. In late March, St Andrew's Colonial Home played host to the first Mount Everest expedition. There had been a reconnaissance expedition the previous year, but the 1922 expedition was the first attempt to conquer the summit. The main team members were General Charles Granville Bruce, Edward Lisle Strutt, George Mallory, George Ingle Finch, Edward Felix Norton, Henry Treise Morshead, Howard Somervell, Arthur Wakefield, and the photographer and movie maker John Noel. Making up the rest of the team was a large group of Tibetan and Nepalese Sherpa's and porters who tendered the pace of donkey's laden with food and equipment. The party travelled along the Teesta Valley alongside the Teesta River by steam train and arrived at Kalimpong Road Station on 26 March from where they trekked the short distance up the hillside to St Andrew's Colonial Home for three days relaxation. There was much excitement among the staff and children at St Andrew's, with football, golf, and evening group sing-alongs taking place in the main school hall, with members of the expedition partaking in the activities. General Bruce had been charged by Sir Robert Baden-Powell to deliver a letter of praise to the Scout troupe at the Homes, which Aeneas enthusiastically ran. The scene at the school was described next day in a letter from the Honorary Superintendent to Sir Robert Baden-Powell:- ‘We had a great day at the Homes yesterday with General Bruce and his companions. We haven’t had a meeting like it since Lady Baden Powell and you were here. The girls and boys were tense with enthusiasm and joy and yelled themselves hoarse. You can picture the scene with the whole Everest party on the School Hall Platform in front of the Roll of Honour, and you can understand the electric conditions for those who daily gaze Kangchenjunga. You, too, know how your old chum (General Bruce) of boyhood and in Army Scouting – so big and yet so genial and gentle – would hold the children spellbound when he – the embodiment of 'highest' endeavour – read your message to them, first in English and then in a Gurkha translation to the contingent of local Himalayan Scouts from the Mission Training School. Mr. Williams (Aeneas) promptly seized the manuscript to hang it up in the Pickford Scout Den beside your drawing of Jack Cornwell and your own signed photograph!’ The following day, the expedition party split in two, with one group staying behind to await delivery of the oxygen canisters, and the other, with General Bruce and the Sherpa's leaving for base camp. Aeneas, his wife Clara, and their two six-year-old children were at the centre of the hospitality, with Wolseley House (among other houses in the school compound) providing temporary accommodation for the lead mountaineers. At the end of their stay, the expedition headed off to Phari Dzong and further on to Kampa Dzong, which they reached on 11 April. They arrived at Rongbuk Glacier base camp on 1 May. Alas, the expedition's attempt to ascent Everest turned out to be unsuccessful. John Noel produced a movie of the expedition titled Climbing Mount Everest (1922). The film shows the team arriving on a steam train at Kalimpong Road Station and at St. Andrew's Colonial Home, although footage taken inside the school compound is not included in the movie. The 1922 expedition did establish a new world record climbing height of 8,326 metres (27,320 ft). The team's next attempt to conquer Everest took place in 1924. It was during this expedition that George Mallory and his companion Andrew Irvine made an attempt to reach the summit together but, at some point, died in a fall. However, until this day, it is still unsure whether or not the pair did reach the summit. Mallory and Irvine were last seen on 8 June 1924. Mallory's frozen body was retrieved in 1999. Irvine's left boot with his frozen foot inside was discovered on Everest in 2024, 100 years after his disappearance. As of yet, the rest of Irvine's body has not been found.

In 1923, Sheldon Press published Aeneas Williams’ instructional hardback, Everyone's Book of the Weather. ‘A pleasant and instructive little book,’ said the Sheffield Daily Telegraph in their review of it. The Scotsman found it, ‘a readable, instructive, and usefully illustrated manual.’ Williams wrote the book in Kalimpong during his time working at St Andrew's Colonial Home. In the preface, he explains his reasons for writing it, and by doing so hopes the book will reach a wider readership than a book about weather might ordinarily do; ‘In these days of wireless reports, meteorological charts and forecasts, journeys by aeroplane or airship, scientific farming and plantation work and the like, interest in the weather is becoming more and more widespread, and a knowledge of atmospheric phenomena is useful as well as fascinating. The object of the present work is to present the facts of meteorology to the general reader in a popular form, and to show how observers equipped with quite simple instruments can find pleasure as well as profit in the study of weather conditions.’ Two years later, Macmillan Publishers published Surveying for Everyone, another of Williams’ instructional hardbacks aimed at scholars.

=== Yichang, China ===
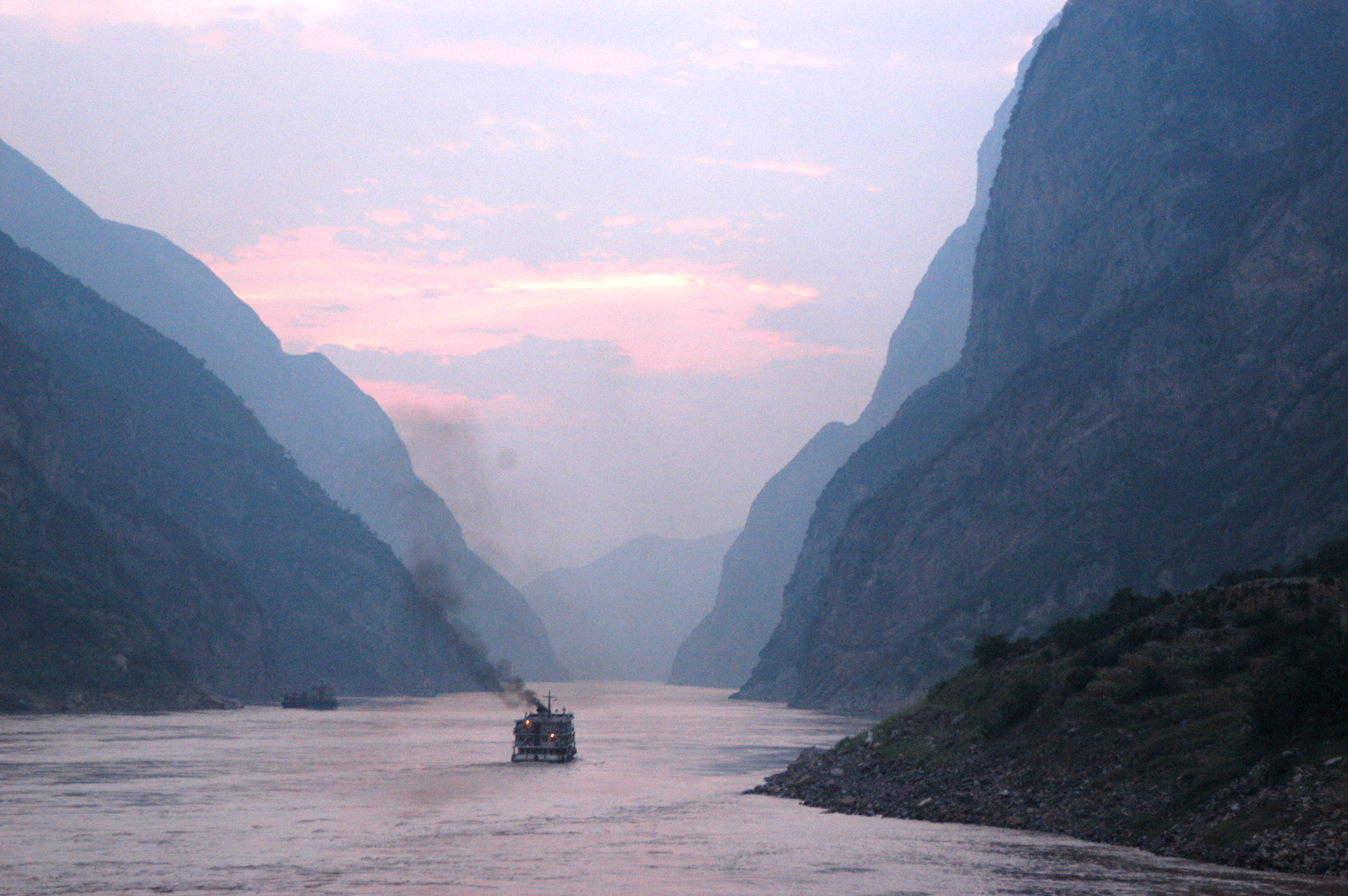
Dusk on the Yangtze River

On 5 February 1924, Aeneas and Clara, with their two young children (aged seven), sailed from Calcutta aboard SS Hosang (Indo-China Steam Navigation Company) to Shanghai, China. Upon their arrival, they then caught a steamer and sailed 1,000 miles up the Yangtze River to the Church of Scotland (Training Institution) in Yichang (then romanized as "Ichang"). Here, Aeneas was Principal at the Anglo-Chinese College Mission in Yichang from 1924 to 1927. Alfred and Beatrice attended the private Redcroft School in the resort of Guling, where they boarded during the school terms. Aeneas and Clara immediately took Chinese language lessons, and both became fluent in Mandarin. The port of Yichang was one of four ports open to foreign trade, and the highest reached by steamers. The city of Yichang was situated right in the center of China, on a low promontory on the North bank of the Yangtze River. It was a prefectural city of considerable importance in the province of Hubei, and conveniently situated as a mart for the tea trade of Hoh-fung-chow. Opium was also grown in the district, as was the tung tree, from which tung oil is extracted. ‘The China Inland Mission possessed a number of unique features which set it apart from established missionary societies and gave it an intensity and, perhaps, a glamour, which other more conventional organisations must have envied.’ During his stay in China, Aeneas wrote the poem Voice of an Oracle (in Old China). In December 1926, Aeneas received a worrying letter from the Church of Scotland offices in Edinburgh talking of anxious happenings in Hankou and the possibility of a General Strike in China. In the House of Commons, the Foreign Secretary Austen Chamberlain intimated that the British Government was talking of taking immediate steps to protect U.K. nationals stationed in China. The letter also mentioned that alternative arrangements had been made for the Williams' two 10-year-old children, Alfred and Beatrice. Soon after, Clara and her two children departed from China for their safety and sailed to the U.K.

Warlords governed the Northern provinces of China. In a bid to get rid of them, The Northern Expedition, led by Chiang Kai-shek—commander-in-chief of the National Revolutionary Army, was launched on July 1, 1926. They aimed to crush the Manchurian warlords to reunify the republic. In early-1927, during the Expedition, Chiang Kai-shek met with Aeneas Francon Williams at the Training Institution at Yichang (where Williams was Principal) and held a meeting at which Aeneas brokered a deal agreeing that NRA troops passing through the district would be "allowed to use hostels, kitchens, etc." at the Institution. The following year, the National Revolutionary Army achieved their campaign, and Chiang Kai-shek became the ruler of China.

When Clara and her two children arrived back in the U.K., they travelled to Edinburgh, where they temporarily resided with Clara's brother in Leith. Due to the political instability in China and the uncertainty of whether Clara and her children could return, the two children attended school in Edinburgh, Alfred at George Watson's Boys’ College, Edinburgh, and Beatrice at George Watson's Ladies’ College, Edinburgh. Their first term commenced on 11 March 1927, and both children would continue their studies at the college until 26 July 1934. Also, in March 1927, due to growing civil unrest in Yichang and localised uprisings in the surrounding province, Aeneas was advised by the British Consulate to leave China for his own safety. Aeneas departed Shanghai on 4 April 1927 just before the Shanghai massacre occurred on 12 April 1927. From Shanghai, Aeneas sailed to British Columbia on missionary work, and then to Vancouver. In late April 1927, Aeneas sailed from the Port of Saint John, New Brunswick, Canada, on board the SS Montclare (Canadian Pacific Line). The ship arrived in Liverpool, England, on 1 May, from where he journeyed to Edinburgh to be reunited with his wife and two children who were now staying at 22 Queen Street, Edinburgh.

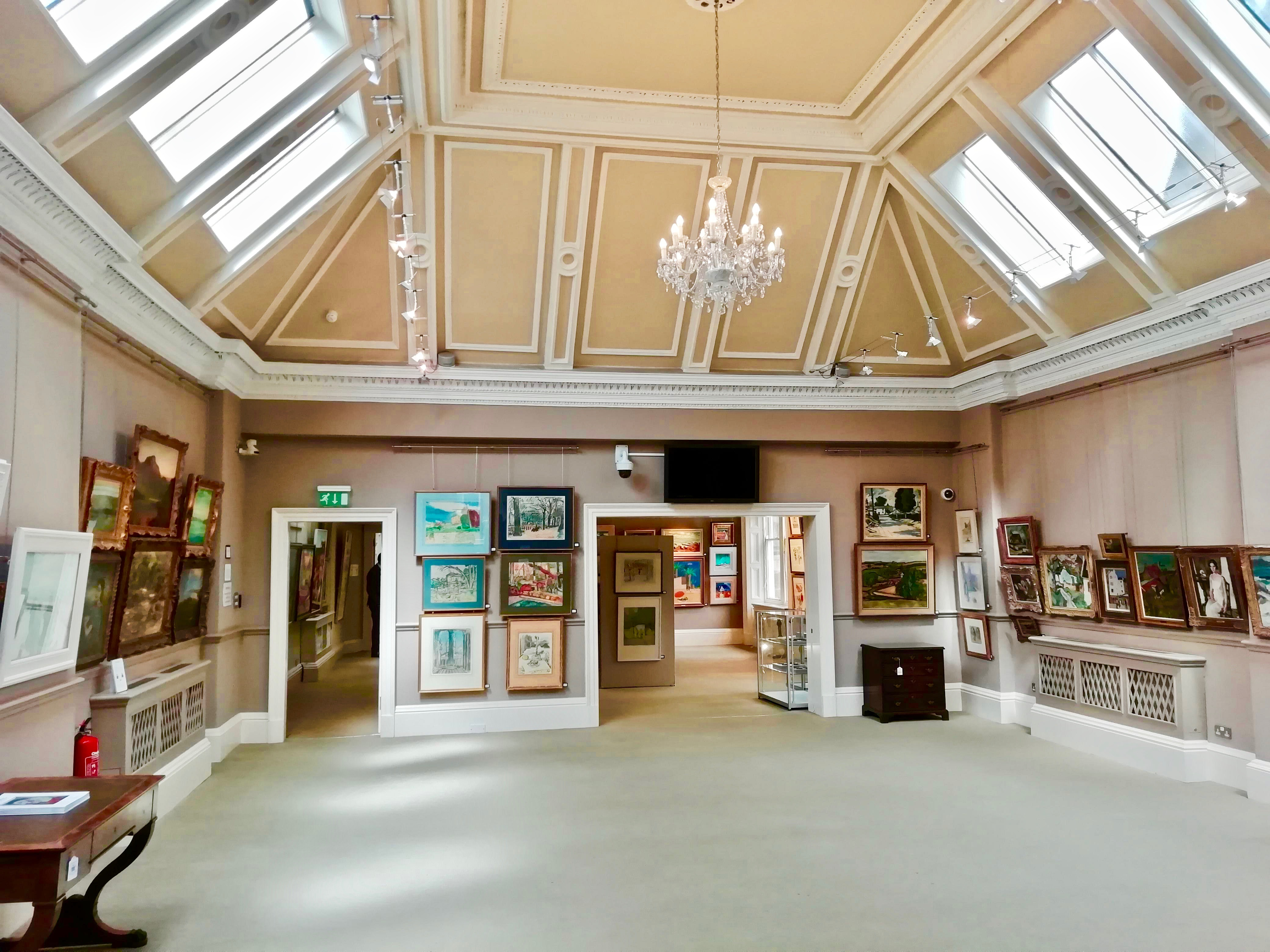
The Ballroom at 22 Queen Street, Edinburgh

In October 1927, while in the U.K., Aeneas was invited to attend the annual Church of Scotland Young Men's Guild Conference held in Kirkcaldy, Fife, over the weekend commencing Friday 21 October. The main objectives of the conference were to revive interest in the work of the Guild, and to demonstrate anew the value and usefulness of such an organization as auxiliary of Church life. Two halls were booked for the occasion, the Beveridge and Adam Smith Halls. On Friday evening, Aeneas gave a missionary address at the Beveridge Hall about his work in Kalimpong and Yichang. It was at the 1888 meeting of the Guild held in the town of Kirkcaldy that Dr. John Anderson Graham made the momentous decision and choice to establish a charitable school for destitute children in India, and was thus ordained as the first missionary supported by the Guild. It was with high regard that Aeneas had been invited to represent the now thriving St. Andrew's Colonial School and Homes in Kalimpong upon which honors from the Indian and British Governments’ had since poured. The Central Committee of Management of the Guild, headed by the chairman Rev. T.B. Stewart Thomson, had compiled an interesting program of events throughout the weekend. The conference opened with a civic reception by the Provost and Magistrates at the Beveridge Hall on the Friday, followed by a welcoming tea, after which Aeneas gave his missionary address at Beveridge Hall. The conference concluded on Sunday evening with a public meeting at the Adam Smith Hall with guest speakers the Right Hon. William Murdoch Adamson M.P. and the Very Rev Dr. John White DD LLD, ex-Moderator of the General Assembly of the Church of Scotland.

=== Mahakalguri, West Bengal ===
In late 1927, Aeneas and Clara returned to India, and were stationed at Mahakalguri, Eastern Dooars (Duars). Here Aeneas took on the role of missionary Pastor. Their two children Alfred and Beatrice, remained in Edinburgh to continue their studies at George Watson's College. The Church of Scotland ran a children's home in the little country village of Duddingston, near Edinburgh, which was founded specifically for children of foreign missionaries, whose parents were unable to take their children abroad with them. The home was called Home House and run by Miss Paterson (a Deaconess of the Church of Scotland) and her sister Minnie. The two sisters were referred to as ‘Aunty’ by the children. The house in Old Church Lane had a large rear garden and was close enough to Edinburgh for the children to attend school there, yet surrounded by the bracing fresh air of the open countryside. It was at Home House that Alfred and Beatrice boarded during part of their education at George Watson's College. Alfred later boarded with the Headmaster of George Watson's Boys' College George Robertson and his wife at their family home.

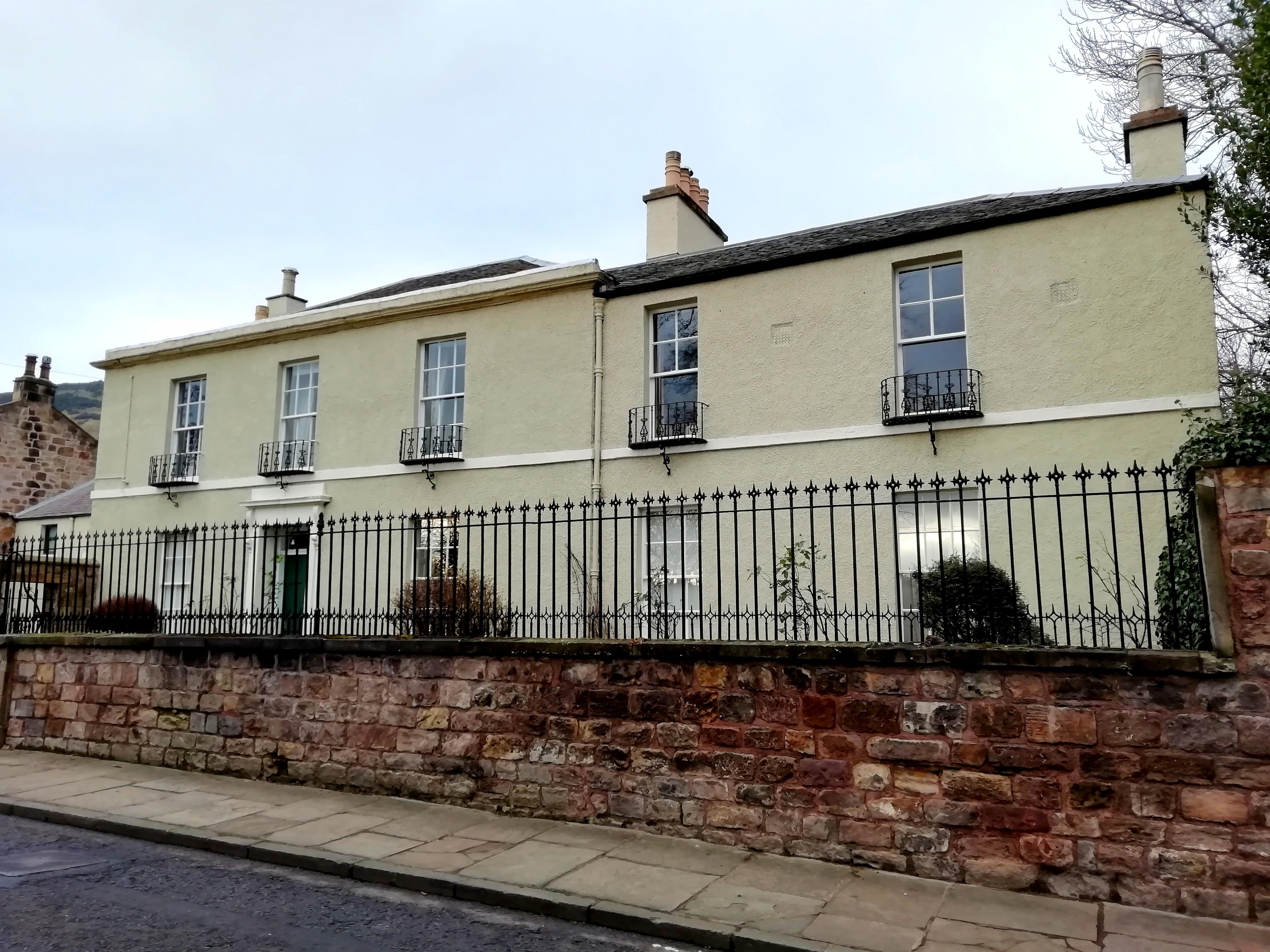
The former Home House, Old Church Lane, Duddingston, Edinburgh

In Jalpaiguri, on 16 January 1928, Aeneas and his wife, Clara, were appointed non-official visitors of the Alipur Duar Dub-Jail in the district of Jalpaiguri for a period of two years by the Commissioner of the Rajshahi Division. Also in 1928, Aeneas was licensed by the Presbytery of Eastern Himalaya. In November of that same year he took his holy orders and was ordained by the Presbytery at Siliguri in North Bengal. https://archive.org/details/clippingsmimeogr00unse_62/page/n43/mode/2up?q=francon+williams The Presbytery of Edinburgh admitted Williams to the Church of Scotland on 28 May 1932.

=== Matelli, West Bengal ===
In 1929, Aeneas was stationed at the Church of Scotland Guild Mission in Matelli in the Jalpaiguri district of West Bengal, where he was the Minister of the Jalpaiguri Parish. At the Mission compound in Matelli, Aeneas and Clara resided at the Manse. Through its schools – St. Ninian's 'Middle' school, St. Margaret's 'High' school, and its boys and girls Day Schools in Calcutta, a boys school in Chinsura, and the Abbey School, and various primary schools in Budge Budge, and its college – the Church of Scotland Mission offered Christian education from the kindergarten to the university stage.

In 1930, Hymn Book in Jalpaiguri Mech by Aeneas Francon Williams was published. The book was intended for the use of Christians of the Mech Tribes living at the foot of the Himalayas in the Jalpaiguri district. It was the first Hymn Book to be published in this regional dialect of Hindi. While Aeneas was living in Matelli, he owned a Cinchona (quinine) plantation.

On 7 March 1930, Clara, being the only female along with two Babu's, was appointed under the provisions of rule 63(2), Chapter IV of the Bengal Jail Code, as a non-official visitor of the Alipur Duar Suli Jail in the Jalpaiguri district of West Bengal for two years. The appointment of the three non-official visitors was to help rehabilitate the inmates by helping to change the offender's values, motivations, and attitudes, so that they could become contributing members of society upon their release. The non-official visitors would visit the jail periodically and attend to the inmates' requests about their care and welfare. At the end of their visits, they would enter any observations about their time at the jail in the visitor's book. Clara had been a non-official visitor for the previous two years at the Alipur Duar Dub-Jail in the district of Jalpaiguri.

In 1932, Williams visited Scotland, during which he supported as many church events and meetings as he could comfortably fit into his schedule. In late-September, Williams showed his support for the ‘Forward Movement’ campaign launched by West Lothian Churches. At the campaign, he gave a powerful speech detailing his all-absorbing work in India as a missionary. On 3 October, Williams attended the Young Men's Guild of the Linlithgow and Falkirk Council. He addressed the large attendance with more stories of his work and adventures as a missionary in North Bengal. ‘Mr. Williams’ address brought out in a wonderful way the romance of the mission fields, and the speaker dealt in a most interesting manner with his own particular work among the depressed races in the Eastern Duars.’ In 1934, Aeneas and Clara's son Alfred aged eighteen, enrolled at the University of Edinburgh, where he studied medicine for the next six years.

In the summer of 1937, Aeneas and Clara, accompanied by their two offspring, Alfred (a medical student) and Beatrice (a nurse), sailed from Dooars, India, to America where they arrived in New York City on 16 August 1937 aboard SS Caledonia II.

Williams’ first volume of poems Dream Drift, by a Young Lover, was published in 1938. The book was dedicated to his wife, Clara. The suggestion of a Protestant minister being perceived as a ‘young lover’ was a bold move on Williams and the publisher's part. It was certainly uncommon for a minister to reveal a poetic side that included talk of lovemaking. The Dundee Courier, in their appraisal of the work, noted that, ‘Mr. Williams' poems reveal their author in many moods, as a nature lover, sportsman, and lover. Only an angler could have written his poems on Fishing and Wound Up. There is a whimsical, almost ‘Barriesque’ (James M. Barrie) touch about some of his nature poems, which is infinitely attractive.’ ‘Mr. Francon Williams looks through a poet's window and can tell what he sees, as a poet tells, and as those to whom he speaks can understand. Life, in life's vocabulary, lit by a poet's candle, is what he tells to us; and in odd hours of quiet, he is worth listening to.’ The Very Rev. Lauchlan Maclean Watt, DD LLD.

Musicians

There are conductors pale who stand
tiptoe before the band
and all the instrumentalists are dumb
until the white-hot baton
and the thumb of the magician
makes cryptic potion
And with the motion
there comes the strange effusion
of dreamy cadence
like incense smoke
that winds and sways
all ways

— Aeneas Francon Williams, 1938, Dream Drift, by a Young Lover (extract from Musicians)

Aeneas would find small nuggets of inspiration obscured in the noise of life. In his poem, To A Dead Bird, Williams immortalizes a solitary dead bulbul, an Indian nightingale he found lying near a bush in the Manse in Bengal where he lived. He explains, 'I put it in my pocket-handkerchief, and with a little burial service, I laid it to rest in our consecrated burial ground opposite Manse Gate.

To A Dead Bird

You lay so limp and weightless in my hand
that I could scarce believe you were of earth
and not an airy being having birth
in some aloof, imponderable land
I knew the fervour of your evening song
and felt the rapture of your vibrances
the lilting pleasure of new cadences
that tripped the leafy forest trees along

— Aeneas Francon Williams, Let Poets Sing 1945 (extract from To A Dead Bird)

On 13 May 1942, Aeneas and Clara's daughter Beatrice married Dr. Stephen Ian Pugh of Builth Wells, Breconshire, Wales. The couple later emigrated to Tasmania, where they lived their entire lives in Launceston. In 1944, Alfred Williams returned to India from Burma on leave to convalesce (having sustained a war injury), where he stayed with his parents at their Quinine Plantation. In 1945, Aeneas and Clara spent a summer vacation at Kodaikanal, a resort in the Cardamom Hills (Yela Mala), a mountain range in South India, where their son Alfred joined them. Alfred was now a captain in the (Royal Army Medical Corps) attached to the 5th Royal Gurkha Rifles as part of the 7th Infantry Division stationed in Burma, which came under the command of Lieutenant General Sir William Slim. While Aeneas was in the Cardamom Hills he wrote his poem Flowers.

On 1 January 1946, in the New Year Indian Honours List, Clara (Mrs. Francon Williams) was awarded the Kaisar-i-Hind Medal (Emperor of India) Bronze Medal for her work during WWII being in-charge of Red Cross work in Dooars, Bengal.

In 1947, when India was granted Independence, Clara returned to Scotland to set up a home in Edinburgh. Aeneas remained in India at the Mission during the handover. After the inauguration of Indian Independence on 15 August 1947, Aeneas wrote 'Report 1947, The Work of the Church of Scotland Mission in Bengal During a Momentous Year', documenting what he saw and encountered in India during and after the handover. Much rejoicing took place in all the Mission institutions. The new Constitution (not yet fully adopted) guaranteed freedom 'to profess, practice and propagate' any religion. When pupils were asked, now that India was free would they rather there was no teaching about Christianity in school, the answer was always the same, that it was because of such education that they wished to study at the Mission. The Mission had since Independence Day been besieged with new applications for admission. However, Aeneas noted the college was experiencing a communal 'low' in staffing levels, with the shortage of Christian professors becoming an 'anxiety.' The Mission staffing levels had also fallen (to eight women and four men), and the Foreign Mission Committee was doing everything in its power to find recruits. Looking ahead, Aeneas spoke of a 'partnership,' a 'Home Mission,' uniting the Mission of the Church of Scotland in India with the Church in India. In his Report 1947, Aeneas stated: The Indian Church is now alive to her missionary responsibilities in this land and is heartily in favor of the new proposals, but the task is out of all proportion to her present resources, and it is only if the Church of Scotland continues her support in personnel and in finances that it can be accomplished. For the Church as for the nation, it may be that a new day is dawning.

In 1948 after the handover, Aeneas sold his Cinchona plantation and other personal property and returned to the U.K. to join his wife in Edinburgh, where they resided at 46 Belgrave Road. When Aeneas and Clara returned to Edinburgh for good they brought with them their pet chimpanzee named ‘Glyris,’ which lived with them at their home at Belgrave Road.

Aeneas and Clara's son Alfred married Jane Warhurst (née Smith) on 29 March 1950 at St. Aidan's Church, Sheffield, Yorkshire. Jane is a second cousin once removed of the author David Herbert Lawrence through her mother Lillian Rex, whose sister Ada (née Rex), married George Beardsall related to Lawrence's mother Lydia Beardsall.

== Later life ==
Aeneas and Clara were both polyglots; Aeneas spoke eight languages fluently, including Hindi and Mandarin. In Edinburgh, Aeneas was Chaplain of Edinburgh Social Services Department from 1952 and was affiliated with several churches, including the former Stockbridge Free Church and St. Giles Cathedral. He was assistant Chaplain of HMP Edinburgh (Saughton) from 1948 to 1954. As a youngster, Aeneas grew up in a literary household (his father John Francon Williams was a newspaper and journal editor and a published writer of many books). As such, Aeneas was encouraged by his father to pursue writing. Throughout Aeneas's life, he had many books published in various fields of knowledge and was also a published poet. In 1942, upon the death of Dr. John Anderson Graham, Aeneas was commissioned by Oxford University Press to write Dr. Graham's biography for inclusion in their Dictionary of National Biography.

Clara Anne Williams died in Edinburgh on 25 January 1959 and is buried at Dean Cemetery, Edinburgh.

After Clara died, Aeneas sold their house at Belgrave Road and spent time travelling the world, circumnavigating it several times. There is evidence contained in correspondence between Aeneas and the London publishing house MacMillan & Co. Ltd. that he wrote two books during these travels. His regular visits to Australia and New Zealand, and especially Tasmania – where his daughter Beatrice lived in Launceston with her husband, Dr. Stephen Pugh, and their daughter Andrea – appear to have sparked his imagination. Original correspondence from Aeneas to MacMillan held at The Museum of English Rural Life and Special Collections at the University of Reading mentions two new manuscripts he had written relating to his travels that he'd submitted to the publishing house. Whether MacMillan or another company published these books is unclear from the letters, as the books identify with Australasia and may only have been published in that territory, or remained unpublished. The two books in question are Tasmanian Apples and Kiwiland. The later work is possibly associated with the flightless Kiwi bird, which Aeneas had grown particularly fond of during his visits to New Zealand. ‘I fed these interesting flightless birds in Wellington Zoo,’ Aeneas writes keenly to MacMillan. He also fed the tuatara, courtesy of his friend ‘the Superintendent Mr. Curtis,’ who told him where he could see the ‘pre-historic little tuatara, the only true Saurian left on this earth, whose ancestors were at least 3,000,000 years on this planet, long before we were.’ Aeneas also mentions to his publisher that his friend Henry Kelly of the New Zealand Wildlife Department was arranging ‘to send us a live Kiwi, the first Kiwi to be in Scotland.’ After returning from his travels abroad, Aeneas moved into 10 Carlton Street, Stockbridge, Edinburgh, where he lived until his early-80s, before moving to Sheffield, Yorkshire, to live with his son Alfred.

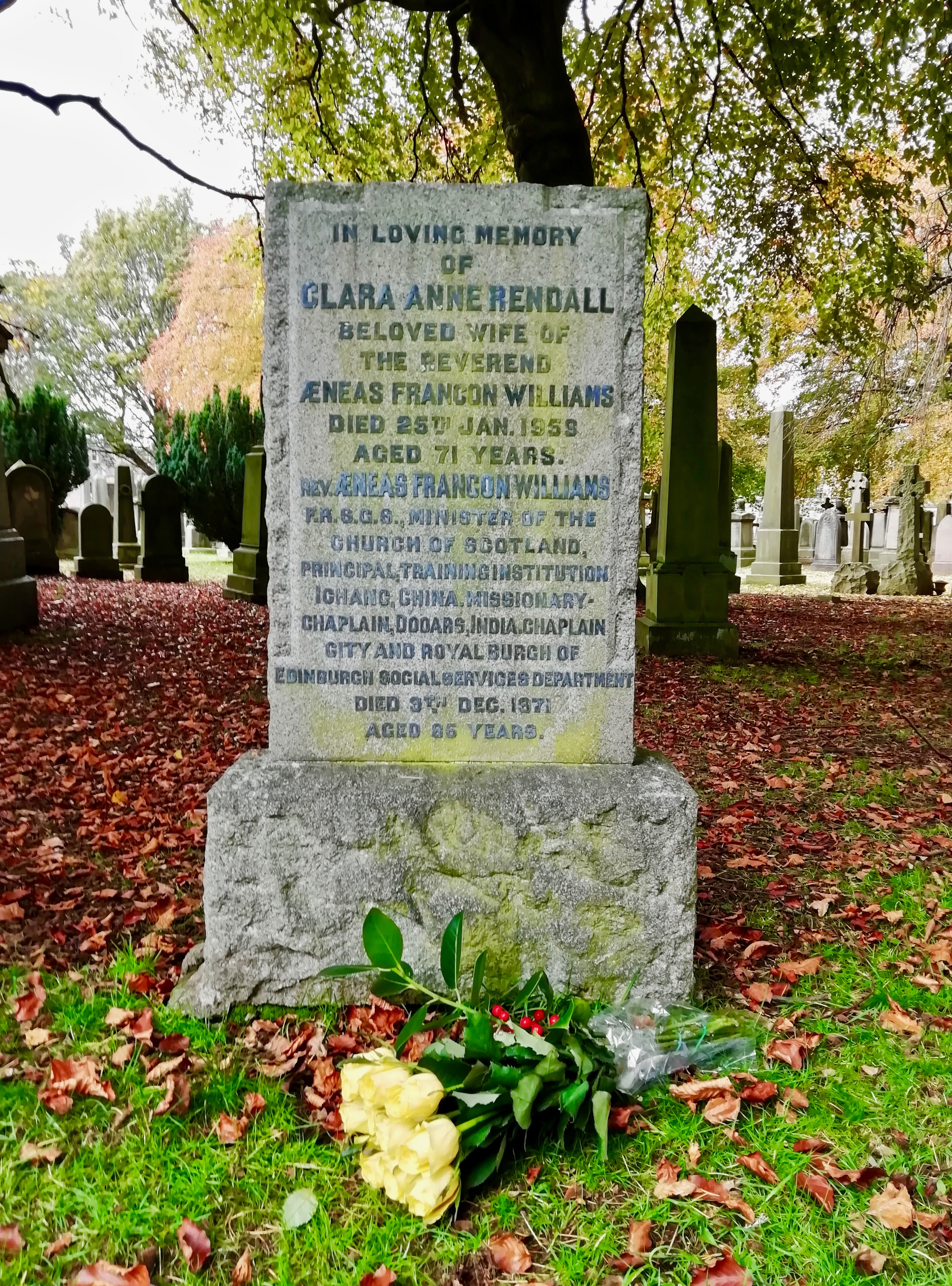
Clara Anne Rendall and Aeneas Francon Williams' gravestone at Dean Cemetery, Edinburgh

Aeneas died in Nether Edge Hospital, Sheffield on 9 December 1971 and is buried with his wife Clara in Dean Cemetery, Edinburgh.

Aeneas Francon Williams is the brother of artist David Dougal Williams and the grandfather of writer Iain Cameron Williams.

On July 2, 1930, Aeneas's American niece Jane Williams married American Edward Burton Hughes. In 1967, Governor Nelson Rockefeller appointed Edward Burton Hughes as Executive Deputy Commissioner of New York State Department of Transportation. In 1970, Edward Burton Hughes founded the E. Burton Hughes Achievement Award given annually to an outstanding department employee of the New York State Department of Transportation.

In April 1995, an early 1920s picture of Aeneas teaching geography in his classroom at St Andrew's Colonial Homes (later renamed Dr. Graham's Homes) in Kalimpong appeared in episode 6, Children of Empire, in the 1995 BBC Two 6-part documentary series Ruling Passions. The episode focuses on the Anglo Indian community in India. It features footage and pictures from Dr. Graham's school in Kalimpong. The image of Aeneas can be seen from 5:42 to 5:55.

On 9 December 2021, Aeneas Francon Williams was remembered in Ireland at the Praying in Advent (during the four-week period leading up to Christmas). Prayers were offered by the Irish Anglican priest Revd. Canon Patrick Comerford. The occasion marked the 50-year anniversary of Williams's death.

== Awards ==
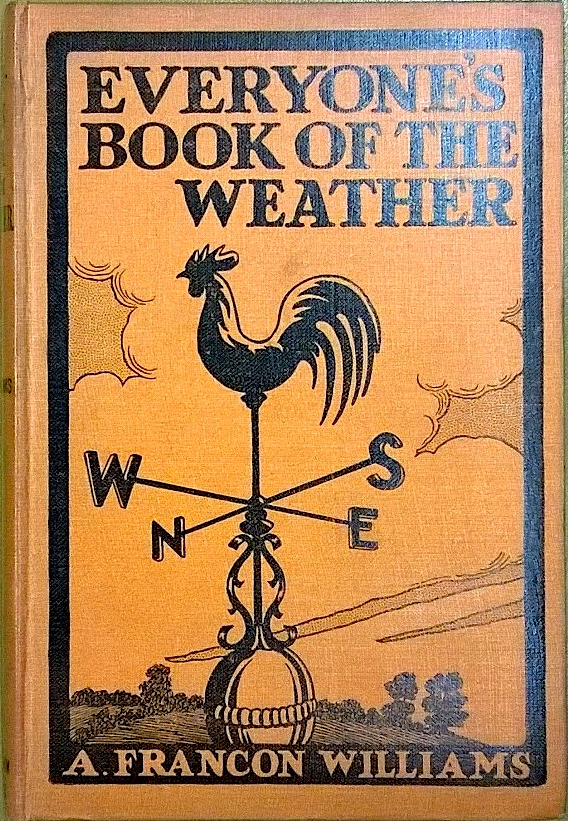
Everyone's Book of the Weather, 1923

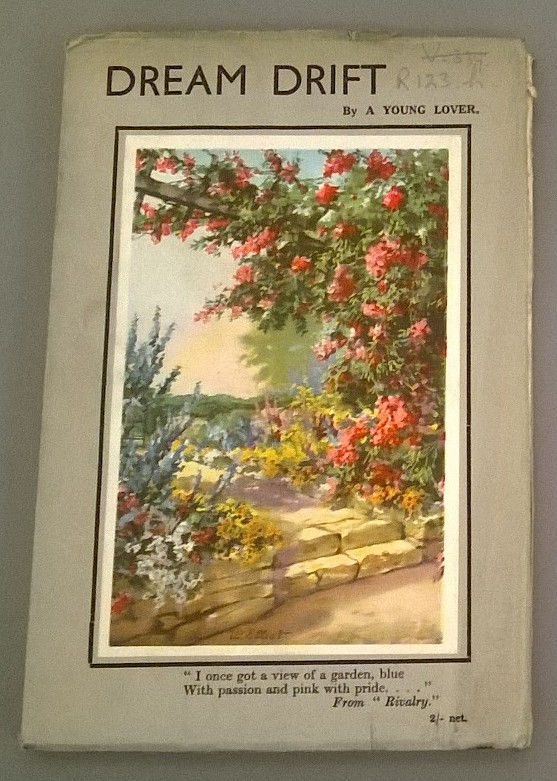
Dream Drift (book of poetry), 1938

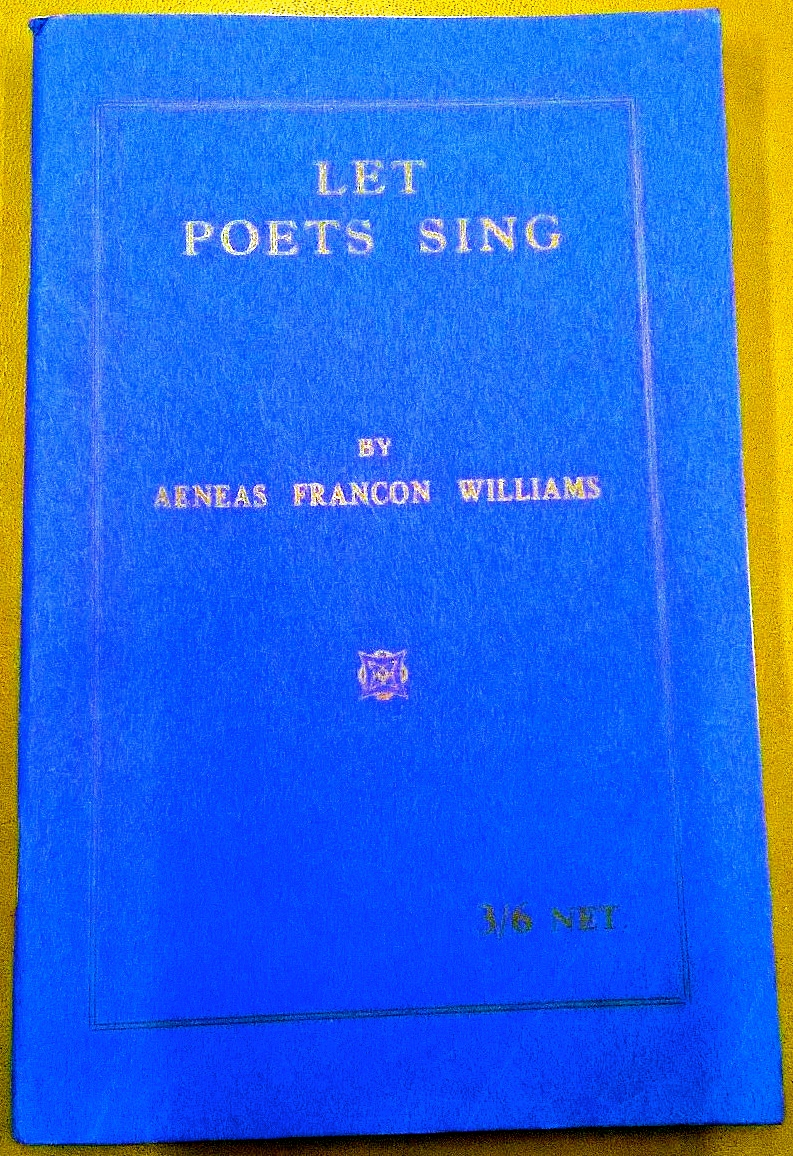
Let Poets Sing, 1961

- The Kaisar-i-Hind Medal, public award, was awarded to Clara Anne Williams (Mrs. Francon Williams), in 1946 by the Viceroy of India Louis Mountbatten for her distinguished service in the advancement of the interests of the British Raj.

== Published works ==
- A Pronouncement of the Public Conscience. Calcutta: Thacker, Spink and Co. 1921. OCLC 500207057.
- Everyone's Book of the Weather. The Sheldon press; The Macmillan Co. 1923. OCLC 3856011.
- Surveying for Everyone. The Sheldon press; The Macmillan Co. 1925. OCLC 4835735.
- Four Little Dears. India (Mech Mission Pamphlet): Church of Scotland. 1930.
- Hymn Book in Jalpaiguri Mech. Calcutta: Thacker, Spink and Co. 1930.
- Primer of the Mech Language Jalpaiguri. Calcutta: Macmillan & Co. 1931.
- A Mech Hymn Book. Calcutta: publ. in Calcutta. 1932.
- A Mech Catechism. Calcutta: publ. in Calcutta. 1933.
- Primer for Schools in Jalpaiguri. Calcutta: publ. in Calcutta. 1934.
- Dream Drift: A Selection of Poetry by a Young Lover. London: Stockwell. 1938. OCLC 315301004.
- Eastern Himalaya. Edinburgh: Church of ScotlandPublications. 1945.
- Report 1947: The Work of the Church of Scotland Mission in Bengal During A Momentous Year (1947). Edinburgh: Church of Scotland. 1947. Pamphlet BV3280.B4.Chu.
- A Companion In Meditation (with a foreword by The Very Rev, Charles Laing Warr, KCVO DD LLD, Dean of the Thistle and Dean of the Chapel Royal, Minister of St. Giles Cathedral. Edinburgh: Edinburgh. 1950. OCLC 315301001.
- Dictionary Of National Biography 1941-1950 (biography of Dr. John Anderson Graham p.312-313). Oxford: Oxford University Press. 1959. OCLC 650382455.
- Let Poets Sing: Poetry in The Heart Makes Music in The Soul (with a Foreword by John Stuart Anderson FRS FAA). London: Stockwell. 1961. OCLC 30244747.
- Kalidasa and Shakespeare by A. Francon Williams, Poetry Review, 1943:
- "Poetry Doesn't Sell". The Poetry Review (34). New York: Poetry Society of America: 137–138. 1943. OCLC 10033900. In response to Lowy, A.E. (1943). "Poetry Doesn't Sell". The Poetry Review (34). New York: Poetry Society of America: 64. OCLC 10033900.

== Unpublished works ==
- Tasmanian Apples by A. Francon Williams, 1960, with a preface by Tasmania's Agent General in London Hon. A.J. White. (In 1961, Williams submitted the manuscript to the publishing house Macmillan and Co., St. Martin's Street, London WC2.)
- Kiwiland by A. Francon Williams, 1961, with a preface by Sir Compton Mackenzie. (In 1961, Williams submitted the manuscript to the publishing house Macmillan and Co., St. Martin's Street, London WC2). The work includes an extract from The Road to the Isles, (the famous Scottish traditional song), which Sir Compton Mackenzie helped Aeneas get permission to use within the book.

== Film ==
The Lollipop Tree; Dr Graham's Homes, Kalimpong, documentary film, director Anthony Mayer, narrator Cliff Richard, release 24 January 1971. A documentary film about the history of Dr Graham's Homes. The film contains photographs of Aeneas teaching at the Homes in the early 1920s.

== Archives ==
- The University of Texas, Austin - Harry Ransom Humanities Research Center – Compton Mackenzie archive: index Compton Mackenzie: An Inventory of his Papers at the Harry. Incl. correspondence from Aeneas Francon Williams: ref. Williams, Aeneas Francon, 1886 - 154.5.
- Aeneas Francon Williams Family Collection

== See also ==
- List of University of Edinburgh people
