= Kunzang Lhamu =

Bhutanese women rights activist and civil servant

Kunzang Lhamu is a Bhutanese women rights activist and government official.

Lhamu was the former Member Secretary and Director of the National Commission of Women and Children. She obtained a Master in Public Policy from the Lee Kuan Yew School of Public Policy under National University of Singapore. She studied in Dr. Graham's Homes and University of Delhi. She currently works as the Director General at Department of Employment and Entrepreneurship, Ministry of Industry, Commerce and Employment.
