= John Anderson Graham =

Scottish minister and missionary

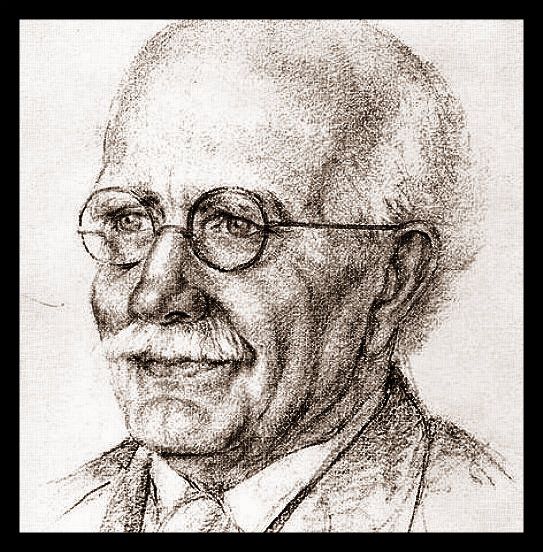
John Anderson Graham

John Anderson Graham CIE (8 September 1861 – 15 May 1942) was a Scottish minister and the first missionary from Young Men's Guild sent to North Eastern Himalayan region Kalimpong—then in British Sikkim (Colonial British name), currently in West Bengal.

He was the founder of the Dr. Graham's Homes, Orphanage-cum-School for destitute Anglo-Indian children at Kalimpong, in the Eastern Himalayas on the borders of Tibet, Sikkim, Bhutan, and India. He was the recipient of several British and Bhutanese honorary degrees.

He served as Moderator of the General Assembly of the Church of Scotland in 1931.

== Biography ==
Graham was born in a religious family on 8 September 1861 at De Beauvoir, West Hackney district, London, to the Scottish father from Dunbartonshire David Graham, a customs officer, and the Irish mother Bridget Nolan, a homemaker. He attended local Parish school, and was withdrawn from the school at the age of thirteen to work in order to support the family as his father had died in 1867.

With minimum and interrupted schooling, he started working as a clerk in a role of licking stamps and delivering messages. With an appetite to continue further studies, he attended evening classes at The Andersonian where he studied stenography and astronomy. In 1875, he enrolled himself in a school at Glasgow.

At the age of sixteen, he worked as a minor civil servant (clerk) to the General Board of Lunacy, Edinburgh. During this period, he became engaged in Church affairs as a member of St. Bernard's Parish Church, and also became the secretary of the Young Men's Fellowship Association. From University of Edinburgh, he studied ministry in 1885. While studying at the university, he became the secretary to the committee producing Life and Work, a Church periodical, and also learnt here the importance and power of propaganda and dissemination of information. In 1886, he initiated the Church of Scotland Yearbook, and went to Dresden, Germany, for a brief period of study.

With British Empire colonialism expanding globally and reaping financial benefits many missionary committees and ministers, doctors and nurses received the call to serve in faraway places that also included a duty to free the natives from the superstitions and fears of the religions that they had feared for centuries. Accordingly, he became the national secretary for the "Young Men's Guild," and was ordained as the first missionary supported by the same guild on 13 January 1889. After two days of ordination, he married Katherine McConachie, who later bore him two sons and four daughters, and was sent as a missionary to Kalimpong, part of then-British Sikkim—till the 18th century, it had been part of Sikkim, then became part of Bhutan, and at present part of West Bengal from the 19th century.

Graham and his wife arrived Calcutta on 21 March 1889 travelling via Switzerland, Austria, and Italy. From Calcutta, they moved to Darjeeling, and then to Kalimpong—then populated with three main tribes Lepchas, Nepalese, and Bhutias - Graham was more attracted later to work with original inhabitants of the area, Lepcha people.

== Missionary work ==
"Kalimpong mission" was founded by prior visits of missionaries like "McLeod" and "Watson", where mission compound had sixteen acres of land, close to the Kalimpong bazaar. It also housed "Guild mission" and a training school for catechists; later, with growing diseases, a hospital with 25 beds was opened in 1893.

In 1890, he became the convenor of the Silk Committee, and encouraged local farmers to improve farming techniques. In 1891, he established the Kalimpong Mela, an agriculture fair, to instill competition and encourage competition among farmers. He also took part in establishing a Cooperative Credit Society in Kalimpong to safeguard the locals from threats of moneylenders.

In 1889, Katherine Graham started a girls' school, later renamed as Kalimpong Academy, to educate girls. She also played a considerable role in social and economic upliftment of Nepalese and Lepcha women; she engaged the local women in crafts and cottage industries, having sensed the demand for those in East India Company army and Tea planters. Katherine started Lace school, Weaving school, and encouraged them to take up poultry rearing and turkey breeding. Katherine was also awarded with Kaisar-i-Hind Medal in 1916, for her contributions in developing Cottage industries. She died on 15 May 1919.

In 1895, he went back to Scotland with his wife for three years. During that period, he visited Young Men's Guild network and published mission books On the Threshold of Three Closed Lands and The Missionary Expansion of the Reformed Churches describing the mission, the tribes, and the country side.

As a missionary, he was responsible for the growth of Christian churches, hospitals, and economic development activities by raising funds from Scotland. In 1931, he worked as a moderator of General Assembly for the Church of Scotland. He was also awarded a house in Kalimpong for his contributions on his fiftieth anniversary of missionary service in 1939, where he lived his retired life till his death in 1942 at Kalimpong.

=== Kalimpong homes ===
Upon returning to India in 1898, he diverted his attention to offspring of unofficial unions with locals and children of the planters -- Anglo-Indian community, also known as Eurasians - the children not born out of marriage - usually, had no identification with their country of birth.. For this, he initiated St. Andrew's Colonial and Industrial Settlement project to provide these illicit and abandoned children with Christian homes, education, and the opportunity to immigrate to rewarding work. He turned to British Raj government of India and Scottish public for the funds as neither guild network nor missionary committee came forward to fund the project.

In 1900, he founded St Andrew's Colonial Home, later renamed to Dr. Graham's Homes, at Kalimpong, on behalf of the needy, orphaned, deprived, neglected, and abandoned Anglo-Indian children—the unwanted byproducts of mixed and illicit, through Indian and British relationships. Having sensed the calamity suffered by the early Anglo-Indian families, where the Anglo-Indian was ostracised and considered as an "outsider" to the local Indians, he founded this institute in the Tea Gardens of Darjeeling district with its own farm, bakery, dairy, poultry, hospital, and clothing department. Graham started the Home with one rented cottage and six children in the care of a housemother and a teacher, initially. John and Katherine Graham started this to relieve the plight of underprivileged children of Anglo-Indian descent and numerous destitutes from the streets of Calcutta(present Kolkata) and the tea plantations of Darjeeling, Dooars, and Terai. After Indian independence from Colonial British Raj, it also started accepting students from neighbouring countries as well.

In 1905, he and his wife were entrusted with Mary Scott who was the daughter of Lord and Lady Polwarth. She had an ambition to be a missionary.

In 1908, Graham was assisted in his work at Kalimpong by James Purdie, a welfare worker in Glasgow prison, later happened to be an important player in managing the finances efficiently and building up the necessary reserves ensuring constant flow of funds for homes. They together were responsible in constructing Birkmyre hostel at Calcutta for the Kalimpong boys who arrived Calcutta in search of jobs. The hostel was gifted by Archibald Birkmyre for the boys of Kalimpong homes.

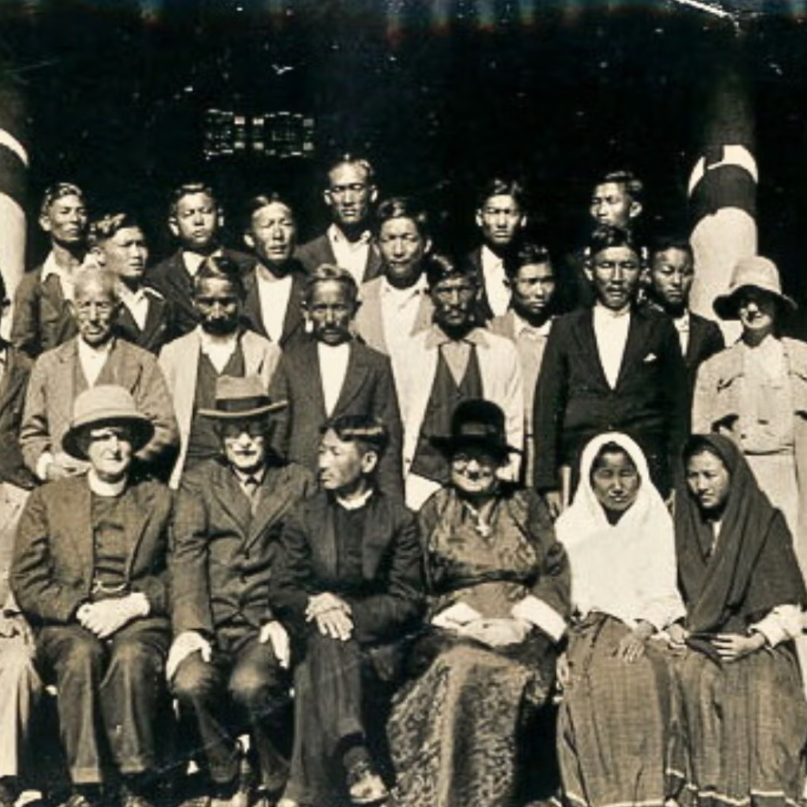
Outside Sikkim Church - bottom row: Mary Scott third from right and Graham is second from left

In 1910, the Church of Scotland missionary Aeneas Francon Williams arrived in Kalimpong to assist Graham at St Andrew's Colonial Home, firstly as the assistant schoolmaster and teacher of Geography and Science, and later as the Bursar. In 1914, Aeneas married Clara Anne Rendall, who was also a Church of Scotland missionary and a teacher at St Andrew's Colonial Home. Aeneas Francon Williams wrote the biography of John Anderson Graham that is included in the Dictionary of National Biography 1941-1950 published in 1959 by Oxford University Press.

Graham's mission work later spread to Madras(present Chennai). In 1911, he visited Madras and spoke about his work in the Kalimpong home influencing many, including Arthur Lawley, then-Governor of Madras. St. George's Homes in Kodaikanal constructed later had the same purpose as that of Kalimpong home, much influenced and modeled by Graham's work in Kalimpong.

This institute was providing education to more than 1200 boys and girls, located at 500-acre estate, on the slopes of Deolo Hills (in 2012?). Its students are Eurasian, Anglo-Indian, ethnic Negalese people, students from neighbouring lands of Tibet and Bhutan. The school compound also houses the Graham's grave.

=== Criticism ===
The rapid expansion of Kalimpong homes had become a matter of concern for the Foreign Missionary committees due to budget constraints. He had to face resentment from Nepali Christians and Lepcha Christians for shifting his focus and attention from them to the Anglo-Indian communities.

Graham and his other missionaries were also criticised by Lepcha Christian communities, who felt that they had been educated for only vocational pursuits and not for business, trade or commerce.

== Bibliography ==
- Stray Thoughts on the Possibility of a Universal Religion and the Feasibility of Teaching It in Our Schools, by John Anderson Graham, publ. 1887,
- On the Threshold of Three Closed Lands by John Anderson Graham, publ. 1897
- The Missionary Expansion of the Reformed Churches, by John Anderson Graham, publ. 1898.

== Awards ==
- Kaisar-i-Hind Medal, public award, awarded to him by government in 1903.
- Moderator's chair of the General Assembly of the Church of Scotland in 1931.
- Silver jubilee medal.

== See also ==
- Dr. Graham's Homes#Dr. John Anderson Graham
- St. George's Homes
- John Anderson Graham (1861-1942), Dictionary of National Biography: by Aeneas Francon Williams.
