= Norman Douglas Hutchinson =

British painter

Norman Douglas Hutchinson (11 October 1932 – 24 June 2010) was a British Royal painter. He was noted for his 1988 painting of Queen Elizabeth II.

== Life ==
Hutchinson was born in Calcutta, India on 11 October 1932. He was the illegitimate child of Hon. Eric Douglas – a Scottish nobleman – and his 15-year-old Anglo-Indian servant Florence. However, despite (or perhaps because of) his noble parentage, he was given to an orphanage, Dr. Graham's Homes in Kalimpong at the age of four months. He later discovered his parentage while going through the files at the Home. He eventually met his mother, when she was a widow living in poverty in Calcutta. He never met his father.

Lady Mountbatten, a patron of the orphanage, made note of the young Hutchinson's artistic talent. A portrait of Lady Mountbatten was commissioned, as was a portrait of the orphanage founder Dr. Graham. These early paintings sealed his artistic fate and future: both paintings still survive.

The young Hutchinson met and fell in love with Gloria Mudaliar, of Russian and Indian heritage (whose parents had owned a circus!). They married in 1955 and moved to London in 1959, with her sister and their two young children. He eventually started an engineering company which became very successful, though he continued his paintings on the side, with Gloria his most frequent subject. His portrait commissions continued to come in, albeit irregularly; it was his painting of the Queen Mother, wearing the famous Koh-i-Noor diamond from India, that brought him fame, and, to a certain extent, fortune.

The family bought two farmhouses in the south of France, with an extensive garden, which they renovated in Indian style. In 1988, they revisited India for the first time and made capital contributions toward a new dormitory at the orphanage where Hutchinson grew up. They eventually moved to Morocco.

As a painter, Hutchinson's works include portraits of Nehru, Prince Philip, Elizabeth and the Queen Mother.

Hutchinson died on the evening of 24 June 2010 at his home in Marrakesh, Morocco. His wife still lives in Dar el Mudal today, and rents out rooms to visitors.
