= Matelli railway station =

Railway station in West Bengal, India

Matelli Railway Station

General information
- Location: Matelli, Dist - Jalpaiguri State: West Bengal; India
- Coordinates: 26.9361°N 88.8095°E
- Elevation: 178 metres (584 ft)
- System: Indian Railways Station
- Owner: Indian Railways
- Operator: Northeast Frontier Railway zone
- Line: Chalsa Matelli line
- Platforms: 1
- Tracks: 2(undergoing Gauge conversion)

Construction
- Structure type: At grade
- Parking: Available

Other information
- Status: Undergoing Gauge conversion from narrow/meter gauge to broad gauge
- Station code: MATD
- Zone(s): Northeast Frontier Railway zone
- Division(s): Alipurduar
Location
- Location within West Bengal Location within India

Matelli Railway Station serves the town of Matialihat in Doars region of Jalpaiguri district of the Indian state of West Bengal. The station lies under Northeast Frontier Railway's, Alipurduar railway division. This railway station lies on Chalsa - Matelli railway line which is currently undergoing Gauge conversion from meter/narrow gauge to broad gauge and Matelli - Naxal line is currently under construction. The currently functioning nearest railway station is Chalsa railway station 8 kilometres away.
