= Mary Scott (missionary) =

Mary Harriet Hepburne-Scott
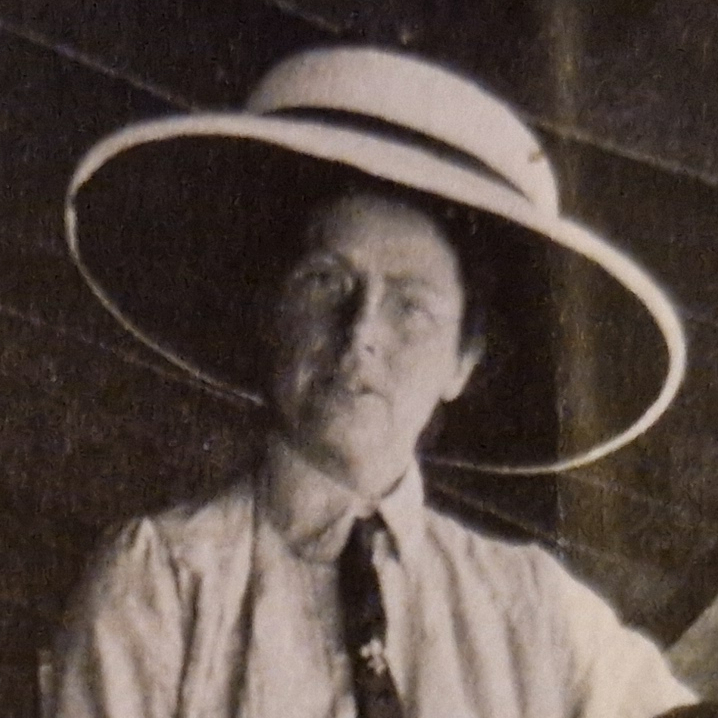
- Born: 1887
- Died: 1964
- Known for: Medical service and Girls' Education
- Scientific career
- Fields: Medical Missionary
- Workplaces: Sikkim

Mary Harriet Hepburn-Scott (1887 – 1964) was a Scottish missionary and educator who pioneered women's education in Sikkim. Despite her lack of formal medical training, she became the leading medical, educational and religious missionary in Gangtok, educating an entire generation of Sikkimese physicians and significantly improving health outcomes, despite Christian missionaries historically not being allowed in Gangtok for political and religious reasons. Scott also founded Gangtok's first girls school, the Paljor Namgyal Girls' School, which still exists today and has been credited with greatly improving the overall state of women's education in Sikkim both historically and currently. Additionally, Scott has been recognized for almost-single-handedly creating the largest period of growth in Christianity in Sikkim, which still significantly impacts Sikkim's religious demographics.

== Early life and Kalimpong ==
Mary Scott was born in 1877 to Walter Hepburne-Scott, 8th Lord Polwarth and his wife. Little is known of her aristocratic upbringing, other than that she received no formal medical education. She had an ambition to be a missionary and in 1905 her parents agreed that she could leave in the care of the established missionaries Katherine and John Anderson Graham.

In 1905, she travelled to Kalimpong to work as a Christian missionary with the Church of Scotland mission. Despite her lack of formal medical education, she was one of the first women to win the Kaisar-i-Hind Medal for her work during the Spanish flu epidemic of 1918–1919. She was also awarded an honorary degree in theology from a Scottish university for her relative success in converting the Lepcha people of Sikkim to Christianity despite the failure of numerous earlier attempts at conversion. Despite her lack of medical training, she acquired a reputation for good works and reliability, and for serving the general population of Sikkim as well as its Christian population. Scott was also considered a highly competent administrator, and proved highly adept at navigating Gangtok's politics despite the heavy suspicion she attracted due to her religion, aristocratic background and gender. Despite receiving substantial state support and repeatedly being offered a salary, Scott refused any personal payment and supported herself by selling paintings she made in her spare time. Scott also acquired a reputation for humility, refusing to write letters to Scotland because she feared it would make herself appear less part of the community, especially in light of her aristocratic background and her status as a religious missionary. After retiring as the official missionary of Sikkim in 1939, she. returned to Kalimpong and founded a school for the blind in 1940, which bears her name. In the 1990s, the Mary Scott School for the Blind in Kalimpong revolutionized blind education in Southeast India by being the first to introduce Brail technology. The school is still in existence with over 60 students as of 2014, and has entered into a partnership with the salvation army to expand.

== PNG School ==
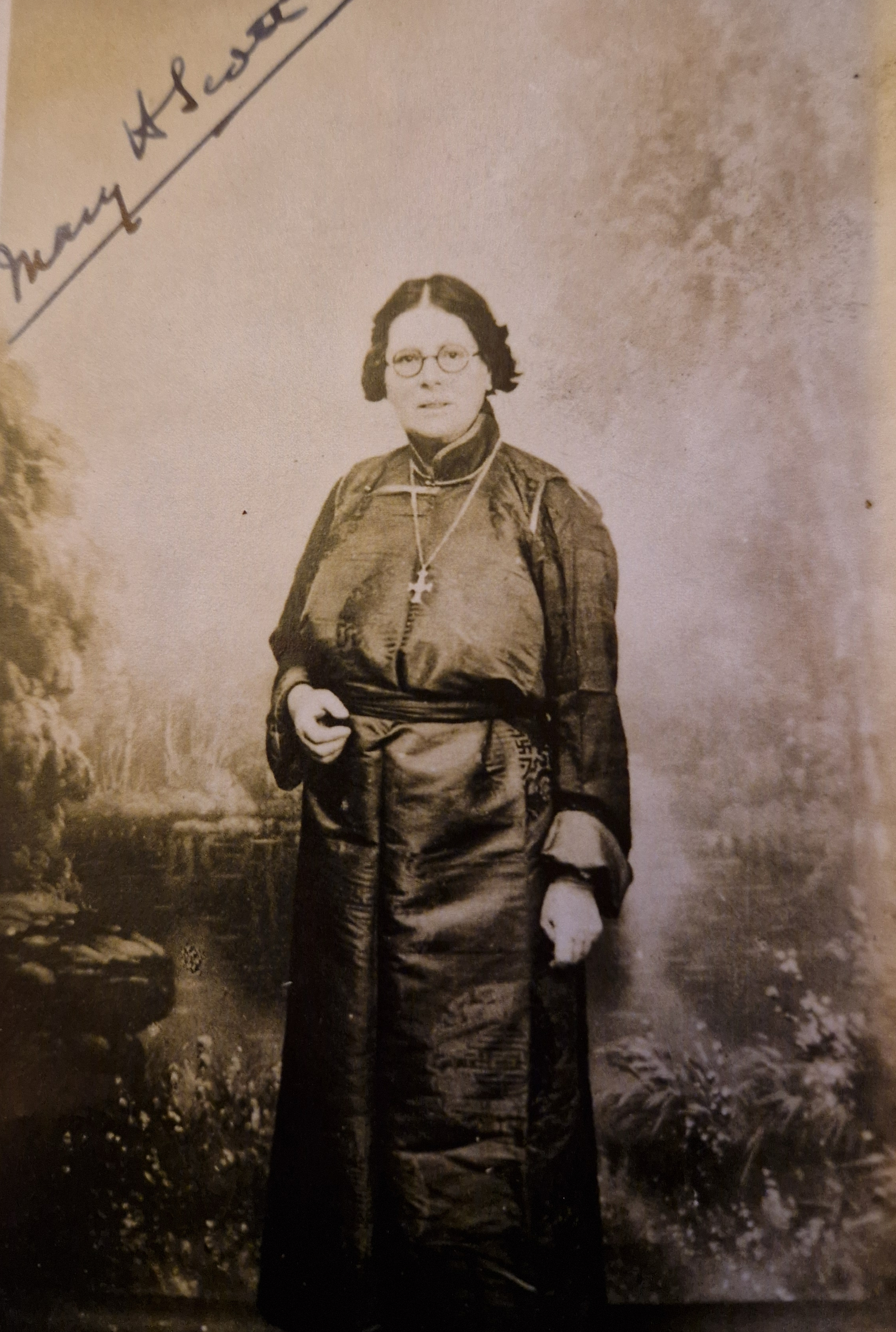
Scott in a bakhu

In 1923 Scott succeeded the previous missionary of Sikkim Reverend Maclean, and moved to the Sikkimese capital of Gangtok. This marked a major concession by the raj of Sikkim, because previously Christian missionaries had been forbidden from living in Gangtok. Explanations given for the special privilege given to Scott include her aristocratic background, her prior reputation and aid in the epidemic, and her strong relations with the Sikkimese elite, which largely arose from her reputation for efficient work and tolerating Buddhist customs when fighting epidemics. She established Paljor Namgyal Girls School (PNG School) in 1924. The school began with just two pupils who Scott recruited by asking door-to-door. With assistance from the Sikkim State government and the Catholic church she gradually grew the school into a fully fledged secondary school that was recognized by University of Calcutta in 1945 and formally accredited by the government of India in 1961. The PNG was known for focusing on practical skills that would help Sikkim develop rather than learning-for-learning's sake, and eventually established a complete special program in knitting despite a near complete lack of familiarity when she arrived. While initially founded as the first Gangtok school for girls the PNG school eventually accepted boys as well. Due to difficulty acquiring staff, Scott convinced the local government to fund sending graduates of the school elsewhere for education, after which they would return to Gangtok as teachers.

== Medical missionary ==
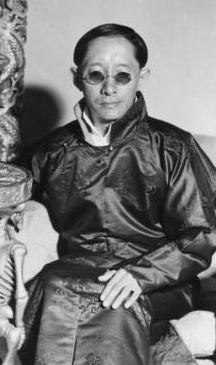
Tashi Namgyal, the ruler or Chogyal of Sikkim, who allowed Scott to relocate to Sikkim and strongly supported her medical-missionary activities.

From her earlier days in Gangtok, Scott used her position in Gangtok to begin a successful medical mission. While Gangtok had little medical infrastructure and the prior missionary of Sikkim Reverend Maclean had not given any attention to medical work, he had recommended that his successor be a medical missionary. Despite her lack of formal medical training, Scott devoted much of her efforts to medical efforts, at times caring for the sick inside her own home during the Visceral leishmaniasis epidemics. From the beginning, Scott ensured that the medical mission was primarily run by Sikkimese workers, which was unusual for medical Missions at the time, and helped accelerate the creation of a class of Western trained doctors and pharmacists in Sikim. While none of Scott's students moved beyond compounder status before Scott left in 1939 due to health issues from the altitude, several of her later students would go on to become allopathic medical professionals after her departure, with many of the students receiving substantial financial support from the state government due to Scott's prior actions convincing the Sikkimese elite of the value of medical education Her creation of a class of Western-trained doctors is considered a major reason medicine in Sikkim was not significantly affected by the Partition of India, and Sikkim's success at converting a medical system based on foreign support into a fully functioning indigenous one has been cited as a positive example compared to other regions of modern-day India. Some of her students continued as doctors in Sikkim as late as 1995.

== Christian missionary ==
Scott balanced her educational and medical goals with her role as a Scottish religious missionary. In her medical work in Kalimpong, Scott was tolerant of non-Christians working and receiving education, and she saw value in the Buddhist teachings of hard work and responsibility that aligned with her Presbyterian belief's. The success of Scott's efforts led to her receiving permission to open a Christian church in Gangtok in 1936, a strong testament to her reputation given the strong opposition to Christian activities by the Chogyal and other political elites in Sikkim. Scott's reputation as a friend to the population of Sikkim rather than just the small but growing Christian minority is considered a major reason for the privileges she was given. Scott's successor as Scottish Mission in Gangtok, the Reverend Gavin Fairservice, continued her efforts, but he was not allowed to reside in Sikkim and his evangelizing was monitored by the local government. The Presbyterian Missionary Church Scott founded is still in existence today, and the Presbyterian Missionary Church remains the largest Christian denomination in Sikkim. The majority are descendants of those converted by Scott and others in the late nineteenth and early 20th centuries. Her efforts established Christians as a significant minority in Sikkim today.
