= Walter Hepburne-Scott, 8th Lord Polwarth =

Scottish peer (1838–1920)

Walter Hugh Hepburne-Scott, 8th Lord Polwarth (1838–1920), was a Scottish peer who served as a Scottish representative peer in the House of Lords and as the Lord Lieutenant of Selkirkshire.

== Biography ==
Hepburne-Scott was born on Friday 30 November 1838.

He succeeded to the title of Lord Polwarth upon his father's death in 1867. He was a Scottish representative peer from 1882 to 1900, which allowed him to sit in the House of Lords of the UK Parliament. He was the Lord Lieutenant of Selkirkshire, the monarch's official representative in the county, from 1878 until his death in 1920. The family's main residence during his time was Marchmont House, near Polwarth, though the family seat is now Harden House.

Hepburne-Scott died on Tuesday 13 July 1920.

== Private life ==
He had a daughter, Mary, who was a leading missionary in Sikkim in India.

== Lord Lieutenant of Selkirkshire ==
This was a county-level, non-political, honorary position in which he served as the monarch's personal representative. Historically, the primary function of the Lord Lieutenant was military: to organize local militia units, raise volunteer forces, and ensure the county's defence in times of invasion or civil unrest. While this responsibility was significantly diminished by the 19th century and formally ended in 1921, the Lord Lieutenant maintained strong links with local armed forces, including reserve and cadet forces.

Arranging and escorting members of the Royal Family during visits to Selkirkshire. Representing the monarch at local civic, voluntary, and social events. Presenting medals, honours, and awards on behalf of the Crown. Encouraging and promoting local voluntary and charitable organizations. The Lord Lieutenant was historically closely associated with the magistracy and was a member of the police committee and local authority until the late 19th century reforms. "Eyes and Ears" of the Crown: He was expected to keep the monarch's Private Office informed about local issues relevant to the county.
