= John Breeden =

Rev. John Breeden (9 May 1872 –1942) was an English Wesleyan Methodist Missionary Society missionary in the Madras Presidency. He was an educationalist and the founder of St George's Homes, an orphanage-cum-school for abandoned and deprived children of Eurasians or Anglo-Indians in Kodaikanal, later renamed as The Laidlaw Memorial School, Ketti in the Nilgiris.

== Biography ==
Breeden was born on 9 May 1872 to Fredrick Breeden and Jane Breeden at St. Saviour in Surrey, England. He spent his adolescence with his family at Newington, London and finished his primary education at St John's, Inner London. Having been influenced by the teachings of John Wesley, founder of Methodist Movement, from his early life, he joined Handsworth College, Birmingham and studied for ordination as a Wesleyan Methodist Minister. While studying at Handsworth College, he met James Cooling, who was on sabbatical leave from Madras and was a speaker on the Methodist Circuit; James remained as a mentor of Breeden till his death in Madras in 1915.

In 1888, he entered the ministry and learnt the Tamil language in London under the guidance of missionaries who had served in India. Having volunteered for service as a missionary in Madras Presidency with Wesleyan Methodist Missionary Society (WMMS), he sailed to India on 30 September 1898. Upon arrival in Madras, he served as a minister in the Wesley Church at Black Town, also known as George Town, Chennai where he preached the sermon The Unpardonable Sin. In 1899, he worked as probationer with the Foreign Missions, active with recording and officiating at Births, Deaths and Marriages at Wesleyan Methodist Church in Perambur. In 1901, he married Frances Cox and served in Madras in the English colonies of the WMMS, referred to as the Madras English circuit, between 1898 and 1911. During this time, he was involved in raising money to build a new church at Egmore called the Egmore Church, the present Wesley Church, Chennai; for this, he visited the homes of European and Eurasian families (or Anglo-Indian), British Raj government servants, and visitors to Madras-both Christian and non-Christians alike. Egmore Church was formally inaugurated on 11 February 1905 by James Cooling, his mentor; Breeden was appointed as its first minister by Cooling.

During his furlough in England, he served as missionary lecturer at Richmond Theological College in 1907. After he returned from England to Madras, Breeden devoted most of his time to the cause of education of orphans of European, Eurasians, or Anglo-Indians origin, between 1911 and 1915 as his ministry was the English circuit in Madras, which meant that his flock were the families of British Raj soldiers, civil servants, and Eurasian population; during this time, he founded St. George's Homes an Orphanage, initially at Kodaikanal and later moved to Ketti in Nilgiris—St. George's Homes was subsequently named as Laidlaw Memorial School

He returned to England in 1921 due to ill-health after missionary service of twenty-three years. In 1937, he published He Suffered There, an ecumenical book. During World War II, he continued to work from St. Stephens House in Westminster which was used to provide relief for those displaced by the bombing of London. At the age of 70, he died in the district of Meriden in the West Midlands, United Kingdom.

== St. George's Homes ==
Being a minister in the English circuit of the Wesleyan Mission in Madras, he was more associated and observant of the ostracised and neglected members of the Anglo-Indian community — during those times, European schools in colonial British Raj catered to pure and mixed-race Europeans who retained "European habits or modes of life". Anglo-Indians were not accepted in better schools, and indigenous Indians were entirely prohibited — British parents often objected to their children rubbing shoulders with mixed-race students; accordingly, he made their education and accommodation as the central-point of his missionary work in Madras. In 1910, J. Breeden first thought of establishing a home for orphans and destitute children of the Anglo-Indian community, also known as Eurasians — unwanted children of illicit and mixed relationships born out of wedlock — these offspring were of unofficial unions of Europeans (mostly English, Americans and Europeans) on the payroll of the British East India Company like soldiers and civil servants with Asians or local Indians — these children, usually had no identification with their country of birth — A study conducted in 1879 found that except pure European descent, most of the Anglo-Indians in Bengal, especially Anglo-Indians living in the slums of Calcutta and Madras received no formal education.

In October 1910, he addressed the Madras Missionary Conference where he made his first appeal for the establishment of St. George's Homes evincing the plight of poor and deprived children. In the conference, he proposed the neglected Eurasians be given an opportunity to emerge from a tangled growth with their European and Indian origins overcoming the neglect and prejudice from both British Raj government policy and European population. He advocated for the support following the model of St. Andrew's Colonial Homes(later renamed to Dr. Graham's Homes), an Orphanage-cum-School, established at Kalimpong by John Anderson Graham, a Scottish missionary. He put forth before the committee that the Anglo-Indian community cannot sustain purely on alms alone, but pleaded for government support too; consequently, a committee was constituted with Breedon as its secretary and his mentor James Cooling as its chairman — James Cooling at that time was the chairman of WMMS Madras district and also the Principal of "Wesley High School" in Royapettah. His thoughts on the subject were published in Harvest Field later in November 1910. As the WMMS role was to oversee only missionary problems and spread fellowship among the various societies, the body stated that it had no power to initiate new work when the committee's resolution was submitted to WMMS; consequently, the missionary conference decided to form a separate organization to work for the realization of its resolution. Hence, St. George's Homes society formed in 1910, had in fact became the foundation of the establishment of the Homes with sincere efforts from John Breeden. For the first committee, then Governor of Madras Arthur Lawley consented to be the President of the Homes with a promise to grant 1000 acres of land in Kodaikanal.

In 1911, John Anderson Graham visited Madras and spoke about his work in Kalimpong homes influencing many, including Arthur Lawley, the then Governor of Madras and also the President of the committee. St. George's Homes to be constructed later in Kodaikanal had the same purpose as that of the Kalimpong homes. The committee at its first meeting decided to establish an institution for European and Eurasian orphans in Kodaikanal on the lines of Dr. Graham's Homes in Kalimpong. During this meeting, it was decided to send John Breeden to work in Great Britain soliciting funds for "European and Eurasian Education Fund" to raise necessary funds for St. George's Homes. As part of collecting funds for St. George's Homes and other educational institutions for Anglo-Indians, "European and Eurasian Education Fund" was formed with its own National Council, in January 1911. The aim of this is to send a delegation to England and solicit the funds on name of orphans.

In April 1911, a delegation of the All India Central Committee led by W.H. Arden-Wood, Principal of La Martiniere, Calcutta and a Fellow of Calcutta University, representing all the Christian communities of the British Raj except Roman Catholics went to England to portray the plight of domiciled Anglo-Indian communities with respect to their education and collect funds. John Breeden was one among the five delegates who visited England.

In May 1911, as part of fundraising efforts through donations for "European and Eurasian Education Fund" with Breeden as its Organising secretary, they published their appeals in major journals like The Times (in London). Breeden, who was prominent in advocacy for the collection of funds wrote an appeal in The Child, a monthly journal devoted to Child

welfare, in October 1912 as:

the domiciled British and Anglo-Indian community in India — numbering 250,000 to 300,000 — has been steadily declining in the social scale. In some of the cities of India 50 percent of these people are living below the pauper line. Lord Lansdowne says that this condition of affairs is a national reproach, which ought to have been removed years ago; Lord Roberts describes the problem as 'one of the most painful in any part of the Empire.' The question of adult pauperism in India is too big a problem to come within the scope of the present movement. But all authorities on India agree that the best solution is to be founding concentrating on the children of school-going age.....
....there are 44,000 Anglo-Indian children and about 10,000 of these children are receiving no education whatsoever… we are asking for justice not charity for these neglected little ones…..if these children were in Great Britain their birthright would ensure compulsory and free education.' Rev Breeden then adds clarification in his appeal writing that....
....missionary societies cannot, without a breach of trust, use money for Europeans when it has been donated for evangelization of non-Christian peoples. Hence the need for this special fund… and donations can be sent to Sir Capel Wolseley, Bart, 55 Market Street (Room 7), Manchester'.....

The fund raising delegation and the All Indian Central Committee in which John Breeden was a member, was recognized by Buckingham Palace and the work of fund raising efforts continued till December 1913. In 1913, Breeden along with Capel Wolseley established Lancashire Committee to solicit funds in the mid counties of the United Kingdom. Breeden finally reverted to Madras in 1913 and started his preparation for the establishment of St. George's Homes. Breeden succeeded in raising nearly 7,000 British pounds for initial buildings for the Homes. By February 1914, 10,000 British pounds was raised.

St. George's Homes was registered under Act XXI of 1860 in February 1914. British Raj government reserved 600 acres of land for the Homes in Pulney Hills, Kodaikanal. John Sinclair, then-Governor of Madras, as the first President of the St. George's Homes turned the first sod on the site for Homes on 17[18] February 1914. Homes first Vice-president was bishop of Madras, and John Breeden was appointed as its first Secretary and the Principal of St. George's Homes. Harold Stuart, a Civil servant, was elected as the first chairman of the board of Homes. In May 1914, first two orphan children were admitted in a rented cottage triggering the start of the activities of the new school for Homes. In November 1914, additional cottages were rented out for accommodation of girls and babies. On 25 November 1914, first school teacher from England joined the Homes. In its first year of inception, the school grew to twenty-one boys and twelve girls, including seven babies. In 1922, St. George's Homes was moved from Kodaikanal to Ketti of Nilgiris district in Tamil Nadu, after John Breeden left to England in 1921 due to ill-health that forced him to retire.

=== Criticism ===
G. F. Paddison, then-Collector of Madras, speaking on the occasion of first year of St. George's Homes described John Breeden as a "great beggar." He also said, as reported in Madras Mail on 8 June 1915:

...we have had experience with such 'beggars' in the past, and we have come to recognise that their secret of success has in all cases been the same — an unbound faith in the cause they espouse. Unwearying patience, unquenchable importunity, and a gift for advertising that would put a Yankee patent medicine 'drummer' to shame.

He compared the work of John Breeden on behalf of St. George's Homes and the "European Education Fund" as qualifying him to be recognized as "the best beggar in the Madras Presidency." Adding further, he also said "... Mendicancy of this nature is a holy gift applied to holy cause ... will see St Georges Homes expand and succeed ..."

== See also ==
- Kalimpong homes
- The Laidlaw Memorial School and Junior College, Ketti
- Wesleyan Methodist Church (Great Britain)
- Wesleyanism
- Methodist Church of Great Britain
