= Matialihat =

- Census Town
- Location in West Bengal, India Matialihat (India)
- Coordinates: 26.947159°N 88.812305°E
- Country: India
- State: West Bengal
- District: Jalpaiguri

Area
  - Total: 0.3118 km^{2} (0.1204 sq mi)

Population (2011)
  - Total: 4,215
  - Density: 13,520/km^{2} (35,010/sq mi)
- Time zone: UTC+5:30 (IST)
- PIN: 735223
- Telephone/STD code: 03562
- Vehicle registration: WB
- Lok Sabha constituency: Alipurduars
- Vidhan Sabha constituency: Nagrakata
- Website: jalpaiguri.gov.in

Matialihat (also known as Matelli) is a census town in the Matiali CD block in the Malbazar subdivision of the Jalpaiguri district in the state of West Bengal, India.

== Geography ==
Places and tea estates in Malbabazar subdivision (including Mal, Nagrakata and Matiali CD blocks) in Jalpaiguri district
CT: census town, R: rural/ urban centre, N: neighbourhood, NP: national park/ wildlife sanctuary, TE: tea estate
Abbreviations used in names – TG for Tea Garden (town/village), TE for Tea Estate, JRS: junction railway station
Owing to space constraints in the small map, the actual locations in a larger map may vary slightly

=== Area overview ===
Gorumara National Park has overtaken traditionally popular Jaldapara National Park in footfall and Malbazar has emerged as one of the most important towns in the Dooars. Malbazar subdivision is presented in the map alongside. It is a predominantly rural area with 88.62% of the population living in rural areas and 11.32% living in the urban areas. Tea gardens in the Dooars and Terai regions produce 226 million kg or over a quarter of India's total tea crop. Some tea gardens were identified in the 2011 census as census towns or villages. Such places are marked in the map as CT (census town) or R (rural/ urban centre). Specific tea estate pages are marked TE.

Note: The map alongside presents some of the notable locations in the subdivision. All places marked in the map are linked in the larger full screen map.

== Demographics ==
As per the 2011 Census of India, Matialihat had a total population of 4,215. There were 2,200 (52%) males and 2,015 (48%) females. There were 398 persons in the age range of 0 to 6 years. The total number of literate people in Matialihat was 3,253 (85.22% of the population over 6 years).

== Infrastructure ==
According to the District Census Handbook 2011, Jalpaiguri, Matialihat covered an area of 0.3118 km^{2}. Among the civic amenities, it had 20 km roads with open drains, the protected water supply involved overhead tank, tap water from treated sources, hand pumps. It had 766 domestic electric connections, 125 road lighting points. Among the medical facilities it had one dispensary/ health centre, five medicine shops. Among the educational facilities it had five primary schools, one middle school, one secondary school, the nearest senior secondary school at Chaloa 8 km away. Among the social, cultural and recreational facilities, it had one public library, one reading room. An important commodity it produced was tea. It had branches of one cooperative bank, and two non-agricultural credit societies.

== Schools ==
There are two higher secondary schools and one junior girls school:

- Matelli High School (Bengali medium higher secondary school)
- Rastrabhasha High School (Hindi medium higher secondary school)
- Junior Girls School

There are two primary schools:

- Matelli Special Board Free Primary School
- Aamtala Free Primary School
- Samsing Higher Secondary School - Nepali Medium (edited by - Robert Khawas)

== Surroundings ==
Matelli Bazar is surrounded by many tea gardens and is the main center for the people/workers of those gardens, people from those gardens majorly come to the bazaar on its popular Sunday market for the purchase of their daily needs. However, some people come daily as well.

== Transport ==
=== Railway ===
Matelli railway station serves the census town of Matelli, which is currently undergoing Gauge conversion from meter gauge to broad gauge.

Currently functioning nearest railway station is Chalsa railway station which is around 8 kilometres away from Matelli.

=== Roadway ===
The town has good roadway connection to the nearby cities. Buses/Jeeps services and taxis are available from Matelli to cities like Malbazar, Siliguri, Panitanki, Bagdogra, Birpara, Jaigaon etc.

=== Airport ===
The nearest airport from the city is Bagdogra International Airport around 85 kilometres away.

== Culture, festivals and celebrations ==
The majority of residents are Hindu, but other religions are also present. The place has been popular for its picnic spot, and during the new year, some Melas are set up during the Durga Puja which is a major festival of West Bengal.

- Nagaisuree TG Mela
- Ingdong TG Mela
