= Dr. Graham's Homes =

Location
- Kalimpong, West Bengal27.0841,88.4922, 734316; India
- Coordinates: 27.0841°N 88.4922°E

Information
- Former name: St. Andrew's Colonial Homes
- Type: Boarding and day school
- Motto: Thorough
- Established: 1900; 126 years ago
- Founder: John Anderson Graham
- President: Michael Shane Calvert
- Principal: Neil C Monteiro
- Gender: Co-educational
- Colours: Blue and White
- Website: www.drgrahamshomes.net

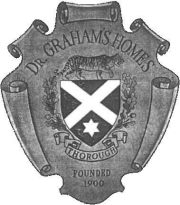
Emblem of Dr. Graham's Homes, 1900AD

Dr. Graham's Homes (formerly St. Andrew's Colonial Homes) was founded in 1900 by John Anderson Graham, a missionary of the Church of Scotland, who settled in Kalimpong and worked with the local community for several years during the turn of the 20th century. Whilst working in Edinburgh as a clerk in the civil service, Graham was influenced and encouraged by the minister of his church, John McMurtrie, to be ordained in the ministry.

== History ==
John Anderson Graham arrived in Kalimpong in 1889 as a representative of Young Men's Guild of Scotland to do missionary work in the small village of Kalimpong which had recently been annexed by the British from Bhutan after the Dooars War of 1864–1865. In only a few years after arriving in Kalimpong, Graham had turned into a social reformer who aimed to find a solution to what contemporary observers at that time called the "poor white problem" of British India. The "poor whites" were unacknowledged mixed race children of British fathers and native mothers. Shunned by the British and the upper class Indians most mixed-race children ended up on city streets. Newspapers, administrators and commentators portrayed this as an acute problem that threatened existing social and racial hierarchies. One solution took the form of St. Andrew's Colonial Homes in Kalimpong, where the pure air of the Himalayas would assist in schooling "poor white" children into a useful workforce.

Places in the Kalimpong Sadar subdivision in Kalimpong district
CT: census town, R: rural/ urban centre, M: municipality, F: facility, NP: national park
Abbreviations used in names – TG for Tea Garden (town/village)
Owing to space constraints in the small map, the actual locations in a larger map may vary slightly

On 24 September 1900 Graham opened St. Andrew's Colonial Homes on land leased from the Government of Bengal below Deolo hill in a rented cottage with 6 children. He would soon lease 100 acres and then, over the years, a total of 400 acres as the Homes continued to grow. The Homes were established as a vocational training school where abandoned children of British army personnel, administrators and tea planters would be taught a vocation and shipped to British colonies such as New Zealand, Australia and Canada where they could establish themselves with the job skills learned in Kalimpong.

In 1901 the first cottage was opened: Woodburn Cottage, named after the Lieutenant Governor of Bengal. Subsequent cottages thereafter were named after key benefactors – including Elliot Cottage opened 1902; Campbell Cottage named after J. A. Campbell, a member of parliament; Strachan Cottage was inaugurated in 1904 by Sir Robert Laidlaw of Whiteway, Laidlaw & Co., who had extensive interests in tea and rubber, and who, on his death, left money to the Homes.

By 1906 there were 187 children at the Homes. By the 1920s the Homes complex was a self-sufficient village housing 600 children, which featured a hospital, gymnasium and a farm. In the first twenty years, Graham constructed 44 buildings, averaging a shade over two buildings a year. In the day-to-day running of the Homes, he was helped by two long-serving members of staff: headmaster, James Simpson and administrator, James Purdie. Graham's wife Katherine died in 1919, and it was after this thathe revived his dream of building a chapel on the compound. This was completed in 1925 and dedicated as the Katherine Graham Memorial Chapel on 24 September, the Homes' Silver Jubilee birthday. Graham completed his last building, the kindergarten, in 1938. The following year was his personal jubilee year (1889–1939) and well-wishers worldwide contributed to the building of a new principal's house on the compound. Jubilee House still commemorates him. Graham died on 15 May 1942 and is buried on the Homes compound in the Garden of Remembrance alongside his wife Katherine.

St. Andrew's Colonial Homes became Dr. Graham's Homes in 1947, to honour the founder.

== Notable alumni ==
- Norman Douglas Hutchinson, British Royal painter
- Lyonchen Jigmi Yoser Thinley, Prime Minister of Bhutan between 2008 and 2013
- Tshering Tobgay, Prime Minister of Bhutan from 2013 to 2018
- Sonam Tobgye, Chief Justice of Bhutan Supreme Court & High Court
- Padma Shri David R. Syiemlieh, Indian academic and the former chairman of the Union Public Service Commission of India
- Anirban Bhattacharyya, Indian author, television producer and director and actor
- Binod Pradhan, Bollywood cinematographer
- Henry Raymond Edmunds MBE, superintendent of agriculture for Darjeeling and deputy director of agriculture for Bengal

== Gallery ==
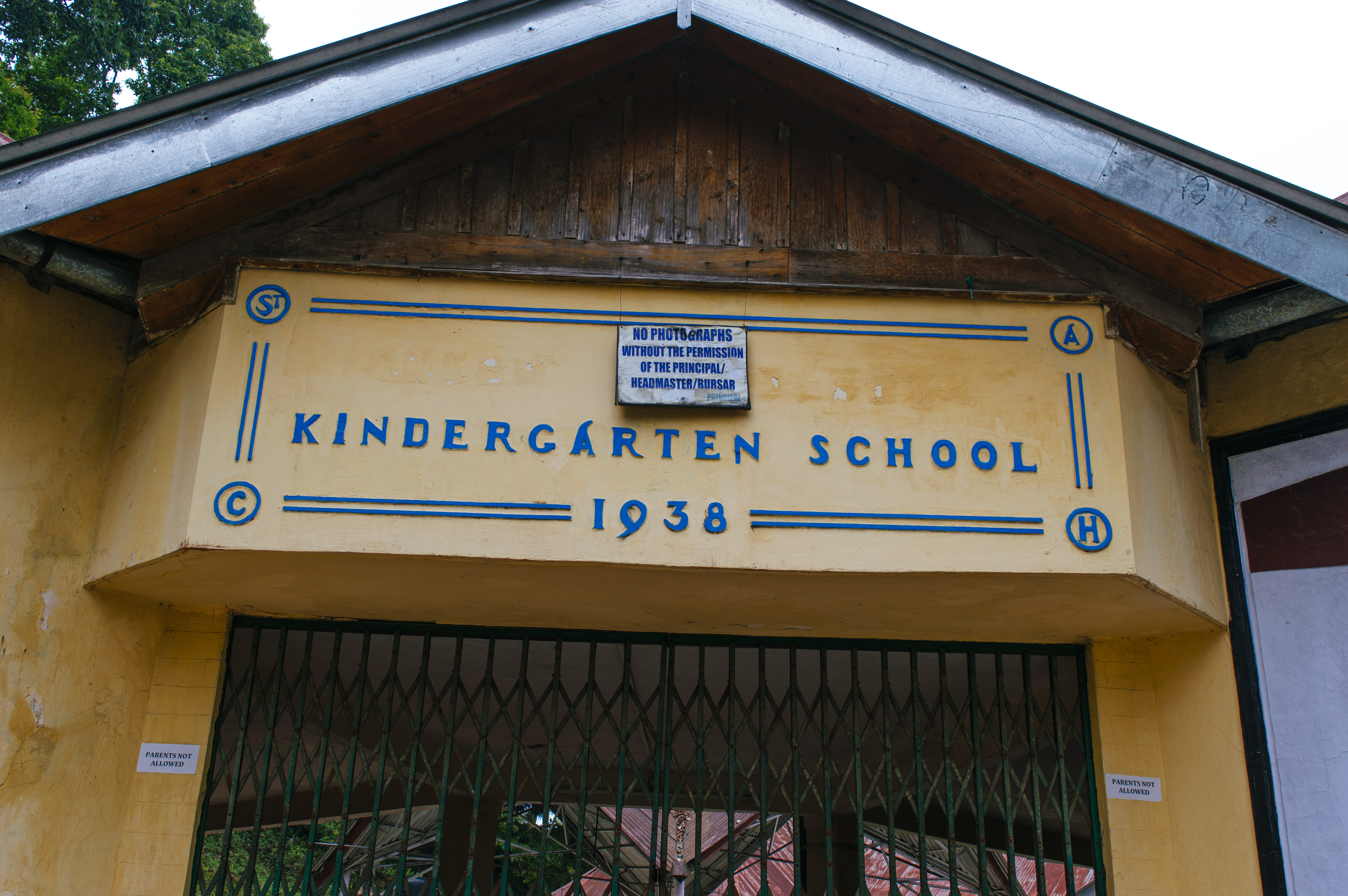

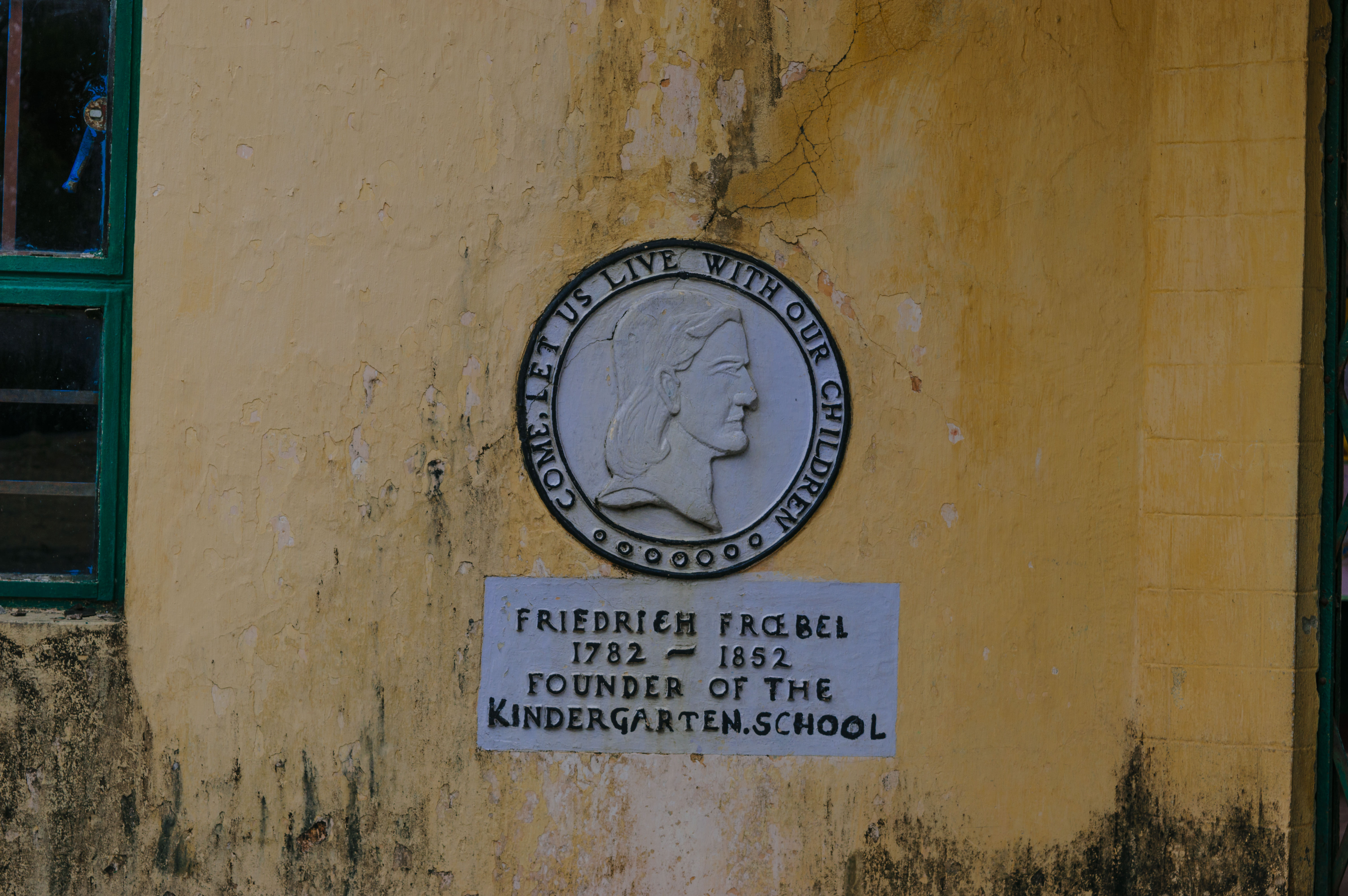

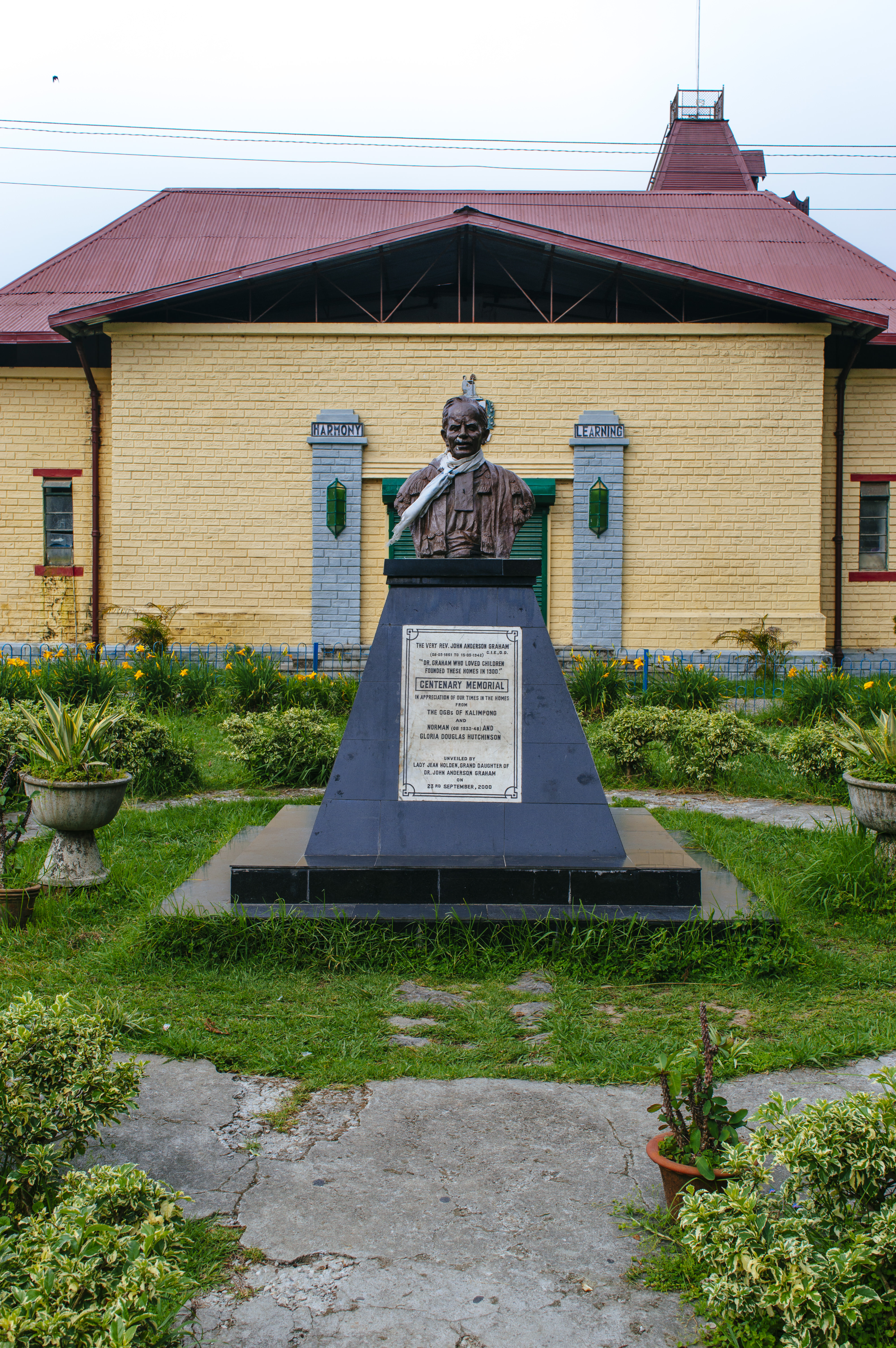

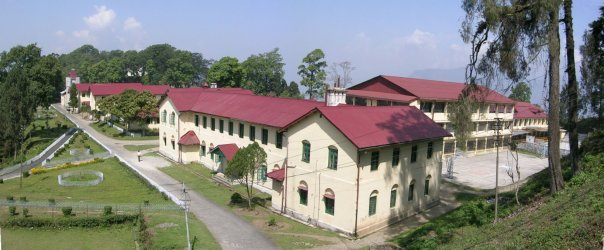

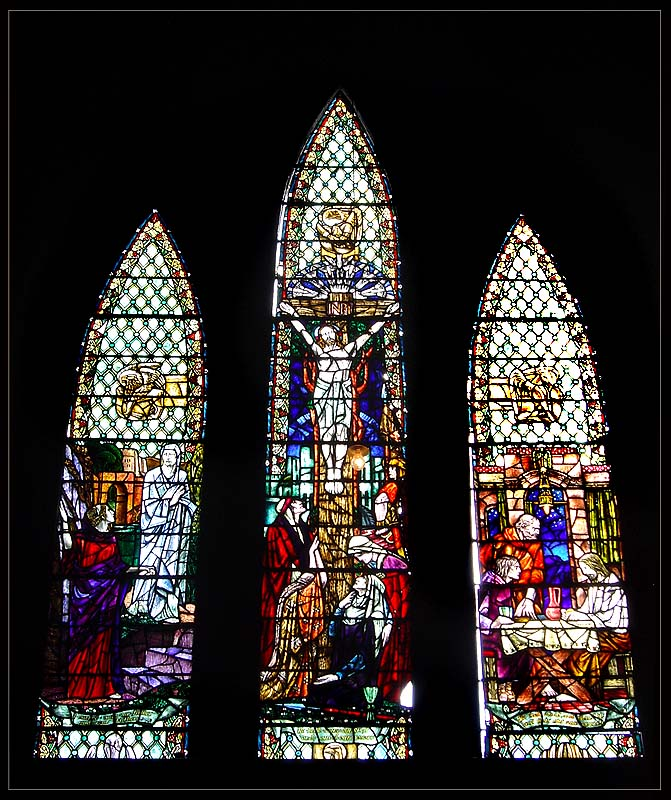

== See also ==
- St. George's Homes
