= Jalpaiguri (community development block) =

- Community development block
- Coordinates: 26.516667°N 88.733333°E
- Country: India
- State: West Bengal
- District: Jalpaiguri

Area
  - Total: 500.65 km^{2} (193.30 sq mi)

Population (2011)
  - Total: 323,455
  - Density: 646.07/km^{2} (1,673.3/sq mi)

Languages
  - Official: Bengali, English
- Time zone: UTC+5:30 (IST)
- Lok Sabha constituency: Jalpaiguri
- Vidhan Sabha constituency: Jalpaiguri, Rajganj
- Website: jalpaiguri.gov.in

Jalpaiguri is a community development block (CD block) that forms an administrative division in the Jalpaiguri Sadar subdivision of the Jalpaiguri district in the Indian state of West Bengal.

== Geography ==
Jalpaiguri is located at 26°31′00″N 88°44′00″E.

The Jalpaiguri CD block lies in the southern part of the district. The Teesta River flows along its northern and eastern boundary. It lies on a gently sloping alluvial plain locally called Terai.

The Jalpaiguri CD block is bounded by the Kranti CD block on the north, Maynaguri CD block on the east, Panchagarh Sadar Upazila of Panchagarh District in Rangpur Division in Bangladesh on the south, and Rajganj CD block on the west.

The Jalpaiguri CD block has an area of 500.65 km^{2}. It has 1 panchayat samity, 14 gram panchayats, 227 gram sansads (village councils), 29 mouzas, 28 inhabited villages and 1 census town. Jalpaiguri police station serves this block. Headquarters of this CD block is at Jalpaiguri.

Gram panchayats of Jalpaiguri block/ panchayat samiti are: Jalpaiguri block consists of 14 gram panchayats, viz. Kharia, Arabinda, Paharpur, Mondalghat, Bahadur, Patkata, Belakoba, Barapatina Nutanabos, Garalbari, Nagar Berubari, South Berubari, Kharija–Barubari–I, Kharija–Barubari–II and Boalmari–Nandanpur.

== Demographics ==
=== Population ===
According to the 2011 Census of India, the Jalpaiguri CD block had a total population of 323,455, of which 261,784 were rural, and 61,661 were urban. There were 166,036 (51%) males and 157,401 (49%) females. There were 38,992 persons in the age range of 0 to 6 years. The Scheduled Castes numbered 196,592 (60.78%) and the Scheduled Tribes numbered 19,592 (6.06%).

According to the 2001 census, Jalpaiguri block had a total population of 280,446, out of which 144,974 were males and 135,472 were females. Jalpaiguri block registered a population growth of 7.29 per cent during the 1991-2001 decade.

Census town in the Jalpaiguri CD block are (2011 census figures in brackets): Kharia (P) (61,661) .

Large villages (with 4,000+ population) in the Jalpaiguri CD block are (2011 census figures in brackets): Barapatina Nutanbus (16,366), Bhelakoba (17,215), Satkhamar (12,391), Bahadur (18,878), Patkata (43,360), Paharpur (20,341), Mandalghat (16,083), Garalbari (28,791), Binnaguri (4,370), Berubari (41,593), Nandanpur (6,114), Kharija Berubari (10,076) and Boalmari (6,310).

Other villages in the Jalpaiguri CD block include (2011 census figures in brackets): Berubarinagar (762).

=== Literacy ===
According to the 2011 census, the total number of literate persons in the Jalpaiguri CD block was 209,966 (73.81% of the population over 6 years) out of which males numbered 117,661 (80.52% of the male population over 6 years) and females numbered 92,305 (66.73% of the female population over 6 years). The gender disparity (the difference between female and male literacy rates) was 13.78%.

See also – List of West Bengal districts ranked by literacy rate

Literacy in CD blocks of
Jalpaiguri district
Jalpaiguri Sadar subdivision
Rajganj – 62.82%
Jalpaiguri – 73.81%
Maynaguri – 75.63%
Dhupguri – 60.57%
Malbazar subdivision
Mal – 66.31
Matiali – 66.98%
Nagrakata – 61.27%
Alipurduar subdivision
Madarihat-Birpara – 67.77%
Kalchini – 68.96%
Kumargram – 72.42%
Alipurduar I – 78.19%
Alipurduar II – 75.76%
Falakata – 72.64%
2011 Census: CD Block Wise

Primary Census Abstract Data

=== Language and religion ===
Religion in Jalpaiguri CD block (2011)
Hinduism	83.21%
Islam	15.00%
Christianity	1.67%
Other or not stated	0.12%

In the 2011 Census of India, Hindus numbered 269,150 and formed 83.21% of the population of Jalpaiguri CD block. Muslims numbered 48,521 and formed 15.00% of the population. Christians numbered 5,411 and formed 1.67% of the population. Others numbered 363 and formed 0.11% of the population. Others include Addi Bassi, Marang Boro, Santal, Saranath, Sari Dharma, Sarna, Alchchi, Bidin, Sant, Saevdharm, Seran, Saran, Sarin, Kheria, and other religious communities.

Languages of Jalpaiguri CD block (2011)
1. Bengali (85.8%)
2. Sadri (4.67%)
3. 'Other' Bengali (3.09%)
4. Rajbongshi (2.27%)
5. Hindi (1.66%)
6. Others (2.48%)

At the time of the 2011 census, 85.83% of the population spoke Bengali, 4.67% Sadri, 2.27% Rajbongshi and 1.66% Hindi as their first language. 3.09% were recorded as speaking 'Other' under Bengali.

== Poverty level ==
Based on a study of the per capita consumption in rural and urban areas, using central sample data of NSS 55th Round 1999-2000, Jalpaiguri district was found to have relatively high rates of poverty of 35.73% in rural areas and 61.53% in the urban areas. It was one of the few districts where urban poverty rate was higher than the rural poverty rate.

According to a World Bank report, as of 2012, 26-31% of the population of Jalpaiguri, Bankura and Paschim Medinipur districts were below poverty line, a relatively high level of poverty in West Bengal, which had an average 20% of the population below poverty line.

== Economy ==
=== Livelihood ===
Livelihood
in Jalpaiguri CD block
1. Cultivators (20.4%)
2. Agricultural labourers (34.1%)
3. Household industries (1.04%)
4. Other Workers (44.4%)

In the Jalpaiguri CD block in 2011, among the class of total workers, cultivators numbered 27,859 and formed 20.42%, agricultural labourers numbered 46,547 and formed 34.11%, household industry workers numbered 1,417 and formed 1.04% and other workers numbered 60,631 and formed 44.43%. Total workers numbered 136,454 and formed 42.19% of the total population, and non-workers numbered 186,991 and formed 57.81% of the population.

Note: In the census records a person is considered a cultivator, if the person is engaged in cultivation/ supervision of land owned by self/government/institution. When a person who works on another person's land for wages in cash or kind or share, is regarded as an agricultural labourer. Household industry is defined as an industry conducted by one or more members of the family within the household or village, and one that does not qualify for registration as a factory under the Factories Act. Other workers are persons engaged in some economic activity other than cultivators, agricultural labourers and household workers. It includes factory, mining, plantation, transport and office workers, those engaged in business and commerce, teachers, entertainment artistes and so on.

=== Infrastructure ===
There are 28 inhabited villages in the Jalpaiguri CD block, as per the District Census Handbook, Jalpaiguri, 2011. 100% villages have power supply. 100% villages have drinking water supply. 19 villages (67.86%) have post offices. 27 villages (97.43%) have telephones (including landlines, public call offices and mobile phones). 20 villages (71.43%) have pucca (paved) approach roads and 17 villages (60.71%) have transport communication (includes bus service, rail facility and navigable waterways). 5 villages (17.86%) have agricultural credit societies and 7 villages (25.00%) have banks.

=== Agriculture ===
The economy of the Jalpaiguri district is mainly dependent on agriculture and plantations, and majority of the people are engaged in agriculture. Jalpaiguri is well-known for tea and timber. Other important crops are paddy, jute, tobacco, mustard seeds, sugarcane and wheat. The annual average rainfall is 3,440 mm, around double of that of Kolkata and the surrounding areas. The area is flood prone and the rivers often change course causing immense damage to crops and cultivated lands.

In 2013-14, there were 171 fertiliser depots, 79 seed stores and 71 fair price shops in the Jalpaiguri CD block.

In 2013–14, the Jalpaiguri CD block produced 90,197 tonnes of Aman paddy, the main winter crop, from 38,465 hectares, 5,094 tonnes of Boro paddy (spring crop) from 2,125 hectares, 2,221 tonnes of Aus paddy (summer crop) from 1,159 hectares, 2,794 tonnes of wheat from 1,626 hectares, 72 tonnes of maize from 34 hectares, 52,940 tonnes of jute from 5,608 hectares, 74,094 tonnes of potatoes from 3,605 hectares and 11,260 tonnes of sugarcane from 110 hectares. It also produced pulses and oilseeds.

In 2013-14, the total area irrigated in the Jalpaiguri CD block was 20,263 hectares, out of which 12,975 hectares were irrigated by canal water, 278 hectares by tank water, 1,060 hectares by river lift irrigation, 500 hectares by deep tube wells and 5,450 hectares by shallow tube wells.

=== Dooars-Terai tea gardens ===
Tea gardens in the Dooars and Terai regions produce 226 million kg or over a quarter of India's total tea crop.. The Dooars-Terai tea is characterized by a bright, smooth and full-bodied liquor that's a wee bit lighter than Assam tea. Cultivation of tea in the Dooars was primarily pioneered and promoted by the British but there was significant contribution of Indian entrepreneurs.

=== Banking ===
In 2013-14, Jalpaiguri CD block had offices of 21 commercial banks and 6 gramin banks.

=== Backward Regions Grant Fund ===
The Jalpaiguri district is listed as a backward region and receives financial support from the Backward Regions Grant Fund. The fund, created by the Government of India, is designed to redress regional imbalances in development. As of 2012, 272 districts across the country were listed under this scheme. The list includes 11 districts of West Bengal.

== Transport ==
Jalpaiguri CD block has 4 ferry services, 8 originating/ terminating bus routes.

== Education ==
In 2013-14, Jalpaiguri CD block had 238 primary schools with 23,546 students, 6 middle schools with 1,510 students, 11 high schools with 7,799 students and 25 higher secondary schools with 31,156 students. Jalpaiguri CD block had 4 technical/ professional institutions with 2,647 students and 602 institutions for special and non-formal education with 36,849 students. Jalpaiguri municipal area (located outside the block) had 3 general degree colleges with 7001 students.

See also – Education in India

According to the 2011 census, in Jalpaiguri CD block, among the 28 inhabited villages, 2 villages did not have schools, 22 villages had two or more primary schools, 15 villages had at least 1 primary and 1 middle school and 12 villages had at least 1 middle and 1 secondary school.

== Healthcare ==
In 2014, Jalpaiguri CD block had 1 hospital, 1 rural hospital, 5 primary health centres and 3 NGO/ private nursing home with total 137 beds and 15 doctors (excluding private bodies). It had 48 family welfare subcentres. 4,254 patients were treated indoor and 158,864 patients were treated outdoor in the hospitals, health centres and subcentres of the CD block.

Belacoba Rural Hospital, with 30 beds at Prasannanagar, is the major government medical facility in the Jalpaiguri CD block. There are primary health centres at Bahadur (with 4 beds), Kharija Berubari (with 10 beds), Nadanpur Bolamari (PO Bolamari) (with 4 beds), Rangdhamali (with 10 beds), South Berubari (PO Manikganj) (with 4 beds).
