= Rajganj =

Rajganj may refer to:

- Rajganj, Jalpaiguri, a town/suburb of the Indian city of Jalpaiguri
  - Rajganj (community development block), an administrative division in Jalpaiguri district, West Bengal, India
  - Rajganj (Vidhan Sabha constituency), an assembly constituency in the Vidhan Sabha of West Bengal
- Rajganj, Dhanbad, a census town in Dhanbad district, Jharkhand

== See also ==
- Raiganj, a city in West Bengal, India
