= Dabgram =

- Census Town
- Location in West Bengal, India Dabgram (India) Dabgram (Asia)
- Coordinates: 26.712111°N 88.461611°E
- Country: India
- State: West Bengal
- District: Jalpaiguri

Area
  - Total: 24.06 km^{2} (9.29 sq mi)

Population (2011)
  - Total: 111,904
  - Density: 4,651/km^{2} (12,050/sq mi)
- Time zone: UTC+5:30 (IST)
- PIN: 734004
- Telephone/STD code: 03561
- Vehicle registration: WB
- Lok Sabha constituency: Jalpaiguri
- Vidhan Sabha constituency: Dabgram-Phulbari
- Website: jalpauguri.gov.in

Dabgram is a census town in the Rajganj CD block in the Jalpaiguri Sadar subdivision of the Jalpaiguri district in the state of West Bengal, India.

== Geography ==
Places and tea estates in Jalpaiguri Sadar subdivision (including Rajganj, Jalpaiguri, Maynaguri and Dhupguri CD blocks) in Jalpaiguri district
CT: census town, R: rural/ urban centre, N: neighbourhood, C: cantonment, NP: national park/ wildlife sanctuary, TE: tea estate
Abbreviations used in names – TG for Tea Garden (town/village), TE for Tea Estate, JRS: junction railway station
Owing to space constraints in the small map, the actual locations in a larger map may vary slightly

=== Location ===
Dabgram is located at 26.712111°N 88.461611°E

According to the map of the Rajganj CD block on page 115 in the District Census Handbook, Jalpaiguri, 2011 census, a part of Dabgram is shown as a part of Siliguri Municipal Corporation. However, a major part of Dabgram is shown outside Siliguri in Jalpaiguri district. Pradhan Nagar police station is shown in Dabgram. Dabgram, Binnaguri and Chakiabhita form a cluster of census towns on the eastern side of Siliguri.

=== Area overview ===
The map alongside shows the alluvial floodplains south of the outer foothills of the Himalayas. The area is mostly flat, except for low hills in the northern portions. It is a primarily rural area with 62.01% of the population living in rural areas and a moderate 37.99% living in the urban areas. Tea gardens in the Dooars and Terai regions produce 226 million kg or over a quarter of India's total tea crop. Some tea gardens were identified in the 2011 census as census towns or villages. Such places are marked in the map as CT (census town) or R (rural/ urban centre). Specific tea estate pages are marked TE.

Note: The map alongside presents some of the notable locations in the subdivision. All places marked in the map are linked in the larger full screen map.

== Civic administration ==
=== Police station ===
Pradhan Nagar police station has jurisdiction over a part of the Rajganj CD block and a part of Siliguri.

== Demographics ==
According to the 2011 Census of India, Dabgram (P) had a total population of 111,904 of which 61,078 (51%) were males and 57,962 (49%) were females. There were 15,093 persons in the age range of 0 to 6 years. The total number of literate people in Dabgram was 76,092 (73.20% of the population over 6 years).

== Infrastructure ==
According to the District Census Handbook 2011, Jalpaiguri, Dabgram covered an area of 24.06 km^{2}. Among the civic amenities, it had 53 km roads with open drains, the protected water supply involved service reservoir, tank, pond, lake. It had 14,075 domestic electric connections, 60 road lighting points. Among the medical facilities it had 1 dispensary/ health centre, 1 veterinary hospital, 21 medicine shops. Among the educational facilities it had 1 special school for disabled. Among the social, cultural and recreational facilities, it had 1 orphanage home. It had the branch of 1 cooperative bank, 1 agricultural credit society.

== See also ==
- Phulbari, Jalpaiguri
- Shaktigarh, Jalpaiguri
