= Uttar Putimari =

Village in West Bengal, India

- Village
- Location in West Bengal, India Uttar Putimari (India)
- Coordinates: 26.51°N 88.79°E
- Country: India
- State: West Bengal
- District: Jalpaiguri

Population (2011)
  - Total: 1,806

Languages
  - Official: Bengali, English
- Time zone: UTC+5:30 (IST)
- PIN: 735305
- Lok Sabha constituency: Jalpaiguri
- Vidhan Sabha constituency: Maynaguri

Uttar Putimari is a village located in Maynaguri CD block in the Jalpaiguri Sadar subdivision of the Jalpaiguri district in the state of West Bengal, India.
