= Binnaguri, Rajganj =

Binnaguri
- Census Town
- Location in West Bengal, India Binnaguri (India)
- Coordinates: 26.652111°N 88.468611°E
- Country: India
- State: West Bengal
- District: Jalpaiguri

Area
  - Total: 54.926 km^{2} (21.207 sq mi)

Population (2011)
  - Total: 58,840
  - Density: 1,071/km^{2} (2,775/sq mi)
- Time zone: UTC+5:30 (IST)
- PIN: 734004
- Telephone/STD code: 03561
- Vehicle registration: WB
- Lok Sabha constituency: Jalpaiguri
- Vidhan Sabha constituency: Dabgram-Phulbari
- Website: jalpaiguri.gov.in

Binnaguri is a census town and a gram panchayat in the Rajganj CD block in the Jalpaiguri Sadar subdivision of the Jalpaiguri district in the state of West Bengal, India.

== Geography ==
Places and tea estates in Jalpaiguri Sadar subdivision (including Rajganj, Jalpaiguri, Maynaguri and Dhupguri CD blocks) in Jalpaiguri district
CT: census town, R: rural/ urban centre, N: neighbourhood, C: cantonment, NP: national park/ wildlife sanctuary, TE: tea estate
Abbreviations used in names – TG for Tea Garden (town/village), TE for Tea Estate, JRS: junction railway station
Owing to space constraints in the small map, the actual locations in a larger map may vary slightly

=== Location ===
Binnaguri is located at 26.652111°N 88.468611°E.

According to the map of the Rajganj CD block on page 115 in the District Census Handbook, Jalpaiguri, 2011 census, Dabgram, Binnaguri and Chakiabhita form a cluster of census towns on the eastern side of Siliguri.

=== Area overview ===
The map alongside shows the alluvial floodplains south of the outer foothills of the Himalayas. The area is mostly flat, except for low hills in the northern portions. It is a primarily rural area with 62.01% of the population living in rural areas and a moderate 37.99% living in the urban areas. Tea gardens in the Dooars and Terai regions produce 226 million kg or over a quarter of India's total tea crop. Some tea gardens were identified in the 2011 census as census towns or villages. Such places are marked in the map as CT (census town) or R (rural/ urban centre). Specific tea estate pages are marked TE.

Note: The map alongside presents some of the notable locations in the subdivision. All places marked in the map are linked in the larger full screen map.

== Demographics ==
According to the 2011 Census of India, Binnaguri had a total population of 58,840 of which 30,258 (51%) were males and 28,582 (49%) were females. There were 8,172 persons in the age range of 0 to 6 years. The total number of literate people in Binnaguri was 34,129 (67.36% of the population over 6 years).

== Infrastructure ==
According to the District Census Handbook 2011, Jalpaiguri, Binnaguri covered an area of 54.926 km^{2}. Among the civic amenities, it had 33 km roads with open drains, the protected water supply involved river infiltration gallery, service reservoir, tap water from treated sources, uncovered well. It had 3,000 domestic electric connections, 210 road lighting points. Among the medical facilities it had 6 dispensary/ health centres, 1 veterinary hospital, 11 medicine shops. Among the educational facilities it had 21 primary schools, 5 middle schools, 7 secondary schools, 3 senior secondary schools, 2 special schools for disabled. Among the social, cultural and recreational facilities, it had 1 public library. Three important items it produced were tea, ply-wood and carrom board. It had branches of 2 nationalised banks.
