= Madhabdanga =

Village in West Bengal, India

- Village
- Location in West Bengal, India Madhabdanga (India)
- Coordinates: 26.54°N 88.80°E
- Country: India
- State: West Bengal
- District: Jalpaiguri

Government
  - Type: Gram panchayat

Population (2011)
  - Total: 1,423

Languages
  - Official: Bengali, English
- Time zone: UTC+5:30 (IST)
- PIN: 735224
- Lok Sabha constituency: Jalpaiguri
- Vidhan Sabha constituency: Maynaguri

Madhabdanga is a village located in Maynaguri CD block in the Jalpaiguri Sadar subdivision of the Jalpaiguri district in the state of West Bengal, India.
