= Chakiabhita =

- Census Town
- Location in West Bengal, India Chakiabhita (India)
- Coordinates: 26.652111°N 88.515611°E
- Country: India 26.652111,88.515611
- State: West Bengal
- District: Jalpaiguri

Area
  - Total: 3.8392 km^{2} (1.4823 sq mi)

Population (2011)
  - Total: 5,251
  - Density: 1,368/km^{2} (3,542/sq mi)
- Time zone: UTC+5:30 (IST)
- PIN: 734004
- Telephone/STD code: 03561
- Vehicle registration: WB
- Lok Sabha constituency: Jalpaiguri
- Vidhan Sabha constituency: Dabgram-Phulbari
- Website: jalpaiguri.gov.in

Chakiabhita is a census town in the Rajganj CD block in the Jalpaiguri Sadar subdivision of the Jalpaiguri district in the state of West Bengal, India.

== Geography ==
Places and tea estates in Jalpaiguri Sadar subdivision (including Rajganj, Jalpaiguri, Maynaguri and Dhupguri CD blocks) in Jalpaiguri district
CT: census town, R: rural/ urban centre, N: neighbourhood, C: cantonment, NP: national park/ wildlife sanctuary, TE: tea estate
Abbreviations used in names – TG for Tea Garden (town/village), TE for Tea Estate, JRS: junction railway station
Owing to space constraints in the small map, the actual locations in a larger map may vary slightly

=== Location ===
Chakiabhita is located at 26.652111°N 88.515611°E.

According to the map of the Rajganj CD block on page 115 in the District Census Handbook, Jalpaiguri, 2011 census, Dabgram, Binnaguri and Chakiabhita form a cluster of census towns on the eastern side of Siliguri.

=== Area overview ===
The map alongside shows the alluvial floodplains south of the outer foothills of the Himalayas. The area is mostly flat, except for low hills in the northern portions. It is a primarily rural area with 62.01% of the population living in rural areas and a moderate 37.99% living in the urban areas. Tea gardens in the Dooars and Terai regions produce 226 million kg or over a quarter of India's total tea crop. Some tea gardens were identified in the 2011 census as census towns or villages. Such places are marked in the map as CT (census town) or R (rural/ urban centre). Specific tea estate pages are marked TE.

Note: The map alongside presents some of the notable locations in the subdivision. All places marked in the map are linked in the larger full screen map.

== Demographics ==
According to the 2011 Census of India, Chakiabhita had a total population of 5,251 of which 2,720 (52%) were males and 2,531 (48%) were females. There were 568 persons in the age range of 0 to 6 years. The total number of literate people in Chakiabhita was 3,704 (79.09% of the population over 6 years).

== Infrastructure ==
According to the District Census Handbook 2011, Jalpaiguri, Chakiabhita covered an area of 3.8392 km^{2}. Among the civic amenities, it had 4 km roads with open drains, the protected water supply involved river infiltration gallery, service reservoir, covered well, uncovered well. It had 250 domestic electric connections, 35 road lighting points. Among the medical facilities it had 1 dispensary/ health centre, 4 medicine shops. Among the educational facilities it had 2 primary schools, 1 middle school, 1 secondary school, 1 senior secondary school, 22 non-formal education centres (Sarvya Siksha Abhiyan), 1 special school for disabled. Among the social, cultural and recreational facilities, it had 1 orphanage home, 3 auditorium/ community halls, 1 public library.
