= Ulladabri =

- Village
- Location in West Bengal, India Ulladabri (India)
- Coordinates: 26.54°N 88.78°E
- Country: India
- State: West Bengal
- District: Jalpaiguri
- Subdivision: Jalpaiguri Sadar
- Block: Maynaguri
- Gram panchayat: Barnesh

Government
  - Type: Gram panchayat

Population (2011)
  - Total: 5,722

Languages
  - Official: Bengali, English
- Time zone: UTC+5:30 (IST)
- PIN: 735224
- Lok Sabha constituency: Jalpaiguri
- Vidhan Sabha constituency: Maynaguri

Ulladabri is a village located in Maynaguri CD block in the Jalpaiguri Sadar subdivision of the Jalpaiguri district in the state of West Bengal, India.

== Geography ==
Ulladabri is situated on the eastern shore of Teesta River and western shore of Dharla River. The West Bengal State Highway 12A passes through the south of the village. It covers an area of 541.15 hectares. Mainaguri is nearest town to Ulladabri for all major economic activities, which is approximately 3 km away.

== Demographics ==
According to the 2011 Indian Census, Ulladabri has 1298 households. Among the 5722 inhabitants, out of which male population is 3,027 while female population is 2,695. Literacy rate of Ulladabri village is 64.09% out of which 70.70% males and 56.66% females are literate.

== Education ==
Government Pre Primary, Private Pre Primary, Govt Primary and Govt Secondary Schools are available in this Village.

== Healthcare ==
1 Primary Health Sub-Centre, 2 RMP doctors are available in this village.
