= Rajganj (community development block) =

- Community development block
- Coordinates: 26.556111°N 88.508611°E
- Country: India
- State: West Bengal
- District: Jalpaiguri

Area
  - Total: 614.82 km^{2} (237.38 sq mi)

Population (2011)
  - Total: 373,766
  - Density: 607.93/km^{2} (1,574.5/sq mi)

Languages
  - Official: Bengali, English
- Time zone: UTC+5:30 (IST)
- Lok Sabha constituency: Jalpaiguri
- Vidhan Sabha constituency: Rajganj, Dabgram-Phulbari
- Website: jalpaiguri.gov.in

Rajganj is a community development block that forms an administrative division in Jalpaiguri Sadar subdivision of Jalpaiguri district in the Indian state of West Bengal.

== Geography ==
Rajganj is located at 26°33′22″N 88°30′31″E.

The Rajganj CD block lies in the south-western part of the district. It is situated between the Mahananda River and the Teesta River. The northern portion is part of the central tract locally called Bhaber and the southern portion is a gently sloping alluvial plain locally called Terai.

The Rajganj CD block is bounded by the Mal CD block on the north, Jalpaiguri and Kranti CD block on the east, Panchagarh Sadar Upazila of Panchagarh District in Rangpur Division in Bangladesh on the south, Siliguri city, and Phansidewa, Matigara and Kurseong CD blocks in Darjeeling district on the west.

The Rajganj CD block has an area of 614.82 km^{2}. It has 1 panchayat samity, 12 gram panchayats, 220 gram sansads (village councils), 29 mouzas, 26 inhabited villages and 3 census towns. Rajganj and Pradhan Nagar police stations serve this block. Headquarters of this CD block is at Rajganj.

Gram panchayats of Rajganj block/ panchayat samiti are: Dabgram I, Dabgram–II, Fulbari I, Fulbari–II, Binnaguri, Sannyasikata, Majhiali, Panikauri, Sukhani, Kukurjan, Sikarpur, Mantadari and Junglee Mohal Forest Area.

== Demographics ==
=== Population ===
According to the 2011 Census of India, the Rajganj CD block had a total population of 373,766, of which 190,645 were rural, and 183,131 were urban. There were 193,185 (52%) males and 180,591 (48%) females. There were 48,038 persons in the age range of 0 to 6 years. The Scheduled Castes numbered 185,246 (49.56%) and the Scheduled Tribes numbered 15,386 (4.12%).

According to the 2001 census, Rajganj block had a total population of 287,615, out of which 150,481 were males and 137,134 were females. Rajganj block registered a population growth of -8.43 per cent during the 1991-2001 decade.

Census towns in the Rajganj CD block are (2011 census figures in brackets): Dabgram (119,040), Binnaguri (58,840) and Chakiabhita (5,251) .

Large villages (with 4,000+ population) in the Rajganj CD block are (2011 census figures in brackets): Simulguri (4,315), Mantadari (5,362), Kamarbhita (5,219), Shikarpur (9,969), Guzrimari (9,094), Chhat Guzrimari (8,127), Kismat Sukani (5,911), Pani Kauri (6,613), Sannyasikata (27,044), Sukani (35,276) and Kukurjan (11,995) .

Other villages in the Rajganj CD block include (2011 census figures in brackets): Ambari Falakata (3,105).

=== Literacy ===
According to the 2011 census, the total number of literate persons in the Rajganj CD block was 234,799 (62.82% of the population over 6 years) out of which males numbered 132,348 (78.52% of the male population over 6 years) and females numbered 102,451 (65.18% of the female population over 6 years). The gender disparity (the difference between female and male literacy rates) was 13.35%.

See also – List of West Bengal districts ranked by literacy rate

Literacy in CD blocks of
Jalpaiguri district
Jalpaiguri Sadar subdivision
Rajganj – 62.82%
Jalpaiguri – 73.81%
Maynaguri – 75.63%
Dhupguri – 60.57%
Malbazar subdivision
Mal – 66.31
Matiali – 66.98%
Nagrakata – 61.27%
Alipurduar subdivision
Madarihat-Birpara – 67.77%
Kalchini – 68.96%
Kumargram – 72.42%
Alipurduar I – 78.19%
Alipurduar II – 75.76%
Falakata – 72.64%
2011 Census: CD Block Wise

Primary Census Abstract Data

=== Language and religion ===
Religion in Rajganj CD block (2011)
Hinduism	79.17%
Islam	19.35%
Christianity	1.06%
Other or not stated	0.42%

In the 2011 Census of India, Hindus numbered 295,907 and formed 79.17% of the population of Rajganj CD block. Muslims numbered 72,333 and formed 19.35% of the population. Christians numbered 3,976 and formed 1.06% of the population. Others numbered 1,560 and formed 0.42% of the population. Others include Addi Bassi, Marang Boro, Santal, Saranath, Sari Dharma, Sarna, Alchchi, Bidin, Sant, Saevdharm, Seran, Saran, Sarin, Kheria, and other religious communities.

Languages of Rajganj CD block (2011)
1. Bengali (81.4%)
2. Hindi (5.09%)
3. 'Other' Bengali (3.77%)
4. Rajbongshi (2.98%)
5. Nepali (2.11%)
6. Sadri (1.70%)
7. Others (2.92%)

At the time of the 2011 census, 81.43% of the population spoke Bengali, 5.09% Hindi, 2.98% Rajbongshi, 2.11% Nepali and 1.70% Sadri as their first language. 3.77% were recorded as speaking 'Other' under Bengali.

== Poverty level ==
Based on a study of the per capita consumption in rural and urban areas, using central sample data of NSS 55th Round 1999-2000, Jalpaiguri district was found to have relatively high rates of poverty of 35.73% in rural areas and 61.53% in the urban areas. It was one of the few districts where urban poverty rate was higher than the rural poverty rate.

According to a World Bank report, as of 2012, 26-31% of the population of Jalpaiguri, Bankura and Paschim Medinipur districts were below poverty line, a relatively high level of poverty in West Bengal, which had an average 20% of the population below poverty line.

== Economy ==
=== Livelihood ===
Livelihood
in Rajganj CD block
1. Cultivators (10.6%)
2. Agricultural labourers (15.1%)
3. Household industries (3.31%)
4. Other Workers (71.0%)

In the Rajganj CD block in 2011, among the class of total workers, cultivators numbered 14,800 and formed 10.56%, agricultural labourers numbered 21,150 and formed 15.08%, household industry workers numbered 4,640 and formed 3.31% and other workers numbered 99,622 and formed 71.05%. Total workers numbered 140,212 and formed 37.51% of the total population, and non-workers numbered 233,564 and formed 62.49% of the population.

Note: In the census records a person is considered a cultivator, if the person is engaged in cultivation/ supervision of land owned by self/government/institution. When a person who works on another person's land for wages in cash or kind or share, is regarded as an agricultural labourer. Household industry is defined as an industry conducted by one or more members of the family within the household or village, and one that does not qualify for registration as a factory under the Factories Act. Other workers are persons engaged in some economic activity other than cultivators, agricultural labourers and household workers. It includes factory, mining, plantation, transport and office workers, those engaged in business and commerce, teachers, entertainment artistes and so on.

=== Infrastructure ===
There are 26 inhabited villages in the Rajganj CD block, as per the District Census Handbook, Jalpaiguri, 2011. 100% villages have power supply. 100% villages have drinking water supply. 14 villages (53.85%) have post offices. 100% villages have telephones (including landlines, public call offices and mobile phones). 18 villages (69.23%) have pucca (paved) approach roads and 18 villages (69.23%) have transport communication (includes bus service, rail facility and navigable waterways). 2 villages (7.69%) have agricultural credit societies and 6 villages (23.08%) have banks.

=== Agriculture ===
The economy of the Jalpaiguri district is mainly dependent on agriculture and plantations, and majority of the people are engaged in agriculture. Jalpaiguri is well-known for tea and timber. Other important crops are paddy, jute, tobacco, mustard seeds, sugarcane and wheat. The annual average rainfall is 3,440 mm, around double of that of Kolkata and the surrounding areas. The area is flood prone and the rivers often change course causing immense damage to crops and cultivated lands.

In 2013-14, there were 74 fertiliser depots, 47 seed stores and 53 fair price shops in the Rajganj CD block.

In 2013–14, the Rajganj CD block produced 5,074 tonnes of Aman paddy, the main winter crop, from 2,555 hectares, 23,487 tonnes of Boro paddy (spring crop) from 11,722 hectares, 685 tonnes of Aus paddy (summer crop) from 362 hectares, 2,142 tonnes of wheat from 999 hectares, 38 tonnes of maize from 18 hectares, 60,945 tonnes of jute from 4,347 hectares and 84,349 tonnes of potatoes from 2,798 hectares. It also produced pulses and oilseeds.

In 2013-14, the total area irrigated in the Rajganj CD block was 24,033 hectares, out of which 22,748 hectares were irrigated by canal water, 130 hectares by tank water, 420 hectares by river lift irrigation, 4 hectares by deep tube wells and 117 hectares by shallow tube wells.

=== Dooars-Terai tea gardens ===
Tea gardens in the Dooars and Terai regions produce 226 million kg or over a quarter of India's total tea crop.. The Dooars-Terai tea is characterized by a bright, smooth and full-bodied liquor that's a wee bit lighter than Assam tea. Cultivation of tea in the Dooars was primarily pioneered and promoted by the British but there was significant contribution of Indian entrepreneurs.

=== Banking ===
In 2013-14, Rajganj CD block had offices of 10 commercial banks and 5 gramin banks.

=== Backward Regions Grant Fund ===
The Jalpaiguri district is listed as a backward region and receives financial support from the Backward Regions Grant Fund. The fund, created by the Government of India, is designed to redress regional imbalances in development. As of 2012, 272 districts across the country were listed under this scheme. The list includes 11 districts of West Bengal.

== Transport ==
Rajganj CD block has 1 ferry service, 5 originating/ terminating bus routes.

== Education ==
In 2013-14, Rajganj CD block had 163 primary schools with 23,157 students, 9 middle schools with 1,499 students, 10 high schools with 12,102 students and 14 higher secondary schools with 19,456 students. Rajganj CD block had 2 general degree college with 2,545 students, 2 technical/ professional institutions with 167 students and 545 institutions for special and non-formal education with 45,733 students.

See also – Education in India

According to the 2011 census, in Rajganj CD block, among the 26 inhabited villages, all villages had a school, 19 villages had two or more primary schools, 10 villages had at least 1 primary and 1 middle school and 10 villages had at least 1 middle and 1 secondary school.

North Bengal St. Xavier’s College, a Jesuit institution was established at Rajganj in 2007. Affiliated with the University of North Bengal it offers courses in arts, science and commerce.

Rajganj College was established in 2009. Affiliated with the University of North Bengal, it offers courses in arts.

== Healthcare ==
In 2014, Rajganj CD block had 1 rural hospital, 3 primary health centres and 2 NGO/ private nursing home with total 90 beds and 12 doctors (excluding private bodies). It had 48 family welfare subcentres. 4,283 patients were treated indoor and 240,537 patients were treated outdoor in the hospitals, health centres and subcentres of the CD block.

Rajganj Rural Hospital, with 30 beds at Payachari, is the major government medical facility in the Rajganj CD block. There are primary health centres at Kalinagar (with 10 beds), Sikarpur (with 6 beds), Kukrajn (Sukbari) (with 6 beds).
