= Saktigarh =

Saktigarh may refer to:

- Saktigarh, Siliguri, Jalpaiguri district, West Bengal, India
- Saktigarh, Bardhaman, town in Bardhaman district, West Bengal, India
- Saktigarh railway station, in Bardhaman district.
- Shaktigarh, Uttarakhand, town in Udham Singh Nagar district, Uttarakhand.
