= Phulbari, Jalpaiguri =

Phulbari Fulbari
- Town
- Location in West Bengal, India Phulbari (India)
- Coordinates: 26.6363°N 88.4166°E
- Country: India
- State: West Bengal
- District: Jalpaiguri

Languages
  - Official: Bengali, English
- Time zone: UTC+5:30 (IST)
- Vehicle registration: WB
- Nearest city: Siliguri / Jalpaiguri
- Lok Sabha constituency: Jalpaiguri
- Vidhan Sabha constituency: Dabgram-Phulbari
- Website: wb.gov.in

Phulbari also known as Fulbari is a road border crossing for vehicles and people on the India-Bangladesh border and a proposed municipality in Rajganj community development block in Jalpaiguri district in the Indian state of West Bengal. The Bangladesh side of the border crossing is Banglabandha.

== Geography ==
Places and tea estates in Jalpaiguri Sadar subdivision (including Rajganj, Jalpaiguri, Maynaguri and Dhupguri CD blocks) in Jalpaiguri district
CT: census town, R: rural/ urban centre, N: neighbourhood, C: cantonment, NP: national park/ wildlife sanctuary, TE: tea estate
Abbreviations used in names – TG for Tea Garden (town/village), TE for Tea Estate, JRS: junction railway station
Owing to space constraints in the small map, the actual locations in a larger map may vary slightly

=== Area overview ===
The map alongside shows the alluvial floodplains south of the outer foothills of the Himalayas. The area is mostly flat, except for low hills in the northern portions. It is a primarily rural area with 62.01% of the population living in rural areas and a moderate 37.99% living in the urban areas. Tea gardens in the Dooars and Terai regions produce 226 million kg or over a quarter of India's total tea crop. Some tea gardens were identified in the 2011 census as census towns or villages. Such places are marked in the map as CT (census town) or R (rural/ urban centre). Specific tea estate pages are marked TE.

Note: The map alongside presents some of the notable locations in the subdivision. All places marked in the map are linked in the larger full screen map.

== Border crossing ==
Border crossing of vehicles between Phulbari in India and Banglabandha in Bangladesh was inaugurated in January 2011. Earlier, Nepal-Bangladesh transit through the border started in a limited manner in 1997. Goods-laden trucks from both sides cross the border and unload the goods at warehouses in the other country. The Indian Finance Minister Pranab Mukherjee and Bangladesh's Agriculture Minister Matia Chowdhury attended the inauguration ceremony. This border crossing can also be used for the movement of people between Bangladesh and India.

There are complaints about lack of proper facilities at the border, and condition of the road between Phulbari and India-Nepal border. India has taken steps to improve the 42 kilometres (26 mi) road between Kankarbhitta, where the Nepalese check-post is located, across the Mechi River from NH 31C and Phulbari border post on State Highway 12.

== See also ==
- India-Bangladesh Border Ceremonies
- Dabgram
- Changrabandha
- Hili
- Singhabad
