= Maynaguri (community development block) =

- Community development block
- Coordinates: 26.57°N 88.82°E
- Country: India
- State: West Bengal
- District: Jalpaiguri

Area
  - Total: 530.60 km^{2} (204.87 sq mi)

Population (2011)
  - Total: 329,932
  - Density: 621.81/km^{2} (1,610.5/sq mi)

Languages
  - Official: Bengali, English
- Time zone: UTC+5:30 (IST)
- Lok Sabha constituency: Jalpaiguri
- Vidhan Sabha constituency: Maynaguri
- Website: jalpaiguri.gov.in

Maynaguri is a community development block (CD block) that forms an administrative division in the Jalpaiguri Sadar subdivision of the Jalpaiguri district in the Indian state of West Bengal.

== Geography ==
Mainaguri is located at 26.57°N 88.82°E.

The Maynaguri CD block lies in the southern part of the district with the Teesta River flowing along a portion of its western boundary and the Jaldhaka River flowing along its eastern boundary. It lies on a gently sloping alluvial plain locally called Terai.

The Maynaguri CD block is bounded by the Matiali and Nagrakata CD blocks on the north, Dhupguri and Banarhat CD block on the east, Haldibari and Mekhliganj CD blocks in Cooch Behar district on the south, and Jalpaiguri and Kranti CD blocks on the west.

The Maynaguri CD block has an area of 530.60 km^{2}. It has 1 panchayat samity, 16 gram panchayats, 234 gram sansads (village councils), 86 mouzas, 79 inhabited villages, 1 municipality, 1 census town.The municipality are: Mainaguri.The census town are:Dakshin Khagrabari. Mainaguri police station serves this block. Headquarters of this CD block is at Mainaguri.

Gram panchayats of Maynaguri block/ panchayat samiti are: Amguri, Barnis, Churabhandar, Dharmapur, Domohoni II, Khagrabari II, Madhabdanga II, Padamoti I, Padamoti II, Ramshai, Saptibari I and Saptibari II. Gram panchayats of Maynaguri block Maynaguri, Domohoni I, Khagrabari I and Madhabdanga I are now Mainaguri municipality.

== Demographics ==
=== Population ===
According to the 2011 Census of India, the Maynaguri CD block had a total population of 329,932, of which 291,073 were rural, and 37,959 were urban. There were 170,030 (52%) males and 159,002 (48%) females. There were 41,633 people in the age range of 0 to 6 years. The Scheduled Castes numbered 234,287 (71.20%) and the Scheduled Tribes numbered 4,328 (1.32%).

According to the 2001 census, Maynagurii block had a total population of 281,554, out of which 145,557 were males and 135,997 were females. Maynaguri block registered a population growth of 18.22 per cent during the 1991-2001 decade.

Census towns in the Maynaguri CD block are (2011 census figures in brackets): Mainaguri (30,490) and Dakshin Khagrabari (7,469).

Large villages (with 4,000+ population) in the Maynaguri CD block are (2011 census figures in brackets): Jharbaragila (5,502), Kumarpur (5,336), Baulbari (5,711), Kanthalbari (4,591), Uttar Marichbari (6,174), Dharmmapur (8,353), Dakshin Ulladabari (4,586), Ulladabri (5,722), Uttar Maumari (4,978), Singimari (4,316), Betgara (4,739), Amguri (6,134), Uttar Khagrabari (5,076), Uttar Madhabdanga (6,610), Bara Kamet (4,009), Penchahahi (4,848), Padamti (8,407), Bhatpatti (4,250), Paschim Harmati (4,344), Basilardanga (4,248), Tekatali (4,507), Dwarikamari (4,018), Chura Bhandar (4,064), Charchura Bhandar (4,311), Jabaramli (6,688), Saptibari (23,693) and Baikur Gougram (10,822).

Other villages in the Maynaguri CD block include (2011 census figures in brackets): Barnes (2,893), Domohani (1,507), Madhabdanga (1423), Uttar Putimari (1806) and Ramsai (1,974).

=== Literacy ===
According to the 2011 census, the total number of literate people in the Maynagauri CD block was 217,359 (75.63% of the population over 6 years) out of which males numbered 121,785 (81.98% of the male population over 6 years) and females numbered 95,574 (68.84% of the female population over 6 years). The gender disparity (the difference between female and male literacy rates) was 13.14%.

See also – List of West Bengal districts ranked by literacy rate

Literacy in CD blocks of
Jalpaiguri district
Jalpaiguri Sadar subdivision
Rajganj – 62.82%
Jalpaiguri – 73.81%
Maynaguri – 75.63%
Dhupguri – 60.57%
Malbazar subdivision
Mal – 66.31
Matiali – 66.98%
Nagrakata – 61.27%
Alipurduar subdivision
Madarihat-Birpara – 67.77%
Kalchini – 68.96%
Kumargram – 72.42%
Alipurduar I – 78.19%
Alipurduar II – 75.76%
Falakata – 72.64%
2011 Census: CD Block Wise

Primary Census Abstract Data

=== Language and religion ===
Religion in Maynaguri CD block (2011)
Hinduism	90.02%
Islam	9.79%
Other or not stated	0.19%

In the 2011 Census of India, Hindus numbered 296,184 and formed 90.02% of the population of Maynaguri CD block. Muslims numbered 32,218 and formed 9.79% of the population. Christians numbered 105 and formed 0.03% of the population. Others numbered 525 and formed 0.16% of the population. Others include Addi Bassi, Marang Boro, Santal, Saranath, Sari Dharma, Sarna, Alchchi, Bidin, Sant, Saevdharm, Seran, Saran, Sarin, Kheria, and other religious communities.

Languages of Maynaguri CD block (2011)
1. Bengali (84.3%)
2. 'Other' Bengali (8.40%)
3. Rajbongshi (5.08%)
4. Sadri (1.02%)
5. Others (1.24%)

At the time of the 2011 census, 84.26% of the population spoke Bengali, 5.08% Rajbongshi and 1.02% Sadri as their first language. 8.40% were recorded as speaking 'Other' under Bengali.

== Poverty level ==
Based on a study of the per capita consumption in rural and urban areas, using central sample data of NSS 55th Round 1999-2000, Jalpaiguri district was found to have relatively high rates of poverty of 35.73% in rural areas and 61.53% in the urban areas. It was one of the few districts where urban poverty rate was higher than the rural poverty rate.

According to a World Bank report, as of 2012, 26-31% of the population of Jalpaiguri, Bankura and Paschim Medinipur districts were below poverty line, a relatively high level of poverty in West Bengal, which had an average 20% of the population below poverty line.

== Economy ==
=== Livelihood ===
Livelihood
in Maynaguri CD block
1. Cultivators (29.9%)
2. Agricultural labourers (35.1%)
3. Household industries (1.72%)
4. Other Workers (33.3%)

In the Maynaguri CD block in 2011, among the class of total workers, cultivators numbered 35,952 and formed 29.89%, agricultural labourers numbered 42,247 and formed 35.12%, household industry workers numbered 2,068 and formed 1.72% and other workers numbered 40,024 and formed 33.27%. Total workers numbered 120,291 and formed 42.19% of the total population, and non-workers numbered 208,741 and formed 63.44% of the population.

Note: In the census records a person is considered a cultivator, if the person is engaged in cultivation/ supervision of land owned by self/government/institution. When a person who works on another person's land for wages in cash or kind or share, is regarded as an agricultural labourer. Household industry is defined as an industry conducted by one or more members of the family within the household or village, and one that does not qualify for registration as a factory under the Factories Act. Other workers are people engaged in some economic activity other than cultivators, agricultural labourers and household workers. It includes factory, mining, plantation, transport and office workers, those engaged in business and commerce, teachers, entertainment artistes and so on.

=== Infrastructure ===
There are 79 inhabited villages in the Maynaguri CD block, as per the District Census Handbook, Jalpaiguri, 2011. 100% villages have power supply. 77 (97.47) villages have drinking water supply. 30 villages (37.97%) have post offices. 73 villages (92.41%) have telephones (including landlines, public call offices and mobile phones). 47 villages (59.49%) have pucca (paved) approach roads and 44 villages (55.70%) have transport communication (includes bus service, rail facility and navigable waterways). 17 villages (21.52%) have agricultural credit societies and 11 villages (13.92%) have banks.

=== Agriculture ===
The economy of the Jalpaiguri district is mainly dependent on agriculture and plantations, and majority of the people are engaged in agriculture. Jalpaiguri is well-known for tea and timber. Other important crops are paddy, jute, tobacco, mustard seeds, sugarcane and wheat. The annual average rainfall is 3,440 mm, around double of that of Kolkata and the surrounding areas. The area is flood prone and the rivers often change course causing immense damage to crops and cultivated lands .

In 2013-14, there were 194 fertiliser depots, 87 seed stores and 60 fair price shops in the Maynaguri CD block.

In 2013–14, the Maynaguri CD block produced 119,513 tonnes of Aman paddy, the main winter crop, from 44,174 hectares, 4,414 tonnes of Boro paddy (spring crop) from 1,478 hectares, 7,103 tonnes of Aus paddy (summer crop) from 3,337 hectares, 6,732 tonnes of wheat from 3,005 hectares, 117,608 tonnes of jute from 8,964 hectares, 147,712 tonnes of potatoes from 5,884 hectares and 819 tonnes of sugarcane from 8 hectares. It also produced pulses and oilseeds.

In 2013-14, the total area irrigated in the Maynaguri CD block was 8,988 hectares, out of which 1,713 hectares were irrigated by canal water, 360 hectares by tank water, 2,2220 hectares by river lift irrigation, 420 hectares by deep tube wells and 4,275 hectares by shallow tube wells.

=== Dooars-Terai tea gardens ===
Tea gardens in the Dooars and Terai regions produce 226 million kg or over a quarter of India's total tea crop.. The Dooars-Terai tea is characterized by a bright, smooth and full-bodied liquor that's a wee bit lighter than Assam tea. Cultivation of tea in the Dooars was primarily pioneered and promoted by the British but there was significant contribution of Indian entrepreneurs.

=== Banking ===
In 2013-14, Maynaguri CD block had offices of 9 commercial banks and 4 gramin banks.

=== Backward Regions Grant Fund ===
The Jalpaiguri district is listed as a backward region and receives financial support from the Backward Regions Grant Fund. The fund, created by the Government of India, is designed to redress regional imbalances in development. As of 2012, 272 districts across the country were listed under this scheme. The list includes 11 districts of West Bengal.

== Transport ==
Maynaguri CD block has 1 ferry service, 6 originating/ terminating bus routes.

NH 31 passes through the block.

== Education ==
In 2013-14, Maynaguri CD block had 208 primary schools with 23,634 students, 11 middle schools with 1,191 students, 9 high schools with 8.185 students and 20 higher secondary schools with 33,408 students. Mayanaguri CD block had 1 general degree college with 4,782 students, 2 technical/ professional institutions with 988 students and 551 institutions for special and non-formal education with 40,176 students.

According to the 2011 census, in Maynaguri CD block, among the 79 inhabited villages, 2 villages did not have schools, 64 villages had two or more primary schools, 34 villages had at least 1 primary and 1 middle school and 16 villages had at least 1 middle and 1 secondary school.

- Maynaguri College was established in 1999. Affiliated with the University of North Bengal, it offers courses it offers courses in arts and science.
- Maynaguri Government Polytechnic College was established in 2015. Approved by AICTE & affiliated by WBSCTE. This polytechnic offers diploma courses(10+3) in Instrumentation and Control Engineering, Survey Engineering and Civil Engineering with 60 intake capacity of each stream.
- Manoranjan Saha Memorial B.ed College, also known as Maynaguri B.ed College, was established in 2010. This college offers B.ed & D.El.Ed Courses, is approved by the National Council for Teacher Education and is affiliated to WBUTTEPA University.
- Maynaguri Government iti, established in 2016.This iti recognized by National Council for Vocational Education and Training and under the 'Directorate of Industrial Training' (DIT), West Bengal.

There are also many higher secondary schools viz. Maynaguri High School, Maynagurui Girls High School, Subhasnagar High School, Jalpesh L.K. High School, Bhotpatty H.B.L. High School, Padamati Union Rahimuddin High School, Jorepakri Abdul Gani High School, Putimari M.M. High School, Maynaguri Road High School etc. under the state education board.

== Healthcare ==
In 2014, Maynaguri CD block had 1 rural hospital, 6 primary health centres, and 3 NGO/ private nursing home with total 112 beds and 14 doctors (excluding private bodies). It had 46 family welfare subcentres. 11,901 patients were treated indoor and 148,141 patients were treated outdoor in the hospitals, health centres and subcentres of the CD block.

Maynaguri Rural Hospital, with 60 beds at Mainaguri, is the major government medical facility in the Maynaguri CD block. There are primary health centres at Barnes (with 10 beds), Bhurangabari (PO Bakali) (with 10 beds), Churabhandar (with 10 beds), Singhimari (Domohoni) (with 6 beds), Saptibari (with 10 beds), Ramsi (PO Panbari) (with 6 beds).
