= Belakoba =

- Town
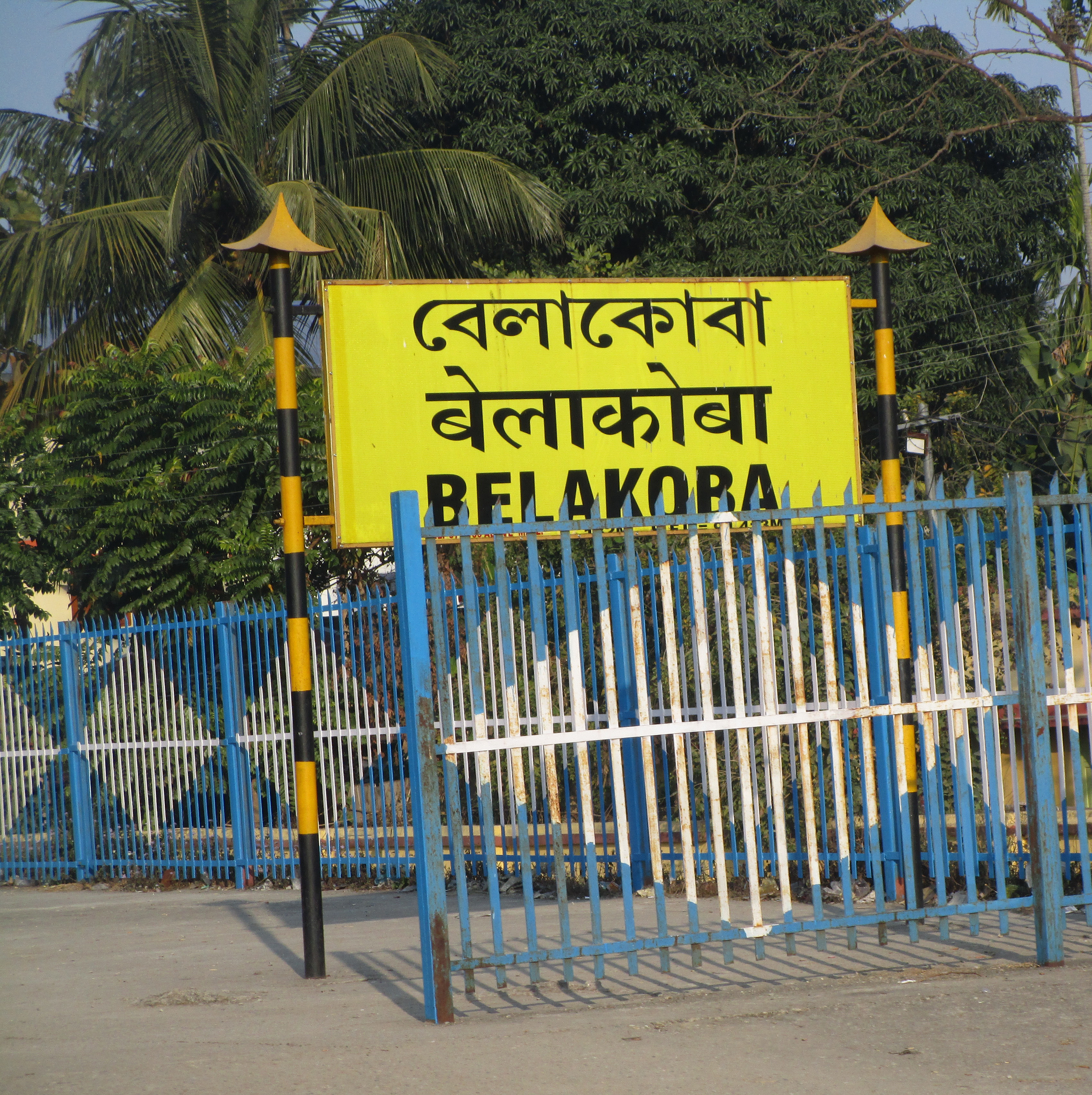
- Nameplate of Belakoba Rail Station

- Location in West Bengal, India Belakoba (India)
- Coordinates: 26.590°N 88.589°E
- Country: India
- State: West Bengal
- District: Jalpaiguri

Area
  - Total: 33.96 km^{2} (13.11 sq mi)

Population (2001)
  - Total: 17,615
  - Density: 518.7/km^{2} (1,343/sq mi)

Languages
  - Official: Bengali, English
- Time zone: UTC+5:30 (IST)
- Postal code: 735133
- Vehicle registration: WB
- Lok Sabha constituency: Jalpaiguri
- Vidhan Sabha constituency: Rajganj

Belakoba is a small town in Jalpaiguri Sadar subdivision of Jalpaiguri district in the Indian state of West Bengal, known for its Chamcham, a type of sweet originating in the Pora Bari locale of Bangladesh. Belakoba is not only a cradle to Chamcham, but also cradle to art and music.

== Geography ==
Places and tea estates in Jalpaiguri Sadar subdivision (including Rajganj, Jalpaiguri, Maynaguri and Dhupguri CD blocks) in Jalpaiguri district
CT: census town, R: rural/ urban centre, N: neighbourhood, C: cantonment, NP: national park/ wildlife sanctuary, TE: tea estate
Abbreviations used in names – TG for Tea Garden (town/village), TE for Tea Estate, JRS: junction railway station
Owing to space constraints in the small map, the actual locations in a larger map may vary slightly

=== Area overview ===
The map alongside shows the alluvial floodplains south of the outer foothills of the Himalayas. The area is mostly flat, except for low hills in the northern portions. It is a primarily rural area with 62.01% of the population living in rural areas and a moderate 37.99% living in the urban areas. Tea gardens in the Dooars and Terai regions produce 226 million kg or over a quarter of India's total tea crop. Some tea gardens were identified in the 2011 census as census towns or villages. Such places are marked in the map as CT (census town) or R (rural/ urban centre). Specific tea estate pages are marked TE.

Note: The map alongside presents some of the notable locations in the subdivision. All places marked in the map are linked in the larger full screen map.

== Demographics ==
As per 2001 census, Belakoba had a total population of 21,615. Decadal growth for the district was 21.52 per cent. Decadal growth in West Bengal was 17.84 per cent.

== Transportation ==
Belakoba is located 17 km distance from the city of Jalpaiguri, which is the district as well as the subdivisional headquarters & 28 km from the City of Siliguri, which is the largest city in the region. The town is 446 km far from its state capital city of Kolkata. Other nearest towns are Rajganj (9.2 km), Maynaguri (24.4 km), Mal (32.9 km). Belakoba has a well-developed transportation network. The town can be accessed by rail or roads. The Belakoba railway station serves the place directly.

== Healthcare ==
Belacoba Rural Hospital, with 30 beds at Prasannanagar, is the major government medical facility in the Jalpaiguri CD block.

== Notable people ==
- Ratan Lal Basu, an economist and a fiction author in English. Most of his books and articles in economics are based on ancient Indian economic ideas, especially embedded in the epics (Ramayana and Mahabharata), dharmasastras and Arthasastra of Kautilya and their modern relevance. He is also specialized in yoga and tantra cult and has written several books and articles on these topics.
