= Sikha Chatterjee =

Indian politician

Member of the West Bengal Legislative Assembly
- Incumbent
- Assumed office 2 May 2021
- Preceded by: Goutam Deb
- Constituency: Dabgram-Phulbari

Personal details
- Party: Bharatiya Janata Party
- Education: 12th Pass
- Profession: Politician

Sikha Chatterjee is an Indian politician from Bharatiya Janata Party. In May 2021, she was elected as a member of the West Bengal Legislative Assembly from Dabgram-Phulbari constituency in Jalpaiguri district. She defeated Trinamool Congress heavyweight minister of West Bengal Goutam Deb with the margin of 27,593 votes. She was the opposition leader of Rajganj Panchayat Samiti. She was former leader of Trinamool Congress.
