= Barnesh =

Village in West Bengal, India

- Gram panchayat
- Interactive map of Barnesh
- Coordinates: 26°30′24″N 88°47′28″E
- Country: India
- State: West Bengal
- District: Jalpaiguri
- Block: Maynaguri

Government
  - Type: Gram panchayat

Languages
  - Official: Bengali, English
- Time zone: UTC+5:30 (IST)
- Lok Sabha constituency: Jalpaiguri
- Vidhan Sabha constituency: Maynaguri
- Website: https://jalpaigurizp.in/

Barnesh (also spelled Barnes, Barnis or Barnish) is a village and a gram panchayat in the Maynaguri CD block in the Jalpaiguri Sadar subdivision of the Jalpaiguri district in the state of West Bengal, India.

== Villages ==
The gram panchayat consists of twelve villages, viz: Barnes, Dakshin Marichbari, Dakshin Putimari, Dakshin Sisuabari, Dakshin Ulladabri, Gopalganj, Sisuabari, Ulladabri, Uttar Dangapara, Uttar Marichbari, Uttar Putimari and Uttar Sisuabari.
