= Berubari, West Bengal =

Village in West Bengal, India

Berubari
- Village
- Location within West Bengal Location within India
- Coordinates: 26°24′29″N 88°42′14″E
- Country: India
- State: West Bengal
- District: Jalpaiguri
- Block: Jalpaiguri

Government
  - Type: Village Panchayat

Area
  - Total: 64.24 km^{2} (24.80 sq mi)
- Elevation: 73 m (240 ft)

Population (2011)
  - Total: 41,593
  - Density: 647.5/km^{2} (1,677/sq mi)

Languages
  - Official: Bengali, English
- Time zone: UTC+5:30 (IST)
- PIN: 735132
- STD code: 03561
- Vehicle registration: WB-71, WB-72

Berubari is a village in Jalpaiguri Block, Jalpaiguri District, West Bengal, India. It is located near the border with Bangladesh, approximately 12.7 kilometres south of the district and block capital Jalpaiguri. In 2011, it has a total population of 41,593.

== Geography ==
Berubari is located to the west of the Teesta River. It is located to the south of Dhapganj Hat, west of Araji Garalbari, north of Dhantala, and east of Chhitland of Singimari. The village covers an area of 6424.09 hectares.

== Demographics ==
According to the 2011 Census of India, there are 9,643 households within Berubari. Among the 41,493 residents, 21,215 are male and 20,378 are female. The total literacy rate is 67.46%, with 15,724 of the male population and 12,269 of the female population being literate. The census location code of Berubari is 307616.
