= Dakshin Khagrabari =

- Census Town
- Location in West Bengal, India Dakshin Khagrabari (India)
- Coordinates: 26.5554°N 88.8381°E
- Country: India
- State: West Bengal
- District: Jalpaiguri

Government
  - Type: Municipality
  - Body: Maynaguri Municipality

Area
  - Total: 4.3598 km^{2} (1.6833 sq mi)

Population (2011)
  - Total: 7,469
  - Density: 1,713/km^{2} (4,437/sq mi)
- Time zone: UTC+5:30 (IST)
- PIN: 735224
- Telephone/STD code: 03561
- Vehicle registration: WB
- Lok Sabha constituency: Jalpaiguri
- Vidhan Sabha constituency: Maynaguri
- Website: jalpaiguri.gov.in

Dakshin Khagrabari is a census town in the Maynaguri CD block in the Jalpaiguri Sadar subdivision of the Jalpaiguri district in the state of West Bengal, India.

== Geography ==
Places and tea estates in Jalpaiguri Sadar subdivision (including Rajganj, Jalpaiguri, Maynaguri and Dhupguri CD blocks) in Jalpaiguri district
CT: census town, R: rural/ urban centre, N: neighbourhood, C: cantonment, NP: national park/ wildlife sanctuary, TE: tea estate
Abbreviations used in names – TG for Tea Garden (town/village), TE for Tea Estate, JRS: junction railway station
Owing to space constraints in the small map, the actual locations in a larger map may vary slightly

=== Location ===
Dakshin Khagrabari is located at 26.5554°N 88.8381°E.

=== Area overview ===
The map alongside shows the alluvial floodplains south of the outer foothills of the Himalayas. The area is mostly flat, except for low hills in the northern portions. It is a primarily rural area with 62.01% of the population living in rural areas and a moderate 37.99% living in the urban areas. Tea gardens in the Dooars and Terai regions produce 226 million kg or over a quarter of India's total tea crop. Some tea gardens were identified in the 2011 census as census towns or villages. Such places are marked in the map as CT (census town) or R (rural/ urban centre). Specific tea estate pages are marked TE.

Note: The map alongside presents some of the notable locations in the subdivision. All places marked in the map are linked in the larger full screen map.

== Demographics ==
According to the 2011 Census of India, Dakshin Khagrabari had a total population of 7,469 of which 3,786 (51%) were males and 3,683 (49%) were females. There were 797 persons in the age range of 0 to 6 years. The total number of literate people in Dakshin Khagrabari was 5,108 (76.56% of the population over 6 years).

== Infrastructure ==
According to the District Census Handbook 2011, Jalpaiguri, Dakshin Khagrabari covered an area of 4.3598 km^{2}. Among the civic amenities, it had 21.5 km roads, the protected water supply involved tube well, bore well, uncovered wells. It had 879 domestic electric connections, 78 road lighting points. Among the medical facilities it had 1 family welfare centre, 1 maternity and child welfare unit. Among the educational facilities it had 4 primary schools, 1 secondary schools, the nearest senior secondary school at Mainaguri 1 km away. It had 4 non-formal education centres (Sarva Shiksha Abhiyan), 1 special school for the disabled. It had branch of 1 agricultural credit society.
