= Sukani, West Bengal =

Village in West Bengal, India

Sukani
- Village
- Location within West Bengal Location within India
- Coordinates: 26°31′03″N 88°32′48″E
- Country: India
- State: West Bengal
- District: Jalpaiguri
- Block: Rajganj

Government
  - Type: Sarpanch

Area
  - Total: 55.81 km^{2} (21.55 sq mi)
- Elevation: 89 m (292 ft)

Population (2011)
  - Total: 35,276
  - Density: 632.1/km^{2} (1,637/sq mi)

Languages
  - Official: Bengali
- Time zone: UTC+5:30 (IST)
- PIN: 735134
- STD code: 0353
- Vehicle registration: WB-71

Sukani is a village in the Indian state of West Bengal. It is located in the northeastern part of the country, near the national border with Bangladesh. As of the 2011 census results, the village had a reported population of 35,276.

== Geography ==
Sukani is situated along the banks of Chauli River, with the National Highway 27 passing through its north. It has an area of 5580.58 hectares.

== Demographics ==
Sukani had a population at 35,276 in the 2011 Census of India. Working population accounted for 33.75% of the general population: 9,559 male residents and 2,346 female residents. The literacy rate was 65.72%, with 12,892 male residents and 10,292 female residents being literate.
