= Domohani, Jalpaiguri =

Village in West Bengal, India

Domohani
- Village
- Location in West Bengal, India Domohani (India)
- Coordinates: 26.57°N 88.77°E
- Country: India
- State: West Bengal
- District: Jalpaiguri

Population (2011)
  - Total: 1,507

Languages
  - Official: Bengali, English
- Time zone: UTC+5:30 (IST)
- PIN: 735302
- Lok Sabha constituency: Jalpaiguri
- Vidhan Sabha constituency: Maynaguri

Domohani is a village located in Maynaguri CD block in the Jalpaiguri district in the state of West Bengal, India.
