= Ratan Lal Basu =

Indian writer (born 1948)

- Born: 23 December 1948 (age 77); Belakoba, Jalpaiguri district, West Bengal, India
- Education: Presidency College, Kolkata (now Presidency University)
- Occupations: Economist, Fiction author

Ratan Lal Basu (Bengali: রতন লাল বসু; born 23 December 1948) is an economist and English fiction author. Most of his books and articles in economics are based on ancient Indian economic ideas, especially embedded in the epics (Ramayana and Mahabharata), dharmasastras and Arthasastra of Kautilya and their modern relevance. He is also specialized in yoga and tantra cult and has written several books and articles on these topics.

== Childhood and parents ==
The place of birth of Dr. Ratan Lal Basu is the village Belakoba in the Jalpaiguri district of West Bengal, India. He was born on 23 December 1948. His father Sri Mahendra Lal Bose was educated from St. Xavier’s School and College, Calcutta, he later on got settled at the village Belakoba and played a pioneering role in establishing many schools in the remote villages of the Jalpaiguri district. Ratan Lal Basu now resides at Birati, North 24 Parganas.

== Education ==
Dr. Basu studied in and passed Higher Secondary Examination from Belakoba High School 17 km from Jalpaiguri town. Dr. Basu did his Honors and M.A. degrees in Economics from Presidency College, Kolkata, then affiliated with the University of Kolkata, and at present upgraded to Presidency University, Kolkata, and did Ph.D. on the Arthashastra of Kautilya, a treatise on Economics, Politics and Espionage, written around 300 B.C.

== Service ==
Dr. Basu joined a Government-sponsored college affiliated with the University of Calcutta, as a Lecturer in Economics and later on became a Reader and retired as the Teacher-in-Charge (Acting Principal).

He was the Treasurer, Bengal Economic Association (Bangiya Arthaniti Parishad) from June 2009 to May 2014.

He has been a faculty of Fundación MenteClara, Berazategui, Buenos Aires, Argentina since 26 September 2020.

== Bibliography ==
=== Collection of Short Stories ===
==== Bengali ====
- অসাধারণ সুন্দর ও অন্যান্য গল্প
- গণেশ ঠাকুরের ভক্ত ও অন্যান্য গল্প
- ডায়ারির পাতা থেকে
- দূরের পাহাড় ও অন্যান্য গল্প
- প্রতিবিম্ব
- ভাত-ডাল দেবেতো! ও অন্যান্য গল্প
- "নীল পাহাড় ও অন্যান্য গল্প"
- গল্পের ফুলঝুরি
- স্মৃতির পাতা থেকে

==== English ====
- Blue Are the Far Off Mountains
- Dream In A Rainy Day
- Horror Of Yakshini
- Mod Lady and the Prabhus
- Stories for Children
- Blue Bird of the Pacific Island

=== Novels ===
==== Bengali ====
- স্বপ্ন স্মৃতি বাস্তব
- স্বপ্ন

==== English ====
- The Oraon and His Tree Friend
- The Curse of the Goddess
- The Tribal and the Divine Tree

=== Travelogue ===
- Fantastic Hill Trek
- Tagore, Hepburn and Shahrukh Khan

=== Economics ===
- Ancient Indian Economic Thought, Relevance for Today
- Material Progress, Ethics & Human Development
- Kautilya's Arthashastra (300 B.C.): Economic Ideas
- Mahabharata, the Great Indian Epic: Economic Ideas
- Manusmriti, the Hindu Law Book: Economic Ideas
- Glimpses of the Indian Economy: Ancient & Modern
- Economic Concepts: Ancient & Modern
- Global Crisis and Adam Smith
- Democracy and Future of Mankind
- The Political Economy of Ancient India
- Ancient Indian Political Economy
- Price Control Mechanism in Arthasastra
- Poverty, Amartya Sen and Adam Smith
- Price Policy in Arthasastra

=== Hindu philosophy ===
- Raj Yoga
- Karma Yoga
- Principles of Hatha Yoga
- Bhakti Yoga
- Lord Krishna Mystery
- Atharva Veda, A Brief Outline
- Tantra Cult
- Tantra Cult and Yoga
- "Scientific and Beneficial Aspects of Tantra Cult"
- "Panchatantra and Its Lessons"

=== Espionage ===
- Horror of Soviet Secret Police
- Stories of Spies
- Espionage Agency Mossad and Eichmann Drama
- Espionage Mechanism in the Arthasastra of Kautilya
- Espionage Agencies and Remarkable Spies
- Cold War, KGB & Soviet Social Imperialism
- Espionage Methods and The Horror of Echelon-Imint and The CIA
- Atomic Espionage and Atom Spies
