= Kharia, Jalpaiguri =

Kharia
- Census Town
- Location in West Bengal, India Kharia (India)
- Coordinates: 26.531267°N 88.702433°E
- Country: India
- State: West Bengal
- District: Jalpaiguri

Area
  - Total: 58.0255 km^{2} (22.4038 sq mi)

Population (2011)
  - Total: 61,661
  - Density: 1,062.7/km^{2} (2,752.3/sq mi)
- Time zone: UTC+5:30 (IST)
- PIN: 735102
- Telephone/STD code: 03561
- Vehicle registration: WB
- Lok Sabha constituency: Jalpaiguri
- Vidhan Sabha constituency: Jalpaiguri
- Website: jalpaiguri.gov.in

Kharia is a census town and a gram panchayat in the Jalpaiguri CD block in the Jalpaiguri Sadar subdivision of the Jalpaiguri district in the state of West Bengal, India.

== Geography ==
Places and tea estates in Jalpaiguri Sadar subdivision (including Rajganj, Jalpaiguri, Maynaguri and Dhupguri CD blocks) in Jalpaiguri district
CT: census town, R: rural/ urban centre, N: neighbourhood, C: cantonment, NP: national park/ wildlife sanctuary, TE: tea estate
Abbreviations used in names – TG for Tea Garden (town/village), TE for Tea Estate, JRS: junction railway station
Owing to space constraints in the small map, the actual locations in a larger map may vary slightly

=== Location ===
Kharia is located at 26.531267°N 88.702433°E.

The map of the Jalpaiguri CD block on page 393 in the District Census Handbook, Jalpaiguri, 2011 census, shows Kharia spread around the west side of Jalpauguri city.

== Demographics ==
According to the 2011 Census of India, Kharia had a total population of 61,661 of which 31,510 (51%) were males and 30,151 (49%) were females. There were 6,666 persons in the age range of 0 to 6 years. The total number of literate people in Kharia was 43,498 (79.09% of the population over 6 years).

== Infrastructure ==
According to the District Census Handbook 2011, Jalpaiguri, Kharia covered an area of 58.0255 km^{2}. Among the civic amenities, the protected water supply involved tap water from untreated sources, hand pump. It had 5,886 domestic electric connections. Among the medical facilities it had 13 dispensary/ health centres, 3 family welfare centres, 1 maternity and child welfare centre, 2 veterinary hospitals, 13 medicine shops. Among the educational facilities it had 27 primary schools, 6 middle schools, 9 secondary schools, 5 senior secondary schools, the nearest general degree college at Jalpaiguri 6 km away. It had 13 non-formal education centres (Sarva Shiksha Abhiyan).
