= Saktigarh, Siliguri =

Saktigarh
- Neighbourhood
- The location of Saktigarh in West Bengal
- Coordinates: 26.70°N 88.41°E
- Country: India
- State: West Bengal
- District: Jalpaiguri district
- Elevation: 122 m (400 ft)

Languages
  - Official: Bengali, English
- Time zone: UTC+5:30 (IST)
- PIN: 734 005
- Telephone code: 0353
- Vehicle registration: WB 74 / WB 73 ^{2}
- Website: www.siliguri.com
- ^{2} Vehicle Code based upon Siliguri Sub Divisional Court documentation

See Saktigarh for disambiguation

Saktigarh is a neighbourhood and former village in the south of the city of Siliguri, Jalpaiguri district, West Bengal. Saktigarh, located on the Mahananda River, was the site of the city's original centre.

== Education ==
The major Schools in Saktigarh include Saktigarh Vidyapith (H.S), Saktigarh Balika Bidyalaya and several primary schools. Phani Bhusan Madhyamik Vidyalaya is also close to Saktigarh.

== Transport ==
A new road, named the third Mahananda Bridge, has been rebuilt connecting Burdwan Road (Nowkagath More) and Medical More. The road is planned to join to the west with Matigara, providing seamless communication from the Station Feeder Road in the south and Deshbandhu Road in the east to the Hill Cart Road in the central part of the city. National Highway no. 31, 31A passes through Siliguri.

== Sport ==
Cricket, kho kho, taekwon-do, chess, and football are the five most popular sports in Saktigarh. Saktigarh Ground is the only cricket ground and matches are regularly held here. The city is home to many kho kho players and cricketers, including India international cricketer Wriddhiman Saha.
