= Garalbari =

Garalbari is a gram panchayat area located in the Jalpaiguri district of West-Bengal, India. Geographically, Garalbari is located in the latitude of 26.448391N and longitude of 88.6434308E. Garalbari is a panchayat village in Jalpaiguri Block of Jalpaiguri District of West Bengal State, India. It is located 13 km away towards the South from the district headquarters Jalpaiguri and 12 km away from Jalpaiguri city. The postal index number of Garalbari is 735132.

== Etymology ==
It was heard that the word 'Garal bari' (গড়াল বাড়ি) comes from the word ‘Garh’ trees. Garh tree belongs to the bush or Copsewood family. In the 1900s A.D.the undivided Jalpaiguri district has a big area. At that time the Panchagarh part(Rangpur district) of Bangladesh (then East Pakistan) lies within the Western Duars District. To facilitate the better collection of revenue of the Western Duars district, there was a landmark of widespread Garh trees. There was a lonely seclude resident behind the Garh bushes which was supposed to be the bottom part of this Sadar subdivision. This secluded home behind the Garh trees giving birth to the name of Garal bari ('Garer aral bari' to Garalbari).

== Geography ==
Garalbari is located in the southern part of the district has sharing international borders with Bangladesh in the south, Kharia gram panchayat in the north, Berubari gram panchayat in the east and Bahadur gram panchayat in the west respectively. The native language of Garalbari is Bengali, English, Hindi, and Urdu. Most of the villagers speak Bengali, and Hindi for communication. The total geographical area of the Panchayet village is 4521.02 hectares. The Net Area Sown of Garalbari is 2706 hectares under different types of land use, out of this 290 hectares are the total irrigated land area, 2415 hectares are the Un-irrigated land area, 145 hectares are the Canals irrigated area, 108 hectares are the Tubewell irrigated area and 35 are the Tank or lakes irrigated area. Garalbari is well known for potato cultivation, tea plantation and rubber plantation (Rubber Bagan).

== Climate ==
Garalbari is part of the monsoon climate zone of South-Eastern Asia. The temperature lies within the range of 10 °C to 36 °C and usually January is the coldest month, July is the wettest and December is the driest month of the year.

== Topography ==
The entire topography of Garalbari is equipped with three small rivers (namely Panga river, Jamuna river, and Dagaichand river) and a good number of big ponds (Harirbari dighi, kalayani dighi, suvachani dighi, hatpukuri dighi, jhaljhali dighi etc.).

== Demographics ==
According to the 2011 Census, Garalbari has a total population of 28,791 peoples. There are about 6,435 households in Garalbari Panchayat village. Female Population of Garalbari village is 49.0%. The village literacy rate is 61.7% and the Female Literacy rate is 27.6%.

== Education ==
There are 25 primary schools, 5 secondary schools, and 1 higher secondary school (Garal Bari High School) in Garalbari. There is no degree college, medical college and engineering college at Garalbari. There are 2 primary health sub-center and 12 Non-formal Training Centre (NFTC) in Garalbari.

== Transport & Communication ==
Garalbari is well connected to the district's main city, Jalpaiguri which is 11 km away from Garalbari. A good number of buses and auto are daily run on this Garalbari-Jalpaiguri route.

== Services ==
Garalbari has a large number of internet cafes, sports fields, Common Services Centre (CSC) and one Public library (Garalbari gram panchayat library). The whole region is well benefited by tap water provided by Public Health Engeeenier (PHE), Jalpaiguri division. There are also bank facilities of State Bank of India Customer Service Point (CSP) and Uttarbanga Kshetriya Gramin Bank (UBKGB). Sovarhat and Kamperhat are the two big local rural market which is satisfying to the day-to-day needs of the people of Garalbari.
