= Jalpaiguri Sadar subdivision =

- Subdivision
- Coordinates: 26.52°N 88.73°E
- Country: India
- State: West Bengal
- District: Jalpaiguri
- Headquarters: Jalpaiguri City
  - Rank: Urban

Population
  - Metro: 1,925,632
- Demonym(s): Jalpaigurians, Jalpaiguribashi

Languages
  - Official: Bengali, English
- Time zone: UTC+5:30 (IST)
- ISO 3166 code: ISO 3166-2:IN
- Website: wb.gov.in jalpaiguri.gov.in

Jalpaiguri Sadar subdivision is an administrative division of the Jalpaiguri district in the Indian state of West Bengal.

== Geography ==
=== Subdivisions ===
Jalpaiguri district is divided into the following administrative subdivisions:

Subdivision	Headquarters	Area km^{2}	Population (2011)	Rural population % (2011)	Urban population % (2011)
Jalpaiguri Sadar	Jalpaiguri	2,245.47	1,811,885	62.01	37.99
Malbazar	Malbazar	1,150.84	569,711	88.68	11.32
Dhupguri	Dhupguri	-	-	-	-
Total: Jalpaiguri district	Jalpaiguri	3,396.31	2,381,596	68.39	31.61

Places and tea estates in Jalpaiguri Sadar subdivision (including Rajganj, Jalpaiguri and Maynaguri CD blocks) in Jalpaiguri district
CT: census town, R: rural/ urban centre, N: neighbourhood, C: cantonment, NP: national park/ wildlife sanctuary, TE: tea estate
Abbreviations used in names – TG for Tea Garden (town/village), TE for Tea Estate, JRS: junction railway station
Owing to space constraints in the small map, the actual locations in a larger map may vary slightly

=== Administrative units ===
Jalpaiguri Sadar subdivision has 4 police stations, 3 community development blocks, 3 panchayat samitis, 42 gram panchayats, 144 mouzas, 133 inhabited villages, 2 municipalities, part of 1 municipal corporation and 5 census towns. The municipal corporation partly in the subdivision is Siliguri, with a population of 218,718 people. The municipalities are: Jalpaiguri and Mainaguri. The census towns are: Dabgram, Binnaguri, Chakiabhita, Kharia, and Dakshin Khagrabari. The subdivision has its headquarters at Jalpaiguri.

== Police stations ==
Police stations in the Jalpaiguri Sadar subdivision have the following features and jurisdiction:

Police Station	Area covered km^{2}	International border	Inter-state border km	Municipal Town	CD block
Rajganj	n/a	n/a	-	-	Rajganj (part)
Pradhan Nagar	n/a	-	-	Siliguri (part)	Rajganj (part)
Jalpaiguri	n/a	n/a	-	Jalpaiguri	Jalpaiguri
Mainaguri	n/a	-	-	Mainaguri	Maynaguri

- Dhupguri and Banarhat police station now under the Dhupguri subdivision.

=== Blocks ===
Community development blocks in the Jalpaiguri Sadar subdivision are:

CD block	Headquarters	Area km^{2}	Population (2011)	SC %	ST %	Literacy rate %	Census Towns
Rajganj	Rajganj	614.82	373,766	49.56	4.12	69.82	3
Jalpaiguri	Jalpaiguri	500.65	323,455	60.78	6.06	73.81	1
Maynaguri	Mainaguri	530.60	329,932	71.20	1.32	75.63	2

== Gram Panchayats ==
The subdivision contains 42 gram panchayats under 3 community development blocks:

- Jalpaiguri block consists of 14 gram panchayats, viz. Kharia, Arabinda, Paharpur, Mondalghat, Bahadur, Patkata, Belakoba, Barapatina Nutanabos, Garalbari, Nagar Berubari, South Berubari, Kharija–Barubari–I, Kharija–Barubari–II and Boalmari–Nandanpur.
- Maynaguri block consists of 15 gram panchayats, viz. Amguri, Domohoni–I, Domohoni–II, Madhabdanga–I, Madhabdanga–II, Padamoti–I, Padamoti–II, Barnesh, Ramshai, Churabhandar, Khagrabari–I, Khagrabari–II, Dharmapur, Saptibari–I and Saptibari–II.
- Rajganj block consists of 12 gram panchayats, viz. Dabgram I, Dabgram–II, Fulbari I, Fulbari–II, Binnaguri, Sannyasikata, Majhiali, Panikauri, Sukhani, Kukurjan, Sikarpur, Mantadari and Junglee Mohal Forest Area.

== Education ==
Given in the table below (data in numbers) is a comprehensive picture of the education scenario in Jalpaguri district, with data for the year 2013-14.

Subdivision	Primary School		Middle School		High School		Higher Secondary School		General College, Univ		Technical / Professional Instt		Non-formal Education	
Subdivision	Institution	Student	Institution	Student	Institution	Student	Institution	Student	Institution	Student	Institution	Student	Institution	Student
Jalpaiguri Sadar	911	115,080	38	6,912	51	51,110	116	161,827	8	19,460	34	13,075	2,752	189,077
Malbazar	291	40,856	28	4,930	13	14,522	27	37,144	1	3,810	1	252	1,643	78,471
Jalpaiguri district	1,202	156,936	66	11,842	64	65,632	143	198,971	9	13,270	35	13,327	4,395	267,448

Note: Primary schools include junior basic schools; middle schools, high schools and higher secondary schools include madrasahs; technical schools include junior technical schools, junior government polytechnics, industrial technical institutes, industrial training centres, nursing training institutes etc.; technical and professional colleges include engineering colleges, medical colleges, para-medical institutes, management colleges, teachers training and nursing training colleges, law colleges, art colleges, music colleges etc. Special and non-formal education centres include sishu siksha kendras, madhyamik siksha kendras, centres of Rabindra mukta vidyalaya, recognised Sanskrit tols, institutions for the blind and other handicapped persons, Anganwadi centres, reformatory schools etc.

=== Educational institutions ===
The following institutions are located in Jalpaiguri Sadar subdivision:

- Ananda Chandra College, was established at Jalpaiguri in 1942. Affiliated with the University of North Bengal, it offers honours courses in arts and science, a post-grauduate course in Bengali and an under-graduate course in physical education.
- Ananda Chandra College of Commerce, was established at Jalpaiguri in 1965. Affiliated with the University of North Bengal, it offers courses in commerce and some other subjects also.
- Banarhat Kartik Oraon Hindi Government College, was established at Banarhat in 2014. Affiliated with the University of North Bengal, it is a Hindi-medium institution offering courses in arts and science.
- Dhupguri Girls’ College, was established at Dhupguri in 2013. Affiliated with the University of North Bengal, it offers courses in arts.
- Jalpaiguri Government Engineering College, is an autonomous institution established in 1961.
- Jalpaiguri Law College, was established in 1981. It offers a five year integrated course.
- Kabi Sukanta Mahavidyalaya, was established at Dhupguri in 1981.Affiliated with the University of North Bengal, it offers courses in arts and commerce.
- Maynaguri College, was established in 1999. Affiliated with the University of North Bengal, it offers courses it offers courses in arts and science.
- North Bengal St. Xavier’s College, a Jesuit institution was established at Rajganj in 2007. Affiliated with the University of North Bengal it offers courses in arts, science and commerce.
- Prasannadeb Women’s College, was established at Jalpaiguri in 1950. Affiliated with the University of North Bengal, it offers courses in arts and science.
- Rajganj College, was established in 2009. Affiliated with the University of North Bengal, it offers courses in arts.
- Jalpaiguri Polytechnic Institute, was established in 1951. Affiliated with the WBSCTE, it offers diploma courses in Civil, Electronics and Communication Engineering, Mechanical and Electrical Engineering.
- Maynaguri Government Polytechnic, was established in 2015. Affiliated with the WBSCTE, it offers diploma courses in Civil, Instrumentation and Control Engineering and Survey Engineering.
- Rajganj Government Polytechnic, was established in 2016. Affiliated with the WBSCTE, it offers diploma courses in Civil, Electrical and Mechanical Engineering.
- Jalpaiguri Institute of Technology, was established in 2015. Affiliated with the WBSCTE, it offers diploma courses in Civil, Computer Science & Technology, Mechanical and Electrical Engineering.

== Healthcare ==
The table below (all data in numbers) presents an overview of the medical facilities available and patients treated in the hospitals, health centres and sub-centres in Jalpaiguri district, with data for the year 2014.:

Subdivision	Health & Family Welfare Deptt, WB				Other State Govt Deptts	Local bodies	Central Govt Deptts / PSUs	NGO / Private Nursing Homes	Total	Total Number of Beds	Total Number of Doctors*	Indoor Patients	Outdoor Patients
Subdivision	Hospitals	Rural Hospitals	Block Primary Health Centres	Primary Health Centres	Other State Govt Deptts	Local bodies	Central Govt Deptts / PSUs	NGO / Private Nursing Homes	Total	Total Number of Beds	Total Number of Doctors*	Indoor Patients	Outdoor Patients
Jalpaiguri Sadar	2	4	-	18	2	1	2	21	50	1965	269	136,901	1,435,220
Malbazar	1	1	2	7	-	-	-	19	30	541	50	33,971	448,216
Jalpaiguri district	3	5	2	25	2	1	2	40	30	2,506	319	170,872	1,883.436

.* Excluding nursing homes.

=== Medical facilities ===
Medical facilities in Jalpaiguri Sadar subdivision are as follows:

Hospitals: (Name, location, beds)

- Jalpaiguri District Hospital, Jalpaiguri M, 610 beds
- Rani Ashrumati Memorial T.B. Hospital, Jalpaiguri, 60 beds
- Jalpaiguri Jail Hospital, Jalpaiguri, 30 beds
- Jalpaiguri Police Hospital, Jalpaiguri, 28 beds
- New Jalpaiguri Railway Hospital, Bhaktinagar, Rajganj CD block, 100 beds
- Domohoni Railway Hospital, Domohoni, Maynaguri CD block, 2 beds

Rural Hospitals: (Name, CD block, location, beds)

- Maynaguri Rural Hospital, Maynaguri CD block, Mainaguri, 60 beds
- Dhupguri Rural Hospital, Dhupguri CD block, Dhupguri, 30 beds
- Rajganj Rural Hospital, Rajganj CD block, Payachari, 30 beds
- Belacoba Rural Hospital, Jalpaiguri CD block, Prasannanagr, 30 beds

Primary Health Centres : (CD block-wise)(CD block, PHC location, beds)

- Jalpaiguri CD block: Bahadur (4), Kharija Berubari (10), Nadanpur Bolamari (PO Bolamari) (4), Rangdhamali (10), South Berubari (PO Manikganj) (4).
- Maynaguri CD block: Barnes (10), Bhurangabari (PO Bakali) (10), Churabhandar (10), Singhimari (Domohoni) (6), Saptibari (10), Ramsi (PO Panbari) (6).
- Dhupguri CD block: Jhar Altargram (PO Dankanmari) (4), Sakarjhora (PO Sajnapara) (4), Duramari (Salbari) (6).
- Rajganj CD block: Kalinagar (10), Sikarpur (6), Kukrajn (Sukbari) (6).
