= Rajganj, Jalpaiguri =

Rajganj
- Neighbourhood
- Location in West Bengal, India Rajganj (India)
- Coordinates: 26.566111°N 88.528611°E
- Country: India
- State: West Bengal
- District: Jalpaiguri
- Time zone: UTC+5:30 (IST)
- PIN: 735134
- Telephone/STD code: 03561
- Vehicle registration: WB
- Lok Sabha constituency: Jalpaiguri
- Vidhan Sabha constituency: Rajganj
- Website: jalpaiguri.gov.in

Rajganj is a neighbourhood in the Rajganj CD block in the Jalpaiguri Sadar subdivision of the Jalpaiguri district in the state of West Bengal, India.

== Geography ==
Places and tea estates in Jalpaiguri Sadar subdivision (including Rajganj, Jalpaiguri, Maynaguri and Dhupguri CD blocks) in Jalpaiguri district
CT: census town, R: rural/ urban centre, N: neighbourhood, C: cantonment, NP: national park/ wildlife sanctuary, TE: tea estate
Abbreviations used in names – TG for Tea Garden (town/village), TE for Tea Estate, JRS: junction railway station
Owing to space constraints in the small map, the actual locations in a larger map may vary slightly

=== Location ===
Rajganj is located at 26.566111°N 88.528611°E.

According to the map of the Rajganj CD block on page 115 in the District Census Handbook, Jalpaiguri, 2011 census, Rajganj is shown as being a part of Sukani village.

=== Area overview ===
The map alongside shows the alluvial floodplains south of the outer foothills of the Himalayas. The area is mostly flat, except for low hills in the northern portions. It is a primarily rural area with 62.01% of the population living in rural areas and a moderate 37.99% living in the urban areas. Tea gardens in the Dooars and Terai regions produce 226 million kg or over a quarter of India's total tea crop. Some tea gardens were identified in the 2011 census as census towns or villages. Such places are marked in the map as CT (census town) or R (rural/ urban centre). Specific tea estate pages are marked TE.

Note: The map alongside presents some of the notable locations in the subdivision. All places marked in the map are linked in the larger full screen map.

== Civic administration ==
=== Police station ===
Rajganj police station has jurisdiction over a part of the Rajganj CD block.

=== CD block HQ ===
The headquarters of the Rajganj CD block are located at Rajganj.

== Education ==
Rajganj Mahendra Nath High School ( known as Rajganj M.N High School) was established in 1951.

Rajganj College was established in 2009. Affiliated with the University of North Bengal, it offers honours courses in Bengali, English, history, philosophy, education and a general course in arts.

North Bengal St. Xavier’s College, a Jesuit institution was established at Rajganj in 2007. Affiliated with the University of North Bengal it offers courses in arts, science and commerce.
