= Paharpur, Jalpaiguri =

Village in West Bengal, India

Paharpur
- Village
- Location in West Bengal, India Paharpur (India)
- Coordinates: 26.57°N 88.72°E
- Country: India
- State: West Bengal
- District: Jalpaiguri

Government
  - Type: Gram panchayat

Population (2011)
  - Total: 20,341

Languages
  - Official: Bengali, English
- Time zone: UTC+5:30 (IST)
- PIN: 735121
- Lok Sabha constituency: Jalpaiguri
- Vidhan Sabha constituency: Jalpaiguri

Paharpur is a village and a gram panchayat in the suburb of Jalpaiguri of the Jalpaiguri district in the state of West Bengal, India.
