= North Bengal St. Xavier's College =

College in West Bengal

Coordinates: 26°34′58.06″N 88°30′25.51″E

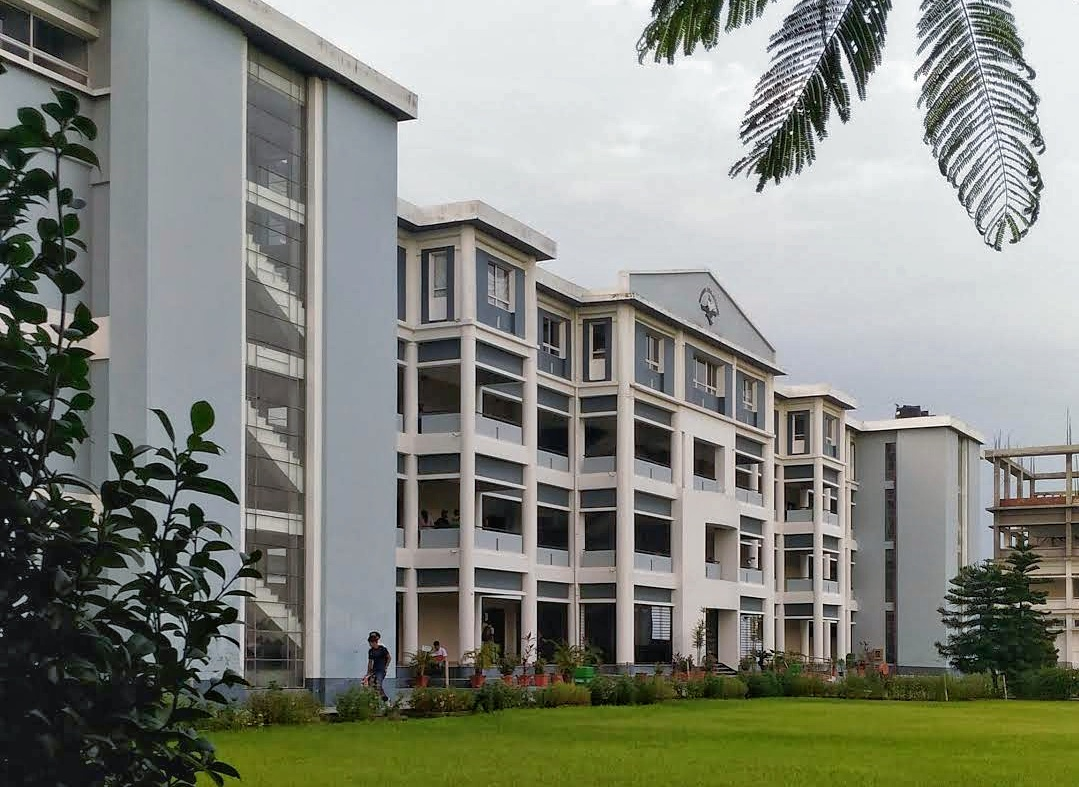
- Type: Undergraduate college Private college
- Established: 2007; 19 years ago
- Religious affiliation: Roman Catholic (Jesuit)
- Academic affiliations: University of North Bengal
- Principal: Fr. Dr. Lalit P. Tirkey, SJ
- Academic staff: 57
- Administrative staff: 22
- Location: Jalpaiguri, West Bengal, 735135, India
- Campus: Urban 32 acres
- Website: NBXC

- Location within West Bengal Location within India

North Bengal St. Xavier's College, Jalpaiguri, is the third Jesuit college established in the northern area of West Bengal, India. Founded in 2007, it offers undergraduate courses in arts and sciences and is affiliated to the University of North Bengal.

== History ==
Xavier's is preceded by two other Jesuit university colleges in the North Bengal area of the state of West Bengal, India: St Joseph's College, Darjeeling (1927) and Loyola College of Education, Namchi (1993). Xavier's has campuses at Rajganj and Siliguri, Matigara.

The university has two hostels which together accommodate 204 students. There are 77 on the teaching staff and 22 on the support staff. Xavier's Alumni Association of North Bengal was formed in 2013.

== Academics ==
=== Departments ===
Departments
Faculty	Departments
Science	Zoology, Botany, Microbiology, Physics, Chemistry, Mathematics, Computer Science
Humanities	English, History, Civics, Geography, Political Science, Sociology, Psychology, Education, Hindi, Bengali
Commerce	Economics, Accountancy, Management

=== Degrees ===
Undergraduate Programs
Degree	Specialization
B.A. Major	English, Sociology, Geography, History, Psychology, Political Science
B.Com. Major	Accounting, Management
	—
B.B.A. Major	Business Administration
B.C.A. Major	Computer Application
B.Sc. Major	Botany (Electives: Chemistry, Zoology) Zoology (Electives: Chemistry, Botany), Microbiology (Electives: Chemistry, Botany), Computer Science (Electives: Physics, Mathematics)
B.A. MDC	Electives: English, History, Sociology, Geography, Hindi, Education, Political Science
B.Sc. MDC	Includes: Zoology, Microbiology, Chemistry, Botany, Computer Science, Mathematics, Physics

There are also Career Oriented Programmes (Approved by University Grants Commission), Community College Programmes, and Indira Gandhi National Open University (IGNOU) affiliated courses.

== Activities ==
Major activities include: X-Travaganza (cultural festival), X-Uberance (two-day annual sports meet), X-Cellence day (to honor student achievements), farewell for seniors (a khata and cultural program), seminars (national & departmental for practical experience), departmental projects/field work (to explore student skills), and student’s leadership program (for select students). There is also a magazine produced by the students, Expressions.

== See also ==
- List of institutions of higher education in West Bengal
- Education in India
- Education in West Bengal
- List of Jesuit sites
