= Dabgram-Phulbari Assembly constituency =

Dabgram-Fulbari
- Constituency No. 19 for the West Bengal Legislative Assembly
- Interactive Map Outlining Dabgram-Fulbari Assembly Constituency

Constituency details
- Country: India
- Region: East India
- State: West Bengal
- Division: Jalpaiguri
- District: Jalpaiguri
- Lok Sabha constituency: Jalpaiguri (SC)
- Established: 2011
- Total electors: 264,767
- Reservation: None

Member of Legislative Assembly
- 18th West Bengal Legislative Assembly
- Incumbent Sikha Chatterjee
- Party: Bharatiya Janata Party
- Elected year: 2026
- Preceded by: Goutam Deb

Most Successful parties from Dabgram-Fulbari assembly
1. All India Trinamool Congress (2 times) (50.0%)
2. Bharatiya Janata Party (2 times) (50.0%)

Dabgram–Fulbari Assembly constituency is an assembly constituency in Jalpaiguri district in the Indian state of West Bengal.

== Overview ==
As per orders of the Delimitation Commission, No. 19 Dabgram-Phulbari Assembly constituency covers Ward Nos. 31 to 44 of Siliguri municipal corporation and Dabgram I, Dabgram II, Fulbari I and Fulbari II gram panchayats of Rajganj community development block,

Dabgram-Phulbari Assembly constituency is part of No. 3 Jalpaiguri (Lok Sabha constituency) (SC).

== Members of the Legislative Assembly ==
Election Year	Name of M.L.A.	Party Affiliation
2011	Goutam Deb	Trinamool Congress
2016	Goutam Deb	Trinamool Congress
2021	Sikha Chatterjee	Bharatiya Janata Party
2026	Sikha Chatterjee	Bharatiya Janata Party

For MLAs from the area before 2011 see Kranti Assembly constituency

== Election results ==
=== 2026 ===
In the 2026 West Bengal Legislative Assembly election, Sikha Chatterjee of BJP defeated her nearest rival Ranjan Sil Sharma of TMC by 97,715 votes.

2026 West Bengal Legislative Assembly election: Dabgram-Fulbari
Party	Candidate	Votes	%	±%
BJP	Sikha Chatterjee	166,300	66.02	▲16.17
AITC	Ranjan Sil Sharma	68,585	27.23	▼11.96
CPI(M)	Dilip Singh	7,695	3.05	▼3.9
INC	Rohit Sing (guddu)	2,311	0.92	New entry
IND	Dhanabala Roy	1,128	0.45	New entry
IND	Astami Roy	881	0.35	New entry
NBPP	Uttam Das	632	0.25	New entry
IND	Dipali Aditya	578	0.23	New entry
BSP	Biraj Sarkar	572	0.23	▼0.31
IND	Ramesh Barman	562	0.22	New entry
IND	Krishnadev Adhikary	546	0.22	New entry
SUCI(C)	Renuka Roy	331	0.13	▼0.08
IND	Alok Sen	328	0.13	New entry
AMB	Mousumi Aich	319	0.13	▼0.12
NOTA	Nota	1,121	0.45	▼0.85
Majority		97,715	38.79	▲28.13
Turnout		251,889	95.14	▲11.7
Registered electors		264,767		▼14.69
BJP hold		Swing	14.06	

=== 2021 ===
2021 West Bengal Legislative Assembly election: Dabgram-Phulbari
Party	Candidate	Votes	%	±%
BJP	Sikha Chatterjee	129,088	49.85	
AITC	Goutam Deb	101,495	39.19	
CPI(M)	Dilip Singh	17,998	6.95	
NOTA	None of the above	3,379	1.3	
Majority		27,593	10.66	
Turnout		258,969	83.44	
BJP gain from AITC		Swing		

=== 2016 ===
2016 West Bengal Legislative Assembly election: Dabgram-Phulbari constituency
Party	Candidate	Votes	%	±%
AITC	Goutam Deb	105,769	47.489%	−0.81%
CPI(M)	Dilip Singh	81,958	36.798%	−5.09%
BJP	Rathindra Bose	26,195	11.761%	+5.7%
Independent	Subhas Biswas	2,180		
BSP	Sanjiban Sarkar	1,409		
SUCI(C)	Abul Kashem	1017		
Amra Bangalee	Dulal Sarkar	914		
NOTA	None of the Above	3,283		
Turnout		222,725		
AITC hold		Swing		

=== 2011 ===
In the 2011 election, Goutam Deb of Trinamool Congress defeated his nearest rival Dilip Singh of CPI(M).

West Bengal assembly elections, 2011: Dabgram-Phulbari constituency
Party	Candidate	Votes	%	±%
AITC	Goutam Deb	84,649	48.29	
CPI(M)	Dilip Singh	73,413	41.88	
BJP	Dulal Kanti Das	10,623	6.06	
Independent	Subash Biswas	2,347	1.34	
BSP	Sanjiban Sarkar	1,423	0.81	
Independent	Nitu Jai Pritam	1,173		
Indian People's Forward Bloc	Shambhu Nath Roy	926		
AMB	Bapan Ghosh	742		
Majority		11,236	6.41	
Turnout		175,296	83.57	
AITC win (new seat)				
